= List of Ace single volumes =

Ace Books began publishing genre fiction in 1952. Initially these were mostly in the attractive tête-bêche format, but they also published a few single volumes, in the early years, and that number grew until the doubles stopped appearing in about 1978. The tête-bêche format was discarded in 1973, but future double novels were continued for a while,

Between 1952 and 1968, the books had a letter-series identifier; after that date they were given five-digit numeric serial numbers. The list given here covers every Ace book that was not a double, published between 1952 and 1978 (or later), for all genres. It gives a date of publication; in all cases this refers to the date of publication by Ace, and not the date of original publication of the novels. For more information about the history of these titles, see Ace Books, which includes a discussion of the serial numbering conventions used and an explanation of the letter-code system.

This list covers the non-double novels, for both the letter-series and numeric-series books. For the Ace Double volumes, see Ace Doubles.

Genres include SF (science fiction), MY (mysteries), WE westerns, and NF (nonfiction). Other mentioned genres are fantasy books, gothic novels, and romances - of which no one are specified. The ubiquitous na indicates "non applicable" or "I have no idea".

The genre of certain books can be deduced by the title or by reading about the author: TH for thriller, PI for pirates, HU for humor, WA for war, HO for horror, RO for romance, HF for historical fiction, and JD for juvenile delinquents.

== D, G and S Series ==
No.	Genre	Author/s	Title	Publ.
D-032	NF	Dorothy Malone	Cookbook for Beginners	1953
D-043	na	George S. Viereck and Paul Eldridge	Salome: My First 2000 Years of Love	1953
S-054	na	Carl Offord	The Naked Fear	1954
S-058	na	Joachim Joesten	Vice, Inc.	1954
S-060	WE	Samuel A. Peeples (as Brad Ward)	The Marshal of Medicine Bend	1954
D-062	HU	Ken Murray	Ken Murray's Giant Joke Book	1954
D-065	na	Juanita Osborne	Tornado	1954
D-065	na	Edward Kimbrough	Night Fire	1954
S-066	SF	L. Ron Hubbard	Return to Tomorrow	1954
S-067	na	Robert Bloch	The Will to Kill	1954
S-070	na	Rae Loomis	Luisita	1954
S-074	na	Virginia M. Harrison (as Wilene Shaw)	Heat Lightning	1954
S-075	HU	Ralph E. Shikes (ed.)	Cartoon Annual	1954
S-076	na	Émile Zola	Shame	1954
S-080	na	Wilene Shaw	The Fear and the Guilt	1954
S-082	WE	Louis L'Amour	Kilkenny	1954
S-083	MY	Arnold Drake	The Steel Noose	1954
S-085	na	Ernst-Maurice Tessier (as Maurice Dekobra)	The Bachelor's Widow	1954
S-087	na	Noland Miller	Why I Am So Beat	1955
D-088	NF	Dexter Davis	7-Day System for Gaining Self-Confidence	1955
S-090	SF	Robert Moore Williams	The Chaos Fighters	1955
S-091	na	Stanley Baron	End of the Line	1955
S-093	na	H. T. Elmo	Modern Casanova's Handbook	1955
S-095	MY	Harry Whittington	The Naked Jungle	1955
S-097	MY	Norman Hershman (as Norman Herries)	Death Has 2 Faces	1955
S-100	na	Henry Lewis Nixon	The Caves	1955
S-102	na	George Albert Glay	Oath of Seven	1955
S-104	na	R. V. Cassill and Eric Protter	Left Bank of Desire	1955
S-105	JD	Edward De Roo	The Fires of Youth	1955
S-107	na	C. P. Hewitt (as Peter Twist)	The Gilded Hideaway	1955
S-108	na	Leslie Waller (as C. S. Cody)	Lie Like a Lady	1955
D-110	SF	Isaac Asimov	The 1,000 Year Plan	1955
S-111	na	Harry Harrison Kroll	The Smoldering Fire	1955
S-114	na	Edward Adler	Living It Up	1955
S-116	na	Brant House	Words Fail Me	1955
S-117	na	Kim Darien Dark	Rapture	1955
S-119	na	Lawrence Easton	The Driven Flesh	1955
D-121	SF	Andre Norton	The Stars Are Ours!	1955
S-122	na	Ledru Baker Jr.	The Preying Streets	1955
S-124	na	Rae Loomis	House of Deceit	1955
D-125	SF	Isaac Asimov	The Man Who Upset the Universe	1955
S-126	na	A. H. Berzen	Washington Bachelor	1955
D-127	na	Robert Payne	Alexander and the Camp Follower	1955
S-130	na	Sidney Weissman	Backlash	1955
D-131	na	Eugene Wyble	The Ripening	1955
S-132	HU	Brant House (ed.)	Cartoon Annual#2	1955
S-133	SF	Donald A. Wollheim (ed.)	Adventures on Other Planets	1955
S-136	na	R. V. Cassill	A Taste of Sin	1955
S-137	na	Ralph Jackson	Violent Night	1955
S-140	HU	H. T. Elmo	Honeymoon Humor	1956
S-141	na	Oliver Crawford	Blood on the Branches	1956
S-142	na	Glenn M. Barns	Masquerade in Blue	1956
S-143	MY	Harry Whittington	A Woman on the Place	1956
S-145	na	Brant House (ed.)	Little Monsters	1956
D-146	SF	Will F. Jenkins (as Murray Leinster)	The Forgotten Planet	1956
S-148	WE	Samuel A. Peeples (as Brad Ward)	The Man from Andersonville	1956
S-151	na	Robert Novak	Climb a Broken Ladder	1956
S-152	HU	Henry Felsen	Medic Mirth	1956
S-153	na	Hallam Whitney	The Wild Seed	1956
D-154	na	Sloan Wilson	Voyage to Somewhere	1956
D-155	SF	Jules Verne	A Journey to the Center of the Earth	1956
S-158	na	Kim Darien	Golden Girl	1956
S-159	MY	Jack Webb (as John Farr)	She Shark	1956
S-161	HU	E. Davis	Gag Writer's Private Joke Book	1956
D-163	na	Russell Boltar	Woman's Doctor	1956
S-165	na	Brant House (ed.)	Love and Hisses	1956
D-169	SF	Jack Williamson and James E. Gunn	Star Bridge	1956
S-171	HU	Eddie Davis (ed.)	Campus Joke Book	1956
S-174	na	Robert Novak	B-Girl	1956
D-175	HU	Irving Settel (ed.)	Best Television Humor of the Year	1956
D-178	na	Jean Paradise	The Savage City	1956
S-179	na	Brant House (ed.)	Squelches	1956
D-181	MY	Arthur Conan Doyle and John Dickson Carr	The Exploits of Sherlock Holmes	1956
S-183	SF	Donald A. Wollheim (ed.)	The End of the World	1956
D-184	na	J. Mccague	The Big Ivy	1956
D-187	SF	A. E. van Vogt	The Pawns of Null-A	1956
S-188	na	Brant House (ed.)	They Goofed!	1956
S-190	na	Henry Lewis Nixon	The Golden Couch	1956
D-191	na	Frank Slaughter	Apalachee Gold	1956
D-194	na	Theodor Plievier	Moscow	1956
S-198	na	William Bender Jr.	Tokyo Intrigue	1956
D-200	NF	Edward J. Ruppelt	Unidentified Flying Objects	1956
D-202	na	Leonard Kauffman	The Color of Green	1957
D-206	WE	Robert Hardy Andrews	Great Day in the Morning	1957
D-207	na	Charles Grayson	Hollywood Doctor	1957
D-210	na	Stephen Longstreet	The Lion at Morning	1957
D-211	SF	Philip K. Dick	Eye in the Sky	1957
D-212	HU	H. T. Elmo	Hollywood Humor	1957
D-213	NF	Peter J. Steincrohn	How to Stop Killing Yourself	1957
D-214	na	Martin L. Weiss	Hate Alley	1957
D-218	na	Sasha Siemel	Tigrero!	1957
S-219	na	P. A. Hoover	Backwater Woman	1957
D-222	na	R. Frison-Roche	First on the Rope	1957
D-224	na	Shelby Steger	Desire in the Ozarks	1957
D-228	na	David Howarth	We Die Alone	1957
D-229	na	Walter Whitney	Take It Out in Trade	1957
D-232	na	Willard Manies	The Fixers	1957
D-233	SF	S. B. Hough (as Rex Gordon)	First on Mars	1957
D-234	WA	Robert L. Scott	Look of the Eagle	1957
D-238	na	Clellon Holmes	Go	1957
D-239	NF	G. Harry Stine	Earth Satellite and the Race for Space Superiority	1957
D-243	na	Michael Wells	The Roving Eye	1957
D-244	WA	Terence Robinson	Night Raider of the Atlantic: The Saga of the U-99	1957
D-245	SF	Jules Verne	Off on a Comet	1957
D-246	na	John Harriman	The Magnate	1957
D-250	na	Arthur Steuer	The Terrible Swift Sword	1957
D-251	na	Hamilton Cochran	Windward Passage	1957
D-254	na	Marcos Spinelli	The Lash of Desire	1957
S-256	na	Karl Ludwig Oritz	The General	1957
D-257	na	Louis Malley	Tiger in the Streets	1957
D-258	NF	Sławomir Rawicz	The Long Walk	1957
D-261	SF	Philip K. Dick	The Variable Man and Other Stories	1957
S-262	na	Leland Jamieson	Attack!	1957
S-263	na	Virginia M. Harrison (as Wilene Shaw)	See How They Run	1957
D-267	na	Jim Bosworth	Speed Demon	1958
D-268	HU	Brant House (ed.)	Lincoln's Wit, Humorous Tales and Anecdotes By and About Our 16th President	1958
D-269	na	Michael Powell	Death in the South Atlantic	1958
D-270	JD	Bud Clifton	D for Delinquent	1958
D-271	na	Cliff Howe	Lovers and Libertines	1958
D-274	SF	David McIlwain (as Charles Eric Maine)	World Without Men	1958
S-275	HU	Brant House (ed.)	Cartoon Annual#3- The Cream of the Year's Best Cartoons	1958
D-278	PI	Donald Barr Chidsey	This Bright Sword	1958
D-280	NF	James P. S. Devereux	The Story of Wake Island	1958
D-281	na	Norman Vincent Peale (ed.)	Guideposts	1958
D-282	na	Cliff Howe	Scoundrels, Fiends, and Human Monsters	1958
D-283	SF	Clifford D. Simak	City	1958
D-287	NF	Holland M. Smith	Coral and Brass	1958
D-290	na	P. A. Hoover	A Woman Called Trouble	1958
D-292	na	Booth Mooney	The Insiders	1958
D-293	WA	Väinö Linna	The Unknown Soldier	1954
D-296	na	John Clagett	Run the River Gauntlet	1958
D-300	na	J. Walter Small	The Dance Merchants	1958
D-302	na	Maurice Druon	The Iron King	1958
D-306	na	Peyson Antholz	All Shook Up	1958
D-307	na	Brant House (ed.)	From Eve On: Wit and Wisdom About Women	1958
D-309	SF	H. G. Wells	The Island of Dr. Moreau	1958
D-310	na	Marcos Spinelli	Mocambu	1958
D-312	JD	Harlan Ellison	The Deadly Streets	1958
D-314	na	Blair Ashton	Deeds of Darkness	1958
D-318	PI	Donald Barr Chidsey	Captain Crossbones	1958
D-319	na	Hans-Otto Meissner	The Man With Three Faces	1958
D-323	na	Brant House	The Violent Ones	1958
D-324	SF	Ray Cummings	Brigands of the Moon	1958
D-325	na	Irving Werstein	July 1863	1958
D-326	WA	Wilhelm Johnen	Battling the Bombers	1958
D-327	SF	Jeff Sutton	First on the Moon	1958
D-330	JD	Bud Clifton	Muscle Boy	1958
D-334	na	Stanley Johnston	Queen of the Flat-Tops	1958
D-336	na	Samuel A. Krasney	Morals Squad	1958
D-337	na	Jack Gerstine	Play It Cool	1958
D-338	JD	Edward De Roo	The Fires of Youth	1958
D-339	SF	Clifford D. Simak	Ring Around the Sun	1958
D-340	SF	Philip K. Dick	Solar Lottery	1959
D-341	na	Rae Loomis	The Marina Street Girls	1959
D-342	na	Nicholas Gorham	Queen's Blade	1959
D-343	JD	Edward De Roo	The Young Wolves	1959
D-344	na	Gordon Landsborough	Desert Fury	1959
D-350	SF	Peter George (as Peter Bryant)	Red Alert	1959
G-352	na	Francis Leary	Fire and Morning	1959
D-353	na	Donald A. Wollheim (ed.)	The Macabre Reader	1959
D-354	SF	Donald A. Wollheim (ed.)	The Hidden Planet: Science-Fiction Adventures on Venus	1959
D-355	na	Bill Strutton and Michael Pearson	The Beachhead Spies	1959
D-359	na	John Croydon (as John Cooper)	The Haunted Strangler	1959
D-363	na	Samuel A. Krasney	The Rapist	1959
D-364	na	Donald Barr Chidsey	The Pipes Are Calling	1959
D-365	na	Robert Eunson	MIG Alley	1959
D-366	SF	Alan E. Nourse and J. A. Meyer	The Invaders Are Coming	1959
D-370	na	Paul Ernst (as Ernest Jason Fredericks)	Cry Flood	1959
G-371	na	Theodor Plievier	Berlin	1959
D-374	na	Burgess Leonard	The Thoroughbred and the Tramp	1959
G-376	na	J. Harvey Howells	The Big Company Look	1959
D-377	SF	Jeff Sutton	Bombs in Orbit	1959
D-378	na	Virginia M. Harrison (as Wilene Shaw)	Out for Kicks	1959
G-382	na	C. T. Ritchie	Willing Maid	1959
D-383	na	David Stacton (as Bud Clifton)	The Murder Specialist	1959
G-386	na	Richard O'Connor	The Sulu Sword	1959
D-388	SF	H. G. Wells	When the Sleeper Wakes	1959
D-389	TH	Cyril Henry Coles and Adelaide Manning (jointly as Manning Cole)	No Entry	1959
G-390	na	R. Foreman	Long Pig	1959
D-394	PI	Donald Barr Chidsey	The Flaming Island	1959
D-395	WE	Allan Keller	Thunder at Harper's Ferry	1959
D-396	na	Rae Loomis	Luisita	1959
D-397	SF	Jules Verne	Journey to the Center of the Earth	1959
D-398	na	Noland Miller	Why Am I So Beat	1959
D-399	na	Edward Adler	Living It Up	1959
G-402	na	Daniel P. Mannix	Kiboko	1959
D-404	na	Clifford Anderson	The Hollow Hero	1959
D-405	SF	S. B. Hough (as Rex Gordon)	First to the Stars	1959
D-406	JD	Edward De Roo	Go, Man, Go!	1959
D-410	PI	Donald Barr Chidsey	Buccaneer's Blade	1959
D-411	MY	Bob McKnight	Swamp Sanctuary	1959
D-414	na	Alexandre Dumas	The Companions of Jehu	1960
D-416	na	John Kenneth	The Big Question	1960
D-417	JD	Edward De Roo	Rumble at the Housing Project	1960
D-420	na	John A. Williams	The Angry Ones	1960
D-422	SF	William A. P. White (as Anthony Boucher) and J. Francis McComas (eds.)	The Best from F & SF, 3rd Series	1960
D-423	na	Browning Norton	Tidal Wave	1960
D-426	na	Robert S. Close	Penal Colony	-
D-428	na	P. A. Hoover	Scowtown Woman	-
D-429	na	Charles Runyon	The Anatomy of Violence	1960
D-432	na	Donn Broward	Convention Queen	1960
D-434	SF	Jules Verne	The Purchase of the North Pole	1960
D-435	na	C. T. Ritchie	Lady in Bondage	1960
D-438	na	Charles Fogg	The Panic Button	1960
G-440	na	Andrew Hepburn	Letter of Marque	1960
D-441	na	Lloyd E. Olson	Skip Bomber	1960
D-444	na	Shepard Rifkin	Desire Island	1960
D-446	na	Edward Moore Flight	685 Is Overdue	1960
D-452	na	Joe L. Hensley	The Colour of Hate	1960
G-454	na	Anne Powers	Ride East! Ride West!	1960
D-455	SF	William A. P. White (as Anthony Boucher) (ed.)	The Best from Fantasy and Science Fiction, 4th Series	1960
D-458	na	Harry Wilcox (as Mark Derby)	Womanhunt	1960
D-460	na	James Macgregor	When the Ship Sank	1960
D-461	SF	Andre Norton	The Time Traders	1960
D-464	na	Virginia M. Harrison (as Wilene Shaw)	Tame the Wild Flesh	1960
D-466	WE	Richard O'Conner	Wild Bill Hickok	1960
D-467	na	William C. Anderson	Five, Four, Three, Two, One-Pfftt Or 12,000 Men and One Bikini	1960
D-468	SF	Eric Frank Russell	Sentinel of Space	1960
D-472	MY	Harry Whittington	A Night for Screaming	1960
D-473	SF	Eric Temple Bell (as John Taine)	The Greatest Adventure	1960
D-474	na	Leland Lovelace	Lost Mines & Hidden Treasure	1960
D-475	WE	Samuel A. Peeples (as Brad Ward)	The Marshal of Medicine Bend	1960
D-478	SF	Jeff Sutton	Spacehive	1960
G-480	WE	John Brick	The Strong Men	1960
D-481	na	Joseph F. Dinneen	The Biggest Holdup	1960
D-482	SF	A. E. van Vogt	The Weapon Shops of Isher	1961
D-486	JD	Edward De Roo	The Little Caesars	1961
D-487	na	Leonard Sanders	Four-Year Hitch	1961
D-488	na	Dan Brennan	Third Time Down	1961
D-490	SF	Donald A. Wollheim (ed.)	Adventures on Other Planets	1961
D-493	na	Ellery Queen (ed.)	The Queen's Awards, Fifth Series	1961
D-494	WE	Leslie T. White	Log Jam	1961
D-495	na	Samuel A. Krasney	A Mania for Blondes	1961
D-498	SF	Andre Norton	Galactic Derelict	1961
G-500	WE	George D. Hendricks	The Bad Man of the West	1961
D-501	na	David Stacton (as Bud Clifton)	Let Him Go Hang	1961
D-503	na	Frances Nichols Hanna (as Fan Nichols)	The Girl in the Death Seat	1961
D-504	SF	Jules Verne	Master of the World	1961
D-506	na	Harry Harrison Kroll	The Brazen Dream	1961
D-508	na	Donald A. Wollheim (ed.)	More Macabre	1961
D-512	PI	Donald Barr Chidsey	Marooned	1961
D-513	JD	Harlan Ellison	The Juvies	1961
D-516	SF	Otis Adelbert Kline	The Swordsman of Mars	1961
D-518	na	Bill Miller and Robert Wade (as Wade Miller)	Nightmare Cruise	1961
D-519	na	Carroll V. Glines and Wendell F. Moseley	Air Rescue!	1961
D-520	na	Virginia M. Harrison (as Wilene Shaw)	One Foot in Hell	1961
D-521	RO	Margaret Howe	The Girl in the White Cap	1961
D-522	JD	Hal Ellson	A Nest of Fear	1961
D-523	na	John Jakes (as Jay Scotland)	Strike the Black Flag	1961
D-524	RO	Maysie Greig (as Jennifer Ames)	Overseas Nurse	1961
D-525	SF	Will F. Jenkins (as Murray Leinster)	This World Is Taboo	1961
D-526	na	Kim Darien	Obsession	1961
D-527	SF	Andre Norton	Star Guard	1961
D-528	SF	Will F. Jenkins (as Murray Leinster)	The Forgotten Planet	1961
D-529	na	Leslie Turner White	The Pirate and the Lady	1961
D-530	SF	Robert Moore Williams	The Day They H-Bombed Los Angeles	1961
D-531	SF	Otis Adelbert Kline	The Outlaws of Mars	1961
D-532	RO	Isabel Capeto (as Isabel Cabot)	Nurse Craig	1961
D-533	na	H. T. Elmo	Mad. Ave.	1961
D-534	SF	Andre Norton	Daybreak - 2250 A. D.	1961
D-535	SF	Ray Cummings	The Shadow Girl	1961
D-536	RO	Peggy Gaddis	The Nurse and the Pirate	1961
D-537	SF	H. G. Wells	The Island of Dr. Moreau	1961
D-538	SF	Isaac Asimov	The 1,000 Year Plan	1961
D-539	RO	Mary Mann Fletcher	Psychiatric Nurse	1962
D-540	RO	Arlene Hale	School Nurse	1962
D-541	SF	Alan E. Nourse	Scavengers in Space	1962
D-542	SF	Andre Norton	The Last Planet	1962
D-543	RO	Harriet Kathryn Myers	Small Town Nurse	1962
D-544	SF	Frank Belknap Long	Space Station #1	1962
D-545	RO	Suzanne Roberts	Emergency Nurse	1962
D-546	SF	Andre Norton	The Crossroads of Time	1962
D-547	SF	John Brunner	The Super Barbarians	1962
D-548	na	Dudley Dean Mcgaughty (as Dean Owen)	End of the World	1962
D-549	RO	Tracy Adams	Spotlight on Nurse Thorne	1962
D-550	SF	Poul Anderson	No World of Their Own	1962
D-551	SF	Peter George (as Peter Bryant)	Red Alert	1962
D-552	RO	Patricia Libby	Hollywood Nurse	1962
D-553	HO	William Hope Hodgson	The House on the Borderland	1962
D-554	RO	Jean Francis Webb (as Ethel Hamill)	Runaway Nurse	1962
D-555	SF	Jack Williamson	The Trial of Terra	1962
D-556	RO	Ruth Macleod	A Nurse for Dr. Sterling	1962
D-557	RO	Florence Stuart	Hope Wears White	1962
D-558	RO	Suzanne Roberts	Campus Nurse	1962
D-559	RO	Jane L. Sears	Ski Resort Nurse	1962
D-560	RO	Robert H. Boyer	Medic in Love	1962
D-561	RO	Ann Rush	Nell Shannon R. N.	1963
D-562	RO	Patricia Libby	Cover Girl Nurse	1963
D-563	RO	Arlene Hale	Leave It to Nurse Kathy	1963
D-564	RO	Harriet Kathryn Myers	Prodigal Nurse	1963
D-565	RO	Ray Dorlen	The Heart of Dr. Hilary	1963
D-566	RO	Suzanne Roberts	Julie Jones, Cape Canaveral Nurse	1963
D-567	RO	Isabel Moore	A Challenge for Nurse Melanie	1963
D-568	SF	Poul Anderson	Star Ways	1963
D-569	RO	Arlene Hale	Dude Ranch Nurse	1963
D-570	WE	L. L. Foreman	Spanish Grant	1963
D-571	RO	Katherine Mccomb	Princess of White Starch	1963
D-572	WE	Brian Garfield (as Frank Wynne)	Arizona Rider	1963
D-573	WE	Louis Trimble (as Stuart Brock)	Whispering Canyon	1963
D-574	WE	Louis L'Amour	Kilkenny	1963
D-575	RO	Peggy Dern	A Nurse Called Hope	1963
D-576	RO	Dorothy Karns Dowdell	Border Nurse	1963
D-577	RO	Sarah Frances Moore	Legacy of Love	1963
D-578	WE	Brian Garfield	The Lawbringers	1963
D-579	RO	Suzanne Roberts	Hootenanny Nurse	1964
D-580	RO	Arlene Hale	Symptoms of Love	1964
D-581	RO	Suzanne Roberts	Co-Ed in White	1964
D-582	RO	Joan Sargent	My Love an Altar	1964
D-583	RO	Tracy Adams	Hotel Nurse	1964
D-584	RO	Monica Edwards	Airport Nurse	1964
D-585	RO	Arlene Hale	Nurse Marcie's Island	1964
D-586	RO	Barbara Grabendike	San Francisco Nurse	1964
D-587	RO	Arlene Hale	Nurse Connor Comes Home	1964
D-588	WE	Merle Constiner	Short Trigger Man	1964
D-589	RO	Virginia B. Mcdonnell	The Nurse With the Silver Skates	1964
D-590	WE	Lin Searles	Stampede at Hourglass	1964
D-591	RO	Monica Heath (as Arlene J. Fitzgerald)	Northwest Nurse	1964
D-592	WE	Nelson Nye	Gunslick Mountain	1964
D-593	RO	Suzanne Roberts	Sisters in White	1965
D-594	WE	Louis Trimble	The Desperate Deputy of Cougar Hill	1965
D-595	RO	Ruth Macleod	Nurse Ann in Surgery	1965
D-596	RO	Arlene Hale	Nurses on the Run	1965
D-597	WE	L. P. Holmes	The Hardest Man in the Sierras	1965
D-598	RO	Arlene Hale	Nurse on the Run	1965
D-599	RO	Patricia Libby	Winged Victory for Nurse Kerry	1965

== F Series ==
No.	Genre	Author/s	Title	Publ.
F-105	SF	William A. P. White (as Anthony Boucher) (ed.)	The Best from Fantasy and Science Fiction, Fifth Series	1961
F-109	SF	Andre Norton	Storm Over Warlock	1961
F-114	SF	Wallace West	The Bird of Time	1961
F-118	NF	Jacob O. Kamm	Making Profits in the Stock Market	1961
F-123	SF	Leigh Brackett	The Nemesis from Terra	1961
F-131	SF	William A. P. White (as Anthony Boucher) (ed.)	The Best from Fantasy and Science Fiction, Sixth Series	1961
F-132	na	Mario Cappelli	Scramble!	1962
F-135	SF	Leigh Brackett	The Long Tomorrow	1962
F-137	na	R. DeWitt Miller	Impossible: Yet It Happened!	1962
F-140	RO	Leonie St. John	Love With a Harvard Accent	1962
F-146	na	John Jakes (as Jay Scotland)	Sir Scoundrel	1962
F-151	na	Nedra Tyre	Reformatory Girls	1962
F-154	SF	A. E. van Vogt	The Wizard of Linn	1962
F-156	SF	Edgar Rice Burroughs	At the Earth's Core	1962
F-157	SF	Edgar Rice Burroughs	The Moon Maid	1962
F-158	SF	Edgar Rice Burroughs	Pellucidar	1962
F-159	SF	Edgar Rice Burroughs	The Moon Men	1962
F-162	SF	William A. P. White (as Anthony Boucher) (ed.)	The Best from Fantasy and Science Fiction, Seventh Series	1962
F-163	RO	Adele De Leeuw	Doctor Ellen	1962
F-167	SF	Andre Norton	Catseye	1962
F-168	SF	Edgar Rice Burroughs	Thuvia, Maid of Mars	1962
F-169	SF	Edgar Rice Burroughs	Tarzan and the Lost Empire	1962
F-170	SF	Edgar Rice Burroughs	The Chessmen of Mars	1962
F-171	SF	Edgar Rice Burroughs	Tanar of Pellucidar	1962
F-174	SF	S. B. Hough (as Rex Gordon)	First Through Time	1962
F-175	na	Evelyn Berckman	Lament for Four Brides	1962
F-178	SF	Donald A. Wollheim (ed.)	More Adventures on Other Planets	1963
F-179	SF	Edgar Rice Burroughs	Pirates of Venus	1963
F-180	SF	Edgar Rice Burroughs	Tarzan at the Earth's Core	1963
F-181	SF	Edgar Rice Burroughs	The Master Mind of Mars	1963
F-182	SF	Edgar Rice Burroughs	The Monster Men	1963
F-183	SF	Andre Norton	The Defiant Agents	1963
F-188	SF	Philip Francis Nowlan	Armageddon 2419 A.D.	1963
F-189	SF	Edgar Rice Burroughs	Tarzan the Invincible	1963
F-190	SF	Edgar Rice Burroughs	A Fighting Man of Mars	1963
F-191	SF	Jules Verne	Journey to the Center of the Earth	1963
F-192	SF	Andre Norton	Star Born	1963
F-193	SF	Edgar Rice Burroughs	The Son of Tarzan	1963
F-194	SF	Edgar Rice Burroughs	Tarzan Triumphant	1963
F-197	SF	Andre Norton	Witch World	1963
F-198	MY	Simenon	The Short Cases of Inspector Maigret	1963
F-201	SF	Robert James Adam (as Paul Mactyre)	Doomsday, 1999	1963
F-202	na	Evelyn Berckman	The Hovering Darkness	1963
F-203	SF	Edgar Rice Burroughs	The Beasts of Tarzan	1963
F-204	SF	Edgar Rice Burroughs	Tarzan and the Jewels of Opar	1963
F-205	SF	Edgar Rice Burroughs	Tarzan and the City of Gold	1963
F-206	SF	Edgar Rice Burroughs	Jungle Tales of Tarzan	1963
F-207	SF	Andre Norton	The Stars Are Ours!	1963
F-210	SF	Peter George (as Peter Bryant)	Red Alert	1963
F-211	SF	Otis Adelbert Kline	Planet of Peril	1963
F-212	SF	Edgar Rice Burroughs	Tarzan and the Lion Man	1963
F-213	SF	Edgar Rice Burroughs	The Land That Time Forgot	1963
F-216	SF	Isaac Asimov	The Man Who Upset the Universe	1963
F-217	SF	William A. P. White (as Anthony Boucher) (ed.)	The Best from Fantasy and Science Fiction, Eighth Series	1963
F-218	na	Allen Churchill	They Never Came Back	1963
F-219	na	Henry Makow	Ask Henry	1963
F-220	SF	Edgar Rice Burroughs	The People That Time Forgot	1963
F-221	SF	Edgar Rice Burroughs	Lost on Venus	1963
F-222	SF	Jeff Sutton	First on the Moon	1963
F-225	SF	H. Beam Piper	Space Viking	1963
F-226	SF	Andre Norton	Huon of the Horn	1963
F-231	SF	Andre Norton	Star Gate	1963
F-232	SF	Edgar Rice Burroughs	The Land of Hidden Men	1963
F-233	SF	Edgar Rice Burroughs	Out of Time's Abyss	1963
F-234	SF	Edgar Rice Burroughs	The Eternal Savage	1963
F-235	SF	Edgar Rice Burroughs	The Lost Continent	1963
F-236	SF	Andre Norton	The Time Traders	1963
F-239	SF	Clifford D. Simak	Time and Again	1963
F-240	SF	H. G. Wells	When the Sleeper Wakes	1963
F-241	SF	Jack Williamson and James E. Gunn	Star Bridge	1963
F-243	SF	Andre Norton	Lord of Thunder	1963
F-245	SF	Edgar Rice Burroughs	Back to the Stone Age	1963
F-246	SF	Thea von Harbou	Metropolis	1963
F-247	SF	Edgar Rice Burroughs	Carson of Venus	1963
F-248	SF	Ray Cummings	Beyond the Stars	1963
F-251	SF	Philip K. Dick	The Game-Players of Titan	1963
F-252	WE	J. C. Bayliss (as John Clifford)	The Shooting of Storey James	1964
F-255	SF	Philip E. High	The Prodigal Sun	1964
F-256	SF	Edgar Rice Burroughs	Land of Terror	1964
F-257	SF	Fletcher Pratt	Alien Planet	1964
F-258	SF	Edgar Rice Burroughs	The Cave Girl	1964
F-259	SF	Otis Adelbert Kline	Prince of Peril	1964
F-262	WE	Clifton Adams	Reckless Men	1964
F-263	SF	Andre Norton	Web of the Witch World	1964
F-266	WE	Allan Vaughan Elston	Roundup on the Yellowstone	1964
F-267	SF	Robert P. Mills (ed.)	The Best from Fantasy and Science Fiction, 9th Series	1964
F-268	SF	Edgar Rice Burroughs	Escape on Venus	1964
F-269	SF	J. H. Rosny	Quest of the Dawn Man	1964
F-270	SF	Edgar Rice Burroughs	The Mad King	1964
F-271	SF	Edmond Hamilton	Outside the Universe	1964
F-274	SF	H. Beam Piper	The Cosmic Computer	1964
F-277	SF	John Brunner	To Conquer Chaos	1964
F-278	na	Frances Spatz Leighton	Patty Goes to Washington	1964
F-279	SF	Andre Norton (as Andrew North)	Sargasso of Space	1964
F-280	SF	Edgar Rice Burroughs	Savage Pellucidar	1964
F-281	SF	Pierre Benoit	Atlantida	1964
F-282	SF	Edgar Rice Burroughs	Beyond the Farthest Star	1964
F-283	SF	Arthur Sarsfield Ward (as Sax Rohmer)	The Day the World Ended	1964
F-286	WE	Jim Bosworth	The Long Way North	1964
F-287	SF	Andre Norton	The Key Out of Time	1964
F-288	HU	Hal Sherman	Fishing for Laughs	1964
F-290	WE	D. B. Olsen	Night of the Bowstring	1964
F-291	SF	Andre Norton	Plague Ship	1964
F-293	SF	E. C. Tubb	Moonbase	1964
F-294	SF	Otis Adelbert Kline	The Port of Peril	1964
F-295	SF	A. E. van Vogt	The World of Null-A	1964
F-296	SF	Edwin L. Arnold	Gulliver of Mars	1964
F-297	SF	Henry Kuttner	The Valley of the Flame	1964
F-300	WE	Brian Garfield (as Brian Wynne Garfield)	Vultures in the Sun	1964
F-301	SF	Philip K. Dick	The Simulacra	1964
F-302	WE	Brian Garfield (as Frank Wynne)	Dragoon Pass	1964
F-303	SF	Marion Zimmer Bradley	The Bloody Sun	1964
F-304	SF	Roger Sherman Hoar (as Ralph Milne Farley)	The Radio Beasts	1964
F-305	SF	Robert E. Howard	Almuric	1964
F-306	SF	C. L. Moore and Henry Kuttner	Earth's Last Citadel	1964
F-307	SF	Gardner F. Fox	Warrior of Llarn	1964
F-308	SF	Andre Norton	Judgment on Janus	1964
F-309	SF	Philip K. Dick	Clans of the Alphane Moon	1964
F-310	SF	Andre Norton	Galactic Derelict	1964
F-311	SF	Donald A. Wollheim (ed.)	Swordsmen in the Sky	1964
F-312	SF	Roger Sherman Hoar (as Ralph Milne Farley)	The Radio Planet	1964
F-313	SF	Ray Cummings	A Brand New World	1964
F-314	SF	James H. Schmitz	The Universe Against Her	1964
F-315	SF	Andre Norton	The Beast Master	1964
F-316	WE	Robert McCaig	The Burntwood Men	1964
F-317	SF	James White	The Escape Orbit	1965
F-318	SF	Austin Hall	The Spot of Life	1965
F-319	SF	Edmond Hamilton	Crashing Suns	1965
F-320	SF	John Brunner (as Keith Woodcott)	The Martian Sphinx	1965
F-321	SF	Otis Adelbert Kline	Maza of the Moon	1965
F-322	SF	Samuel R. Delany	City of a Thousand Suns	1965
F-323	SF	Andre Norton	Daybreak - 2250 A.D.	1965
F-324	WE	Brian Garfield	Apache Canyon	1965
F-325	SF	Andre Norton	Ordeal in Otherwhere	1965
F-326	SF	Lin Carter	The Wizard of Lemuria	1965
F-327	SF	Henry Kuttner	The Dark World	1965
F-328	SF	Edward E. Smith	The Galaxy Primes	1965
F-329	SF	Andre Norton	Storm Over Warlock	1965
F-330	SF	Avram Davidson	What Strange Stars and Skies	1965
F-331	HO	Gahan Wilson	Graveside Manner	1965
F-332	SF	Andre Norton	Three Against the Witch World	1965
F-333	SF	L. Sprague de Camp	Rogue Queen	1965
F-334	SF	Rex Dean Levie	The Insect Warriors	1965
F-335	SF	Robert Moore Williams	The Second Atlantis	1965
F-336	WE	Ernest Haycox	Six-Gun Duo	1965
F-337	SF	Philip K. Dick	Dr. Bloodmoney, Or How We Got Along After the Bomb	1965
F-339	RO	Arlene Hale	Private Duty for Nurse Scott	1965
F-340	WE	John L. Shelley and David Shelley	The Relentless Rider	1965
F-341	RO	Suzanne Roberts	A Prize for Nurse Darci	1965
F-342	SF	H. Beam Piper	Lord Kalvan of Otherwhen	1965
F-343	SF	Ray Cummings	The Exile of Time	1965
F-344	SF	Henry Kuttner	The Well of the Worlds	1965
F-345	SF	Homer Eon Flint	The Lord of Death and the Queen of Life	1965
F-346	SF	John W. Campbell Jr.	The Black Star Passes	1965
F-347	SF	Ian Wright	The Last Hope of Earth	1965
F-348	WE	Nelson Nye	Guns of Horse Prairie	1965
F-349	RO	Suzanne Roberts	Celebrity Suite Nurse	1965
F-350	SF	Marion Zimmer Bradley	Star of Danger	1965
F-351	WE	Louis Trimble	The Holdout in the Diablos	1965
F-352	RO	Arlene Hale	Nurse on Leave	1965
F-353	SF	Avram Davidson	Rogue Dragon	1965
F-354	SF	Gardner F. Fox	The Hunter Out of Time	1965
F-355	SF	Homer Eon Flint	The Devolutionist and the Emancipatrix	1965
F-356	SF	Henry Kuttner	The Time Axis	1965
F-357	SF	Andre Norton	Year of the Unicorn	1965
F-358	WE	William Vance	The Wild Riders of Savage Valley	1965
F-359	RO	Sharon Heath	Jungle Nurse	1965
F-360	WE	L. L. Foreman	Rawhiders of the Brasada	1965
F-361	SF	John Brunner	The Day of the Star Cities	1965
F-362	RO	Suzanne Roberts	The Two Dr. Barlowes	1965
F-363	SF	Ray Cummings	Tama of the Light Country	1965
F-364	SF	John W. Campbell Jr.	The Mightiest Machine	1965
F-365	SF	Andre Norton	Night of Masks	1965
F-366	SF	Andre Norton	The Last Planet	1965
F-367	SF	Philip José Farmer	The Maker of Universes	1965
F-368	RO	Arlene Hale	Chicago Nurse	1965
F-369	WE	Samuel A. Peeples (as Samuel Anthony Peeples)	The Lobo Horseman	1965
F-370	WE	Samuel A. Peeples (as Brad Ward)	The Man from Andersonville	1965
F-371	RO	Arlene Hale	Camp Nurse	1965
F-372	SF	Edward E. Smith	Spacehounds of IPC	1966
F-373	SF	Jack Jardine and Julie Anne Jardine (jointly as Howard L. Cory)	The Sword of Lankor	1966
F-374	SF	Jeff Sutton	The Atom Conspiracy	1966
F-375	SF	Robert A. Heinlein	The Worlds of Robert A. Heinlein	1966
F-376	WE	Lewis B. Patten	The Odds Against Circle L	1966
F-377	SF	Philip K. Dick	The Crack in Space	1966
F-378	RO	Mary Mann Fletcher	Danger - Nurse at Work	1966
F-379	SF	Frank Herbert	The Green Brain	1966
F-380	WE	Lee Hoffman	The Legend of Blackjack Sam	1966
F-381	RO	Sharon Heath	Nurse at Shadow Manor	1966
F-382	SF	Brian W. Aldiss	Bow Down to Nul	1966
F-383	SF	Lin Carter	Thongor of Lemuria	1966
F-384	WE	L. P. Holmes	The Savage Hours	1966
F-385	RO	Arlene Hale	Emergency for Nurse Selena	1966
F-386	SF	Andre Norton	The Time Traders	1966
F-387	RO	Arlene Hale	Mountain Nurse	1966
F-388	SF	Samuel R. Delany	Babel-17	1966
F-389	WE	William Colt MacDonald	Shoot Him on Sight	1966
F-390	SF	James Holbrook Vance (as Jack Vance)	The Languages of Pao	1966
F-391	SF	Andre Norton	The Crossroads of Time	1966
F-392	SF	Emil Petaja	Saga of Lost Earths	1966
F-393	SF	Roger Zelazny	This Immortal	1966
F-394	RO	Gail Everett	Journey for a Nurse	1966
F-395	WE	Nelson Nye	Iron Hand	1966
F-396	SF	Kenneth Bulmer	Worlds for the Taking	1966
F-397	RO	Willo Davis Roberts	Nurse Kay's Conquest	1966
F-398	SF	Eric Frank Russell	Somewhere a Voice	1966
F-399	SF	Gardner F. Fox	Thief of Llarn	1966
F-400	SF	Otis Adelbert Kline	Jan of the Jungle	1966
F-401	WE	Merle Constiner	Outrage at Bearskin Forks	1966
F-402	SF	Paul Linebarger (as Cordwainer Smith)	Quest of the Three Worlds	1966
F-403	SF	Roger Zelazny	The Dream Master	1966
F-404	WE	Clifton Adams	The Grabhorn Bounty	1966
F-405	RO	Suzanne Roberts	Vietnam Nurse	1966
F-406	SF	Ray Cummings	Tama, Princess of Mercury	1966
F-407	SF	Thomas Burnett Swann	Day of the Minotaur	1966
F-408	SF	Andre Norton	The Sioux Spaceman	1966
F-409	WE	Lin Searles	Cliff Rider	1966
F-410	RO	Arlene Hale	Lake Resort Nurse	1966
F-411	WE	L. L. Foreman	The Mustang Trail	1966
F-412	SF	Philip José Farmer	The Gates of Creation	1966
F-413	RO	Sharon Heath	A Vacation for Nurse Dean	1966
F-414	SF	Emil Petaja	The Star Mill	1966
F-415	WE	Brian Garfield (as Frank Wynne)	The Bravos	1966
F-416	SF	S. B. Hough (as Rex Gordon)	Utopia Minus X	1966
F-417	RO	Willo Davis Roberts	Once a Nurse	1966
F-418	WE	Nelson Nye	Single Action	1967
F-419	RO	Suzanne Roberts	Rangeland Nurse	1967
F-420	SF	Neil R. Jones	Professor Jameson Space Adventure 1: The Planet of the Double Sun	1967
F-421	SF	Donald E. Westlake (as Curt Clark)	Anarchaos	1967
F-422	SF	Leigh Brackett	The Sword of Rhiannon	1967
F-423	WE	Lewis B. Patten	Giant on Horseback	1967
F-424	RO	Arlene Hale	Community Nurse	1967
F-425	SF	Poul Anderson	World Without Stars	1967
F-426	SF	Gordon R. Dickson	The Genetic General	1967
F-427	SF	Samuel R. Delany	The Einstein Intersection	1967
F-428	WE	William Colt MacDonald	Mascarada Pass	1967
F-429	SF	Philip K. Dick	The World Jones Made	1967
F-430	RO	Arlene Hale	Nurse on the Beach	1967

== M Series ==
No.	Genre	Author/s	Title	Publ.
M-116	SF	Robert P. Mills (ed.)	The Best from Fantasy and Science Fiction, Tenth Series	1965
M-119	SF	Jules Verne	Journey to the Center of the Earth	1965
M-132	SF	Robert W. Chambers	The King in Yellow	1965
M-137	SF	Robert P. Mills (ed.)	The Best from Fantasy and Science Fiction, Eleventh Series	1965
M-142	SF	H. F. Heard	Doppelgangers	1965
M-143	SF	John W. Campbell	Islands of Space	1965
M-144	WE	Ernest Haycox	Trigger Trio	1966
M-145	RO	Elizabeth Kellier	The Patient at Tonesburry Manor	1966
M-146	na	anonymous (ed.)	Cracked Again	1966
M-147	SF	Andre Norton	The Stars Are Ours!	1966
M-148	SF	Andre Norton	Star Born	1966
M-149	SF	John Holbrook Vance (as Jack Vance)	The Eyes of the Overworld	1966
M-150	SF	Andre Norton	The Defiant Agents	1966
M-151	SF	Andre Norton	The Last Planet	1966
M-152	SF	H. Warner Munn	King of the World's Edge	1966
M-153	SF	A. E. van Vogt	The Weapon Makers	1966
M-154	SF	John W. Campbell	Invaders from the Infinite	1966
M-155	SF	Roger Zelazny	Four for Tomorrow	1966
M-156	SF	Andre Norton	Key Out of Time	1966
M-157	SF	Andre Norton	Star Gate	1966
M-158	WE	Brian Garfield (as Brian Wynne)	The Proud Riders	1966
M-159	RO	Sylvia Lloyd	Down East Nurse	1966
M-160	WE	Nelson Nye	Trail of Lost Skulls (C. 1)	1966
M-161	RO	Sharon Heath	Nurse at Moorcroft Manor	1966
M-162	SF	Donald A. Wollheim (as David Grinnell)	Edge of Time	1966
M-163	na	Ray Hogan	Wolver	1966
M-164	RO	Suzanne Roberts	Cross Country Nurse	1966

== G Series ==
No.	Genre	Author/s	Title	Publ.
G-502	WE	Richard O'Connor	Pat Garrett	1965
G-504	na	Theodor Plievier	Moscow	1965
G-505	HU	Ken Murray	Ken Murray's Giant Joke Book	-
G-507	na	John M. Foster	Hell in the Heavens	-
G-510	MY	Charlotte Armstrong Lewi (as Charlotte Armstrong)	The Case of the Weird Sisters	1965
G-514	MY	Charlotte Armstrong Lewi (as Charlotte Armstrong)	Something Blue	-
G-515	NF	Sławomir Rawicz	The Long Walk	-
G-520	na	John Jakes (as Jay Scotland)	Arena	-
G-522	na	Frederick Faust (as George Challis)	The Firebrand	-
G-527	na	Frederick Faust (as George Challis)	The Bait and the Trap	1965
G-532	na	John Jakes (as Jay Scotland)	Traitors' Legion	1963
G-536	MY	Helen Reilly	The Day She Died	-
G-537	NF	Edward J. Ruppelt	Unidentified Flying Objects	1965
G-538	SF	Andre Norton	Shadow Hawk	1965
G-540	MY	Charlotte Armstrong Lewi (as Charlotte Armstrong)	A Little Less Than Kind	1965
G-541	MY	Jean Potts	The Evil Wish	-
G-542	TH	Heidi Huberta Freybe Loewengard (as Martha Albrand)	Meet Me Tonight	1965
G-544	na	Ruth Fenisong	The Wench Is Dead	1964
G-545	na	Dana Lyon	The Trusting Victim	1965
G-546	MY	Helen Reilly	Compartment K	1965
G-547	SF	Austin Hall and Homer Eon Flint	The Blind Spot	1965
G-548	MY	Rohan O'Grady	Let's Kill Uncle	1965
G-549	MY	Ursula Curtiss	The Iron Cobweb	1965
G-550	MY	Theodora Du Bois	The Listener	1965
G-551	SF	Donald A. Wollheim and Terry Carr (eds.)	World's Best Science Fiction: 1965	1965
G-552	MY	Theodora Du Bois	Shannon Terror	1965
G-553	TH	Michael Avallone	The Man from U.N.C.L.E.	-
G-554	MY	Genevieve Holden	The Velvet Target	-
G-555	MY	Ursula Curtiss	The Wasp	1963
G-556	RO	Leonie St. John	Love With a Harvard Accent	1963
G-557	MY	Ursula Curtiss	Out of the Dark	-
G-558	MY	Genevieve Holden	Something's Happened to Kate	-
G-559	TH	Heidi Huberta Freybe Loewengard (as Martha Albrand)	After Midnight	1965
G-560	MY	Harry Whittington	The Doomsday Affair	1965
G-561	MY	Ursula Curtiss	Widow's Web	1965
G-562	MY	Helen McCloy	The Long Body	1965
G-563	TH	Heidi Huberta Freybe Loewengard (as Martha Albrand)	A Day in Monte Carlo	1965
G-564	na	John Oram Thomas (as John Oram)	The Copenhagen Affair	1965
G-565	MY	Ursula Curtiss	The Deadly Climate	1965
G-566	RO	Irene Maude Swatridge and Charles John Swatridge (jointly as Theresa Charles)	Lady in the Mist	1965
G-567	RO	Theresa Charles	The Shrouded Tower	1965
G-568	MY	Melba Marlett	Escape While I Can	1965
G-569	NF	David Howarth	We Die Alone	1965
G-570	SF	Alan Garner	The Weirdstone of Brisingamen	1965
G-571	TH	David McDaniel	The Dagger Affair	1965
G-572	RO	Joy Packer	The Man in the Mews	1966
G-575	na	Margaret Summerton	Quin's Hide	1966
G-578	na	Dorothy Eden (as Mary Paradise)	Shadow of a Witch	1966
G-581	TH	John T. Phillifent	The Mad Scientist Affair	1966
G-582	SF	Jules Verne	Journey to the Center of the Earth	1966
G-583	na	Marie Garratt	Festival of Darkness	1966
G-586	SF	William L. Chester	Hawk of the Wilderness	1966
G-589	na	Margaret Summerton	Ring of Mischief	1966
G-590	TH	David McDaniel	The Vampire Affair	1966
G-593	na	Dorothy Eden (as Mary Paradise)	Face of an Angel	1966
G-594	na	Charles Runyon	The Bloody Jungle	1966
G-595	SF	Andre Norton	Quest Crosstime	1966
G-598	na	Barbara James Bright	Deadly Summer	1966
G-599	SF	Andre Norton	Star Guard	1966
G-600	na	Peter Leslie	The Radioactive Camel Affair	1966
G-603	na	Carolyn Wilson	The Scent of Lilacs	1966
G-604	na	Jess Shelton	Daktari	1966
G-605	SF	Jack Jardine (as Larry Maddock)	The Flying Saucer Gambit - Agent of T.E.R.R.A.#1	1966
G-608	MY	Jean Potts	The Only Good Secretary	1967
G-611	SF	Avram Davidson (ed.)	The Best from Fantasy and Science Fiction, Twelfth Series	1967
G-612	na	Leal Hayes	Harlequin House	1967
G-613	TH	David McDaniel	The Monster Wheel Affair	1967
G-616	na	Marion Zimmer Bradley	Souvenir of Monique	1967
G-617	na	Peter Leslie	The Diving Dames Affair	1967
G-620	SF	Jack Jardine (as Larry Maddock)	The Golden Goddess Gambit - Agent of T.E.R.R.A.#2	1967
G-621	RO	Elizabeth Kelly (as Elizabeth Kellier)	Matravers Hall	1967
G-624	na	Velma Tate (as Francine Davenport)	The Secret of the Bayou	1967
G-625	SF	Kenneth Bulmer	To Outrun Doomsday	1967
G-626	SF	Ursula K. Le Guin	City of Illusions	1967
G-627	SF	Fritz Leiber	The Big Time	1967
G-628	WE	Clifton Adams	Shorty	1967
G-629	RO	Elizabeth Kelly (as Elizabeth Kellier)	Nurse Missing	1967
G-630	SF	Andre Norton	Warlock of the Witch World	1967
G-631	SF	Neil R. Jones	The Sunless World: Professor Jameson Space Adventure#2	1967
G-634	SF	Poul Anderson	War of the Wing-Men	1967
G-635	na	Lena Brooke McNamara	Pilgrim's End	1967
G-636	na	Joan C. Holly (as J. Holly Hunter)	The Assassination Affair	1967
G-637	SF	Philip K. Dick and Ray Nelson	The Ganymede Takeover	1967
G-639	SF	Edmond Hamilton	The Weapon from Beyond: Starwolf Series#1	1967
G-640	SF	Thomas Burnett Swann	The Weirwoods	1967
G-641	SF	Jack Williamson	Bright New Universe	1967
G-643	na	Jean Vicary	Saverstall	1967
G-644	SF	Jack Jardine (as Larry Maddock)	The Emerald Elephant Gambit: Agent of T.E.R.R.A.#3	-
G-645	na	Gene DeWeese and Robert Coulson (jointly as Thomas Stratton)	The Invisibility Affair	1967
G-646	SF	Andre Norton	The X Factor	1967
G-647	SF	Will F. Jenkins (as Murray Leinster)	S.O.S. from Three Worlds	1967
G-649	SF	John Brunner	The World Swappers	1967
G-650	SF	Neil R. Jones	Space War: Professor Jameson Space Adventure#3	-
G-651	MY	Elizabeth Salter	Once Upon a Tombstone	1967
G-652	na	Michael Bonner	The Disturbing Death of Jenkin Delaney	1967
G-653	RO	Arlene Hale	Doctor's Daughter	1967
G-654	SF	Andre Norton	Catseye	1967
G-655	SF	Andre Norton	Witch World	1967
G-656	SF	John Jakes	When the Star Kings Die	1967
G-657	WE	Nelson Nye	Rider on the Roan	1967
G-658	na	Rona Shambrook (as Rona Randall)	Leap in the Dark	1967
G-660	SF	A. E. van Vogt	The Universe Maker	1967
G-661	SF	James Holbrook Vance (as Jack Vance)	Big Planet	1967
G-662	na	Agnes Mary Robertson Dunlop (as Elisabeth Kyle)	The Second Mally Lee	1967
G-663	na	Gene DeWeese and Robert Coulson (jointly as Thomas Stratton)	The Mind-Twisters Affair	1967
G-664	SF	John Brunner	Born Under Mars	1967
G-665	WE	L. L. Foreman	Silver Flame	-
G-666	RO	Elizabeth Kelly (as Elizabeth Kellier)	Wayneston Hospital	1967
G-667	SF	David McDaniel	The Arsenal Out of Time	1967
G-669	SF	Leigh Brackett	The Coming of the Terrans	1967
G-670	na	David McDaniel	The Rainbow Affair	1967
G-671	SF	John Brunner	Catch a Falling Star	1967
G-672	RO	Arlene Hale	University Nurse	1967
G-673	SF	Mark S. Geston	Lords of the Starship	-
G-675	SF	James White	The Secret Visitors	1967
G-676	RO	John Sawyer and Nancy Buckingham Sawyer (as Nancy Buckingham)	Storm in the Mountains	1967
G-677	SF	Damon Knight	Turning On: Thirteen Stories	1967
G-678	WE	L. L. Foreman	The Plundering Gun	-
G-679	RO	Willo Davis Roberts	Nurse at Mystery Villa	1967
G-680	SF	Kenneth Bulmer	Cycle of Nemesis	1967
G-681	SF	Neil R. Jones	Twin Worlds: Professor Jameson Space Adventure#4	1967
G-683	SF	Leigh Brackett	The Big Jump	1967
G-684	na	Barbara James	Beauty That Must Die	1968
G-685	WE	Herbert Purdum	My Brother John	-
G-686	RO	Ray Dorien	The Odds Against Nurse Pat	1968
G-688	SF	John Holbrook Vance (as Jack Vance)	City of the Chasch: Planet of Adventure#1	1968
G-689	na	Ron Ellik and Fredric Langley (jointly as Fredric Davies)	The Cross of Gold Affair	1968
G-690	SF	Andre Norton	The Beast Master	1968
G-691	SF	Andre Norton	Lord of Thunder	-
G-692	SF	Otis Adelbert Kline	The Swordsman of Mars	1968
G-693	SF	Otis Adelbert Kline	The Outlaws of Mars	1968
G-694	SF	Thomas Burnett Swann	The Dolphin and the Deep	1968
G-695	WE	Theodore V. Olsen	Bitter Grass	-
G-696	RO	Arlene Hale	Emergency Call	1968
G-697	SF	Poul Anderson	We Claim These Stars	1968
G-699	MY	Cornell Woolrich	The Bride Wore Black	1968
G-700	MY	Elizabeth Salter	Will to Survive	1968
G-701	SF	Edmond Hamilton	The Closed Worlds: Starwolf#2	1968
G-702	na	William Johnston	Miracle at San Tanco: The Flying Nun	1968
G-703	SF	Andre Norton	Victory on Janus	1968
G-704	WE	Carse Boyd	Navarro	1962
G-706	SF	Samuel R. Delany	The Jewels of Aptor	1968
G-707	HO	T. E. Huff (as Edwina Marlowe)	The Master of Phoenix Hall	1968
G-708	WE	Clifton Adams	A Partnership With Death	1968
G-709	SF	John Brunner	Bedlam Planet	1968
G-711	RO	Rona Shambrook (as Rona Randall)	Nurse Stacey Comes Aboard	1968
G-712	SF	William A. P. White (as Anthony Boucher) and J. Francis McComas (eds.)	The Best from Fantasy and Science Fiction, Third Series	-
G-713	SF	William A. P. White (as Anthony Boucher) (ed.)	The Best from F & Sf Fourth Series	1968
G-714	SF	William A. P. White (as Anthony Boucher) (ed.)	The Best from F & Sf Fifth Series	1968
G-715	SF	William A. P. White (as Anthony Boucher) (ed.)	The Best from Fantasy and Science Fiction, Sixth Series	1968
G-716	SF	Andre Norton	Web of the Witch World	-
G-717	SF	Andre Norton	Daybreak - 2250 A.D.	1968
G-718	SF	Philip K. Dick	Solar Lottery	1968
G-719	SF	Neil R. Jones	Doomday on Ajiat: Professor Jameson Space Adventure#5	1968
G-720	WE	Brian Garfield (as Brian Wynne)	Brand of the Gun	1968
G-722	RO	Gail Everett	My Favorite Nurse	1968
G-723	SF	Andre Norton	Star Hunter & Voodoo Planet	1968
G-724	SF	Philip José Farmer	A Private Cosmos	1968
G-725	na	William Johnston	The Littlest Rebels: The Flying Nun#2	1968
G-726	WE	Lee Hoffman	The Valdez Horses	1968
G-728	SF	Donald A. Wollheim (as David Grinnell)	Across Time	1968
G-729	TH	David McDaniel	The Utopia Affair	1968
G-730	SF	Alan E. Nourse	Psi High and Others	1968
G-731	WE	Nelson Nye	A Lost Mine Named Shelton	1968
G-733	SF	Edgar Rice Burroughs	At the Earth's Core	1968
G-734	SF	Edgar Rice Burroughs	Pellucidar	1968
G-735	SF	Edgar Rice Burroughs	Tanar of Pellucidar	1968
G-736	SF	Edgar Rice Burroughs	Tarzan at the Earth's Core	1968
G-737	SF	Edgar Rice Burroughs	Back to the Stone Age	1968
G-738	SF	Edgar Rice Burroughs	Land of Terror	1968
G-739	SF	Edgar Rice Burroughs	Savage Pellucidar	1968
G-740	SF	Fred Saberhagen	The Broken Lands	1968
G-741	WE	Wayne D. Overholser and Lewis B. Patten (jointly as Dean Owen)	Red Is the Valley	1968
G-743	RO	Sharon Heath	Nurse on Castle Island	1968
G-744	na	Eula Atwood Morrison (as Andrea Delmonico)	Chateau Chaumand	1968
G-745	SF	Edgar Rice Burroughs	The Moon Maid	1968
G-746	WE	William Colt MacDonald	Marked Deck at Topango Wells	1968
G-748	SF	Edgar Rice Burroughs	The Moon Men	1968
G-749	RO	John Sawyer and Nancy Buckingham Sawyer (as Nancy Buckingham)	Call of Glengarron	1968
G-750	RO	Arlene Hale	Dr. Barry's Nurse	1968
G-751	na	Mildred Davies	The Dark Place	1968
G-752	na	Peter Leslie	The Splintered Sunglasses Affair	1968
G-753	SF	Alan Garner	The Moon of Gomrath	1968
G-754	WE	Jack L. Bickham	The War on Charity Ross	1968
G-756	SF	Alexei Panshin	Star Well	1968
G-757	na	Helen Arvonen	Remember With Tears	1968
G-758	SF	Thomas Burnett Swann	Moondust	1968
G-759	WE	Giff Cheshire	Wenatchee Bend	1968
G-761	SF	John Brunner	Catch a Falling Star	1968
G-762	SF	Alexei Panshin	The Thurb Revolution	1968
G-763	WE	John Shelley and David Shelley	Hell-For-Leather Jones	1968
G-765	RO	Virginia Smiley	Nurse Kate's Mercy Flight	1968
G-766	SF	Edmond Hamilton	World of the Starwolves: Starwolf#3	1968

== H Series ==
No.	Genre	Author/s	Title	Publ.
H-1	NF	Theodore R. Kupferman	The Family Legal Advisor	-
H-3	na	Louis Paul	Dara the Cypriot	-
H-4	na	Olive Erkerson	My Lord Essex	-
H-5	na	John H. Culp	Born of the Sun	-
H-6	na	Florence A. Seward	Gold for the Caesars	-
H-7	na	John H. Culp	The Restless Land	-
H-8	na	Will Creed	The Sword of Il Grande	-
H-9	MY	Theodora Du Bois	Captive of Rome	1966
H-10	na	Theodor Plievier	Berlin	1966
H-11	na	Theodor Plievier	Moscow	1966
H-12	NF	Harold T. Wilkins	Strange Mysteries of Time and Space	1966
H-13	NF	Gardner Soule	The Mystery Monsters	1966
H-14	NF	Vincent Gaddis	Invisible Horizons	1966
H-15	SF	Donald A. Wollheim and Terry Carr (eds.)	The World's Best Science Fiction: 1966	-
H-16	NF	Hans Holzer	Ghosts I've Met	1965
H-17	NF	Jacques Vallée	Anatomy of a Phenomenon	1966
H-18	SF	Jeff Sutton	H-Bomb Over America	1966
H-19	SF	Frederik Pohl (ed.)	The If Reader of Science Fiction	1966
H-23	RO	Georgette Heyer	Arabella	-
H-24	NF	Charles Fort	The Book of the Damned	-
H-25	RO	Jan Tempest	House of the Pines	-
H-26	SF	Avram Davidson (ed.)	The Best from Fantasy and Science Fiction, 13th Series	1967
H-28	NF	Jacques Vallée	Flying Saucers	-
H-30	SF	Clifford D. Simak	City	1967
H-31	na	Dorothy Eden	Sleep in the Woods	-
H-32	JD	Hal Ellson	Games	-
H-33	SF	Andre Norton	Moon of Three Rings	1967
H-35	na	Dorothy Eden	The Daughters of Ardmore Hall	1967
H-37	na	Charlotte Hunt	The Gilded Sarcophagus	1967
H-38	SF	Fritz Leiber	The Swords of Lankhmar	1968
H-39	SF	Philip K. Dick	Eye in the Sky	1968
H-41	SF	Jules Verne	Into the Niger Bend	1968
H-42	SF	Clifford D. Simak	Why Call Them Back from Heaven?	1968
H-43	SF	Jules Verne	The City in the Sahara	1968
H-44	RO	Georgette Heyer	The Quiet Gentleman	-
H-46	WA	Robert L. Scott	Look of the Eagle	-
H-47	NF	Hans Holzer	Lively Ghosts of Ireland	-
H-49	SF	Jules Verne	The Begum's Fortune	1968
H-50	MY	Janet Caird	In a Glass, Darkly	1968
H-52	SF	Jules Verne	Yesterday and Tomorrow	1968
H-53	HO	Leslie H. Whitten	Progeny of the Adder	1968
H-54	SF	R. A. Lafferty	Past Master	1968
H-55	NF	Willy Ley	For Your Information: On Earth and in the Sky	1968
H-57	MY	Cornell Woolrich	Rendezvous in Black	1967
H-58	SF	Gertrude Friedberg	The Revolving Boy	1968
H-60	SF	Jules Verne	Carpathian Castle	1968
H-61	MY	Elizabeth Salter	Death in a Mist	1968
H-62	SF	Wilson Tucker	The Lincoln Hunters	1968
H-63	na	Miriam Allen Deford	The Real Bonnie & Clyde	1968
H-64	NF	Brinsley Trench	Flying Saucer Story	-
H-66	MY	Cornell Woolrich	The Black Path of Fear	1968
H-67	SF	Jules Verne	The Village in the Treetops	1968
H-68	na	Raymond Bayless	The Enigma of the Poltergeist	1968
H-69	na	Rona Shambrook (as Rona Randall)	Knight's Keep	1968
H-71	RO	Lois Dorothea Low (as Dorothy Mackie Low)	Isle for a Stranger	1968
H-72	SF	Joanna Russ	Picnic on Paradise	1968
H-73	SF	Fritz Leiber	Swords Against Wizardy	1968
H-74	NF	Charles Fort	New Lands	1968
H-76	RO	Georgette Heyer	April Lady	-
H-78	SF	Jules Verne	The Hunt for the Meteor	1968
H-79	SF	Bob Shaw	The Two-Timers	1968
H-80	MY	Margaret Summerton (as Jan Roffman)	With Murder in Mind	1968
H-81	na	John Macklin	Passport to the Unknown	1968
H-83	na	Bernhardt J. Hurwood	Vampires, Werewolves, and Ghouls	1968
H-84	SF	Andre Norton	Sorceress of the Witch World	1968
H-86	SF	D. G. Compton	Synthajoy	1968
H-87	NF	Rebecca Liswood	A Marriage Doctor Speaks Her Mind About Sex	-
H-88	NF	Charles Fort	Wild Talents	-
H-89	SF	John Macklin	Dimensions Beyond the Unknown	-
H-90	SF	Fritz Leiber	Swords in the Mist	1968
H-92	SF	A. E. van Vogt	The Far-Out Worlds of A. E. van Vogt	1968
H-93	MY	Delano Ames	The Man in the Tricorn Hat	-
H-94	na	John Macklin	Dwellers in Darkness	1968
H-96	HO	Shirley Jackson	The Sundial	-
H-97	MY	Delano Ames	The Man With Three Jaguars	-
H-98	na	Charlotte Hunt	The Cup of Thanatos	1958
H-99	NF	Nostradamus; Robb Stewart (trans.)	Prophecies on World Events	-
H-100	NF	Hans Holzer	ESP and You	-
H-101	RO	Georgette Heyer	Sprig Muslin	-
H-102	SF	Edward E. Smith	Subspace Explorers	1968
H-104	MY	Cornell Woolrich	The Black Curtain	1968
H-105	SF	James H. Schmitz	The Demon Breed	1968
H-106	MY	Janet Caird	Perturbing Spirit	-
H-107	HO	Virginia Coffman	The Dark Gondola	-
H-108	na	John Macklin	Challenge to Reality	-

== K Series ==
No.	Genre	Author/s	Title	Publ.
K-101	na	Charles Francis Potter	The Faith Men Live By	-
K-102	NF	Richard E. Byrd	Alone	-
K-103	na	Prudencio de Pereda	Fiesta	-
K-104	NF	W. A. Swanberg	Sickles the Incredible	-
K-105	HF	Alfred Duggan	Winter Quarters	-
K-106	na	Allen Churchill	The Improper Bohemians	-
K-107	WE	Hugh B. Cave	The Cross on the Drum	1959
K-108	na	D. Robertson	Three Days	-
K-109	na	Dalton Trumbo	Jonny Got His Gun	1959
K-110	na	Kirst	The Seventh Day	1959
K-111	HU	Robert Sproul	The Cracked Reader	-
K-112	na	Les Savage, Jr.	The Royal City	-
K-113	na	Eric Duthie	Tall Short Stories	-
K-114	HF	O. A. Bushnell	Peril in Paradise	-
K-115	na	A. A. Hoehling	They Sailed Into Oblivion	-
K-116	na	Elliot West	Man Running	-
K-117	NF	Frank Edward	Stranger Than Science	1960
K-118	HF	Alfred Duggan	Children of the Wolf	1959
K-119	na	Ralph Ginzburg	Erotica	-
K-120	NF	J. Haslip	Lucrezia Borgia	-
K-121	HU	Robert C. Ruark	Grenadine Etching - Her Life and Loves	-
K-122	NF	Kurt Singer (ed.)	Spies Who Changed History	-
K-123	na	Richard B. Erno	The Hunt	-
K-124	NF	Peter Freuchen	Eskimo	-
K-125	na	Harold Mehling	Scandalous Scamps	-
K-126	na	Robert Dahl	Breakdown	-
K-127	HF	George Stewart	Fire	-
K-128	NF	Clellan S. Ford and Frank A. Beach	Patterns of Sexual Behavior	-
K-129	HF	Alfred Duggan	Conscience of the King	-
K-132	HF	Harnett Thomas Kane	Spies for the Blue and Gray	-
K-133	HF	Don Berry	Trask: The Coast of Oregon, 1848	-
K-134	NF	Peter Fleming	Operation Sea Lion	-
K-136	na	C. D. MacDougall	Hoaxes	-
K-137	na	George Bluestone	The Private World of Cully Powers	-
K-138	HF	George R. Stewart	Ordeal By Hunger	-
K-139	HF	Alfred Duggan	Three's Company	-
K-140	NF	Harry R. Litchfield	Your Child's Care	-
K-141	NF	Emil Ludwig	Michelangelo and Rembrandt: Selections from Three Titans	-
K-142	na	Brant House (ed.)	Crimes That Shocked America	-
K-143	na	Willa Gibbs	The Twelfth Physician	-
K-144	NF	Frank Edwards	Strangest of All	1962
K-145	na	Harry F. Tashman	The Marriage Bed	-
K-146	na	Rowena Farr	Seal Morning	-
K-147	na	Carl J. Spinatelli	Baton Sinister	1959
K-148	NF	Herbert Asbury	The Chicago Underworld	-
K-149	NF	Talbot Mundy	Queen Cleopatra	1962
K-150	RO	Patricia Robins	Lady Chatterley's Daughter	1961
K-151	na	Pierce G. Fredericks	The Great Adventure	-
K-152	NF	Brant House (ed.)	Great Trials of Famous Lawyers	1962
K-153	NF	Rebecca Liswood	A Marriage Doctor Speaks Her Mind About Sex	-
K-154	SF	George R. Stewart	Earth Abides	1962
K-155	NF	Thomas R. Henry	The Strangest Things in the World	-
K-156	NF	Charles Fort	The Book of the Damned	-
K-157	NF	E. H. G. Lutz	Miracles of Modern Surgery	-
K-158	MY	Phyllis A. Whitney	Thunder Heights	-
K-159	MY	Theodora Du Bois	Captive of Rome	-
K-160	HO	Guy Endore	The Werewolf of Paris	-
K-161	NF	Frederick L. Collins	The FBI in Peace and War	-
K-162	na	Richard O'Connor	Gould's Millions	-
K-163	NF	Rupert Furneaux	Worlds Strangest Mysteries	-
K-164	MY	Phyllis A. Whitney	The Trembling Hills	-
K-166	HO	Shirley Jackson	The Sundial	-
K-167	na	Karen Blixen (as Pierre Andrezel)	The Angelic Avengers	-
K-168	NF	R. DeWitt Miller	Stranger Than Life	-
K-169	na	Scott Sullivan	The Shortest Gladdest Years	-
K-170	na	John J. Pugh	High Carnival	-
K-171	na	Dorothy Eden	Lady of Mallow	-
K-172	na	Peter Bourne	The Golden Pagans	-
K-173	na	Dorothea Malm	To the Castle	-
K-174	RO	Georgette Heyer	The Grand Sophy	-
K-175	HO	Virginia Coffman	Moura	1963
K-176	na	Brant House	Strange Powers of Unusual People	-
K-177	HF	Anya Seton	My Theodosia	-
K-178	MY	Phyllis A. Whitney	The Quicksilver Pool	-
K-179	RO	Georgette Heyer	Venetia	-
K-180	na	Margaret Lynn	To See a Stranger	-
K-181	na	Margaret Summerton	The Sea House	-
K-182	NF	Doris Webster and Mary A. Hopkins	Instant Self-Analysis	-
K-183	na	Phyllis Bentley	The House of Moreys	-
K-184	na	Dorothy Eden	Whistle for the Crows	-
K-185	HO	Shirley Jackson	Hangsaman	-
K-187	na	Henry Bellamann	Victoria Grandolet	-
K-188	NF	Richard E. Byrd	Alone	-
K-189	MY	Dorothy Cameron Disney	The Hangman's Tree	-
K-190	na	Jim Egleson and Janet Frank Egleson	Parents Without Partners	-
K-191	RO	Anne Buxton (as Anne Maybury)	The Brides of Bellenmore	1963
K-192	RO	Sheila Bishop	The House With Two Faces	-
K-193	NF	Franklin S. Klaf and Bernhardt J. Hurwood	A Psychiatrist Looks at Erotica	-
K-194	na	Margaret Summerton	Nightingale at Noon	-
K-195	na	Michael Avallone (as Edwina Noone)	Dark Cypress	-
K-196	na	Joseph Sidney Karnake and Victor Boesen	Navy Diver	-
K-197	MY	Doris Miles Disney	Who Rides a Tiger	-
K-198	na	Josephine Bell	Stranger on a Cliff	-
K-199	na	Barbara O'Brien	Operators and Things	1958
K-200	na	J. L. Whitney	The Whisper of Shadows	-
K-201	RO	Georgette Heyer	April Lady	1964
K-202	na	William Burroughs	Junkie	1964
K-203	na	Jan Hillard	Morgan's Castle	-
K-204	NF	Robert Payne	Charlie Chapin: The Great God Pan	1964
K-205	na	Ruth Willock	The Night of the Visitor	-
K-206	NF	Frank Edwards	Strange World	-
K-207	RO	Lady Eleanor Smith	A Dark and Splendid Passion	-
K-208	NF	Nicole Maxwell	The Jungle Search for Nature's Cures	-
K-209	na	Aileen Seilaz	The Veil of Silence	1965
K-210	NF	Hans Holzer	Ghost Hunter	-
K-211	RO	Anne Buxton (as Anne Maybury)	The Pavilion at Monkshood	1965
K-212	RO	Sheila Bishop	The Durable Fire	-
K-213	na	Michael Avallone (as Edwina Noone)	Dark Cypress	1965
K-215	MY	Rohan O'Grady	The Master of Montrolfe Hall	-
K-216	na	Jan Roffman	The Reflection of Evil	-
K-217	NF	Charles Fort	Lo!	-
K-218	WE	Ross Santee	Cowboy	-
K-219	na	Joan Aiken	The Silence of Herondale	-
K-220	HO	Susan Howatch	The Dark Shore	-
K-221	na	Virginia Coffman	The Beckoning	-
K-222	na	John Macklin	Strange Destinies	-
K-223	na	Michael Avallone (as Edwina Noone)	Corridor of Whispers	-
K-224	na	Brant House	Strange Powers of Unusual People	-
K-225	na	Michael Avallone	The Summer of Evil	-
K-226	RO	Georgette Heyer	Sylvester	-
K-227	RO	Anne Buxton (as Anne Maybury)	Green Fire	-
K-228	NF	Robb Stewart	Strange Prophecies That Came True	-
K-228	na	Joan Winslow	Griffin Towers	-
K-229	NF	R. DeWitt Miller	Impossible: Yet It Happened!	-
K-230	na	Dorothy Eden	The Pretty Ones	-
K-231	na	Lane Peters	Promise Him Anything	-
K-232	RO	Anne Buxton (as Anne Maybury)	The House of Fand	-
K-233	RO	Patricia Robins	Lady Chatterley's Daughter	-
K-234	na	Virginia Coffman	The Devil Vicar	-
K-235	RO	Georgette Heyer	Sprig Muslin	-
K-236	na	Dorothy Eden	Bridge of Fear	-
K-237	NF	Robert Tralins	Strange Events Beyond Human Understanding	-
K-238	RO	Anne Buxton (as Anne Maybury)	Someone Waiting	-
K-239	na	Dorothy Eden	The Sleeping Bride	-
K-240	HO	Susan Howatch	The Waiting Sands	-
K-241	na	Brad Steiger	Strange Guests	-
K-242	HF	Ruth Comfort Mitchell	The Legend of Susan Dane	-
K-243	na	Dorothy Eden	The Deadly Travellers	-
K-244	NF	Kurt Singer (ed.)	The Gothic Reader	-
K-245	na	Marie Garratt	Dangerous Enchantment	-
K-246	HF	Joan Grant	Castle Cloud	-
K-247	WE	Frances Ames	That Callahan Spunk!	1965
K-248	RO	Anne Buxton (as Anne Maybury)	Whisper in the Dark	-
K-249	na	Dorothy Eden	The Brooding Lake	-
K-250	NF	Dr. Webb B. Garrison	Strange Bonds Between Animals and Men	-
K-251	RO	Anne Buxton (as Anne Maybury)	Shadow of a Stranger	-
K-252	MY	Phyllis A. Whitney	The Trembling Hills	-
K-254	NF	Rupert Furneaux	The World's Strangest Mysteries	-
K-255	NF	R. DeWitt Miller	Impossible: Yet It Happened!	-
K-257	RO	Anne Buxton (as Anne Maybury)	I Am Gabriella!	-
K-258	na	Barbara Blackburn	City of Forever	-
K-259	na	Michael Harvey	Strange Happenings	-
K-260	NF	Joan Rich and Leslie Rich	Dating and Mating By Computer	1966
K-261	na	Dorothy Eden	Night of the Letter	1967
K-262	na	Rona Shambrook (as Rona Randall)	Walk Into My Parlor	1966
K-263	RO	Anne Buxton (as Anne Maybury)	The Night My Enemy	1967
K-264	na	Jane Blackmore	The Dark Between the Stars	1967
K-265	RO	Georgette Heyer	The Reluctant Widow	1967
K-266	NF	Thomas R. Henry	The Strangest Things in the World	1967
K-267	na	Dorothy Eden	Listen to Danger	1967
K-268	na	Brad Steiger	Treasure Hunting	-
K-269	na	Rona Shambrook (as Rona Randall)	Seven Days from Midnight	-
K-271	RO	Anne Buxton (as Anne Maybury)	Falcon's Shadow	-
K-272	NF	Hans Holzer	Yankee Ghosts	1966
K-273	na	Rona Shambrook (as Rona Randall)	The Willow Herb	1967
K-275	na	Dorothy Eden	Crow Hollow	1967
K-276	na	Bernhardt J. Hurwood	Strange Talents	1967
K-278	na	Helen Arvonen	Circle of Death	-
K-279	na	Anonymous	The Strange and Uncanny	-
K-280	HO	Susan Howatch	Call in the Night	1967
K-281	MY	Margaret Wetherby Williams (as Margaret Erskine)	No. 9 Belmont Square	1967
K-282	RO	Anne Buxton (as Anne Maybury)	The Winds of Night	-
K-283	RO	Nancy Buckingham	Cloud Over Malverton	1967
K-284	na	Monica Dickens	The Room Upstairs	-
K-285	na	Rona Shambrook (as Rona Randall)	Hotel Deluxe	-
K-286	RO	Nancy Buckingham	The Hour Before Moonrise	-
K-287	MY	Margaret Wetherby Williams (as Margaret Erskine)	Old Mrs. Ommanney is Dead	-
K-288	NF	Robb Stewart	Strange Prophecies That Came True	1967
K-289	na	Jane Blackmore	Night of the Stranger	1967
K-290	na	Jan Roffman	Ashes in an Urn	1966
K-291	na	Brad Steiger	We Have Lived Before	1967
K-292	na	John Macklin	The Enigma of the Unknown	1967
K-293	na	Elizabeth Ford	Dangerous Holiday	1967
K-294	na	Joan Aiken	Beware of the Bouquet	1967
K-295	MY	Margaret Wetherby Williams (as Margaret Erskine)	The Woman at Belguardo	1967
K-296	NF	Warren Smith	Strange Powers of the Mind	-
K-297	RO	Nancy Buckingham	The Dark Summer	1968
K-298	na	Rona Shambrook (as Rona Randall)	The Silver Cord	-
K-299	na	Rae Folly	Fear of a Stranger	-
K-300	na	Michael Hervey	They Walk By Night	-
K-301	na	Dorothy Eden	The Laughing Ghost	-
K-303	NF	Jane Blackmore	Beware the Night	1967
K-304	MY	Margaret Wetherby Williams (as Margaret Erskine)	The Family at Tannerton	1967
K-305	na	John Macklin	Strange Encounters	1968
K-306	HO	Susan Howatch	The Shrouded Walls	1968
K-307	na	Brad Steiger	The Occult World of John Pendragon	1968

== A Series ==
No.	Genre	Author/s	Title	Publ.
A-1	na	Brigitte von Tessin	The Shame and the Glory	1966
A-3	SF	Bernard Wolfe	Limbo	1966
A-4	SF	J. R. R. Tolkien	The Fellowship of the Ring	1965
A-5	SF	J. R. R. Tolkien	The Two Towers	1965
A-6	SF	J. R. R. Tolkien	The Return of the King	1965
A-7	na	The Editors of Short Story International	The World's Best Contemporary Short Stories	1966
A-8	SF	John Myers Myers	Silverlock	1966
A-9	WE	Todhunter Ballard	Gold in California!	1966
A-10	SF	Terry Carr and Donald A. Wollheim (eds.)	The World's Best SF: 1967	1967
A-11	NF	Harold T. Wilkins	Flying Saucers on the Attack	1967
A-12	SF	Terry Carr (ed.)	New Worlds of Fantasy	1967
A-13	SF	James H. Schmitz	The Witches of Karres	1968
A-15	SF	Terry Carr and Donald A. Wollheim (eds.)	World's Best SF: 1968	1968
A-16	SF	Alexei Panshin	Rite of Passage	1968
A-17	SF	Avram Davidson (ed.)	The Best from Fantasy & Science Fiction, 14th Series	1968
A-18	NF	Frederick E. Smith	A Killing for the Hawks	-
A-19	SF	Piers Anthony and Robert E. Margroff	The Ring	1968
A-20	NF	Dorothy Malone	Cookbook for Beginners	1968
A-21	NF	Corinne Griffith	Eggs I Have Known	1968
A-22	NF	Jean Mattimore and Clark Mattimore	Cooking By the Clock	1968
A-23	na	Alberto Moravia	The Wayward Wife	1968
A-24	NF	William A. Bishop	Winged Warfare	1967
A-25	SF	Edgar Rice Burroughs	The Outlaw of Torn	1968
A-26	NF	Peter J. Steincrohn	How to Get a Good Night's Sleep	1968
A-27	NF	Jim Harmon	The Great Radio Heroes	1968
A-28	NF	René Fonck	Ace of Aces	1968
A-29	SF	James Blish and Norman L. Knight	A Torrent of Faces	1968
A-30	NF	Ainslie Meares, M.D.	Relief Without Drugs	-
A-130	na	Robert B. Douglas (trans.)	The Hundred Stories	1968

== N Series ==
Ace Books published its N series from 1965 to 1966, priced at 95 cents.

No.	Genre	Author/s	Title	Publ.
N-1	na	UPI editors	Retrospect 1964: Summaries and Captions from Special U.P.I Dispatches	1965
N-2	na	UPI editors	Retrospect 1965: U.P.I. Pictorial History of 1964	1966
N-3	SF	Frank Herbert	Dune	1965
N-4	na	Isaac Asimov	Is Anyone There?	1966

== Numbered Series ==
No.	Genre	Author/s	Title	Publ.
00075	SF	John Jakes	When the Star Kings Die	-
00078	SF	R.A. Salvatore	The Dragons Dagger	-
00078	SF	Peter George (as Peter Bryant)	Red Alert	1958
00092	SF	John Macklin	Dwellers in Darkness	-
00093	SF	Fred Saberhagen	The Black Mountains	-
00094	SF	Leigh Brackett	The Big Jump	-
00104	SF	Mack Reynolds	Section G: United Planets	-
00106	SF	John Macklin	Passport to the Unknown	-
00107	SF	James White	The Secret Visitors	-
00108	SF	Roger Zelazny	Four for Tomorrow	-
00109	SF	Mark S. Geston	Lords of the Starship	-
00110	SF	Fritz Leiber	Swords in the Mist	-
00111	SF	John W. Campbell, Jr.	Invaders from the Infinite	-
00119	SF	William Shatner	Teksecret	-
00125	SF	Mary Staton	From the Legend of Biel	-
00142	SF	Steve Perry	The Forever Drug	1995
00153	SF	Fritz Leiber	Swords Against Wizardry	-
00241	NF	Jack Luzzatto	Ace Crossword Puzzle Book#2	1969
00265	SF	Mack Reynolds	Ability Quotient	-
00275	SF	Donald A. Wollheim (ed.)	Ace Science Fiction Reader	1971
00289	SF	William Shatner	Tekpower	-
00348	SF	Greg Bear	Blood Music	1996
00390	SF	William Shatner	Tekmoney	-
00950	SF	Ron Goulart	After Things Fell Apart	1970
00958	SF	Mack Reynolds	After Utopia	1977
01000	SF	John Brunner	Age of Miracles	-
01040	SF	Larry Maddock	Agent of T.E.R.R.A.#1: The Flying Saucer Gambit	-
01041	SF	Larry Maddock	Agent of T.E.R.R.A.#2: The Golden Goddess Gambit	-
01042	SF	Larry Maddock	Agent of T.E.R.R.A.#3: The Emerald Elephant Gambit	-
01043	SF	Larry Maddock	Agent of T.E.R.R.A.#4: The Time Trap Gambit	-
01066	SF	Poul Anderson	Agent of the Terran Empire	-
01501	SF	Robert A. Heinlein	The Worlds of Robert A. Heinlein	-
01570	SF	Fletcher Pratt	Alien Planet	-
01625	na	Dick Lupoff and Don Thompson (ed.)	All in Color for a Dime	1970
01750	SF	Robert E. Howard	Almuric	-
01770	SF	Leigh Brackett	Alpha Centauri Or Die	1976
02236	SF	Stanley Schmidt (ed.)	Analog Yearbook Ii	-
02268	SF	Joanna Russ	And Chaos Died	1970
02274	SF	Donald R. Bensen	And Having Writ...	1978
02276	MY	Philip Loraine	The Angel of Death	1961
02295	SF	Keith Roberts	Anita	1970
02320	SF	Alexei Panshin	Masque World	-
02380	SF	Tim Powers	The Anubis Gates	-
02900	na	John Jakes (as Jay Scotland)	Arena	-
02935	SF	Philip Francis Nowlan	Armageddon 2419 A.D.	-
02936	SF	Philip Francis Nowlan	Armageddon 2419 A.D.	-
02938	SF	Philip Francis Nowlan	Armageddon 2419 A.D.	-
02940	na	Rona Randall	The Arrogant Duke	1972
03297	SF	Jack Vance	The Asutra	Dundane Trilogy book 3 of 3) (1973
03300	SF	John Brunner	The Atlantic Abomination	1960
03322	SF	Edgar Rice Burroughs	At the Earth's Core	-
03325	SF	Edgar Rice Burroughs	At the Earth's Core	-
03326	SF	Edgar Rice Burroughs	At the Earth's Core	1978
03328	SF	Edgar Rice Burroughs	At the Earth's Core	1985
04040	SF	Joanna Russ	Picnic on Paradise	-
04591	SF	Samuel R. Delany	Babel-17	1966
04592	SF	Samuel R. Delany	Babel-17	1974
04636	SF	Edgar Rice Burroughs	Back to the Stone Age	-
04722	SF	Samuel R. Delany	The Ballad of Beta 2	-
04745	WE	Edgar Rice Burroughs	The Bandit of Hell's Bend	-
04755	na	E. Kelton	Barbed Wire	-
04760	SF	Tom Purdom	The Barons of Behavior	1972
04860	SF	A. E. van Vogt	The Battle of Forever	1971
05330	SF	Jack London	Before Adam	-
05404	SF	Fred Saberhagen	Berserker	-
05404	SF	Fred Saberhagen	Berserker	1979
05407	SF	Fred Saberhagen	Berserker Man	1979
05407	SF	Fred Saberhagen	Berserker Man	-
05408	SF	Fred Saberhagen	Berserker's Planet	1980
05424	SF	Fred Saberhagen	Berserker Man	-
05454	SF	Edward L. Ferman (ed.)	The Best from Fantasy and Science Fiction, 15th Series	1966
05455	SF	Edward L. Ferman (ed.)	The Best from Fantasy and Science Fiction, 16th Series	-
05456	SF	Edward L. Ferman (ed.)	The Best from Fantasy and Science Fiction, 17th Series	-
05457	SF	Edward L. Ferman (ed.)	The Best from Fantasy and Science Fiction, 18th Series	-
05458	SF	Edward L. Ferman (ed.)	The Best from Fantasy and Science Fiction, 19th Series	1973
05460	SF	Edward L. Ferman (ed.)	The Best from Fantasy and Science Fiction: A Special 25th Anniversary Anthology	-
05461	SF	Edward L. Ferman (ed.)	The Best from Fantasy and Science Fiction, 22nd Series	1978
05475	SF	Lester Del Rey (ed.)	Best Science Fiction Stories of the Year (1st Annual Collection)	1972
05476	SF	Lester Del Rey (ed.)	Best Science Fiction Stories of the Year (2nd Annual Collection)	-
05477	SF	Lester Del Rey (ed.)	Best Science Fiction Stories of the Year (3rd Annual Collection)	1974
05478	SF	Lester Del Rey (ed.)	Best Science Fiction Stories of the Year (4th Annual Collection)	1977
05479	SF	Lester Del Rey (ed.)	Best Science Fiction Stories of the Year (5th Annual Collection)	1977
05481	SF	Mack Reynolds	The Best Ye Breed	-
05496	SF	Fred Saberhagen	Berserker Man	-
05500	SF	Robert A. Heinlein	Between Planets	-
05586	SF	John Varley	The Golden Globe	-
05655	SF	Edgar Rice Burroughs	Beyond the Farthest Star	1973
05656	SF	Edgar Rice Burroughs	Beyond the Farthest Star	1979
05785	SF	Shepherd Mead	The Big Ball of Wax	-
06061	SF	Leigh Brackett	The Big Jump	1976
06171	SF	Jack Vance	Big Planet	1978
06177	SF	Keith Laumer	The Big Show	-
06505	MY	Cornell Woolrich	The Black Angel	1965
06530	SF	Michael Moorcock	The Black Corridor	-
06615	SF	Fred Saberhagen	The Black Mountains	-
06701	SF	John W. Campbell	The Black Star Passes	-
06715	na	Charles Lefebure	The Blood Cults	1969
06854	SF	Marion Zimmer Bradley	The Bloody Sun	-
07012	SF	L. Sprague de Camp and Catherine Crook De Camp	The Bones of Zora	-
07080	na	Joyce Keener	Border-Line	1979
07162	SF	John Brunner	Born Under Mars	-
07180	SF	Marion Zimmer Bradley	The Brass Dragon	-
07200	SF	Jack Vance	The Brave Free Men: Book II of the Durdane Trilogy	1972
07690	SF	Murray Leinster	The Brain-Stealers	-
07840	SF	Ray Cummings	A Brand New World	-
07895	SF	Andre Norton	Breed to Come	1973
07921	MY	Cornell Woolrich	Bride Wore Black	1940
08145	SF	John Rankine	The Bromius Phenomenon	-
08215	SF	Fred Saberhagen	Brother Assassin	-
09022	SF	Robert O'Riodan	Cadre One	-
09037	SF	Spider Robinson	Callahan's Crosstime Saloon	1977
09069	SF	Spider Robinson	Callahan's Crosstime Saloon	-
09072	SF	Spider Robinson	Callahan's Lady	1989
09102	RO	Nancy Buckingham	Call of Glengarron	-
09128	na	Kenneth Von Gunden	K-9 Corps	-
09200	SF	Edgar Rice Burroughs	Carson of Venus	-
09203	SF	Edgar Rice Burroughs	Carson of Venus	-
09205	SF	Edgar Rice Burroughs	Carson of Venus	1982
09265	SF	Andre Norton	Catseye	-
09281	SF	Edgar Rice Burroughs	The Cave Girl	-
09284	SF	Edgar Rice Burroughs	The Cave Girl	-
10150	SF	Walt Richmond	Challenge the Hellmaker	-
10258	SF	Margaret St. Clair	Change the Sky and Other Stories	1974
10307	SF	Ursula K. Le Guin	City of Illusions	1967
10410	SF	A. E. van Vogt	Children of Tomorrow	-
10411	SF	A. E. van Vogt	Children of Tomorrow	-
10471	WE	Sam Bowie	Chisum	1970
10600	SF	Robert A. Heinlein	Citizen of the Galaxy	-
10621	SF	Clifford D. Simak	City	-
10701	SF	Ursula K. Le Guin	City of Illusions	1967
10702	SF	Ursula K. Le Guin	City of Illusion	-
11036	SF	Philip K. Dick	Clans of the Alphane Moon	1972
11222	RO	Nancy Buckingham	Cloud Over Malverton	-
11457	SF	Robert E. Howard, L. Sprague de Camp, and Lin Carter	Conan the Freebooter	-
11467	SF	Robert E. Howard, Björn Nyberg, and L. Sprague de Camp	Conan the Avenger (Conan #10)	-
11546	SF	Leigh Brackett	The Coming of the Terrans	1976
11603	SF	Robert E. Howard (edited by L. Sprague de Camp)	Conan the Conqueror (Conan #9)	-
11622	SF	Anthony Boucher	The Complete Werewolf & Other Stories of Fantasy & Science Fiction	1969
11630	SF	Robert E. Howard, L. Sprague de Camp, and Lin Carter	Conan	-
11633	SF	Robert E. Howard, L. Sprague de Camp, and Lin Carter	Conan the Wanderer	-
11659	SF	Andrew J. Offutt	Conan the Mercenary	1981
11669	SF	L. Sprague de Camp (ed.)	The Spell of Conan	1980
11670	SF	L. Sprague de Camp (ed.)	The Blade of Conan	1979
11671	SF	Robert E. Howard, L. Sprague de Camp, and Lin Carter	Conan	1967
11672	SF	Robert E. Howard, L. Sprague de Camp, and Lin Carter	Conan of Cimmeria	-
11673	SF	Robert Howard, L. Sprague de Camp, and Lin Carter	Conan the Freebooter	-
11674	SF	Robert E. Howard, L. Sprague de Camp, and Lin Carter	Conan the Wanderer	-
11675	SF	Robert E. Howard, L. Sprague de Camp	Conan the Adventurer	-
11676	SF	L. Sprague de Camp and Lin Carter	Conan the Buccaneer	-
11677	SF	Robert E. Howard and L. Sprague de Camp	Conan the Warrior	-
11678	SF	Robert E. Howard and L. Sprague de Camp	Conan the Usurper	-
11679	SF	Robert E. Howard (ed. L. Sprague de Camp)	Conan the Conqueror	-
11680	SF	Robert E. Howard, Björn Nyberg, and L. Sprague de Camp	Conan the Avenger	-
11681	SF	L. Sprague de Camp and Lin Carter	Conan of the Isles	-
11682	SF	L. Sprague de Camp and Lin Carter	Conan of Aquilonia	-
11684	SF	Andrew J. Offutt	Conan and the Sorcerer	1979
11705	SF	Robert Silverberg	Conquerors from the Darkness	-
11759	SF	H. Beam Piper	The Cosmic Computer	-
11863	SF	Robert E. Howard and L. Sprague de Camp	Conan the Freebooter	-
12126	SF	Philip K. Dick	The Crack in Space	1966
12311	SF	Andre Norton	The Crossroads of Time	-
12313	SF	Andre Norton	The Crossroads of Time	1978
13245	SF	Alan Dean Foster	Cyber Way	-
13600	SF	Margaret St. Clair	The Dancers of Noyo	1973
13612	SF	Robert E. Howard and L. Sprague de Camp	Conan the Freebooter	-
13681	na	Marie Garratt	Dangerous Enchantment	-
13795	SF	Andre Norton	Dark Piper	-
13798	SF	A. E. van Vogt	The Darkness on Diamondia	-
13898	SF	Robert Silverberg and Randall Garrett (jointly as Robert Randall)	The Dawning Light	1982
13902	SF	Barry N. Malzberg	The Day of the Burning	-
13921	SF	Thomas Burnett Swann	Day of the Minotaur	-
13960	SF	Mack Reynolds	Day After Tomorrow	-
13972	SF	Brian M. Stableford	Days of Wrath	-
13994	SF	Andre Norton	Daybreak - 2250 A. D.	-
14000	SF	Brian M. Stableford	The Days of Glory	-
14153	MY	Cornell Woolrich (as William Irish)	Deadline at Dawn	-
14165	MY	Jack Vance (as John Holbrook Vance)	The Deadly Isles	-
14194	WE	Nelson Nye	Death Valley Slim	-
14198	WE	John Bickham	Decker's Campaign	-
14215	SF	Greg Benford	Deeper Than the Darkness	-
14235	SF	Andre Norton	The Defiant Agents	1978
14236	SF	Andre Norton	The Defiant Agents	-
14240	WE	Wayne C. Lee	Die-Hard	-
14244	SF	James Schmitz	The Demon Breed	1979
14247	WE	Edgar Rice Burroughs	The Deputy Sheriff of Comanche County	1940
14249	SF	Andre Norton	The Defiant Agents	-
14250	SF	Mack Reynolds	Depression Or Bust! and Dawnman's Planet	-
14251	SF	Poul Anderson, Mildred Downey Broxon, Michael Whelan, and Alicia Austin	The Demon of Scattery	1979
14256	NF	Walter Scott	Demonology & Witchcraft	-
14258	na	David Rome	The Depraved	1968
14277	SF	James Baen (ed.)	Destinies Vol. 1, No. 3 April - June	1979
14879	SF	Timothy Powers	Dinner at the Deviants Palace	-
14903	SF	Frank Herbert	Direct Descent	-
15238	SF	George Warren	Dominant Species	-
15670	SF	Philip K. Dick	Dr. Bloodmoney, Or How We Got Along After the Bomb	1976
15697	SF	Philip K. Dick	The Unteleported Man	1972
16600	SF	Fred Saberhagen	The Dracula Tape	1972
16647	SF	Andre Norton	Dragon Magic	-
16648	SF	Jack Vance	The Dragon Masters	-
16651	SF	Jack Vance	The Dragon-Masters	1981
16668	SF	John Brunner	The Dramaturges of Yan	-
16669	SF	Andre Norton	Dread Companion	1970
16670	SF	Andre Norton	Dread Companion	1970
16701	SF	Roger Zelazny	The Dream Master	-
16728	SF	Larry Niven and Steven Barnes	Dream Park	1983
17239	SF	Ben Bova	The Dueling Machine	-
17625	SF	Frank Herbert	Dune	-
17810	na	Jan Hoffman	A Dying in the Night	1975
18630	SF	Gordon Eklund	The Eclipse Of Dawn	1970
18770	SF	Edgar Rice Burroughs	Master of Adventure	1968
19640	NF	Eliot Asinof	Eight Men Out	1963
19681	SF	Samuel R. Delany	The Einstein Intersection	-
19710	SF	Bob Shaw	A Wreath of Stars	-
20275	SF	Alan Garner	Elidor	-
20563	SF	Fred Saberhagen	Empire of the East	-
20565	SF	Barrington J. Bayley	Empire of Two Worlds	-
20571	SF	Samuel R. Delany	The Ballad of Beta-2 and Empire Star	-
20664	SF	Jerry Pournelle	Endless Frontier, Volume I	-
20670	SF	Judith Merril (ed.)	England Swings Sf: Stories of Speculative Fiction	-
20724	SF	Poul Anderson	Ensign Flandry	-
20730	SF	Keith Laumer	Envoy to New Worlds	-
21562	SF	Edgar Rice Burroughs	Escape on Venus	-
21567	SF	Edgar Rice Burroughs	Escape on Venus	-
21590	SF	James White	The Escape Orbit	1983
21599	SF	Christopher Stasheff	Escape Velocity	-
21803	SF	Edgar Rice Burroughs	The Eternal Savage	-
21804	SF	Edgar Rice Burroughs	The Eternal Savage	-
21806	SF	Edgar Rice Burroughs	The Eternal Savage	-
21885	SF	Jerry Pournelle	Exiles to Glory	1977
22215	SF	Jerry Pournelle	Exiles to Glory	-
22216	SF	Jerry Pournelle	Exiles to Glory	-
22327	NF	Hans Holzer	ESP and You	-
22365	SF	Andre Norton	Exiles of the Stars	-
22375	SF	Andre Norton	Eye of the Monster	-
22386	SF	Philip K. Dick	Eye in the Sky	1975
22387	SF	Philip K. Dick	Eye in the Sky	1980
22500	SF	Jack Vance	The Faceless Man: Book One of the Durdane Trilogy	1978
22555	SF	Jack Vance	The Faceless Man (Dundane Trilogy book 1 of 3)	-
22577	SF	Marion Zimmer Bradley	Falcons of Narabedla	1979
22680	na	Hershatter	Fallout for a Spy	-
22690	SF	Barry N. Malzberg	The Falling Astronauts	-
22725	WE	Nelson Nye	Hellbound for Ballarat	1970
22742	MY	Margaret Erskine	The Family at Tammerton	-
22811	SF	A. E. van Vogt	The Far-Out Worlds of Van Vogt	1968
22812	SF	A. E. van Vogt	The Worlds of A. E. van Vogt	-
22819	SF	Edmund Cooper	A Far Sunset	-
22830	SF	D. G. Compton	Farewell, Earth's Bliss	-
23189	SF	H. Beam Piper	Federation	1982
23419	SF	H. Beam Piper (ed. Michael Kurland)	First Cycle	1982
23929	SF	Dennis Schmidt	Twilight of the Gods: The First Name	-
23998	SF	Shariann Lewitt	First and Final Rites	-
24035	SF	Mack Reynolds	Five Way Secret Agent and Mercenary from Tomorrow	-
24302	na	William Johnston	The Underground Picnic: The Flying Nun#5	1970
24415	NF	John Michell	The Flying Saucer Vision	1967
24590	SF	R. A. Lafferty	Fourth Mansions	1969
24800	SF	Jules Verne	For the Flag	1961
24806	SF	David C. Smith and Richard Tierney	For the Witch of the Mists	1981
24892	SF	H. Beam Piper	Four-Day Planet and Lone Star Planet	-
24903	SF	Roger Zelazny	Four for Tomorrow	-
24975	MY	Jack Vance (as John Holbrook Vance)	The Fox Valley Murders	1968
25165	na	Michael Hervey	Fraternity of the Weird	1969
25300	RO	Georgette Heyer	Friday's Child	1946
25306	SF	Arsen Darnay	A Hostage for Hinterland	1976
25460	SF	Mary Staton	From the Legend of Biel	-
25461	SF	Mary Staton	From the Legend of Biel	-
25950	SF	Suzette Haden Elgin	Furthest	1971
25980	SF	A. E. van Vogt	Future Glitter	1973
26176	SF	H. Beam Piper	Fuzzies and Other People	-
26181	SF	William Tuning	Fuzzy Bones	-
26190	SF	H. Beam Piper	Fuzzy Sapiens, illustrated by Michael Whelan, and Wayne Anderson in 1977	1976
26194	SF	H. Beam Piper	The Fuzzy Papers	-
26196	SF	H. Beam Piper	Fuzzy Sapiens	-
27226	SF	Andre Norton	Galactic Derelict	-
27228	SF	Andre Norton	Galactic Derelict	-
27229	SF	Andre Norton	Galactic Derelict	1978
27232	SF	Jack Vance	Galactic Effectuator	1981
27240	SF	Mack Reynolds	Galactic Medal of Honor	-
27310	SF	Philip K. Dick	The Game-Players of Titan	1972
27346	SF	Philip K. Dick and Ray Nelson	The Ganymede Takeover	1977
27389	SF	Philip José Farmer	The Gates of Creation	1981
27419	SF	Edmund Cooper	A Far Sunset	1977
27501	SF	Samuel R. Delany	The Fall of the Towers	-
27910	SF	Howard Fast	The General Zapped an Angel	-
28702	SF	James P. Blaylock	The Stone Giant	1989
28911	WE	Edgar Rice Burroughs	The Girl from Hollywood	-
28914	na	Michael Avallone	The Girls in Television	1974
29350	na	Harlan Ellison	The Glass Teat	1970
29400	SF	L. Sprague de Camp	The Glory That Was	1979
29525	SF	Robert E. Howard	The Gods of Bal-Sagoth	-
29741	WE	Todhunter Ballard	Gold in California	1965
29743	WE	Todhunter Ballard	Gold in California	1965
29786	na	Peter Bourne	The Golden Pagans	-
30261	SF	Frank Herbert	The Green Brain	-
30262	SF	Frank Herbert	The Green Brain	-
30263	SF	Frank Herbert	The Green Brain	-
30274	SF	Lucius Shepard	Green Eyes	1984
30295	SF	Charles de Lint	Greenmantle	1988
30301	SF	Fritz Leiber	The Green Millennium	-
30590	SF	Louis Trimble and Jacquelyn Trimble	Guardians of the Gate	-
30600	SF	Edwin L. Arnold	Gulliver of Mars	1905
30710	WE	Giles A. Lutz	Gun Rich	-
31557	SF	Andre Norton	The X Factor	-
31590	SF	Leigh Brackett	The Halfling and Other Stories	1973
31725	HO	Shirley Jackson	Hangsaman	-
31781	na	Leal Hayes	Harlequin House	-
31800	SF	Robert A. Heinlein	Have Space Suit - Will Travel	-
31801	SF	Robert A. Heinlein	Have Space Suit - Will Travel	-
31930	na	Jane Blackmore	Hawkridge	1976
31940	NF	John Swenson	Headliners: Kiss: The Greatest Rock Show on Earth!	1978
31941	na	Charley Walters	Headliners: Fleetwood Mac	1979
31986	SF	David Drake	Hammer's Slammers	-
32335	na	Anonymous	The Young Rebels: The Hedgerow Incident	1970
32575	WE	Charles O. Locke	The Hell Bent Kid	-
32800	SF	Frank Herbert	Heretics of Dune	1987
33700	SF	Andre Norton	High Sorcery	-
33701	SF	Andre Norton	High Sorcery	1970
33704	SF	Andre Norton	High Sorcery	-
34245	SF	Fred Saberhagen	The Holmes-Dracula File	1978
34250	NF	N. Fredrik	Hollywood and the Academy Awards	1970
34260	na	Mair Unsworth	Home to My Love	1973
34345	SF	Orson Scott Card	Hot Sleep: The Worthing Chronicle	-
34361	RO	Nancy Buckingham	The Hour Before Moonrise	-
34440	na	Barbara Lane	Housewife Hookers	1973
34441	na	Barbara Lane	Housewife Hookers, Part II	1974
34458	SF	Glenn Lord (ed.)	The Howard Collector	-
34900	SF	Bruce McAllister	Humanity Prime	-
35241	SF	Andre Norton	Huon of the Horn	-
35804	SF	Edgar Rice Burroughs	I Am a Barbarian	-
35805	SF	Edgar Rice Burroughs	I Am a Barbarian	1978
35840	SF	Andre Norton	Ice Crown	1970
35843	SF	Andre Norton	Ice Crown	-
35854	SF	Kim Stanley Robinson	Icehenge	1984
36300	MY	Ron Goulart	If Dying Was All	1971
36321	SF	Andre Norton	Victory on Janus	-
37088	SF	Walt Richmond	The Probability Corner	-
37090	SF	Mark Adlard	Interface	1971
37100	SF	Arthur K. Barnes	Interplanetary Hunter	1972
37106	SF	Brian M. Stableford	In the Kingdom of the Beasts	-
37217	SF	Colin Kapp	The Ion War	1978
37291	SF	Andre Norton	Iron Cage	1974
37365	SF	Robert E. Howard	The Iron Man	-
37381	na	P. Agan	Is That Who I Think It Is? Volume 1	1975
37382	na	P. Agan	Is That Who I Think It Is? Volume 3	1976
37421	SF	H. G. Wells	The Island of Dr. Moreau	1977
37425	SF	Avram Davidson	An Island Under the Earth	1969
37465	SF	Roger Zelazny	Isle of the Dead	1969
37466	SF	Roger Zelazny	Isle of the Dead	1974
37468	SF	Roger Zelazny	Isle of the Dead	1976
37470	SF	Roger Zelazny	Isle of the Dead	1982
37598	MY	Gil Brewer	The Devil in Davos: It Takes a Thief#1	1969
37599	MY	Gil Brewer	Mediterranean Caper: It Takes a Thief#2	1969
37600	MY	Gil Brewer	Appointment in Cairo: It Takes a Thief#3	1970
37797	SF	Esther Friesner	Here Be Demons	-
38120	SF	John Brunner	The Jagged Orbit	1969
38122	SF	John Brunner	The Jagged Orbit	-
38287	SF	Jerry Pournelle	The Janissaries	-
38536	SF	E. C. Tubb	The Jester at Scar: Dumarest of Terra#5	1982
38570	SF	C. L. Moore	Jirel of Joiry	-
40590	MY	Ron Goulart	Too Sweet to Die	1972
40850	SF	Robert Sheckley	The Journey of Joenes	-
41550	na	Jerry Bladwin	Kept Man	1975
41550	SF	Andre Norton	Judgement on Janus	-
41551	SF	Andre Norton	Judgement on Janus	-
41841	na	William Burroughs	Junkie	1964
42801	SF	E. C. Tubb	Kalin	-
43525	SF	Dennis Schmidt	Kensho	-
43672	SF	Andre Norton	A Key Out of Time	1978
43679	SF	Andre Norton	A Key Out of Time	-
44470	SF	Edgar Wallace and Merian C. Cooper	King Kong	1976
44485	SF	Christopher Stasheff	King Kobold	-
44489	SF	Christopher Stasheff	King Kobold Revived	-
44512	na	Bernhardt Hurwood	Kingdom of the Spiders	1977
45000	SF	Andre Norton	Knave of Dreams	1976
45001	SF	Andre Norton	Knave of Dreams	-
46272	SF	Edgar Rice Burroughs	The Lad and the Lion	1978
46850	SF	Thomas Burnett Swann	Lady of the Bees	-
46996	SF	Edgar Rice Burroughs	Land of Terror	-
46997	SF	Edgar Rice Burroughs	Land of Terror	-
47000	SF	Edgar Rice Burroughs	Land of Terror	1978
47013	SF	Edgar Rice Burroughs	The Land of Hidden Men	-
47020	SF	Edgar Rice Burroughs	The Land That Time Forgot	-
47022	SF	Edgar Rice Burroughs	The Land That Time Forgot	-
47023	SF	Edgar Rice Burroughs	The Land That Time Forgot	-
47026	SF	Edgar Rice Burroughs	The Land That Time Forgot	-
47042	SF	Jack Vance	The Languages of Pao	-
47161	SF	Andre Norton	The Last Planet	-
47162	SF	Andre Norton	The Last Planet	-
47440	SF	Andre Norton	Lavender-Green Magic	1977
47800	SF	Ursula K. Le Guin	The Left Hand of Darkness	1969
47805	SF	Ursula K. Le Guin	The Left Hand of Darkness	1976
48494	SF	H. Beam Piper	Little Fuzzy, illustrated by Wayne Anderson in 1977	1962
48520	SF	Fred Saberhagen	The Berserker Wars	-
48862	NF	Charles Fort	Lo!	-
48877	WE	Giles A. Lutz	The Lonely Ride	-
48918	WE	Nelson Nye	Long Run	-
48970	SF	Mack Reynolds	Looking Backward, from the Year 2000	1973
49051	SF	H. Beam Piper	Lord Kalvan of Otherwhen	-
49236	SF	Andre Norton	Lord of Thunder	-
49294	SF	Edgar Rice Burroughs	The Lost Continent	-
49501	SF	Edgar Rice Burroughs	Lost on Venus	-
49504	SF	Edgar Rice Burroughs	Lost on Venus	-
49506	SF	Edgar Rice Burroughs	Lost on Venus	-
49507	SF	Edgar Rice Burroughs	Lost on Venus	-
49548	SF	Fred Saberhagen	Love Conquers All	-
49851	SF	Allen Steele	Orbital Decay	-
50485	SF	Allen Steele	Lunar Descent	-
50530	SF	Jack Vance	Suldrun's Garden (Lyonesse Trilogy Book 1 of 3)	1987
50531	SF	Jack Vance	Madouc (Lyonesse Trilogy: book 3 of 3)	1990
51356	SF	Steve Perry	The Machiavelli Interface	1986
51388	SF	Michael Moorcock	The Mad God's Amulet	-
51401	SF	Edgar Rice Burroughs	The Mad King	-
51402	SF	Edgar Rice Burroughs	The Mad King	-
51403	SF	Edgar Rice Burroughs	The Mad King	-
51404	SF	Edgar Rice Burroughs	The Mad King	-
51409	SF	Edgar Rice Burroughs	The Mad King	-
51544	SF	Larry Niven	The Magic Goes Away	1978
51550	na	Adeline McElfresh	The Magic of Dr. Farrar	1965
51590	SF	John Eric Holmes	Mahars of Pellucidar	-
51624	SF	Philip José Farmer	The Maker of Universes	-
51626	na	Rachel Cosgrove Payes	Malverne Hall	1970
51642	WE	Ray Hogan	The Man from Barranca Negra	-
51647	SF	Brian Aldiss	The Malacia Tapestry	1976
51700	TH	David McDaniel	The Hollow Crown Affair	1969
51701	na	Peter Leslie	The Unfair Fare Affair	1968
51702	SF	Edgar Rice Burroughs	The Mad King	-
51702	TH	John T. Phillifent	The Power Cube Affair	-
51703	TH	John T. Phillifent	The Corfu Affair	1967
51704	na	Joel Bernard	The Thinking Machine Affair	1967
51705	na	John Oram Thomas (as John Oram)	The Stone-Cold Dead in the Market Affair	-
51706	na	Peter Leslie	The Finger in the Spy Affair	1966
51910	SF	Philip K. Dick	The Man Who Japed	1975
51918	SF	Steve Perry	The Man Who Never Missed	1986
51941	na	Bruce Cassiday	The Fire's Center; Marcus Welby#3	1971
51943	SF	David Alexander Smith	Marathon	-
52075	SF	Henry Kuttner, Bob Pepper, and Alicia Austin	The Mask of Circe	1971
52077	SF	Fred Saberhagen	The Mask of the Sun	-
52078	SF	Fred Saberhagen	The Mask of the Sun	-
52110	na	Jennifer Sills	Massage Parlor	1973
52207	SF	Steve Perry	Matadora	1986
52400	SF	John Brunner	Meeting at Infinity	-
52470	SF	Donald A. Wollheim (ed.)	Men on the Moon	-
52560	SF	Alan E. Nourse	The Mercy Men	-
52740	WE	L. P. Homes	The Maverick Star	1969
52975	SF	Gerard F. Conway	The Midnight Dancers	-
53151	SF	John W. Campbell	The Mightiest Machine	-
53167	SF	Algis Budrys, Charles G. Waugh, and Martin Harry Greenberg (eds.)	Space Dogfights	1992
53183	SF	John Varley	Millennium	-
53299	SF	Spider Robinson	Mindkiller	-
53355	SF	Ian Watson	Miracle Visitors	-
53503	SF	Andrew J. Offutt	The Mists of Doom	-
53540	SF	George Zebrowski	The Monadic Universe	-
53570	SF	D. G. Compton	The Missionaries	1972
53587	SF	Edgar Rice Burroughs	The Monster Men	-
53588	SF	Edgar Rice Burroughs	The Monster Men	-
53591	SF	Edgar Rice Burroughs	The Monster Men	-
53701	SF	Edgar Rice Burroughs	The Moon Maid	-
53702	SF	Edgar Rice Burroughs	The Moon Maid	-
53703	SF	Edgar Rice Burroughs	The Moon Maid	-
53705	SF	Edgar Rice Burroughs	The Moon Maid	-
53719	SF	Charles de Lint	Moonheart	1984
53753	SF	Edgar Rice Burroughs	The Moon Men	-
53756	SF	Edgar Rice Burroughs	The Moon Men	-
53780	SF	John W. Campbell	The Moon is Hell	-
54101	SF	Andre Norton	Moon of 3 Rings	-
54201	SF	Thomas Burnett Swann	Moondust	-
54325	na	Rona Randall	Mountain of Fear	1971
54378	na	Virginia Coffman	Moura	1963
54380	na	Virginia Coffman	Moura	1963
54460	na	Edgar Rice Burroughs	The Mucker	1974
54462	SF	Edgar Rice Burroughs	The Mucker	1914
54484	SF	Charles de Lint	Mulengro: A Romany Tale	1985
54500	SF	Mark Adlard	Multiface	1975
55145	SF	Fritz Leiber	You're All Alone	1973
55309	SF	Fred Saberhagen	The Mask of the Sun	-
56010	SF	Gordon R. Dickson	Naked to the Stars	-
56940	SF	Leigh Brackett	The Nemesis from Terra	1976
57752	SF	Andre Norton	Night of Masks	-
57975	na	Margaret Summerton	Nightingale at Noon	-
58024	SF	Mark E. Rogers	The Nightmare of God	1988
58050	SF	R. A. Lafferty	Nine Hundred Grandmothers	1970
58875	na	Jesse Kornbluth	Notes from the New Underground	1968
60563	SF	Edgar Rice Burroughs	The Oakdale Affair	-
60564	SF	Edgar Rice Burroughs	The Oakdale Affair	-
60739	SF	Fred Saberhagen	Octagon	1981
61480	na	The Editors of Science & Mechanics (compilers)	The Official Guide to UFO's	1968
62160	SF	Fred Saberhagen	Old Friend of the Family	1979
62380	SF	George Zebrowski	The Omega Point	-
62938	SF	Bob Shaw	One Million Tomorrows	-
63165	SF	Kenneth Bulmer	On the Symb-Socket Circuit	1972
63410	SF	Andre Norton	Operation Time Search	-
63590	SF	John Rankine	Operation Umanaq	1973
63780	SF	Bob Shaw	Orbitsville	-
64146	SF	John Dechancie	Paradox Alley	1987
64240	SF	Bob Shaw	Other Days, Other Eyes	-
64400	SF	Philip K. Dick	Our Friends from Frolix 8	1970
64401	SF	Philip K. Dick	Our Friends from Frolix 8	1977
64484	SF	Edgar Rice Burroughs	Out of Times Abyss	-
64512	WE	Edgar Rice Burroughs	The Outlaw of Torn	-
64514	SF	Edgar Rice Burroughs	The Outlaw of Torn	-
65050	SF	Bob Shaw	The Palace of Eternity	-
65125	SF	Jack Williamson	The Pandora Effect	1969
65169	SF	H. Beam Piper	Paratime	1981
65316	SF	Larry Niven	The Patchwork Girl	1981
65353	SF	Fred Saberhagen	Octagon	-
65390	SF	Colin Kapp	Patterns of Chaos	1978
65412	SF	Edgar Rice Burroughs	The Outlaw of Torn	1973
65430	SF	Keith Roberts	Pavane	1966
65442	RO	Anne Maybury	The Pavilion at Monkshood	1973
65852	SF	Edgar Rice Burroughs	Pellucidar	-
65855	SF	Edgar Rice Burroughs	Pellucidar	-
65873	na	Eliot Asinof	People vs. Blutcher	1971
65890	SF	Jack Williamson	People Machines	-
65941	SF	Edgar Rice Burroughs	The People That Time Forgot	-
65942	SF	Edgar Rice Burroughs	The People That Time Forgot	-
65946	SF	Edgar Rice Burroughs	The People That Time Forgot	-
65948	SF	Mack Reynolds	Perchance to Dream	-
66050	MY	Cornell Woolrich	Phantom Lady	-
66100	SF	Avram Davidson	The Phoenix and the Mirror	-
66141	SF	Walt Richmond and Leigh Richmond	Phase 2	-
66201	SF	Joanna Russ	Picnic on Paradise	-
66320	SF	Robert E. Howard	Pigeons from Hell	1978
66502	SF	Edgar Rice Burroughs	Pirates of Venus	-
66503	SF	Edgar Rice Burroughs	Pirates of Venus	-
66505	SF	Edgar Rice Burroughs	Pirates of Venus	-
66509	SF	Edgar Rice Burroughs	Pirates of Venus	-
66833	SF	Andre Norton	Plague Ship	1973
66900	SF	Jack Vance	Planet of Adventure#2: Servants of the Wankh	-
66901	SF	Jack Vance	Planet of Adventure#3: The Dirdir	1969
66902	SF	Jack Vance	Planet of Adventure#4: The Pnume	1970
66952	SF	Ursula K. Le Guin	Planet of Exile	-
67020	SF	Marion Zimmer Bradley	The Planet Savers	-
67025	SF	Marion Zimmer Bradley	The Planet Savers and The Sword of Aldones	-
67060	SF	John Jakes	The Planet Wizard	-
67061	SF	John Jakes	The Planet Wizard	-
67110	MY	Jack Vance (as John Holbrook Vance)	The Pleasant Grove Murder	-
67131	WE	L. L. Foreman	Plundering Gun	-
67145	SF	Michael Kurland	Pluribus	-
67402	SF	Robert A. Heinlein	Podkayne of Mars	-
67555	SF	Andre Norton	Postmarked the Stars	1969
67800	SF	Philip K. Dick	The Preserving Machine	1969
67801	SF	Philip K. Dick	The Preserving Machine	1976
67900	SF	Thomas M. Disch	The Prisoner	1969
67901	SF	David McDaniel	The Prisoner#2	-
67902	SF	Hank Stine	The Prisoner#3	1970
67937	SF	L. Sprague de Camp	The Prisoner of Zhamanak	-
68023	SF	Gordon R. Dickson	Pro	-
68305	SF	Stephen Robinette	Projections	-
69168	SF	Arsen Darnay	The Purgatory Zone	1981
69190	SF	L. Sprague de Camp	The Purple Pterodactyls: The Adventures of Wilson Newbury, Ensorcelled Financier	1980
69540	SF	D. G. Compton	The Quality of Mercy	-
69658	SF	L. Sprague de Camp	The Queen of Zamba	-
69681	SF	Andre Norton	Quest Crosstime	-
69682	SF	Andre Norton	Quest Crosstime	-
69683	SF	Andre Norton	Quest Crosstime	-
69684	SF	Andre Norton	Quest Crosstime	-
69700	SF	A. E. van Vogt	Quest for the Future	-
69770	SF	Poul Anderson	Question and Answer	-
69992	SF	Jack L. Chalker	Quintara Marathon#1: The Demons at Rainbow Bridge	-
71000	WA	Manfred von Richthofen	The Red Baron	1969
71001	WA	Manfred von Richthofen	The Red Baron	-
71065	SF	Alfred Coppel (as Robert Cham Gilman)	The Rebel of Rhada	1968
71076	WE	Clifton Adams	Reckless Men	-
71083	SF	E. C. Tubb	Lallia: Dumarest of Terra#6	1982
71100	SF	Andre Norton	Red Hart Magic	1979
71140	SF	Robert A. Heinlein	Red Planet	-
71156	SF	David C. Smith and Richard L. Tierney	The Ring of Ikribu: Red Sonja#1	1981
71157	SF	David C. Smith and Richard L. Tierney	Demon Night: Red Sonja#2	1982
71158	SF	David C. Smith and Richard L. Tierney	When Hell Laughs: Red Sonja#3	1982
71159	SF	David C. Smith and Richard L. Tierney	Endithor's Daughter: Red Sonja#4	1982
71160	SF	D. D. Chapman and Deloris Lehman	Tarzan Red Tide	-
71161	SF	David C. Smith and Richard L. Tierney	Against the Prince of Hell: Red Sonja#5	1983
71162	SF	David C. Smith and Richard L. Tierney	Star of Doom: Red Sonja#6	1983
71335	SF	Philip José Farmer	Behind the Walls of Terra	1970
71435	SF	John T. Sladek	Mechasm	-
71500	SF	A. E. van Vogt	The Silkie	-
71502	SF	Keith Laumer	Retief at Large	-
71803	SF	E. C. Tubb	Lallia	-
71816	WE	Edgar Rice Burroughs	The Return of the Mucker	-
72280	na	Edgar Rice Burroughs	The Rider	1915
72360	WE	John Callahan	Ride the Wild Land & Jernigan	1965
73293	SF	Ursula K. Le Guin	Rocannon's World	-
73330	SF	Robert A. Heinlein	Rocket Ship Galileo	-
73425	WE	L. L. Foreman	Rogue's Legacy	1968
73438	SF	Kenneth Bulmer	Roller Coaster World	-
73440	SF	Robert A. Heinlein	The Rolling Stones	-
73441	SF	Robert A. Heinlein	The Rolling Stones	-
73450	SF	Mack Reynolds	Rolltown	-
73471	na	Monica Dickens	The Room Upstairs	-
73532	SF	Andre Norton	Secret of the Lost Race	-
74860	SF	Robert A. Heinlein	To Sail Beyond the Sunset	-
74981	SF	Andre Norton	Sargasso of Space	-
74982	SF	Andre Norton	Sargasso of Space	-
75045	SF	Mack Reynolds	Satellite City	-
75131	SF	Edgar Rice Burroughs	Savage Pellucidar	-
75134	SF	Edgar Rice Burroughs	Savage Pellucidar	-
75136	SF	Edgar Rice Burroughs	Savage Pellucidar	-
75181	na	Jean Vicary	Saverstall	-
75441	SF	Sam J. Lundwall	Science Fiction: What It's All About	1977
75617	WE	Ray Hogan	Showdown on Texas Flat	-
75690	SF	George Bamber	The Sea Is Boiling Hot	-
75695	SF	Andre Norton	Sea Siege	-
75696	SF	Andre Norton	Sea Siege	-
75750	na	Sax Rohmer	The Secret of Holm Peel and Other Strange Stories	1970
75800	SF	George Bamber	The Sea Is Boiling Hot	1971
75830	SF	Andre Norton	Secret of the Lost Race	-
75831	SF	Andre Norton	Secret of the Lost Race	-
75832	SF	Andre Norton	Secret of the Lost Race	-
75833	SF	Andre Norton	Secret of the Lost Race	1978
75834	SF	Andre Norton	Secret of the Lost Race	1981
75835	SF	Andre Norton	Secret of the Lost Race	-
75836	SF	Andre Norton	Secret of the Lost Race	-
75860	SF	Mack Reynolds	Section G: United Planets	-
75875	SF	Robert Silverberg	The Seeds of Earth	-
75894	SF	Eric Frank Russell	Sentinels from Space	-
75940	SF	Marion Zimmer Bradley	Seven from the Stars	-
75945	MY	Ron Goulart	The Same Lie Twice	1973
75958	NF	Brad Steiger	Sex and Satanism	1969
75980	na	Barbara Levins	Sexual Power of Marijuana	-
75987	na	Ruth Abbey	The Shadow Between	1974
76015	WE	Robert Mccaig	The Shadow Maker	1970
76098	SF	Bob Shaw	Ship of Strangers	-
76099	SF	Robert E. Howard	The She Devil	1983
76181	WE	Louis L'Amour (as Jim Mayo)	Showdown at Yellow Butte	-
76219	SF	Robert Silverberg and Randall Garrett (jointly as Robert Randall)	The Shrouded Planet	1982
76343	SF	Charles Sheffield	Sight of Proteus	-
76385	SF	D. G. Compton	The Silent Multitude	-
76390	SF	Robert Silverberg	The Silent Invaders	-
76391	SF	Robert Silverberg	The Silent Invaders	1977
76500	SF	A. E. van Vogt	The Silkie	-
76501	SF	A. E. van Vogt	The Silkie	-
76502	SF	A. E. van Vogt	The Silkie	-
76701	SF	Philip K. Dick	The Simulacra	1976
76801	SF	Andre Norton	The Sioux Spaceman	-
76802	SF	Andre Norton	The Sioux Spaceman	-
76836	SF	Walt Richmond and Leigh Richmond	Siva!	1979
76942	SF	Harry Harrison	Skyfall	1978
76972	na	Dorothy Eden	Sleep in the Woods	1967
77051	MY	Margaret Erskine	Sleep No More	-
77408	SF	Rudy Rucker	Software	-
77410	SF	Philip K. Dick	Solar Lottery	1974
77411	SF	Philip K. Dick	Solar Lottery	1975
77419	SF	Gordon R. Dickson	Soldier, Ask Not	1982
77425	na	Betty Deforrest	The Shows of Yesterday	-
77427	SF	Brian Herbert (ed.)	The Poetry of Frank Herbert: Songs of Muad'dib	-
77471	RO	Anne Maybury	Someone Waiting	1961
77520	WE	Wayne Lee	Son of a Gunman	-
77551	SF	Andre Norton	Sorceress of the Witch World	-
77554	SF	Andre Norton	Sorceress of the Witch World	1968
77598	na	Kenneth Von Gunden	The Sounding Stillness	-
77620	SF	Robert E. Howard	The Sowers of the Thunder	1979
77730	SF	Robert A. Heinlein	Space Cadet	-
77780	SF	H. Beam Piper	Space Viking	-
77782	SF	Mack Reynolds	Space Visitor	-
77783	SF	Mack Reynolds	Space Visitor	-
77791	SF	Fred Saberhagen	Specimens	-
77841	na	S. E. Stevenson	Spring Magic	-
77905	na	Jane Blackmore	The Square of Many Colours	-
77918	WE	James Powell	Stage to Seven Springs	-
77953	SF	Marion Zimmer Bradley	Star of Danger	-
78000	SF	Robert A. Heinlein	The Star Beast	-
78011	SF	Andre Norton	Star Born	-
78035	SF	Keith Laumer	Star Colony	-
78071	SF	Andre Norton	Star Gate	-
78318	SF	Pamela Sargent	Starshadows	-
78432	SF	Andre Norton	The Stars Are Ours	-
78477	SF	Gerry Turnbull (ed.)	A Star Trek Catalog: The Complete Guide to the Fantastic World of Star Trek	1979
78479	SF	Ben Bova	Star Watchman	-
78500	na	Warren Smith	Strange & Miraculous Cures	1969
78565	SF	John Varley	Steel Beach	-
78575	SF	D. G. Compton	The Steel Crocodile	1970
78585	SF	Jerry Pournelle	A Step Farther Out	-
78650	SF	Philip José Farmer	The Stone God Awakens	1970
78651	SF	Philip José Farmer	The Stone God Awakens	1973
78652	SF	Philip José Farmer	The Stone God Awakens	1975
78653	SF	Philip José Farmer	The Stone God Awakens	1979
78654	SF	Philip José Farmer	The Stone God Awakens	1980
78657	SF	Poul Anderson	Dominic Flandry: A Stone in Heaven	-
78741	SF	Andre Norton	Storm Over Warlock	-
78742	SF	Andre Norton	Storm Over Warlock	1973
78830	WE	Giles A. Lutz	The Stranger	-
78901	NF	Brad Steiger	Strange Guests	1966
79001	na	Bernhardt J. Hurwood	Strange Talents	-
79034	SF	Robert A. Heinlein	Stranger in a Strange Land	-
79112	SF	Marion Zimmer Bradley	Survey Ship	-
79141	SF	Leigh Brackett	The Sword of Rhiannon	-
79150	SF	Fritz Leiber	Swords Against Death	-
79157	SF	Fritz Leiber	Swords Against Death	-
79161	SF	Fritz Leiber	Swords Against Wizardry	-
79165	SF	Fritz Leiber	Swords Against Wizardry	-
79170	SF	Fritz Leiber	Swords and Deviltry	-
79176	SF	Fritz Leiber	Swords and Deviltry	-
79181	SF	Fritz Leiber	Swords in the Mist	-
79185	SF	Fritz Leiber	Swords in the Mist	-
79221	SF	Fritz Leiber	The Swords of Lankhmar	-
79222	SF	Fritz Leiber	The Swords of Lankhmar	-
79431	SF	Andre Norton	The Stars Are Ours	-
79791	SF	Edgar Rice Burroughs	Tanar of Pellucidar	-
79797	SF	Edgar Rice Burroughs	Tanar of Pellucidar	-
79805	WE	Roy Manning	Tangled Trail	-
79854	SF	Edgar Rice Burroughs	Tarzan at the Earth's Core	-
79970	MY	Isobel Lambot	A Taste of Murder	-
80010	SF	William Shatner	Teklords	-
80011	SF	William Shatner	Teklab	-
80012	SF	William Shatner	Tekvengeance	-
80180	SF	James Tiptree, Jr.	Ten Thousand Light-Years from Home	-
80208	SF	William Shatner	Tekwar	-
80400	WE	Nelson Nye	The Texas Gun	-
80575	WE	Nelson Nye	Thief River	-
80661	MY	Mildred Davis	The Third Half	-
80680	SF	Robert Lory	The Thirteen Bracelets	-
80691	SF	Roger Zelazny	This Immortal	-
80705	SF	Robert E. Howard	Tigers of the Sea	-
80780	SF	Robert E. Howard	Three-Bladed Doom	1979
80801	SF	Andre Norton	Three Against the Witch World	-
80805	SF	Andre Norton	Three Against the Witch World	1978
80855	SF	Alexei Panshin	The Thurb Revolution	1978
80933	SF	Spider Robinson	Time Pressure	1988
81000	SF	Clifford D. Simak	Time & Again	-
81001	SF	Clifford D. Simak	Time & Again	-
81012	SF	Keith Laumer	The Time Bender	-
81125	SF	Robert A. Heinlein	Time for the Stars	-
81126	SF	Robert A. Heinlein	Time for the Stars	-
81251	SF	Andre Norton	The Time Traders	-
81253	SF	Andre Norton	The Time Traders	-
81254	SF	Andre Norton	The Time Traders	1984
81270	SF	John Brunner	Times Without Number	1969
81277	SF	Spider Robinson	Time Travelers Strictly Cash	1981
81656	SF	Bob Shaw	Tomorrow Lies in Ambush	-
81670	SF	Mack Reynolds	Tomorrow Might Be Different	-
81900	SF	Thomas Burnett Swann	The Tournament of Thorns	-
81973	SF	E. C. Tubb	Toyman: Dumarest of Terra#3	-
82210	SF	John Brunner	The Traveler in Black	-
82355	SF	Andre Norton	Trey of Swords	1978
82401	WE	Ernest Haycox	Trigger Trio	-
82410	WE	D. B. Newton	Triple Trouble	-
82430	WE	Nelson Nye	Trouble at Quinn's Crossing	-
82660	SF	Robert A. Heinlein	Tunnel in the Sky	-
84000	SF	Andre Norton	Uncharted Stars	-
84292	SF	H. Beam Piper	Uller Uprising	-
84331	SF	John W. Campbell	The Ultimate Weapon	-
84514	SF	Andrew Offutt	The Undying Wizard	-
84569	SF	Axel Madsen	Unisave	-
84581	SF	A. E. van Vogt	The Universe Maker	-
85456	SF	Alan E. Nourse	The Universe Between	1987
85460	WA	Harold E. Hartney	Up & At 'Em	-
86022	na	Virginia Coffman	Vampire of Moura	-
86050	SF	Philip K. Dick	The Variable Man and Other Stories	1976
86064	SF	Fred Saberhagen	The Veils of Azlaroc	-
86065	SF	Fred Saberhagen	The Veils of Azlaroc	-
86180	SF	E. C. Tubb	Veruchia	-
86181	SF	E. C. Tubb	Veruchia: Dumarest of Terra#8	1982
86190	SF	Ian Watson	Very Slow Time Machine	-
86607	SF	Mark Adlard	Volteface	1972
86608	SF	Philip K. Dick	Vulcan's Hammer	1972
86610	SF	Andre Norton, Wojciech Siudmak, and Alicia Austin	Voorloper	1980
87015	MY	Philip Loraine	One to Curtis	1967
87060	SF	Michael Moorcock	The Warlord of the Air	1971
87070	na	Daoma Winston	Walk Around the Square	1975
87101	na	Rona Randall	Walk Into My Parlor	-
87180	SF	A. E. van Vogt	The War Against the Rull	-
87201	SF	Poul Anderson	War of the Wing-Men	-
87269	SF	George Zebrowski	Ashes & Stars	-
87300	SF	Christopher Stasheff	The Warlock in Spite of Himself	-
87301	SF	Christopher Stasheff	The Warlock in Spite of Himself	-
87319	SF	Andre Norton	Warlock of the Witch World	-
87321	SF	Andre Norton	Warlock of the Witch World	-
87322	SF	Andre Norton	Warlock of the Witch World	-
87323	SF	Andre Norton	Warlock of the Witch World	1978
87325	SF	Christopher Stasheff	Warlock Unlocked	-
87328	SF	Christopher Stasheff	Warlock Unlocked	-
87332	SF	Christopher Stasheff	Warlock Unlocked	-
87370	na	Herman Raucher	Watermelon Man	-
87600	SF	Michael Moorcock	The Warlord of the Air	1973
87625	SF	Dennis Schmidt	Way-Farer	-
87631	SF	H. G. Wells	The War of the Worlds	1988
87718	MY	Harlan Ellison	Web of the City	1983
87855	SF	A. E. van Vogt	The Weapons Shops of Isher	-
87873	SF	Andre Norton	Web of the Witch World	-
87874	SF	Andre Norton	Web of the Witch World	-
87875	SF	Andre Norton	Web of the Witch World	-
87941	SF	Thomas Burnett Swann	The Weirwoods	-
88010	WE	T. V. Olsen	Westward They Rode	-
88065	SF	Edmond Hamilton	What's It Like Out There? (And Other Stories)	-
88075	na	Richard Lamparski	Whatever Became Of.....? Volume I	-
88076	na	Richard Lamparski	Whatever Became Of.....? Volume II	1970
88091	SF	H. G. Wells	When the Sleeper Wakes	-
88270	SF	Thomas Burnett Swann	Where Is the Bird of Fire?	1970
88440	na	Nelle McFather	Whispering Island	-
88554	na	Dorothy Eden	Whistle for the Grows	-
88564	SF	Rudy Rucker	White Light	-
88601	SF	Clifford D. Simak	Why Call Them Back from Heaven?	-
89237	SF	Philip José Farmer	The Wind Whales of Ishmael	-
89251	SF	Marion Zimmer Bradley	The Winds of Darkover	-
89701	SF	Andre Norton	Witch World	-
89702	SF	Andre Norton	Witch World	-
89851	SF	James H. Schmitz	The Witches of Karres	-
90050	na	Charles Lefebure	Witness to Witchcraft	1970
90075	SF	Ursula K. Le Guin	A Wizard of Earthsea	-
90110	RO	Georgette Heyer	Venetia	1958
90190	SF	Edgar Rice Burroughs	The Wizard of Venus and Pirate Blood	-
90191	SF	Edgar Rice Burroughs	The Wizard of Venus	1973
90194	SF	Edgar Rice Burroughs	The Wizard of Venus and Pirate Blood	-
90426	WE	Lee Hoffman	Gunfight at Laramie	-
90701	na	Robert J. Hogan	The Wolver	-
90872	SF	R.A. Salvatore	The Woods Out Back	-
90926	SF	Frank Herbert	The Worlds of Frank Herbert	1971
90951	SF	Philip K. Dick	The World Jones Made	1975
90955	SF	Jack Vance	The Worlds of Jack Vance	-
91010	SF	Gregory Frost	Lyrec	1984
91052	SF	John Carr (ed.)	The Worlds of H. Beam Piper	-
91055	SF	Poul Anderson	The Worlds of Poul Anderson	-
91060	SF	Theodore Sturgeon	The Worlds of Theodore Sturgeon	-
91170	SF	Marion Zimmer Bradley	The World Wreckers	-
91352	SF	Donald A. Wollheim and Terry Carr (eds.)	World's Best Science Fiction, 1969	-
91353	SF	Donald A. Wollheim and Terry Carr (eds.)	World's Best Science Fiction, First Series	-
91354	SF	Donald A. Wollheim and Terry Carr (eds.)	World's Best Science Fiction, Second Series	-
91355	SF	Donald A. Wollheim and Terry Carr (eds.)	World's Best Science Fiction, Third Series	-
91356	SF	Donald A. Wollheim and Terry Carr (eds.)	World's Best Science Fiction, Fourth Series	-
91357	SF	Donald A. Wollheim and Terry Carr (eds.)	World's Best Science Fiction, 1970	-
91358	SF	Donald A. Wollheim and Terry Carr (eds.)	World's Best Science Fiction, 1971	-
91359	SF	Frederik Pohl	Best Sf for 1972	-
91502	SF	Robert A. Heinlein	The Worlds of Robert A. Heinlein	1973
91581	SF	Keith Laumer	Worlds of the Imperium	-
91640	SF	Fritz Leiber	The Worlds of Fritz Leiber	-
91706	SF	Poul Anderson	World Without Stars	-
91770	SF	Robert E. Howard	Worms of the Earth	-
92551	SF	Andre Norton	The X Factor	-
92553	SF	Andre Norton	The X Factor	-
94200	SF	Wilson Tucker	The Year of the Quiet Sun	1970
94251	SF	Andre Norton	Year of the Unicorn	-
94254	SF	Andre Norton	Year of the Unicorn	1979
95490	SF	Andre Norton	Zarsthor's Bane	1978
95501	NF	Arch Whitehouse	The Zeppelin Fighters	-
95941	SF	Andre Norton	Zarsthor's Bane	-
95960	SF	Andre Norton	The Zero Stone	-
95961	SF	Andre Norton	The Zero Stone	-
95964	SF	Andre Norton	The Zero Stone	1981
