= Brant House =

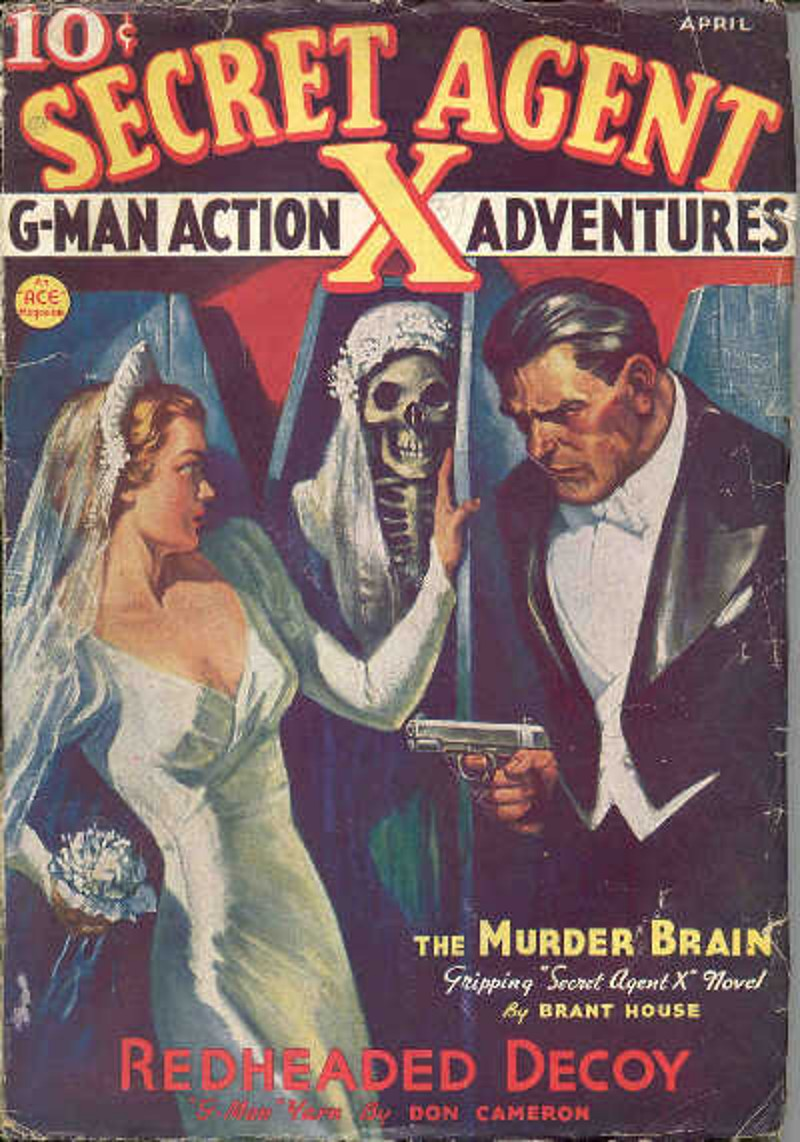
Cover of "Secret Agent" Magazine for April 1937 showing inclusion of story by Brant House

"Brant House" was a pen name or "house" name used by the staff of Ace Books. The name appears many times as author or editor in the List of Ace single volumes between 1952 and 1978. It is also referred to in the article about the Ace publication, Secret Agent X, where the following authors are credited with writing one or more episodes:

- Paul Chadwick
- G. T. Fleming-Roberts
- Emile C. Tepperman
- Wayne Rogers
