= Escape While I Can =

1944 novel by Melba Marlett

- Author: Melba Marlett
- Language: English
- Genre: Mystery novel, Gothic novel
- Publisher: Doubleday
- Publication date: 1944
- Publication place: United States
- Media type: Print (hardcover)
- Pages: 192

Escape While I Can is a 1944 mystery novel by Melba Marlett. It was reportedly written over the course of two years.

== Plot ==
Elizabeth marries into a strange and wealthy family plagued by mysterious disappearances and unpleasant rumors. She disentangles herself from the marriage, but is drawn back in several years later due to new evidence of murders.

== Publication history ==
Escape While I Can, written by Melba Marlett, was published in December, 1944, by The Crime Club, an imprint of Doubleday. It was reprinted in 1965 by Ace Books as part of its G series (G-568) in 1965. It was reportedly written over the course of two years.

== Reception ==
Escape While I Can received positive reviews, being hailed as Marlett's best work so far by some commentators. It was lauded by The Tennessean as a "swift moving brain taxer...with plenty of character and atmosphere." The Greensboro Daily News said Marlett "carries the story to new heights of suspense." While the reviewer for the Winston-Salem Journal and Sentinel found it "no better than her three previous books," it was still "above par."

A particularly high-profile enforcement was provided by Dorothy B. Hughes, who called Escape While I Can "well written and strongly recommended for those who wait two long between Eberharts."
