= Jesse Kornbluth =

American writer (1946–2025)

Jesse Kornbluth

Jesse Kornbluth (January 4, 1946 – April 3, 2025) was an American magazine writer and author. His book Notes from the New Underground is an anthology of articles he compiled from counterculture newspapers. He also wrote Airborne, a biography of Michael Jordan, and Highly Confident: The Crime and Punishment of Michael Milken. His articles appeared in The New York Times Magazine, Vanity Fair, and many other magazines. He was a graduate of Harvard University. Kornbluth died on April 3, 2025, at the age of 79.
