= Strange Happenings: Weird Tales of Science Fiction and the Supernatural =

1972 book

Strange Happenings - Weird Tales of Science Fiction And the Supernatural
- Author: Robert Vitarelli (editor)
- Illustrator: Ben F. Stahl
- Genre: children's book
- Publisher: American Education Publications
- Publication date: 1972
- Media type: Print ()

Strange Happenings: Weird Tales of Science Fiction And the Supernatural is a children's book, containing nine short stories compiled and edited by Robert Vitarelli, with illustrations by Ben F. Stahl.

The book was published by American Education Publications (owned by the Xerox corporation) in 1972.

== Synopsis ==
The stories and brief synopses in the book are as follows:

1. Haunted Flight by George Frangoulis - A boy, Nick, wakes up to find he is alone in the world; after searching in vain, it is revealed that he is in fact dead.
2. Some Pencils are Smarter than People by Erwin A. Steinkamp - A young man purchases a pencil from a street vendor, and discovers, to his delight, that when he takes tests with the pencil, it always writes down the correct answers.
3. The New Friend by D.J. Gregoirio - A young man discovers his classmate is an Extraterrestrial.
4. The Mysterious Rescue at Sea - Author Unknown - A ship becomes stuck to an iceberg, and is only found by another ship due to a case of Astral Projection.
5. Space Mission 21 by E.M. Deloff - Astronauts land on a strange planet with an odd, glowing, golden orb in the sky, and inhabited by beings with only two arms which ride in vehicles with the words D-U-N-E B-U-G-G-Y on the side.
6. The Case of the Strange TV Channel by Jaqueline W. Mcmann - A young man, watching a television broadcast with his family of the first unmanned probe to land on Pluto, ends up having his consciousness transmitted to the landing site, leaving his body behind in his living room, dead.
7. Be Tough! by Tom Gunning - A young High School Football player, stuck in his burning home after rescuing his family, is inspired to "Be Tough" and keep crawling to safety despite the burning pain by his Football Coach continually shouting it from outside the burning home; it is later revealed that the Coach had died earlier that evening, prior to the fire.
8. The Perfect Place to Live by Tom Gunning - A man, driven to his last nerve by the stress, hustle and bustle of the big city, opts to live on a colonized planet known as Utopia; he later discovers that peace, quiet, and perfect order can be quite boring, and returns to Earth and the big city, far less bothered by and in fact even enjoying the noise and activity.
9. The Joker by Tony Gaignat - A young man assists another boy who jokes about being a Werewolf in training for the track team, only to find that it was no joke, and finds himself face to face with a Werewolf.
