= The Quiet Gentleman =

1951 novel by Georgette Heyer

- First edition
- Author: Georgette Heyer
- Language: English
- Genre: Regency, Romance
- Publisher: William Heinemann
- Publication date: 1951
- Publication place: United Kingdom
- Media type: Print (Hardback & Paperback)
- Pages: 320 pp

The Quiet Gentleman is a Regency novel by Georgette Heyer, published at the start of 1951 by William Heinemann Ltd. Set in the spring of 1816, after the Battle of Waterloo, it is the story of the return home from the wars of the Seventh Earl of St Erth to claim his inheritance. The novel incorporates elements of the mystery story as well as the classic romance.

== Plot ==
Gervase Frant, 7th Earl of St Erth, who became estranged from his father as a young boy, was reared by his maternal grandmother and then spent years serving in the military during the Napoleonic Wars. On his father's death, he returns to his inheritance, the family seat at Stanyon in Lincolnshire. Also residing there are his stepmother, Gervase's younger half-brother Martin, his cousin Theo and his stepmother's young friend, Drusilla Morville, who is on a long-term visit.

Lady St Erth and Martin make it plain that they are disappointed that Gervase has survived the war, as Martin might have inherited instead. Theo, his cousin and acting steward, is therefore the only person at Stanyon with whom he has had much friendly contact. Gervase goes on to get his own way in the household, not by bluster but by quiet insistence.

Out riding one day, Gervase happens upon an attractive young lady who has fallen off her horse and discovers her to be Marianne, the daughter of another member of the local gentry, Sir Thomas Bolderwood. Since he had successfully made his fortune in India, Sir Thomas is known locally as the Nabob. Gervase, being rather taken with Marianne, finds that Lady St Erth is less impressed with his new acquaintance; while she is fond of Marianne, she has hopes of her making a match with Martin.

Returning from his visit with Marianne's parents, Gervase ends up fencing with Martin, who is not at all his match. During the contest, the button on Martin's foil falls off, but he continues to engage, to Gervase's disquiet.

Having made Marianne's acquaintance, Gervase resolves that there should be a ball, an idea which Martin throws himself into with enthusiasm, although it falls to Drusilla to organize it. Prior to the ball, Gervase is awoken one night by what he believes is an intruder in his room and finds there a handkerchief that belongs to Martin. Shortly thereafter, Gervase nearly crosses a damaged bridge.

"Lucy" (short for Lucius), Lord Ulverston, an old army friend of Gervase's who is heir to the earldom of Wrexham, arrives at Stanyon unexpectedly and is invited to stay for the upcoming ball. Martin's sister and her family arrive as well. The ball is a resounding success; particularly successful is the meeting between "Lucy" and Marianne. This upsets Martin, although Gervase receives it with equanimity. Lord Ulverston and Marianne will later become engaged.

After the ball, disquieting events continue. Someone sets up a tripwire for Gervase's horse and he is stunned by the fall. Later someone shoots Gervase and, although the injury is not fatal, he is laid up for some time with an injured shoulder. Immediately after the incident, Martin disappears and it is assumed that he fled to avoid blame for the shooting. When he reappears, it is with a story of being attacked, tied up and abandoned in a sandpit, of which everyone is sceptical except for Gervase.

As soon as he is fairly well recovered, Gervase rides out to see Theo, but he is hotly pursued by Martin. Martin tells Gervase that he believes Theo is behind the attempts to compromise them both, and Gervase agrees that this is what he always suspected. Rather than risk the scandal of a prosecution without proof, Gervase sends Theo to manage Martin's plantation in the West Indies. Now that the half-brothers are reconciled, Gervase suggests that Martin take over the successful running of the estate in Theo's place.

Drusilla, who is the daughter of a republican philosopher and has won over Gervase with her quiet practicality, has shared his suspicions. In her agitation while the male family members are away from home, she trips on the stairs and breaks her arm in the fall. Her parents arrive to take care of her and, when Gervase's feelings become apparent, both his step-mother and Drusilla's father forbid the match. While those two then engage in a dispute over whose family is the most ancient, Gervase and Drusilla come to a satisfactory understanding.

== Characters in "The Quiet Gentleman" ==
Lord Gervase Frant, former Viscount Desborough, estranged son of the 6th earl of St Erth and his first wife, brought up by his maternal grandmother, Lady Penniston

Martin Frant - second son of the 6th earl

Theodore Frant - Gervase and Martin's capable cousin

Dowager Countess St Erth - the 6th earl's second wife

Mr Clowne - the family chaplain

Lady Louisa Grampound - half-sister of St Erth, married to Lord Grampound

Miss Drusilla Morville - a neighbour, staying at Stanyon while her parents visit the Lakes.

Barney Warboys - a friend of Martin

Miss Marianne Bolderwood - daughter of Sir Thomas Bolderwood

Sir Thomas Bolderwood - who has succeeded his brother as Master of Wissenhurst

Lady Bolderwood - Sir Thomas's wife

Chard - Gervase's groom and trusted servant

Turvey - Gervase's valet

Viscount Ulverston - heir to the Earl of Wrexham, ex cavalry captain

Abney - the butler at Stanyon

Leek - a Bow Street Runner, posing as Martin's valet
