= Catseye (novel) =

1961 novel by Andre Norton

- Cover of the first edition, published by Harcourt Brace. Art by Richard M. Powers.
- Author: Andre Norton
- Language: English
- Publication date: 1961

Catseye is a 1961 science fiction novel by American writer Andre Norton. It tells the story of a young man living as a member of the underclass in the "Dipple", a deprived part of a colony on a distant planet, who discovers an ancient secret that changes his life. Catseye is the first of Norton's Dipple series of novels. The other novels in the Dipple series are Judgment on Janus (1963), Night of Masks (1964), and Forerunner Foray (1973). (Note: Both Judgment on Janus and Forerunner Foray are also part of their other, own series'.)

== Plot summary ==
Troy Horan manages to find work in a luxury pet shop on his repressive planet when he learns he can communicate telepathically with the animals – notably a kinkajou and some exotic Terran cats. He uncovers a conspiracy resulting in the death of the owner and flees to the dangerous Wilds with the animals. After crashing in ancient, forbidden ruins, he finds the remains of the explorers that had previously attempted to enter the ruins along with a mysterious machine that can summon the past into the present. The aforementioned machine is heavily implied to have been the cause of the explorer's deaths.
