= List of Ace miscellaneous letter-series single titles =

Ace Books have published hundreds of genre titles, starting in 1952, including a few that did not fit into the standard three genres that Ace focused on -- science fiction, westerns, and mysteries. A few of these were in dos-à-dos format, but many were single volumes. Between 1953 and 1968, the books had a letter-series identifier; after that date they were given five digit numeric serial numbers. There were a total of 581 singles letter-series titles not in any of the other three genres, and these are listed below.

The list given here gives a date of publication; in all cases this refers to the date of publication by Ace, and not the date of original publication of the novels. For more information about the history of these titles, see Ace Books, which includes a discussion of the serial numbering conventions used and an explanation of the letter-code system.

== D, G and S Series ==
- D-032 NA Dorothy Malone Cookbook For Beginners (1953)
- D-043 NA George S. Viereck and Paul Eldridge Salome: My First 2000 Years Of Love (1953)
- S-054 NA Carl Offord The Naked Fear (1954)
- S-058 NA Joachim Joesten Vice, Inc. (1954)
- D-062 NA Ken Murray Ken Murray's Giant Joke Book (1954)
- D-065 NA Juanita Osborne Tornado Edward Kimbrough Night Fire (1954)
- S-067 NA Robert Bloch The Will to Kill (1954)
- S-070 NA Rae Loomis Luisita (1954)
- S-074 NA Virginia M. Harrison (as Wilene Shaw) Heat Lightning (1954)
- S-075 NA Ralph E. Shikes (ed.) Cartoon Annual (1954)
- S-076 NA Émile Zola Shame
- S-080 NA Wilene Shaw The Fear and the Guilt
- S-085 NA Ernst-Maurice Tessier (as Maurice Dekobra) The Bachelor's Widow (1954)
- S-087 NA Noland Miller Why I Am So Beat (1955)
- D-088 NA Dexter Davis (author) 7-Day System for Gaining Self-Confidence (1955)
- S-091 NA Stanley Baron End of the Line (1955)
- S-093 NA H. T. Elmo Modern Casanova's Handbook (1955)
- S-095 NA Harry Whittington The Naked Jungle (1955)
- S-100 NA Henry Lewis Nixon The Caves (1955)
- S-102 NA George Albert Glay Oath of Seven (1955)
- S-104 NA R. V. Cassill and Eric Protter Left Bank Of Desire (1955)
- S-105 NA Edward De Roo The Fires of Youth (1955)
- S-107 NA C. P. Hewitt (as Peter Twist) The Gilded Hideaway (1955)
- S-108 NA Leslie Waller (as C.S. Cody) Lie Like a Lady (1955)
- S-111 NA Harry Harrison Kroll The Smoldering Fire (1955)
- S-114 NA Edward Adler Living It Up (1955)
- S-116 NA Brant House Words Fail Me (1955)
- S-117 NA Kim Darien Dark Rapture (1955)
- S-119 NA Lawrence Easton The Driven Flesh (1955)
- S-122 NA Ledru Baker Jr. The Preying Streets (1955)
- S-124 NA Rae Loomis House of Deceit (1955)
- S-126 NA A. H. Berzen Washington Bachelor (1955)
- D-127 NA Robert Payne Alexander And The Camp Follower (1955)
- S-130 NA Sidney Weissman Backlash (1955)
- D-131 NA Eugene Wyble The Ripening
- S-132 NA Brant House (ed.) Cartoon Annual #2 (1955)
- S-136 NA R. V. Cassill A Taste of Sin
- S-137 NA Ralph Jackson Violent Night (1955)
- S-140 NA H. T. Elmo Honeymoon Humor (1956)
- S-141 NA Oliver Crawford Blood on the Branches (1956)
- S-142 NA Glenn M. Barns Masquerade in Blue (1956)
- S-143 NA Harry Whittington A Woman On The Place (1956)
- S-145 NA Brant House (ed.) Little Monsters (1956)
- S-151 NA Robert Novak Climb a Broken Ladder (1956)
- S-152 NA Henry Felsen Medic Mirth (1956)
- S-153 NA Hallam Whitney The Wild Seed (1956)
- D-154 NA Sloan Wilson Voyage to Somewhere (1956)
- S-158 NA Kim Darien Golden Girl (1956)
- S-159 NA Jack Webb (as John Farr) She Shark (1956)
- S-161 NA E. Davis Gag Writer's Private Joke Book (1956)
- D-163 NA Russell Boltar Woman's Doctor (1956)
- S-165 NA Brant House (ed.) Love and Hisses (1956)
- S-171 NA Eddie Davis (ed.) Campus Joke Book (1956)
- S-174 NA Robert Novak B-Girl (1956)
- D-175 NA Irving Settel (ed.) Best Television Humor of the Year (1956)
- D-178 NA Jean Paradise The Savage City (1956)
- S-179 NA Brant House (ed.) Squelches (1956)
- D-181 NA Arthur Conan Doyle and John Dickson Carr The Exploits of Sherlock Holmes (1956)
- D-184 NA J. Mccague The Big Ivy (1956)
- S-188 NA Brant House (ed.) They Goofed! (1956)
- S-190 NA Henry Lewis Nixon The Golden Couch (1956)
- D-191 NA Frank Slaughter Apalachee Gold (1956)
- D-194 NA Theodor Plievier Moscow (1956)
- S-198 NA William Bender Jr. Tokyo Intrigue (1957)
- D-200 NA Edward J. Ruppelt Unidentified Flying Objects (1956)
- D-202 NA Leonard Kauffman The Color of Green (1957)
- D-207 NA Charles Grayson Hollywood Doctor
- D-210 NA Stephen Longstreet The Lion at Morning (1957)
- D-212 NA H. T. Elmo Hollywood Humor (1957)
- D-213 NA Peter J. Steincrohn How to Stop Killing Yourself (1957)
- D-214 NA Martin L. Weiss Hate Alley
- D-218 NA Sasha Siemel Tigrero!
- S-219 NA P. A. Hoover Backwater Woman (1957)
- D-222 NA R. Frison-Roche First on the Rope (1957)
- D-224 NA Shelby Steger Desire in the Ozarks (1957)
- D-228 NA David Howarth We Die Alone (1957)
- D-229 NA Walter Whitney Take It Out In Trade (1957)
- D-232 NA Willard Manies The Fixers (1957)
- D-234 NA Robert L. Scott Look of the Eagle (1957)
- D-238 NA Clellon Holmes Go (1957)
- D-239 NA G. Harry Stine Earth Satellite and the Race for Space Superiority (1957)
- D-243 NA Michael Wells The Roving Eye (1957)
- D-244 NA Terence Robinson Night Raider of the Atlantic: The Saga of the U-99 (1957)
- D-246 NA John Harriman The Magnate (1957)
- D-250 NA Arthur Steuer The Terrible Swift Sword (1957)
- D-251 NA Hamilton Cochran Windward Passage (1957)
- D-254 NA Marcos Spinelli The Lash of Desire (1957)
- S-256 NA Karl Ludwig Oritz The General (1957)
- D-257 NA Louis Malley Tiger in the Streets (1957)
- D-258 NA Sławomir Rawicz The Long Walk (1957)
- S-262 NA Leland Jamieson Attack! (1957)
- S-263 NA Virginia M. Harrison (as Wilene Shaw) See How They Run (1957)
- D-267 NA Jim Bosworth Speed Demon (1958)
- D-268 NA Brant House (ed.) Lincoln's Wit, Humorous Tales And Anecdotes By And About Our 16th President (1958)
- D-269 NA Michael Powell Death in the South Atlantic
- D-270 NA Bud Clifton D For Delinquent
- D-271 NA Cliff Howe Lovers And Libertines (1958)
- S-275 NA Brant House (ed.) Cartoon Annual #3- The Cream of the Year's Best Cartoons (1958)
- D-278 NA Donald Barr Chidsey This Bright Sword (1957)
- D-280 NA James P. S. Devereux The Story Of Wake Island
- D-281 NA Norman Vincent Peale (ed.) Guideposts (1958)
- D-282 NA Cliff Howe Scoundrels, Fiends, and Human Monsters (1958)
- D-287 NA Holland M. Smith Coral And Brass (1958)
- D-290 NA P. A. Hoover A Woman Called Trouble (1958)
- D-292 NA Booth Mooney The Insiders (1958)
- D-293 NA Väinö Linna The Unknown Soldier (1954)
- D-296 NA John Clagett Run The River Gauntlet (1958)
- D-300 NA J. Walter Small The Dance Merchants (1958)
- D-302 NA Maurice Druon The Iron King (1956)
- D-306 NA Peyson Antholz All Shook Up (1958)
- D-307 NA Brant House (ed.) From Eve On: Wit And Wisdom About Women (1958)
- D-310 NA Marcos Spinelli Mocambu (1958)
- D-312 NA Harlan Ellison The Deadly Streets (1958)
- D-314 NA Blair Ashton Deeds Of Darkness (1958)
- D-318 NA Donald Barr Chidsey Captain Crossbones (1958)
- D-319 NA Hans-Otto Meissner The Man With Three Faces (1958)
- D-323 NA Brant House The Violent Ones (1958)
- D-325 NA Irving Werstein July 1863 (1958)
- D-326 NA Wilhelm Johnen Battling The Bombers
- D-330 NA Bud Clifton Muscle Boy (1958)
- D-334 NA Stanley Johnston Queen of the Flat-Tops (1958)
- D-336 NA Samuel A. Krasney Morals Squad
- D-337 NA Jack Gerstine Play It Cool
- D-338 NA Edward De Roo The Fires Of Youth
- D-341 NA Rae Loomis The Marina Street Girls (1959)
- D-342 NA Nicholas Gorham Queen's Blade (1959)
- D-343 NA Edward de Roo The Young Wolves (1959)
- D-344 NA Gordon Landsborough Desert Fury (1959)
- G-352 NA Francis Leary Fire And Morning (1959)
- D-353 NA Donald A. Wollheim (ed.) The Macabre Reader
- D-355 NA Bill Strutton and Michael Pearson The Beachhead Spies (1958)
- D-359 NA John Croydon (as John Cooper) The Haunted Strangler (1959)
- D-363 NA Samuel A. Krasney The Rapist (1959)
- D-364 NA Donald Barr Chidsey The Pipes Are Calling (1959)
- D-365 NA Robert Eunson MIG Alley (1959)
- D-370 NA Paul Ernst (as Ernest Jason Fredericks) Cry Flood (1959)
- G-371 NA Theodor Plievier Berlin (1959)
- D-374 NA Burgess Leonard The Thoroughbred And The Tramp (1959)
- G-376 NA J. Harvey Howells The Big Company Look (1959)
- D-378 NA Virginia M. Harrison (as Wilene Shaw) Out For Kicks
- G-382 NA C. T. Ritchie Willing Maid
- D-383 NA David Stacton (as Bud Clifton) The Murder Specialist (1959)
- G-386 NA Richard O'Connor The Sulu Sword (1959)
- D-389 NA Cyril Henry Coles and Adelaide Manning (jointly as Manning Cole) No Entry (1959)
- G-390 NA R. Foreman Long Pig
- D-394 NA Donald Barr Chidsey The Flaming Island (1959)
- D-396 NA Rae Loomis Luisita
- D-398 NA Noland Miller Why Am I So Beat
- D-399 NA Edward Adler Living It Up (1955)
- G-402 NA Daniel P. Mannix Kiboko (1959)
- D-404 NA Clifford Anderson The Hollow Hero (1959)
- D-406 NA Edward Deroo Go, Man, Go! (1959)
- D-410 NA Donald Barr Chidsey Buccaneer's Blade (1959)
- D-414 NA Alexandre Dumas The Companions of Jehu (1960)
- D-416 NA John Kenneth The Big Question (1960)
- D-417 NA Edward de Roo Rumble at the Housing Project (1960)
- D-420 NA John A. Williams The Angry Ones (1960)
- D-423 NA Browning Norton Tidal Wave (1960)
- D-426 NA Robert S. Close Penal Colony
- D-428 NA P. A. Hoover Scowtown Woman
- D-429 NA Charles Runyon The Anatomy Of Violence (1960)
- D-432 NA Donn Broward Convention Queen (1960)
- D-434 NA Jules Verne The Purchase of the North Pole (1960)
- D-435 NA C. T. Ritchie Lady In Bondage (1960)
- D-438 NA Charles Fogg The Panic Button (1960)
- G-440 NA Andrew Hepburn Letter Of Marque (1960)
- D-441 NA Lloyd E. Olson Skip Bomber (1960)
- D-444 NA Shepard Rifkin Desire Island (1960)
- D-446 NA Edward Moore Flight 685 Is Overdue (1960)
- D-452 NA Joe L. Hensley The Colour of Hate (1960)
- G-454 NA Anne Powers Ride East! Ride West! (1960)
- D-458 NA Harry Wilcox (as Mark Derby) Womanhunt (1960)
- D-460 NA James Macgregor When The Ship Sank (1960)
- D-464 NA Virginia M. Harrison (as Wilene Shaw) Tame The Wild Flesh (1960)
- D-467 NA William C. Anderson Five, Four, Three, Two, One-Pfftt Or 12,000 Men And One Bikini (1960)
- D-472 NA Harry Whittington A Night For Screaming
- D-474 NA Leland Lovelace Lost Mines & Hidden Treasure
- D-481 NA Joseph F. Dinneen The Biggest Holdup (1960)
- D-486 NA Edward De Roo The Little Caesars
- D-487 NA Leonard Sanders Four-Year Hitch
- D-488 NA Dan Brennan Third Time Down (1961)
- D-493 NA Ellery Queen (ed.) The Queen's Awards, Fifth Series
- D-495 NA Samuel A. Krasney A Mania For Blondes (1961)
- D-501 NA David Stacton (as Bud Clifton) Let Him Go Hang (1961)
- D-503 NA Frances Nichols Hanna (as Fan Nichols) The Girl in the Death Seat (1961)
- D-506 NA Harry Harrison Kroll The Brazen Dream (1961)
- D-508 NA Donald A. Wollheim (ed.) More Macabre (1961)
- D-512 NA Donald Barr Chidsey Marooned (1961)
- D-513 NA Harlan Ellison The Juvies
- D-518 NA Bill Miller and Robert Wade (as Wade Miller) Nightmare Cruise (1961)
- D-519 NA Carroll V. Glines and Wendell F. Moseley Air Rescue! (1961)
- D-520 NA Virginia M. Harrison (as Wilene Shaw) One Foot In Hell (1961)
- D-521 NA Margaret Howe The Girl in the White Cap (1961)
- D-522 NA Hal Ellson A Nest Of Fear (1961)
- D-523 NA John Jakes (as Jay Scotland) Strike The Black Flag (1961)
- D-524 NA Maysie Greig (as Jennifer Ames) Overseas Nurse (1961)
- D-526 NA Kim Darien Obsession (1961)
- D-529 NA Leslie Turner White The Pirate And The Lady (1961)
- D-532 NA Isabel Capeto (as Isabel Cabot) Nurse Craig (1961)
- D-533 NA H. T. Elmo Mad. Ave. (1961)
- D-536 NA Peggy Gaddis The Nurse And The Pirate (1961)
- D-539 NA Mary Mann Fletcher Psychiatric Nurse (1962)
- D-540 NA Arlene Hale School Nurse (1962)
- D-543 NA Harriet Kathryn Myers Small Town Nurse (1962)
- D-545 NA Suzanne Roberts Emergency Nurse (1962)
- D-548 NA Dudley Dean Mcgaughty (as Dean Owen) End of the World (1962)
- D-549 NA Tracy Adams Spotlight On Nurse Thorne (1962)
- D-552 NA Patricia Libby Hollywood Nurse
- D-553 NA William Hope Hodgson The House On The Borderland (1962)
- D-554 NA Jean Francis Webb (as Ethel Hamill) Runaway Nurse (1962)
- D-556 NA Ruth Macleod A Nurse For Dr. Sterling (1962)
- D-557 NA Florence Stuart Hope Wears White (1962)
- D-558 NA Suzanne Roberts Campus Nurse (1962)
- D-559 NA Jane L. Sears Ski Resort Nurse (1962)
- D-560 NA Robert H. Boyer Medic In Love (1962)
- D-561 NA Ann Rush Nell Shannon R. N. (1963)
- D-562 NA Patricia Libby Cover Girl Nurse (1963)
- D-563 NA Arlene Hale Leave It To Nurse Kathy (1963)
- D-564 NA Harriet Kathryn Myers Prodigal Nurse
- D-565 NA Ray Dorlen The Heart Of Dr. Hilary (1963)
- D-566 NA Suzanne Roberts Julie Jones, Cape Canaveral Nurse (1963)
- D-567 NA Isabel Moore A Challenge For Nurse Melanie (1963)
- D-569 NA Arlene Hale Dude Ranch Nurse (1963)
- D-571 NA Katherine Mccomb Princess Of White Starch (1963)
- D-575 NA Peggy Dern A Nurse Called Hope (1963)
- D-576 NA Dorothy Karns Dowdell Border Nurse (1963)
- D-577 NA Sarah Frances Moore Legacy Of Love (1963)
- D-579 NA Suzanne Roberts Hootenanny Nurse (1964)
- D-580 NA Arlene Hale Symptoms Of Love (1964)
- D-581 NA Suzanne Roberts Co-Ed In White (1964)
- D-582 NA Joan Sargent My Love An Altar (1964)
- D-583 NA Tracy Adams Hotel Nurse (1964)
- D-584 NA Monica Edwards Airport Nurse (1964)
- D-585 NA Arlene Hale Nurse Marcie's Island (1964)
- D-586 NA Barbara Grabendike San Francisco Nurse
- D-587 NA Arlene Hale Nurse Connor Comes Home (1964)
- D-589 NA Virginia B. Mcdonnell The Nurse With The Silver Skates (1964)
- D-591 NA Monica Heath (as Arlene J. Fitzgerald) Northwest Nurse (1964)
- D-593 NA Suzanne Roberts Sisters In White (1965)
- D-595 NA Ruth Macleod Nurse Ann In Surgery (1965)
- D-596 NA Arlene Hale Nurses On The Run (1965)
- D-598 NA Arlene Hale Disaster Area Nurse (1965)
- D-599 NA Patricia Libby Winged Victory For Nurse Kerry (1965)

== F Series ==
- F-118 NA Jacob O. Kamm Making Profits in the Stock Market (1961)
- F-132 NA Mario Cappelli Scramble! (1962)
- F-137 NA R. Dewitt Miller Impossible: Yet It Happened! (1962)
- F-140 NA Leonie St. John Love With A Harvard Accent (1962)
- F-146 NA John Jakes (as Jay Scotland) Sir Scoundrel (1962)
- F-151 NA Nedra Tyre Reformatory Girls (1962)
- F-163 NA Adele De Leeuw Doctor Ellen (1962)
- F-175 NA Evelyn Berckman Lament For Four Brides (1962)
- F-198 NA Simenon The Short Cases Of Inspector Maigret
- F-202 NA Evelyn Berckman The Hovering Darkness (1963)
- F-218 NA Allen Churchill They Never Came Back (1960)
- F-219 NA Henry Makow Ask Henry (1963)
- F-278 NA Frances Spatz Leighton Patty Goes To Washington (1964)
- F-288 NA Hal Sherman Fishing For Laughs
- F-331 NA Gahan Wilson Graveside Manner (1965)
- F-339 NA Arlene Hale Private Duty for Nurse Scott (1965)
- F-341 NA Suzanne Roberts A Prize For Nurse Darci (1965)
- F-349 NA Suzanne Roberts Celebrity Suite Nurse (1965)
- F-352 NA Arlene Hale Nurse On Leave (1965)
- F-359 NA Sharon Heath Jungle Nurse (1965)
- F-362 NA Suzanne Roberts The Two Dr. Barlowes (1965)
- F-368 NA Arlene Hale Chicago Nurse (1965)
- F-369 NA Samuel A. Peeples (as Samuel Anthony Peeples) The Lobo Horseman (1965)
- F-371 NA Arlene Hale Camp Nurse (1965)
- F-378 NA Mary Mann Fletcher Danger - Nurse At Work (1966)
- F-381 NA Sharon Heath Nurse At Shadow Manor (1966)
- F-384 NA L. P. Holmes The Savage Hours (1966)
- F-385 NA Arlene Hale Emergency For Nurse Selena (1966)
- F-387 NA Arlene Hale Mountain Nurse (1966)
- F-394 NA Gail Everett Journey For A Nurse (1966)
- F-397 NA Willo Davis Roberts Nurse Kay's Conquest (1966)
- F-405 NA Suzanne Roberts Vietnam Nurse (1966)
- F-410 NA Arlene Hale Lake Resort Nurse (1966)
- F-413 NA Sharon Heath A Vacation For Nurse Dean (1966)
- F-417 NA Willo Davis Roberts Once A Nurse (1966)
- F-419 NA Suzanne Roberts Rangeland Nurse (1967)
- F-424 NA Arlene Hale Community Nurse (1967)
- F-430 NA Arlene Hale Nurse On The Beach (1967)

== M Series ==
- M-145 NA Elizabeth Kellier The Patient at Tonesburry Manor (1966)
- M-146 NA anonymous (ed.) Cracked Again (1966)
- M-159 NA Sylvia Lloyd Down East Nurse (1965)
- M-161 NA Sharon Heath Nurse at Moorcroft Manor (1965)
- M-163 NA Ray Hogan Wolver
- M-164 NA Suzanne Roberts Cross Country Nurse

== G Series ==
There had previously been nine titles with a G prefix published as part of the D//G/S-series. These nine are:

- G-352 NA Francis Leary Fire And Morning (1959)
- G-371 NA Theodor Plievier Berlin (1959)
- G-376 NA J. Harvey Howells The Big Company Look (1959)
- G-382 NA C. T. Ritchie Willing Maid
- G-390 NA R. Foreman Long Pig
- G-440 NA Andrew Hepburn Letter Of Marque (1960)
- G-454 NA Anne Powers Ride East! Ride West! (1960)

The nine titles above are also listed in the D/G/S-series, but are separated here for convenience.

The remaining titles come from the second G series.

- G-504 NA Theodor Plievier Moscow (1965)
- G-505 NA Ken Murray Ken Murray's Giant Joke Book
- G-507 NA John M. Foster Hell in the Heavens
- G-515 NA Sławomir Rawicz The Long Walk
- G-520 NA John Jakes (as Jay Scotland) Arena
- G-522 NA Frederick Faust (as George Challis) The Firebrand
- G-527 NA Frederick Faust (as George Challis) The Bait And The Trap (1965)
- G-532 NA John Jakes (as Jay Scotland) Traitors’ Legion (1963)
- G-536 NA Helen Reilly The Day She Died
- G-537 NA Edward J. Ruppelt Unidentified Flying Objects (1965)
- G-538 NA Andre Norton Shadow Hawk (1965)
- G-541 NA Jean Potts The Evil Wish
- G-542 NA Heidi Huberta Freybe Loewengard (as Martha Albrand) Meet Me Tonight (1965)
- G-544 NA Ruth Fenisong The Wench Is Dead (1964)
- G-545 NA Dana Lyon The Trusting Victim (1965)
- G-550 NA Theodora DuBois The Listener (1965)
- G-552 NA Theodora DuBois Shannon Terror (1965)
- G-553 NA Michael Avallone The Man From U.N.C.L.E.
- G-554 NA Genevieve Holden The Velvet Target
- G-556 NA Leonie St. John Love With a Harvard Accent (1963)
- G-558 NA Genevieve Holden Something's Happened To Kate
- G-559 NA Heidi Huberta Freybe Loewengard (as Martha Albrand) After Midnight (1965)
- G-560 NA Harry Whittington The Doomsday Affair (1965)
- G-562 NA Helen McCloy The Long Body (1965)
- G-563 NA Heidi Huberta Freybe Loewengard (as Martha Albrand) A Day In Monte Carlo (1965)
- G-564 NA John Oram Thomas (as John Oram) The Copenhagen Affair (1965)
- G-566 NA Irene Maude Swatridge and Charles John Swatridge (jointly as Theresa Charles) Lady in the Mist (1965)
- G-567 NA Theresa Charles The Shrouded Tower (1965)
- G-568 NA Melba Marlett Escape While I Can (1965)
- G-569 NA David Howarth We Die Alone (1965)
- G-571 NA David McDaniel The Dagger Affair (1965)
- G-572 NA Joy Packer The Man in the Mews (1966)
- G-575 NA Margaret Summerton Quin's Hide (1966)
- G-578 NA Dorothy Eden (as Mary Paradise) Shadow of a Witch (1966)
- G-581 NA John T. Phillifent The Mad Scientist Affair (1966)
- G-583 NA Marie Garratt Festival Of Darkness (1966)
- G-589 NA Margaret Summerton Ring Of Mischief (1966)
- G-590 NA David McDaniel The Vampire Affair (1966)
- G-593 NA Dorothy Eden (as Mary Paradise) Face of an Angel (1966)
- G-594 NA Charles Runyon The Bloody Jungle (1966)
- G-598 NA Barbara James Bright Deadly Summer (1966)
- G-600 NA Peter Leslie The Radioactive Camel Affair (1966)
- G-603 NA Carolyn Wilson The Scent of Lilacs (1966)
- G-604 NA Jess Shelton Daktari (1966)
- G-608 NA Jean Potts The Only Good Secretary (1967)
- G-612 NA Leal Hayes Harlequin House (1967)
- G-613 NA David McDaniel The Monster Wheel Affair (1967)
- G-616 NA Marion Zimmer Bradley Souvenir Of Monique (1967)
- G-617 NA Peter Leslie The Diving Dames Affair (1967)
- G-621 NA Elizabeth Kelly (as Elizabeth Kellier) Matravers Hall (1967)
- G-624 NA Velma Tate (as Francine Davenport) The Secret of the Bayou (1967)
- G-629 NA Elizabeth Kelly (as Elizabeth Kellier) Nurse Missing (1967)
- G-635 NA Lena Brooke Mcnamara Pilgrim's End (1967)
- G-636 NA Joan C. Holly (as J. Holly Hunter) The Assassination Affair (1967)
- G-643 NA Jean Vicary Saverstall (1967)
- G-645 NA Gene DeWeese and Robert Coulson (jointly as Thomas Stratton) The Invisibility Affair (1967)
- G-651 NA Elizabeth Salter Once Upon A Tombstone (1967)
- G-652 NA Michael Bonner The Disturbing Death of Jenkin Delaney (1967)
- G-653 NA Arlene Hale Doctor's Daughter (1967)
- G-658 NA Rona Shambrook (as Rona Randall) Leap in the Dark (1967)
- G-662 NA Agnes Mary Robertson Dunlop (as Elisabeth Kyle) The Second Mally Lee (1967)
- G-663 NA Gene DeWeese and Robert Coulson (jointly as Thomas Stratton) The Mind-Twisters Affair (1967)
- G-666 NA Elizabeth Kelly (as Elizabeth Kellier) Wayneston Hospital (1967)
- G-670 NA David McDaniel The Rainbow Affair (1967)
- G-672 NA Arlene Hale University Nurse (1967)
- G-676 NA John Sawyer and Nancy Buckingham Sawyer (as Nancy Buckingham) Storm in the Mountains (1967)
- G-679 NA Willo Davis Roberts Nurse At Mystery Villa (1967)
- G-684 NA Barbara James Beauty That Must Die (1968)
- G-686 NA Ray Dorien The Odds Against Nurse Pat (1968)
- G-689 NA Ron Ellik and Fredric Langley (jointly as Fredric Davies) The Cross of Gold Affair (1968)
- G-696 NA Arlene Hale Emergency Call (1968)
- G-699 NA Cornell Woolrich The Bride Wore Black (1968)
- G-700 NA Elizabeth Salter Will To Survive (1968)
- G-702 NA William Johnston Miracle At San Tanco: The Flying Nun (1968)
- G-707 NA T. E. Huff (as Edwina Marlowe) The Master of Phoenix Hall (1968)
- G-711 NA Rona Shambrook (as Rona Randall) Nurse Stacey Comes Aboard (1968)
- G-722 NA Gail Everett My Favorite Nurse (1968)
- G-725 NA William Johnston The Littlest Rebels: The Flying Nun #2 (1968)
- G-729 NA David McDaniel The Utopia Affair (1968)
- G-743 NA Sharon Heath Nurse On Castle Island (1968)
- G-744 NA Eula Atwood Morrison (as Andrea Delmonico) Chateau Chaumand (1968)
- G-749 NA John Sawyer and Nancy Buckingham Sawyer (as Nancy Buckingham) Call Of Glengarron (1968)
- G-750 NA Arlene Hale Dr. Barry's Nurse (1968)
- G-751 NA Mildred Davies The Dark Place (1968)
- G-752 NA Peter Leslie The Splintered Sunglasses Affair (1968)
- G-757 NA Helen Arvonen Remember With Tears (1968)
- G-765 NA Virginia Smiley Nurse Kate's Mercy Flight (1968)

== K Series ==
- K-101 NA Charles Francis Potter The Faith Men Live By
- K-102 NA Richard E. Byrd Alone
- K-103 NA Prudencio de Pereda Fiesta
- K-104 NA W.A. Swanberg Sickles the Incredible
- K-105 NA Alfred Duggan Winter Quarters
- K-106 NA Allen Churchill The Improper Bohemians
- K-108 NA D. Robertson Three Days
- K-109 NA Dalton Trumbo Jonny Got His Gun (1959)
- K-110 NA Kirst The Seventh Day (1959)
- K-111 NA Robert Sproul The Cracked Reader
- K-112 NA Les Savage, Jr. The Royal City
- K-113 NA Eric Duthie Tall Short Stories
- K-114 NA O. A. Bushnell Peril in Paradise
- K-115 NA A. A. Hoehling They Sailed Into Oblivion
- K-116 NA Elliot West Man Running
- K-117 NA Frank Edward Stranger Than Science (1960)
- K-118 NA Alfred Duggan Children of the Wolf (1959)
- K-119 NA Ralph Ginzburg Erotica
- K-120 NA J. Haslip Lucrezia Borgia
- K-121 NA Robert C. Ruark Grenadine Etching - Her Life and Loves
- K-122 NA Kurt Singer (ed.) Spies Who Changed History
- K-123 NA Richard B. Erno The Hunt
- K-124 NA Peter Freuchen Eskimo
- K-125 NA Harold Mehling Scandalous Scamps
- K-126 NA Robert Dahl Breakdown
- K-127 NA George Stewart Fire
- K-128 NA Clellan S. Ford and Frank A. Beach Patterns of Sexual Behavior
- K-129 NA Alfred Duggan Conscience of the King
- K-132 NA Harnett Thomas Kane Spies for the Blue and Gray
- K-133 NA Don Berry Trask: The Coast of Oregon, 1848
- K-134 NA Peter Fleming Operation Sea Lion
- K-136 NA C. D. MacDougall Hoaxes
- K-137 NA George Bluestone The Private World Of Cully Powers
- K-138 NA George R. Stewart Ordeal By Hunger
- K-139 NA Alfred Duggan Three's Company
- K-140 NA Harry R. Litchfield Your Child's Care
- K-141 NA Emil Ludwig Michelangelo and Rembrandt: Selections From Three Titans
- K-142 NA Brant House (ed.) Crimes That Shocked America
- K-143 NA Willa Gibbs The Twelfth Physician
- K-144 NA Frank Edwards Strangest of all (1962)
- K-145 NA Harry F. Tashman The Marriage Bed
- K-146 NA Rowena Farr Seal Morning
- K-147 NA Carl J. Spinatelli Baton Sinister (1959)
- K-148 NA Herbert Asbury The Chicago Underworld
- K-149 NA Talbot Mundy Queen Cleopatra (1962)
- K-150 NA Patricia Robins Lady Chatterley's Daughter (1961)
- K-151 NA Pierce G. Fredericks The Great Adventure
- K-152 NA Brant House (ed.) Great Trials Of Famous Lawyers (1962)
- K-153 NA Rebecca Liswood A Marriage Doctor Speaks Her Mind About Sex
- K-155 NA Thomas R. Henry The Strangest Things in the World
- K-156 NA Charles Fort The Book of the Damned
- K-157 NA E. H. G. Lutz Miracles of Modern Surgery
- K-158 NA Phyllis A. Whitney Thunder Heights
- K-159 NA Theodora DuBois Captive of Rome
- K-160 NA Guy Endore The Werewolf of Paris
- K-161 NA Frederick L. Collins The FBI In Peace And War
- K-162 NA Richard O'Connor Gould's Millions
- K-163 NA Rupert Furneaux Worlds Strangest Mysteries
- K-164 NA Phyllis A. Whitney The Trembling Hills
- K-166 NA Shirley Jackson The Sundial
- K-167 NA Karen Blixen (as Pierre Andrezel) The Angelic Avengers
- K-168 NA R. Dewitt Miller Stranger Than Life
- K-169 NA Scott Sullivan The Shortest Gladdest Years
- K-170 NA John J. Pugh High Carnival
- K-171 NA Dorothy Eden Lady of Mallow
- K-172 NA Peter Bourne The Golden Pagans
- K-173 NA Dorothea Malm To The Castle
- K-174 NA Georgette Heyer The Grand Sophy
- K-175 NA Virginia Coffman Moura (1963)
- K-176 NA Brant House Strange Powers of Unusual People
- K-177 NA Anya Seton My Theodosia
- K-178 NA Phyllis A. Whitney The Quicksilver Pool
- K-179 NA Georgette Heyer Venetia
- K-180 NA Margaret Lynn To See A Stranger
- K-181 NA Margaret Summerton The Sea House
- K-182 NA Doris Webster and Mary A. Hopkins Instant Self-Analysis
- K-183 NA Phyllis Bentley The House of Moreys
- K-184 NA Dorothy Eden Whistle For The Crows
- K-185 NA Shirley Jackson Hangsaman
- K-187 NA Henry Bellamann Victoria Grandolet
- K-188 NA Richard E. Byrd Alone
- K-189 NA Dorothy Cameron Disney The Hangman's Tree
- K-190 NA Jim Egleson and Janet Frank Egleson Parents Without Partners
- K-191 NA Anne Buxton (as Anne Maybury) The Brides Of Bellenmore (1963)
- K-192 NA Sheila Bishop The House With Two Faces
- K-193 NA Franklin S. Klaf and Bernhardt J. Hurwood A Psychiatrist Looks At Erotica
- K-194 NA Margaret Summerton Nightingale At Noon
- K-195 NA Michael Avallone (as Edwina Noone) Dark Cypress
- K-196 NA Joseph Sidney Karnake and Victor Boesen Navy Diver
- K-197 NA Doris Miles Disney Who Rides a Tiger
- K-198 NA Josephine Bell Stranger On A Cliff
- K-199 NA Barbara O'Brien Operators And Things (1958)
- K-200 NA J. L. Whitney The Whisper of Shadows
- K-201 NA Georgette Heyer April Lady (1964)
- K-202 NA William Burroughs Junkie (1964)
- K-203 NA Jan Hillard Morgan's Castle
- K-204 NA Robert Payne Charlie Chapin: The Great God Pan (1964)
- K-205 NA Ruth Willock The Night of the Visitor
- K-206 NA Frank Edwards Strange World
- K-207 NA Lady Eleanor Smith A Dark And Splendid Passion
- K-208 NA Nicole Maxwell The Jungle Search for Nature's Cures
- K-209 NA Aileen Seilaz The Veil of Silence (1965)
- K-210 NA Hans Holzer Ghost Hunter
- K-211 NA Anne Buxton (as Anne Maybury) The Pavilion At Monkshood (1965)
- K-212 NA Sheila Bishop The Durable Fire
- K-213 NA Michael Avallone (as Edwina Noone) Dark Cypress (1965)
- K-215 NA Rohan O'Grady The Master of Montrolfe Hall
- K-216 NA Jan Roffman The Reflection of Evil
- K-217 NA Charles Fort Lo!
- K-218 NA Ross Santee Cowboy
- K-219 NA Joan Aiken The Silence Of Herondale
- K-220 NA Susan Howatch The Dark Shore
- K-221 NA Virginia Coffman The Beckoning
- K-222 NA John Macklin Strange Destinies
- K-223 NA Michael Avallone (as Edwinna Noone) Corridor Of Whispers
- K-224 NA Brant House Strange Powers of Unusual People
- K-225 NA Michael Avallone The Summer of Evil
- K-226 NA Georgette Heyer Sylvester
- K-227 NA Anne Buxton (as Anne Maybury) Green Fire
- K-228 NA Robb Stewart Strange Prophecies That Came True
- K-228 NA Joan Winslow Griffin Towers
- K-229 NA R. DeWitt Miller Impossible: Yet It Happened!
- K-230 NA Dorothy Eden The Pretty Ones
- K-231 NA Lane Peters Promise Him Anything
- K-232 NA Anne Buxton (as Anne Maybury) The House of Fand
- K-233 NA Patricia Robins Lady Chatterley's Daughter
- K-234 NA Virginia Coffman The Devil Vicar
- K-235 NA Georgette Heyer Sprig Muslin
- K-236 NA Dorothy Eden Bridge of Fear
- K-237 NA Robert Tralins Strange Events Beyond Human Understanding
- K-238 NA Anne Buxton (as Anne Maybury) Someone Waiting
- K-239 NA Dorothy Eden The Sleeping Bride
- K-240 NA Susan Howatch The Waiting Sands
- K-241 NA Brad Steiger Strange Guests
- K-242 NA Ruth Comfort Mitchell The Legend of Susan Dane
- K-243 NA Dorothy Eden The Deadly Travellers
- K-244 NA Kurt Singer (ed.) The Gothic Reader
- K-245 NA Marie Garratt Dangerous Enchantment
- K-246 NA Joan Grant Castle Cloud
- K-248 NA Anne Buxton (as Anne Maybury) Whisper in the Dark
- K-249 NA Dorothy Eden The Brooding Lake
- K-250 NA Dr. Webb B. Garrison Strange Bonds Between Animals And Men
- K-251 NA Anne Buxton (as Anne Maybury) Shadow of a Stranger
- K-252 NA Phyllis A. Whitney The Trembling Hills
- K-254 NA Rupert Furneaux The World's Strangest Mysteries
- K-255 NA R. DeWitt Miller Impossible: Yet It Happened!
- K-257 NA Anne Buxton (as Anne Maybury) I Am Gabriella!
- K-258 NA Barbara Blackburn City of Forever
- K-259 NA Michael Harvey Strange Happenings
- K-260 NA Joan Rich and Leslie Rich Dating and Mating By Computer (1966)
- K-261 NA Dorothy Eden Night of the Letter (1967)
- K-262 NA Rona Shambrook (as Rona Randall) Walk Into My Parlor (1966)
- K-263 NA Anne Buxton (as Anne Maybury) The Night My Enemy (1967)
- K-264 NA Jane Blackmore The Dark Between The Stars (1967)
- K-265 NA Georgette Heyer The Reluctant Widow (1967)
- K-266 NA Thomas R. Henry The Strangest Things in the World (1967)
- K-267 NA Dorothy Eden Listen To Danger (1967)
- K-268 NA Brad Steiger Treasure Hunting
- K-269 NA Rona Shambrook (as Rona Randall) Seven Days From Midnight
- K-271 NA Anne Buxton (as Anne Maybury) Falcon's Shadow
- K-272 NA Hans Holzer Yankee Ghosts (1966)
- K-273 NA Rona Shambrook (as Rona Randall) The Willow Herb (1967)
- K-275 NA Dorothy Eden Crow Hollow (1967)
- K-276 NA Bernhardt J. Hurwood Strange Talents (1967)
- K-278 NA Helen Arvonen Circle of Death
- K-279 NA anonymous The Strange And Uncanny
- K-280 NA Susan Howatch Call in the Night (1967)
- K-281 NA Margaret Wetherby Williams (Margaret Erskine) No. 9 Belmont Square (1967)
- K-282 NA Anne Buxton (as Anne Maybury) The Winds of Night
- K-283 NA Nancy Buckingham Cloud Over Malverton (1967)
- K-284 NA Monica Dickens The Room Upstairs
- K-285 NA Rona Shambrook (as Rona Randall) Hotel Deluxe
- K-286 NA Nancy Buckingham The Hour Before Moonrise
- K-287 NA Margaret Wetherby Williams (as Margaret Erskine) Old Mrs. Ommanney is Dead
- K-288 NA Robb Stewart Strange Prophecies That Came True (1967)
- K-289 NA Jane Blackmore Night of the Stranger (1967)
- K-290 NA Jan Roffman Ashes in an Urn (1966)
- K-291 NA Brad Steiger We Have Lived Before (1967)
- K-292 NA John Macklin The Enigma of the Unknown (1967)
- K-293 NA Elizabeth Ford Dangerous Holiday (1967)
- K-294 NA Joan Aiken Beware of the Bouquet (1967)
- K-295 NA Margaret Wetherby Williams (as Margaret Erskine) The Woman At Belguardo (1967)
- K-296 NA Warren Smith Strange Powers of the Mind
- K-297 NA Nancy Buckingham The Dark Summer (1968)
- K-298 NA Rona Shambrook (as Rona Randall) The Silver Cord
- K-299 NA Rae Folly Fear of a Stranger
- K-300 NA Michael Hervey They Walk By Night
- K-301 NA Dorothy Eden The Laughing Ghost
- K-303 NA Jane Blackmore Beware The Night (1967)
- K-304 NA Margaret Wetherby Williams (as Margaret Erskine) The Family At Tannerton (1967)
- K-305 NA John Macklin Strange Encounters (1968)
- K-306 NA Susan Howatch The Shrouded Walls (1968)
- K-307 NA Brad Steiger The Occult World Of John Pendragon (1968)

== A Series ==
- A-1 NA Brigitte von Tessin The Shame and the Glory (1966)
- A-7 NA The editors of Short Story International The World's Best Contemporary Short Stories (1966)
- A-9 NA Todhunter Ballard Gold In California! (1966)
- A-11 NA Harold T. Wilkins Flying Saucers On The Attack (1967)
- A-18 NA Frederick E. Smith A Killing For The Hawks
- A-20 NA Dorothy Malone Cookbook For Beginners (1968)
- A-21 NA Corinne Griffith Eggs I Have Known (1968)
- A-22 NA Jean Mattimore and Clark Mattimore Cooking By The Clock (1968)
- A-23 NA Alberto Moravia The Wayward Wife (1968)
- A-24 NA William A. Bishop Winged Warfare (1967)
- A-26 NA Peter J. Steincrohn How To Get A Good Night's Sleep (1968)
- A-27 NA Jim Harmon The Great Radio Heroes (1968)
- A-28 NA René Fonck Ace of Aces (1968)
- A-130 NA Robert B. Douglas (trans.) The Hundred Stories

== N Series ==
- N-1 NA UPI editors Retrospect 1964: Summaries and Captions From Special U.P.I Dispatches (1965)
- N-2 NA UPI editors Retrospect 1965: U.P.I. Pictorial History of 1964 (1966)
- N-4 NA Isaac Asimov Is Anyone There? (1966)
