= List of Ace miscellaneous numeric-series single titles =

Ace Books have published hundreds of western, mystery and science fiction titles, but have also published many books that do not fall into any of those three genres, including gothic novels, nurse romances, literature, and non-fiction. A small number of these were in Ace Double format, but the majority are single volumes. Between 1952 and 1968, the books had a letter-series identifier; after that date they were given five digit numeric serial numbers, and it is these books that are listed below. The list is probably very incomplete.

The list given here gives a date of publication; in all cases this refers to the date of publication by Ace, and not the date of original publication of the novels. For more information about the history of these titles, see Ace Books, which includes a discussion of the serial numbering conventions used and an explanation of the letter-code system.

== Titles ==
- 00241 NA Jack Luzzatto Ace Crossword Puzzle Book #2 (1969)
- 01625 NA Dick Lupoff and Don Thompson (ed.) All In Color For A Dime (1970)
- 02900 NA John Jakes (as Jay Scotland) Arena
- 02940 NA Rona Randall The Arrogant Duke (1972)
- 04745 NA Edgar Rice Burroughs The Bandit of Hell's Bend
- 04755 NA E. Kelton Barbed Wire
- 05785 NA Shepherd Mead The Big Ball of Wax
- 06505 NA Cornell Woolrich The Black Angel (1965)
- 06715 NA Charles Lefebure The Blood Cults (1969)
- 07080 NA Joyce Keener Border-Line (1979)
- 07921 NA Cornell Woolrich Bride Wore Black
- 09102 NA Nancy Buckingham Call of Glengarron
- 09128 NA Kenneth Von Gunden K-9 Corps
- 10471 NA Sam Bowie Chisum (1970)
- 11222 NA Nancy Buckingham Cloud Over Malverton
- 13681 NA Marie Garratt Dangerous Enchantment
- 14153 NA Cornell Woolrich (as William Irish) Deadline at Dawn
- 14165 NA Jack Vance (as James Holbrook Vance) The Deadly Isles
- 14198 NA John Bickham Decker's Campaign
- 14240 NA Wayne C. Lee Die-Hard
- 14247 NA Edgar Rice Burroughs The Deputy Sheriff of Comanche County (1940)
- 14256 NA Walter Scott Demonology & Witchcraft
- 14258 NA David Rome The Depraved (1968)
- 17810 NA Jan Hoffman A Dying in the Night (1975)
- 19640 NA Eliot Asinof Eight Men Out (1963)
- 22327 NA Hans Holzer ESP and You
- 22680 NA Richard L. Hershatter Fallout for a Spy
- 22742 NA Margaret Erskine The Family at Tammerton
- 24302 NA W. Johnston The Underground Picnic: The Flying Nun #5 (1970)
- 24415 NA John Michell The Flying Saucer Vision (1967)
- 24975 NA Jack Vance (as John Holbrook Vance) The Fox Valley Murders (1968)
- 25165 NA Michael Hervey Fraternity of the Weird (1969)
- 25300 NA Georgette Heyer Friday's Child (1946)
- 28911 NA Edgar Rice Burroughs The Girl from Hollywood
- 28914 NA Michael Avallone The Girls in Television (1974)
- 29350 NA Harlan Ellison The Glass Teat (1970)
- 29741 NA Todhunter Ballard Gold in California (1965)
- 29743 NA Todhunter Ballard Gold in California (1965)
- 29786 NA Peter Bourne The Golden Pagans
- 31725 NA Shirley Jackson Hangsaman
- 31781 NA Leal Hayes Harlequin House
- 31930 NA Jane Blackmore Hawkridge (1976)
- 31940 NA John Swenson Headliners: Kiss: The Greatest Rock Show on Earth! (1978)
- 31941 NA Charley Walters Headliners: Fleetwood Mac (1979)
- 32335 NA William Johnston The Young Rebels: The Hedgerow Incident (1970)
- 32575 NA Charles O. Locke The Hell Bent Kid
- 34250 NA N. Fredrik Hollywood And The Academy Awards (1970)
- 34260 NA Mair Unsworth Home To My Love (1973)
- 34361 NA Nancy Buckingham The Hour Before Moonrise
- 34440 NA Barbara Lane Housewife Hookers (1973)
- 34441 NA Barbara Lane Housewife Hookers, Part II (1974)
- 36300 NA Ron Goulart If Dying Was All (1971)
- 37381 NA P. Agan Is That Who I Think It Is? Volume 1 (1975)
- 37382 NA P. Agan Is That Who I Think It Is? Volume 3 (1976)
- 37421 NA H. G. Wells The Island of Dr Moreau (1977)
- 37598 NA Gil Brewer The Devil in Davos: It Takes a Thief #1 (1969)
- 37599 NA Gil Brewer Mediterranean Caper: It Takes a Thief #2 (1969)
- 37600 NA Gil Brewer Appointment In Cairo: It Takes a Thief #3 (1970)
- 40590 NA Ron Goulart Too Sweet to Die (1972)
- 41550 NA Jerry Bladwin Kept Man (1975)
- 41841 NA William Burroughs Junkie (1964)
- 44512 NA Bernhardt Hurwood Kingdom of the Spiders (1977)
- 48862 NA Charles Fort Lo!
- 51550 NA Adeline McElfresh The Magic of Dr. Farrar (1965)
- 51626 NA Rachel Cosgrove Payes Malverne Hall (1970)
- 51700 NA David McDaniel The Hollow Crown Affair (1969)
- 51701 NA Peter Leslie The Unfair Fare Affair (1968)
- 51702 NA John T. Phillifent The Power Cube Affair
- 51703 NA John T. Phillifent The Corfu Affair (1967)
- 51704 NA Joel Bernard The Thinking Machine Affair (1967)
- 51705 NA John Oram Thomas (as John Oram) The Stone-Cold Dead in the Market Affair
- 51706 NA Peter Leslie The Finger in the Spy Affair (1966)
- 51941 NA Bruce Cassiday The Fire's Center; Marcus Welby #3 (1971)
- 52110 NA Jennifer Sills Massage Parlor (1973)
- 54325 NA Rona Randall Mountain of Fear (1971)
- 54378 NA Virginia Coffman Moura (1963)
- 54380 NA Virginia Coffman Moura (1963)
- 54460 NA Edgar Rice Burrough The Mucker (1974)
- 57975 NA Margaret Summerton Nightingale at Noon
- 58875 NA Jesse Kornbluth Notes from the New Underground (1968)
- 61480 NA The Editors Of Science & Mechanics (compilers) The Official Guide To UFO's (1968)
- 64512 NA Edgar Rice Burroughs The Outlaw of Torn
- 65442 NA Anne Maybury The Pavilion at Monkshood (1973)
- 65873 NA Eliot Asinof People vs. Blutcher (1971)
- 66050 NA Cornell Woolrich Phantom Lady
- 67110 NA Jack Vance (as John Holbrook Vance) The Pleasant Grove Murder (1967)
- 67131 NA L. L. Foreman Plundering Gun
- 71000 NA Manfred von Richthofen The Red Baron (1969)
- 71001 NA Manfred von Richthofen The Red Baron
- 71076 NA Clifton Adams Reckless Men
- 71816 NA Edgar Rice Burroughs The Return of the Mucker
- 72280 NA Edgar Rice Burroughs The Rider (1915)
- 73471 NA Monica Dickens The Room Upstairs
- 75181 NA Jean Vicary Saverstall
- 75617 NA Ray Hogan Showdown on Texas Flat
- 75750 NA Sax Rohmer The Secret Of Holm Peel And Other Strange Stories (1970)
- 75945 NA Ron Goulart The Same Lie Twice (1973)
- 75958 NA Brad Steiger Sex and Satanism (1969)
- 75980 NA Barbara Levins Sexual Power of Marijuana
- 75987 NA Ruth Abbey The Shadow Between (1974)
- 76181 NA Louis L'Amour (as Jim Mayo) Showdown at Yellow Butte
- 76972 NA Dorothy Eden Sleep in the Woods (1967)
- 77051 NA Margaret Erskine Sleep No More
- 77425 NA Betty Deforrest The Shows of Yesterday
- 77471 NA Anne Maybury Someone Waiting (1961)
- 77520 NA Wayne Lee Son of a Gunman
- 77598 NA Kenneth Von Gunden The Sounding Stillness
- 77841 NA S. E. Stevenson Spring Magic
- 77905 NA Jane Blackmore The Square of Many Colours
- 78500 NA Warren Smith Strange & Miraculous Cures (1969)
- 78901 NA Brad Steiger Strange Guests (1966)
- 79001 NA Bernhardt J. Hurwood Strange Talents
- 79805 NA Roy Manning Tangled Trail
- 79970 NA Isobel Lambot A Taste of Murder
- 80661 NA Mildred Davis The Third Half
- 82401 NA Ernest Haycox Trigger Trio
- 85460 NA Harold E. Hartney Up & At 'Em
- 86022 NA Virginia Coffman Vampire of Moura
- 87015 NA Philip Loraine One to Curtis (1967)
- 87070 NA Daoma Winston Walk Around the Square (1975)
- 87101 NA Rona Randall Walk Into My Parlor
- 87370 NA Herman Raucher Watermelon Man
- 87718 NA Harlan Ellison Web of the City (1983)
- 88075 NA Richard Lamparski Whatever Became Of.....? Volume I.
- 88076 NA Richard Lamparski Whatever Became Of.....? Volume II. (1970)
- 88440 NA Nelle McFather Whispering Island
- 88554 NA Dorothy Eden Whistle for the Grows
- 90050 NA Charles Lefebure Witness To Witchcraft (1970)
- 90110 NA Georgette Heyer Venetia (1958)
- 90426 NA Lee Hoffman Gunfight at Laramie
- 90701 NA Robert J. Hogan The Wolver
- 95501 NA Arch Whitehouse The Zeppelin Fighters
