= List of Ace titles in H series =

Ace Books published its H series of books from 1966 to 1968, at a price of 60 cents.

- H-1 NA Theodore R. Kupferman The Family Legal Advisor
- H-2 NA George Ryley Scott Curious Customs of Sex and Marriage
- H-3 NA Louis Paul Dara The Cypriot
- H-4 NA Olive Erkerson My Lord Essex
- H-5 NA John H. Culp Born of the Sun
- H-6 NA Florence A. Seward Gold For The Caesars
- H-7 NA John H. Culp The Restless Land
- H-8 NA Will Creed The Sword of Il Grande
- H-9 NA Theodora DuBois Captive Of Rome (1966)
- H-10 NA Theodor Plievier Berlin (1966)
- H-11 NA Theodor Plievier Moscow (1966)
- H-12 NA Harold T. Wilkins Strange Mysteries of Time and Space (1966)
- H-13 NA Gardner Soule The Mystery Monsters (1966)
- H-14 NA Vincent Gaddis Invisible Horizons (1966)
- H-15 SF Donald A. Wollheim and Terry Carr (eds.) The World's Best Science Fiction 1966
- H-16 NA Hans Holzer Ghosts I've Met (1966)
- H-17 NA Jacques Vallée Anatomy Of A Phenomenon (1966)
- H-18 SF Jeff Sutton H-Bomb Over America (1966)
- H-19 SF Frederik Pohl (ed.) The If Reader Of Science Fiction (1966)
- H-20 SF Kenneth Bulmer The Key to Irunium / Alan Schwartz The Wandering Tellurian (1967)
- H-21 SF Jack Vance The Last Castle / Tony Russell Wayman World Of The Sleeper (1967)
- H-22 SF Tom Purdom Five Against Arlane / Emil Petaja Lord of the Green Planet (1967)
- H-23 NA Georgette Heyer Arabella
- H-24 NA Charles Fort The Book of the Damned
- H-25 NA Jan Tempest House of the Pines
- H-26 SF Avram Davidson (ed.) The Best From Fantasy And Science Fiction, 13th Series (1967)
- H-27 SF Juanita Coulson Crisis on Cheiron / E. C. Tubb The Winds of Gath (1967)
- H-28 NA Jacques and Janine Vallée Flying Saucers: A Challenge to Science
- H-29 SF Walt Richmond and Leigh Richmond The Lost Millennium / A. Bertram Chandler The Road to the Rim (1967)
- H-30 SF Clifford D. Simak City (1967)
- H-31 NA Dorothy Eden Sleep in the Woods
- H-32 NA Hal Ellson Games
- H-33 SF Andre Norton Moon Of Three Rings (1967)
- H-34 SF Mack Reynolds Computer War / E. C. Tubb Death is a Dream (1967)
- H-35 NA Dorothy Eden The Daughters of Ardmore Hall (1967)
- H-36 SF Emil Petaja Tramontane / Michael Moorcock The Wrecks Of Time (1967)
- H-37 NA Charlotte Hunt The Gilded Sarcophagus (1967)
- H-38 SF Fritz Leiber The Swords Of Lankhmar (1968)
- H-39 SF Philip K. Dick Eye in the Sky (1968)
- H-40 SF E. C. Tubb C.O.D. Mars / John Rackham Alien Sea (1968)
- H-41 SF Jules Verne Into The Niger Bend (1968)
- H-42 SF Clifford D. Simak Why Call Them Back From Heaven? (1968)
- H-43 SF Jules Verne The City in the Sahara (1968)
- H-44 NA Georgette Heyer The Quiet Gentleman
- H-45 NA Georgette Heyer Venetia
- H-46 NA Robert L. Scott Look of the Eagle
- H-47 NA Hans Holzer Lively Ghosts Of Ireland
- H-48 SF Ellen Wobig The Youth Monopoly / Lan Wright The Pictures Of Pavanne (1968)
- H-49 SF Jules Verne The Begum's Fortune (1968)
- H-50 NA Janet Caird In A Glass, Darkly (1968)
- H-51 SF John M. Faucette Crown Of Infinity / Emil Petaja The Prism (1968)
- H-52 SF Jules Verne Yesterday And Tomorrow (1968)
- H-53 NA Leslie H. Whitten Progeny of the Adder (1968)
- H-54 SF R. A. Lafferty Past Master (1968)
- H-55 NA Willy Ley For Your Information: On Earth and in the Sky (1968)
- H-56 SF Ernest Hill Pity About Earth / R. A. Lafferty Space Chantey (1968)
- H-57 MY Cornell Woolrich Rendezvous In Black (1968)
- H-58 SF Gertrude Friedberg The Revolving Boy (1968)
- H-59 SF Philip E. High The Time Mercenaries / Louis Trimble Anthropol (1968)
- H-60 SF Jules Verne Carpathian Castle (1968)
- H-61 MY Elizabeth Salter Death In A Mist (1968)
- H-62 SF Wilson Tucker The Lincoln Hunters (1968)
- H-63 NA Miriam Allen Deford The Real Bonnie & Clyde (1968)
- H-64 NA Brinsley Trench Flying Saucer Story
- H-65 SF Mack Reynolds Mercenary From Tomorrow / Kenneth Bulmer The Key to Venudine (1968)
- H-66 NA Cornell Woolrich The Black Path Of Fear (1968)
- H-67 SF Jules Verne The Village in the Treetops (1968)
- H-68 NA Raymond Bayless The Enigma of the Poltergeist (1968)
- H-69 NA Rona Shambrook (as Rona Randall) Knight's Keep (1968)
- H-70 SF Dean R. Koontz Star Quest / Emil Petaja Doom of the Green Planet (1968)
- H-71 NA Lois Dorothea Low (as Dorothy Mackie Low) Isle for a Stranger (1968)
- H-72 SF Joanna Russ Picnic On Paradise (1968)
- H-73 SF Fritz Leiber Swords Against Wizardry (1968)
- H-74 NA Charles Fort New Lands (1968)
- H-75 NA Georgette Heyer Cotillion
- H-76 NA Georgette Heyer April Lady
- H-77 SF Juanita Coulson The Singing Stones / E. C. Tubb Derai (1968)
- H-78 SF Jules Verne The Hunt For The Meteor (1968)
- H-79 SF Bob Shaw The Two-Timers (1968)
- H-80 MY Margaret Summerton (as Jan Roffman) With Murder In Mind (1968)
- H-81 NA John Macklin Passport To The Unknown (1968)
- H-82 NA Jane Blackmore The Other Room
- H-83 NA Bernhardt J. Hurwood Vampires, Werewolves, and Ghouls (1968)
- H-84 SF Andre Norton Sorceress Of The Witch World (1968)
- H-85 SF Philip E. High Invader on My Back / Donald A. Wollheim (as David Grinnell) and Lin Carter Destination: Saturn (1968)
- H-86 SF D. G. Compton Synthajoy (1968)
- H-87 NA Rebecca Liswood A Marriage Doctor Speaks Her Mind About Sex
- H-88 NA Charles Fort Wild Talents
- H-89 NA John Macklin Dimensions Beyond The Unknown
- H-90 SF Fritz Leiber Swords in the Mist (1968)
- H-91 SF Laurence M. Janifer and S.J. Treibich Target: Terra / John Rackham The Proxima Project (1968)
- H-92 SF A. E. van Vogt The Far-Out Worlds Of A. E. Van Vogt (1968)
- H-93 MY Delano Ames The Man in the Tricorn Hat
- H-94 NA John Macklin Dwellers In Darkness (1968)
- H-95 SF Clifford D. Simak So Bright the Vision / Jeff Sutton The Man Who Saw Tomorrow (1968)
- H-96 NA Shirley Jackson The Sundial
- H-97 MY Delano Ames The Man With Three Jaguars
- H-98 NA Charlotte Hunt The Cup Of Thanatos (1958)
- H-99 NA Nostradamus; Robb Stewart (trans.) Prophecies on World Events
- H-100 NA Hans Holzer ESP and You
- H-101 NA Georgette Heyer Sprig Muslin
- H-102 SF Edward E. Smith Subspace Explorers (1968)
- H-103 SF Mack Reynolds Code Duello / John M. Faucette The Age of Ruin (1968)
- H-104 NA Cornell Woolrich The Black Curtain (1968)
- H-105 SF James H. Schmitz The Demon Breed (1968)
- H-106 NA Janet Caird Perturbing Spirit
- H-107 NA Virginia Coffman The Dark Gondola
- H-108 NA John Macklin Challenge To Reality
