= We Are for the Dark =

We Are for the Dark is a quotation from the final act of Shakespeare's Antony and Cleopatra, which was used by various writers as the title for their own works.

- We Are for the Dark (1944) by Dorothy Eden
- We Are for the Dark: Six Ghost Stories (1951) by Elizabeth Jane Howard and Robert Aickman
- We Are For The Dark (1987) by Robert Silverberg
  - We Are for the Dark: The Collected Stories [of Silverberg] Volume 7 (2012)
