= W. Langdon Kihn =

American painter (1898-1957)

Wilfred Langdon Kihn
- Born: September 5, 1898; Brooklyn, New York, U.S.
- Died: December 12, 1957 (aged 59); New London, Connecticut, U.S.
- Education: Art Students League
- Notable work: Portraits of American Indians

Wilfred (or William) Langdon Kihn (September 5, 1898 – December 12, 1957) was a portrait painter and illustrator specializing in portraits of American Indians.

== Life and career ==
He was born in Brooklyn, New York, son of Alfred Charles Kihn and Carrie Lowe (Peck) Kihn. He attended Boys' High School in Brooklyn and was recognized there for his artistic talent.

He married Helen Van Tine Butler in 1920, and lived in Hadlyme and Moodus, Connecticut.

He studied with the Art Students League, 1916–17, and was a pupil of Homer Boss and Winold Reiss.

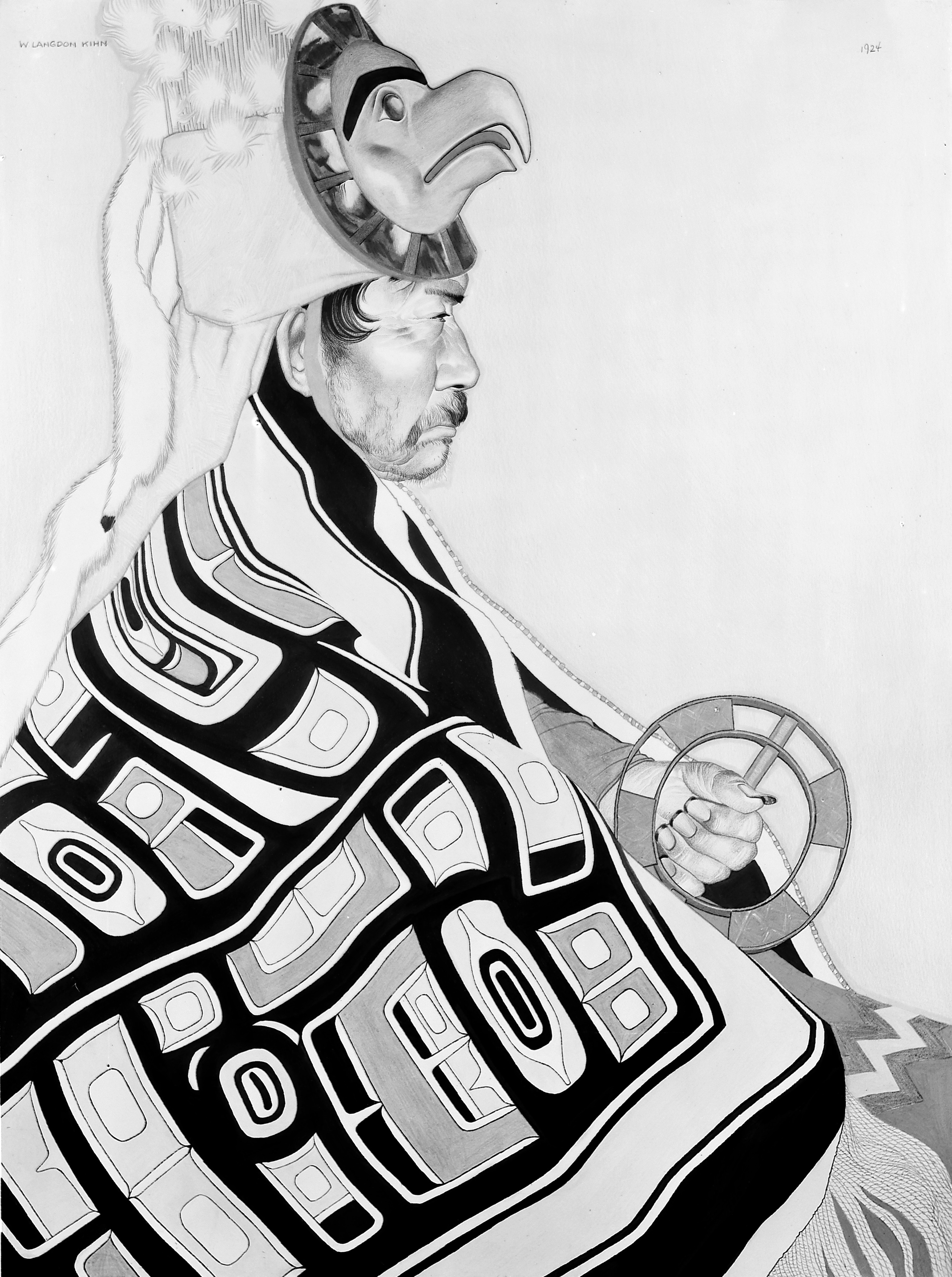
Portrait of Sem-Medeeks of Gitinanga, British Columbia from the Wellcome Collection

Motivated by a desire to document the disappearing aboriginal culture, he spent many years visiting and living with Indian tribes in the Western United States. In 1920, he was admitted to the Blackfeet tribe in Montana, under the name "Zoi-och-ka-tsai-ya," meaning "Chase Enemy in Water".

In 1922, the New York Times described his work as follows:

Mr. Kihn's portraits are marvels of incisive characterization. These closely studied physiognomies show no trace of the sentimental idealization from which most painters of Indian subjects find it almost impossible to escape. Each is firm, clear, and direct, recording the subtle differences of aspect difficult enough to discern in races other than our own, and seizing the essential message of the face with youthful certainty and conviction.

Throughout his career, he also illustrated a number of books, including Indian Days in the Canadian Rockies by Marius Barbeau (1923) and Pocahontas and Her World by Frances Carpenter (1961). Many of his illustrations featured colorful portraits, while children's story books such as Flat Tail by Alice Gall and Fleming Crew (1935) often featured line drawings.

Along with writer Donald Barr Chidsey, he was a Democratic candidate for the Connecticut House of Representatives from the town of Lyme, in the November 2, 1948 election.

He died in Lawrence Memorial Hospital, New London, Connecticut, after a short illness, and was buried in Cove Cemetery, Hadlyme, Connecticut.

== Collections and exhibitions ==
His paintings were featured in one-man and group exhibitions in many different museums and galleries, starting in the early 1920s.

His work is in the permanent collections of, among others, the McCord Museum in Montreal, Quebec, and the Davison Art Collection at Wesleyan University, Middletown, Connecticut.

In 2014, the Foosaner Art Museum at the Florida Institute of Technology hosted an exhibition of his works, featuring pictures from the Vancouver Art Gallery and the National Geographic Society and a private collector.

== See also ==
- Native Americans in the United States: Depictions by Europeans and Americans
- Native Americans in popular culture
- Elbridge Ayer Burbank
- George Catlin
- Seth Eastman
- Paul Kane
- Charles Bird King
- Joseph Henry Sharp
- John Mix Stanley
