= David Derek Stacton =

American novelist

David Derek Stacton (born Arthur Lionel Kingsley Evans, May 27, 1923 – January 19, 1968) was an American novelist, historian and poet.

== Biography ==
Stacton was born in San Francisco. In author profiles, however, he claimed to have been born April 25, 1925, in Minden, Nevada (several of his books are set in Nevada). Stacton attended Stanford University from 1941 to 1943. He served in the Civilian Public Service as a conscientious objector, and wrote a letter as "David Stacton" decrying the compliant American masses to Dwight Macdonald's Politics in 1945. He legally changed his name to David Derek Stacton on September 3, 1946. He changed his name to disassociate himself from his father, and because he believed the surname was unique to him in the United States (as a child he had been known to friends as "Lyonel"). He attended San Francisco State College from 1947 to 1948, and graduated from the University of California, Berkeley in January 1951. He lived in Europe from 1951 to 1954, 1960–1962, and 1964–1965. Most of his books as David Stacton were originally published in England. Stacton wrote under the pseudonyms Carse Boyd, Bud Clifton, David Dereksen and David West. He also ghosted Living Religions Of The World a 1956 work accredited to Frederic Spiegelberg.

Stacton may have lied about being married, and recollections by friends and people who personally met him strongly indicate that he was gay and unafraid of being flamboyant in person. One memoir records Stacton's penchant for drag. The few author descriptions in contemporary reviews were much taken by his wearing of cowboy boots. In 1965-1966 he taught at Washington and Lee College. He died January 19, 1968, in Fredensborg, Denmark. His death was reported as being from a stroke. Stacton had had epilepsy since a child.

== Overview ==
David Stacton's earliest published works were poems, often betraying the influence of T. S. Eliot, which were published in American little magazines. They were collected in 1953. David Stacton began his career as a novelist as a writer of moody California-based novels, became moderately well known as a writer of short, concentrated historical and biographical novels, and then ended his career as a writer of lengthy histories. His historical novels are distinctive for covering many disparate periods and historical figures and were popular with a coterie of critics but they never reached a wide audience. His novels usually focus on a couple of characters who are often highly private, unusual, even perverse individuals, so that his novels are more about encompassing the range of their personalities and motives through introspection rather than through narrative and plot. Stacton frequently refers to life as a "Cosmic Opera House".

He wrote three series of thematically related triptychs. In his first triptych, "The Invincible Questions", Stacton chooses protagonists who are more important for their personal inquiries into the nature of reality than anything that they do, despite being a pharaoh, a king, and monk. His second "American" triptych is highly critical of the development of American history and of America's tendencies to both imperialism and isolationism. And in his third triptych, Stacton examines, with considerable irony, the eternally fraught relationship between archetypal Man and Woman, beginning with Hindu myth, then looking comically at a famous period romance, and concluding with sad events at a film festival in the recent past.

Stacton's novels are often low in dialogue, and sometimes full of his witty scornful comments on his characters and life. Stacton had an epigrammatic style and enjoyed a sophisticated irony, although antipathetic critics took him to task for pretentious vocabulary, a tendency to florid paradoxes, and anachronistic allusions (i.e. describing a 14th-century Zen garden using phrases from Marianne Moore and Peter Pan). In 1963, Time magazine praised his work as "masses of epigrams marinated in a stinging mixture of metaphysics and blood" and suggested that "something similar might have been the result if the Duc de la Rochefoucauld had written novels with plots suggested by Jack London". His other literary influences include Walter Pater, for his choice of characters with frustrated artistic and emotional longings, and Lytton Strachey for his witty attention to history. Several of Stacton's novels feature homosexual characters prominently when this was uncommon.

Besides the novels and other literary works published under his name, he published a wide range of pseudonymous novels of the Cowboy, Thriller and Exploitation genres. His pulp novels about juvenile delinquents written under pseudonyms proved very popular, were translated into numerous languages and D for Delinquent was one of Ace's top sellers for 1958. The Power Gods, about a motorcycle gang, was set in Nevada. Muscle Boy, which features in many histories of gay pulp fiction, was inspired by an actual crime ring based in San Francisco, but Clifton transplanted the action to Muscle Beach and populated it with an assortment of flamboyant party boys and hustlers. The reaction of the real life figures identifiable in the novel was one reason he left the San Francisco area, more or less permanently, in 1959.

== Rediscovery ==
Faber Finds has republished seven of Stacton's novels. (Times Literary Supplement, April 5, 2013).

Fans of David Stacton include John Crowley (Stacton was the inspiration for the character Fellowes Kraft in Crowley's Ægypt sequence), Thomas M. Disch, and Peter Beagle.

== Awards ==
- Guggenheim Fellowship - 1961 and 1966
- National Endowment for the Arts Literature Fellowship - 1968

== Bibliography ==
=== Poetry ===
- An Unfamiliar Country: 25 Poems (Fantasy Press, 1953)
- A Desert Fox, With Cactus-Colored fur (Albert Sperisen, 1960) – broadside poem
- Aetatis Suae LII (Albert Sperisen, 1961) - broadside poem
- Closing In (New Broom Private Press, 1976)
- Five Poems (Limited Editions Unincorporated, 1977)
- If Light in August (The Conspiratorial Impermanent Press, 1984)

=== Biography / history ===
- A Ride on a Tiger: The Curious Travels of Victor Jacquemont (Museum Press, 1954)
- The Crescent and the Cross: The fall of Byzantium May 1453 (G.P. Putnam, 1964) (under name of David Dereksen)
- The World on the Last Day: The Sack of Constantinople by the Turks, May 29, 1453 (Faber, 1965)
- The Bonapartes (Simon & Schuster, 1966)

=== Novels ===
- Dolores (Faber, 1954)
- A Fox Inside (Faber, 1955) - a California noir
- The Self-Enchanted (Faber, 1956)
- Remember Me: A Story of Ludwig II of Bavaria (Faber, 1957) - The Invincible Questions Triptych I
- The Power Gods (Eyre & Spottiswoode, 1958) as Bud Clifton
- D is for Delinquent (Ace, 1958) as Bud Clifton
- Muscle Boy (Ace, 1958) as Bud Clifton
- The Bad Girls (Pyramid, 1958) as Bud Clifton
- On a Balcony: A Story of Akhnaton and Nefertiti (Faber, 1958) - The Invincible Questions Triptych II
- Segaki: A Story of Medieval Japan (Faber, 1958) - The Invincible Questions Triptych III
- The Murder Specialist (Ace, 1959) as Bud Clifton
- Road Kids (Transworld, 1960) as Bud Clifton
- A Dancer in Darkness (Faber, 1960) - novel based on John Webster's "The Duchess of Malfi"
- Wish Me Dead (Eyre & Spottiswoode, 1960) as David West
- A Signal Victory: A Story of the Spanish Conquest of Yucatan (Faber, 1960) - American Triptych I
- The Judges of the Secret Court (Faber, 1961) - based on John Wilkes Booth's assassination of President Lincoln; - American Triptych II
- Let Him Go Hang (Ace, 1961) as Bud Clifton
- Tom Fool (Faber, 1962) - based on the career of Wendell Willkie; - American Triptych III
- Navarro (Doubleday, 1962) as Carse Boyd
- Ride the Man Down (John Long, 1962) as Carse Boyd
- Old Acquaintance (Faber, 1962) - The Sexes Triptych III
- Sir William: or a Lesson in Love (Faber and Putnam, 1963) - novel based on Emma Hamilton's affair with Lord Nelson; The Sexes Triptych II
- Kaliyuga: or a Quarrel with the Gods (Faber, 1965) - The Sexes Triptych I
- People of the Book: A Novel of the Thirty Years War (Putnam, 1965)

=== Short stories ===
- "The March of the Gnomes" Prairie Schooner #23, 1949
- "A Dog Named Ego" Arizona Quarterly, 1950
- "Where It Was Sunny", Prairie Schooner, 1950
- "Trip to the Wedding", Decade of Short Stories, Spring 1951
- "The Dinner at Vidocq" New Directions In Prose And Poetry" #13, 1951
- "The Cruel Self" ADAM International Review 1952/1954
- "Florimond", Magpie, October 1952
- "The Metamorphosis of Kenko", Contact, October 1962
- "A Visit to the Master", The Virginia Quarterly Review, Summer 1965
- "An Old Man Crosses The Border", Southwest Review, Vol. 51, No. 1, Winter 1966.
- "Little Brother Nun", The Virginia Quarterly Review, Spring 1967
- "Notes Written in the Self with a Singular Distaste for Writing Anything Down", Transatlantic Review, Spring 1968

== Obituaries and overviews ==
- New York Times, January 24, 1968
- Washington Post, January 25, 1965
- (London) Times, February 21, 1968
- Malcolm Reiss. David Derek Stacton 1923-1968 (University of California, 1968) - 4 page check-list of Stacton's writings compiled by Stacton's agent for a memorial exhibition at the Bancroft Library, University of California in November 1968
- "David Stacton", David R. Slavitt, Hollins Critic, December 2002
- Writers revisited: David Stacton and the judges of the secret court by Crawford Killian

== Research resources ==
- David Stacton Papers at The Bancroft Library, University of California, Berkeley
