= Janet Caird =

Malawi-born British writer

- Born: 24 April 1913; Livingstonia, Malawi
- Died: 20 January 1992 (aged 78); Inverness, Scotland
- Education: Dollar Academy; University of Edinburgh, M.A., 1935; University of Grenoble and the Sorbonne, 1935–36
- Occupations: Writer, teacher, critic
- Organizations: Royal Overseas League; Society of Authors; Society of Antiquaries of Scotland; Inverness Association of University Women
- Spouse: James Bowman Caird (1938)
- Parents: Peter Scott Kirkwood; Janet (Gilmour) Kirkwood

Janet Hinshaw Caird (24 April 1913 – 20 January 1992) was a teacher and a 20th-century writer of Scottish mysteries, poems, and short stories. Daughter of Peter Kirkwood, a missionary, and Janet Kirkwood, she was born in Livingstonia, Malawi, and educated in Scotland. She attended Dollar Academy in Dollar, Clackmannanshire, and the University of Edinburgh, graduating with a Master of Arts in English literature in 1935 before further study at the University of Grenoble and the Sorbonne in 1935–36.

She married James Bowman Caird in 1938, and they had two daughters. She taught English and Latin at Park School for Girls in Glasgow in 1937–38, at Royal High School, Edinburgh in 1940–41, and at Dollar Academy from 1941 to 1943. After several years at home, she returned to teaching at Dollar Academy in the 1950s before moving to Inverness in 1963.

Her novel for children, Angus the Tartan Partan, was published in 1961, followed by five murder mysteries set in Scotland and an historical novel, The Umbrella Maker's Daughter (1980), set in Dollar. Her three books of poetry appeared between 1977 and 1988. Caird also wrote short stories for publication in periodicals and anthologies, and she wrote reviews and critical articles for Cencrastus, Chapman, Scottish Literary Journal, and other publications.

Caird was a member of the Royal Overseas League, the Society of Authors, and the Society of Antiquaries of Scotland, and she was president of the Inverness Association of University Women. Caird died in Inverness in 1992.

== Bibliography ==
=== Mysteries ===
- Murder Reflected (1965) OCLC 12637445; reprinted as In a Glass Darkly (1965) OCLC 429360540
- Perturbing Spirit (1966) OCLC 11323852
- Murder Scholastic (1967) OCLC 557904857
- The Loch (1968) OCLC 14327
- Murder Remote (1973) OCLC 572145; reprinted as The Shrouded Way (1973) OCLC 3666333

=== Poetry ===
- Some Walk a Narrow Path (1977) OCLC 758388937
- A Distant Urn (1983) OCLC 758388578
- John Donne You Were Wrong (1988) OCLC 758458807

=== Juvenile ===
- Angus the Tartan Partan (1961) OCLC 30217428

=== Other ===
- The Umbrella Maker's Daughter (1980) OCLC 6747295
- The Poetry of Violet Jacob and Helen B. Cruickshank, in Parker, Geoff (ed.), Cencrastus No. 19, Winter 1984, pp. 32 – 34, ISSN 0264-0856

Some of Caird's notebooks and manuscripts are held by the National Library of Scotland in Edinburgh. Other notebooks are held by Boston University in the United States.

== Reviews ==
- Hendry, Joy (1984), Distant Urn, a review of A Distant Urn, in Parker, Geoff (ed.), Cencrastus No. 18, Autumn 1984, p. 47, ISSN 0264-0856
