= Margaret Wetherby Williams =

British mystery writer

- Born: 2 May 1901; Kingston, Ontario, Canada
- Died: 9 July 1984 (aged 83); Westminster, London, England
- Education: Privately educated
- Occupation: Mystery writer
- Parent(s): Thomas and Elizabeth (Erskine) Williams
- Writing career
- Pen name: Margaret Erskine

Doris Margaret Wetherby Williams (2 May 1901 – 9 July 1984), who wrote under the pseudonym Margaret Erskine, was a British writer of mysteries. Her more than 20 novels featured the same leading character, Inspector Septimus Finch. Williams was a member of PEN International and the Crime Writers' Association.

== Personal life ==
Born in Kingston, Ontario, Canada, Williams grew up in Devon, England. Her parents were Thomas and Elizabeth (Erskine) Williams. She was privately educated. She died in 1984.

== Critical reception ==
Mary Helen Becker, writing in Twentieth Century Crime and Mystery Writers, says that the Septimus Finch novels often feature large eccentric families, old houses, secret rooms, psychic phenomena, and "familiar puzzles". She rates the novels as "not really in the first rank" but "nevertheless better than many... Horrible things happen, but they are packaged for polite society."

== Bibliography ==
- And Being Dead (1938)
- The Limping Man (1939), also published as The Painted Mask (1972)
- The Voice of the House (1947), also published in England as Whispering House (1947)
- I Knew MacBean (1948)
- Give up the Ghost (1949)
- The Disappearing Bridegroom (1950)
- The Silver Ladies (1951)
- Look behind You, Lady (1952), also published in England as Death of Our Dear One (1952)
- Dead by Now (1953)
- Old Mrs. Ommanney Is Dead (1955), also published in England as Fatal Relations (1955)
- The Voice of Murder (1956)
- Sleep No More (1958)
- A Graveyard Plot (1959)
- The House of the Enchantress (1959)
- The Woman at Belguardo (1961)
- No. 9 Belmont Square (1963), also published in England as The House in Belmont Square (1963)
- Take a Dark Journey (1965)
- The Family at Tammerton (1966)
- Case with Three Husbands (1967)
- The Ewe Lamb (1968)
- The Case of Mary Fielding (1970)
- The Brood of Folly (1971)
- Don't Look behind You (1972)
- Caravan of Night (1972)
- Besides the Wench Is Dead (1973)
- Harriet, Farewell (1975)
- The House in Hook Street (1977)
