= Isobel Lambot =

British crime writer (1926–2001)

Isobel Mary Lambot (21 July 1926 – found 3 July 2001) was a British writer of crime fiction. She also published works under the pen names Mary Turner and Daniel Ingham.

She was born in Birmingham. Lambot earned a BA from the University of Liverpool and a teaching certificate from the University of Birmingham. She married Maurice Edouard Lambot in 1959. From 1973 to 1980, she tutored evening classes in creative writing.

Lambot left a residential home in Kington on 21 June 2001. After an extensive search by police and local volunteers, she was found dead in Yeld Wood, Hergest Ridge on 3 July.

== Selected works ==
- Taste of Murder (1966)
- Shroud of Canvas (1967)
- Point of Death (1969)
- Watcher on the Shore (1971)
- Contract for Death (1972) as Daniel Ingham
- The Justice Hunt (1975), as Mary Turner
- Runaway Lady (1980), as Mary Turner
- The Craft of Writing Crime Novels (1992), non-fiction
