= Phyllis A. Whitney =

American writer

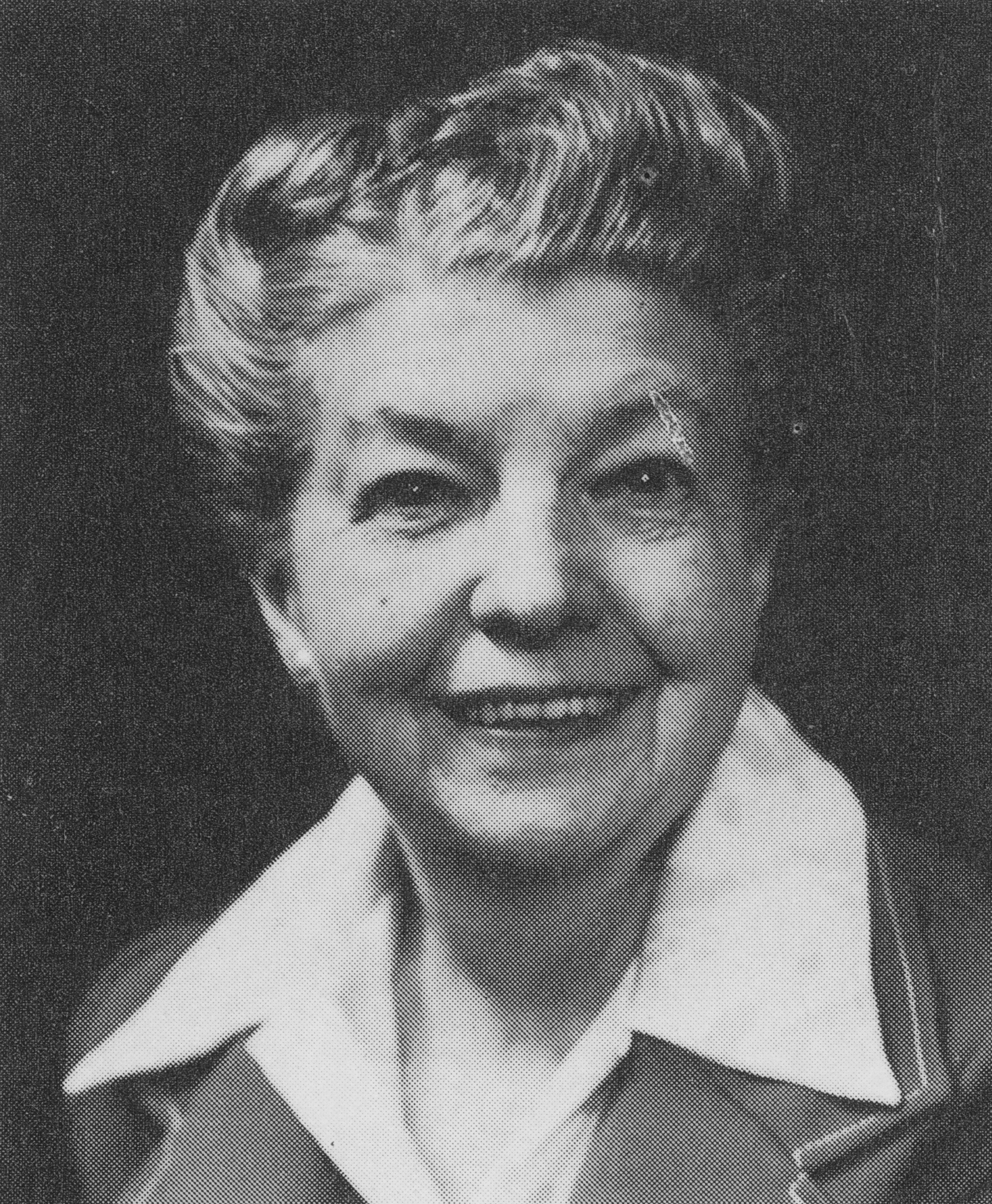
- Whitney c. 1985
- Born: September 9, 1903; Yokohama, Japan
- Died: February 8, 2008 (aged 104); Faber, Virginia, United States
- Occupation: Author
- Years active: 1941–2008

Phyllis Ayame Whitney (September 9, 1903 – February 8, 2008) was an American mystery writer who wrote 73 novels, most all of them in the suspense and mystery genre. 39 of her books were for adults, 20 for young adults (juveniles), and 14 written for children. Her books sold millions of copies and were published in more than thirty countries.

Born in Yokohama, Japan to American parents in 1903, she spent her early years in Asia. After the death of her parents she moved to Chicago where she lived with her aunt. Later in life, Whitney moved to Staten Island, New York and resided there for 20 years with her daughter and second husband, Lovell Jahnke. Staten Island became the inspiration and setting for several of her books.

A rarity for her genre, she wrote mysteries for both the juvenile and the adult markets, many of which feature exotic settings. Although she was often described as a Gothic novelist, a review in The New York Times even dubbing her "The Queen of the American Gothics", Whitney claimed to hate this title. She preferred to say she wrote ”romantic novels of suspense".

Whitney's books were enormously popular for decades, although some critics considered her heroines too demure, the books too chaste or conservative, to which she responded in 1975 to Parade magazine (quoted in her Los Angeles Times obituary by Valerie J. Nelson), “The girls in my books are out solving their own problems. They’ve always been women’s libbers because . . . I’ve always done what I wanted to do."

In 1961, her book The Mystery of the Haunted Pool won an Edgar Award from the Mystery Writers of America for Best Juvenile Novel; she duplicated the honour in 1964 for The Mystery of the Hidden Hand. In 1988, the MWA gave her a Grand Master Award for lifetime achievement. In 1990, she received the Lifetime Achievement Award from the Romance Writers of America. Whitney also wrote three books on writing advice, including one for writing for young people. She also contributed several such articles to The Writer over the years and served on their editorial board for decades.

Whitney died of pneumonia at age 104 on February 8, 2008.

A collection of Whitney's writing, correspondence, and photographs are available at the College of Staten Island's Archives and Special Collections.

== Published works ==
- A Place for Ann (1941)
- A Star for Ginny (1942)
- A Window for Julie (1943)
- Red is for Murder (1943), Reissued as The Red Carnelian (1965)
- The Silver Inkwell (1945)
- Writing Juvenile Fiction (1947)
- Willow Hill (1947)
- Ever After (1948)
- The Mystery of the Gulls (1949)
- Linda's Homecoming (1950)
- The Island of Dark Woods (1951), Reissued as Mystery of the Strange Traveler (1967)
- Love Me, Love Me Not (1952)
- Step to the Music (1953)
- Mystery of the Black Diamonds (1954)
- A Long Time Coming (1954)
- Mystery on the Isle of Skye (1955)
- The Quicksilver Pool (1955)
- The Fire and the Gold (1956)
- The Highest Dream (1956)
- The Trembling Hills (1956)
- Mystery of the Green Cat (1957)
- Skye Cameron (1957)
- Secret of the Samurai Sword (1958)
- The Moonflower (1958)
- Creole Holiday (1959)
- Mystery of the Haunted Pool (1960)
- Thunder Heights (1960)
- Secret of the Tiger's Eye (1961)
- Blue Fire (1961)
- Mystery of the Golden Horn (1962)
- Window on the Square (1962)
- Mystery of the Hidden Hand (1963)
- Seven Tears for Apollo (1963)
- Secret of the Emerald Star (1964)
- Black Amber (1964)
- Mystery of the Angry Idol (1965)
- Sea Jade (1965)
- Columbella (1966)
- Secret of the Spotted Shell (1967)
- Silverhill (1967)
- Hunter's Green (1968)
- Secret of Goblin Glen (1969)
- The Mystery of the Crimson Ghost (1969)
- The Winter People (1969)
- Secret of the Missing Footprint (1969)
- Lost Island (1970)
- The Vanishing Scarecrow (1971)
- Nobody Likes Trina (1972)
- Listen for the Whisperer (1972)
- Mystery of the Scowling Boy (1973)
- Snowfire (1973)
- The Turquoise Mask (1974)
- Secret of Haunted Mesa (1975)
- Spindrift (1975)
- The Golden Unicorn (1976)
- Writing Juvenile Stories and Novels (1976)
- Secret of the Stone Face (1977)
- The Stone Bull (1977)
- The Glass Flame (1978)
- Domino (1979)
- Poinciana (1980)
- Vermilion (1981)
- Guide to Fiction Writing (1982)
- Emerald (1983)
- Rainsong (1984)
- Dream of Orchids (1985)
- Flaming Tree (1986)
- Silversword (1987)
- Feather on the Moon (1988)
- Rainbow in the Mist (1989)
- The Singing Stones (1990)
- Woman Without a Past (1991)
- The Ebony Swan (1992)
- Star Flight (1993)
- Daughter of the Stars (1994)
- Amethyst Dreams (1997)
