= Donald Barr Chidsey =

American novelist

- Born: May 14, 1902; Elizabeth, New Jersey, United States
- Died: March 17, 1981 (aged 78); New London, Connecticut, United States
- Occupations: Historian; biographer; novelist
- Spouse(s): Shirley Chidsey, OSS agent
- Writing career
- Genres: Adventure fiction, historical fiction

Donald Barr Chidsey (May 14, 1902 – March 17, 1981) was an American writer, biographer, historian, novelist and writer of adventure fiction.

== Biography ==
Donald Barr Chidsey was born in Elizabeth, New Jersey, on May 14, 1902. He worked at the Elizabeth Daily Journal, and traveled widely in his youth. He lived in Lyme, Connecticut for many years.

In 1935 he married Shirley Chidsey (born Elinor Shirley Stewart) and went with her to Tahiti, where she sailed in his boat and helped to manage a coconut plantation. While they made friends with a number of writers, including F. Scott Fitzgerald. Shirley separated from him in February 1940. She went to join the Office of Strategic Services (OSS) (CIA’s forerunner), in 1943 she worked in the Belgian Congo to keep the unique uranium mine in Katanga province Shinkolobwe out of the hands of the Axis powers. The uranium was later used in the creation of the bombs dropped on Hiroshima and Nagasaki.

Along with artist W. Langdon Kihn, Chidsey was a Democratic candidate for the Connecticut House of Representatives from the town of Lyme, in the November 2, 1948 election.

Donald Barr Chidsey died on March 17, 1981, in Lawrence Memorial Hospital at New London, Connecticut.

== Writings ==
Chidsey wrote more than fifty books. Chidsey began his writing career as a contributor to the pulp magazines, especially Argosy and Adventure. Chidsey wrote crime fiction for Black Mask and Dime Detective magazines. Chidsey wrote several historical novels, in the "swashbuckler" style of Rafael Sabatini. These included This Bright Sword (1957) about the return of Richard I to England. Captain Bashful (1955) and Reluctant Cavalier (1960), are set in Elizabethan era England. His Majesty's Highwayman (1958) is about a young man forced to join a gang of highwaymen in eighteenth-century England. Stronghold (1948) is set against the backdrop of the War of 1812.

Alden Whitman called him "an old hand at light writing." According to Kirkus Reviews, Chidsey "is known for his popular American histories, and has a nose for a good story." He lived in Lyme, Connecticut for many years.

== Works ==
=== Biographies ===
- Sir Walter Raleigh, That Damned Upstart
- Sir Humphrey Gilbert, Elizabeth's Racketeer
- Marlborough, The Portrait of a Conqueror
- John The Great (boxing champion John L. Sullivan)
- Bonnie Prince Charlie
- The World of Samuel Adams
- Andrew Jackson, Hero
- Elizabeth I: A Great Life in Brief
- The Gentleman from New York: A Life of Roscoe Conkling

=== Histories ===
- The American Privateers
- And Tyler Too
- The Battle of New Orleans
- The Birth of the Constitution
- The California Gold Rush
- The Day They Sank the Lusitania
- The French and Indian War: An Informal History
- Goodbye to Gunpowder: An Informal History
- The Great Conspiracy: Aaron Burr and His Strange Doings in the West
- The Great Separation
- July 4, 1776: The dramatic story of the first four days of July 1776
- Lewis and Clark: The Great Adventure
- The Louisiana Purchase: the story of the biggest real estate deal in history
- The Loyalists: the story of those Americans who fought against independence
- Mr. Hamilton and Mr. Jefferson
- On and Off the Wagon
- The Panama Canal
- Shackleton's Voyage
- The Siege of Boston: an on-the-scene account of the beginning of the American Revolution
- The Spanish–American War: a behind-the-scenes account of the war in Cuba
- The Tide Turns
- Valley Forge
- Victory at Yorktown
- The War in the North: an informal history of the American Revolution in and near Canada
- The War in the South: an informal history of the Carolinas and Georgia in the American Revolution
- The War with Mexico
- The Wars in Barbary: Arab piracy and the birth of the United States Navy

=== Novels ===
- Buccaneer's Blade
- Captain Adam
- Captain Bashful
- Captain Crossbones
- Each One Was Alone
- Edge of Piracy
- Fancy-Man
- The Flaming Island
- His Majesty's Highwayman
- The Legion of the Lost
- Lord of the Isles
- Marooned
- The Naked Sword
- Panama Passage
- The Pipes Are Calling
- Pistols in the Morning
- Reluctant Cavalier
- Rod Rides High
- Singapore Passage
- Stronghold
- This Bright Sword
- Weeping is for Women
- The Wickedest Pilgrim
