= Richard Lamparski =

Richard Lamparski (October 5, 1932 – November 8, 2025) was an American author, broadcaster, and pioneer radio interviewer.

== Early life ==
He was born in Detroit as Richard Lynch, the only child of Virginia (née Downey) and Benjamin Lynch, an adding machine manufacturer worker. His father had changed his family name to Lynch to obscure their Polish ethnicity. Richard, as an adult, reverted to Lamparski.

== Career ==
At 21, Lamparski delivered teletype copy at CBS Columbia Square.

In March 1965, Lamparski started an radio interview show on WBAI, lasting for eight years.

Lamparski wrote the 11-volume pop-culture book series Whatever Became Of...?.

== Personal life ==
In 1960, Lamparski moved to New York City on his birthday. In 1972, he moved back to California.

Lamparski died on November 8, 2025 in Santa Barbara, California at age 93.

== Works ==
- Richard Lamparski, Profile of Louise Brooks Whatever became of ...? : third series. New York : Crown Publishers 1970
- Lamparski, Richard (1986). Whatever Became Of-- ?: 100 Profiles; tenth series. Crown Publishers. ISBN 978-0-517-56229-1.
