= Nicole Maxwell =

American medicinal plant researcher

Nicole Maxwell (1906–1998) was an American-born plant researcher who specialised in natural remedies and medical herbs. She traveled the Amazon jungle gathering plants that could revolutionize the world and legitimize natural remedies as functional medicine. She reportedly amassed over 600 plants that supposedly had a variety of uses.

== Biography ==
Maxwell was raised as the daughter of a wealthy San Francisco Christian Science family. When she was a child, she broke her arm, and her parents refused to take her to the doctor. She eventually sought out a doctor by herself and became interested in medicine. She attended classes at Harvard and Ohio State, specialized in ballet, finally moving to Paris and marrying a general in the U.S. Air Force. At the end of World War II, at the age of 40, she decided to travel in the Amazon basin. Maxwell was with her Indian guide in the jungle when she received a large gash on her arm. Heavy bleeding flowed, and with no close village around to help her, they were on their own. With no medicine in sight, her Indian guide ran to get a specific tree sap and asked her to drink it. She swallowed the fluid, and to her astonishment, the bleeding miraculously stopped after a few minutes and eventually healed with no scars. It was then that she decided to dedicate her life to studying plants and their medicinal powers.

In 1958, Maxwell managed to convince an American pharmaceutical company to fund a trip to the jungle alone. Everyone around her attempted to persuade her that it was a terrible idea, and yet she went. She traveled in the Amazonian wilderness by herself, collecting plants and working closely with any indigenous groups she encountered. She returned ten months later with samples of a variety of diverse plants. Among some of the plants she brought back were the incara tree, used to painlessly extract teeth, chanca piedra leaf, used to expel kidney stones, and an anti-hangover potion. However, when she returned and gave her research to the pharmaceutical company, they never did anything with it. One of her most notable findings was a contraceptive that could alter a woman's fertility for up to eight years.

Maxwell was also employed by the Ecuadorian government to count the indigenous population and its people. With a group of American geographers, she set out to meet and befriend tribes. Using a variety of means like airplanes, and canoes, they traveled together and attempted to accomplish this massive task. A big part of her autobiography, the Witch Doctor's Apprentice, focuses on her interactions with a multitude of natives she stumbles upon. In her book, we see her interacting and managing to negotiate with them to get information skillfully. She was courageous, sensitive, and understood that she needed to show the natives that she meant no harm, which in turn helped her befriend them.

She spent the rest of her life studying medicinal herbs and the secrets of these plants behind the Native Americans.

She died in West Palm Beach, Florida on May 5, 1998.
