= Genevieve Pou =

American mystery novelist

- Born: Genevieve Long; October 23, 1919; Tupelo, Mississippi, United States
- Died: April 22, 2007 (aged 87); Atlanta, Georgia, United States
- Occupations: Novelist; short story writer; journalist
- Writing career
- Pen name: Genevieve Holden
- Genres: mystery fiction, essays, literary criticism

Genevieve Long Pou (/ˈpjuː/; October 23, 1919 – April 22, 2007) was a novelist and writer based in Atlanta, Georgia.

== Biography ==
Pou was born in Tupelo, Mississippi. During her life she published seven mystery novels under the pseudonym Genevieve Holden. She attended the University of Mississippi and the University of Georgia. During World War II, she worked as a journalist on the Birmingham Post and Idaho Statesman newspapers. She married Charles D. Pou, the political editor and columnist for the Atlanta Journal; they had two daughters.

Her mystery novels were all set in the Southern United States and frequently featured a female protagonist. The protagonist would become involved with a dangerous male figure during the course of the story. The locations of the novels matched those in her life. Her early novels were set on Southern farms similar to the one she grew up on near Tupelo. Her last was set in Midtown Atlanta, where she spent the last years of her career and life.

In addition to her mystery novels, Pou was a literary celebrity in Atlanta during the 1960s, 1970s and 1980s. She frequently wrote articles for local magazines and contributed to Atlanta public-affairs television shows. She was well known as a philanthropist and frequent contributor to liberal and feminist political causes.

Pou died from complications of pneumonia in 2007, in Atlanta, Georgia, aged 87.

== Selected works ==
- Killer Loose! (Doubleday, 1953)
- Sound An Alarm (Doubleday, 1954)
- The Velvet Target (Doubleday, 1956)
- Something's Happened To Kate (Doubleday, 1958)
- Deadlier Than The Male (Doubleday, 1961)
- Don't Go In Alone (Doubleday, 1965)
- Down A Dark Alley (Doubleday, 1976)

== Sources ==
- "Archives and Special Collections, University of Mississippi". hermes.lib.olemiss.edu. Archived from the original on 2016-03-03.
- "Obituary: GENEVIEVE HOLDEN (1919-2007)". mysteryfile.com.
- "MWP: Lives of Mississippi Writers, 1817-1967 - Introduction". olemiss.edu. Archived from the original on 2012-02-09.
- Spritzer, L.N.; Bergmark, J.B. (2009). Grace Towns Hamilton and the Politics of Southern Change. University of Georgia Press. p. 237. ISBN 9780820333878.
