= Peter J. Steincrohn =

American cardiologist and author

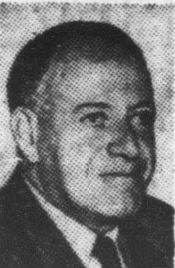
- Steincrohn in 1961
- Born: November 28, 1899; Hartford Connecticut
- Died: February 17, 1986 (aged 86); Coral Gables, Florida
- Occupation(s): doctor, author

Peter Joseph Steincrohn (November 28, 1899 - February 17, 1986) was an American doctor and author, known for the syndicated newspaper column with medical advice that he wrote from 1954 through 1986 which was published in places like Reader's Digest and the Saturday Evening Post.

== Early life and education ==
Steincrohn was born to Myer and Pearl (Brownstein) Steincrohn on November 28, 1899 in Hartford, Connecticut. He got his medical degree from the University of Maryland School of Medicine in 1923.

== Medical career ==
Steincrohn interned at Muhlenberg Hospital in Plainfield N.J. He later did postgraduate work at Massachusetts General and Beth Israel Hospital, both in Boston.

Steincrohn worked at Mount Sinai and McCook Memorial hospitals, both in Hartford, Connecticut. His primary practice was as an internist and a cardiologist. He moved to Coral Gables, Florida in 1955 and began focusing on writing and producing a television program.

== Media career ==
Steincrohn's syndicated columns, which he wrote for the McNaught Syndicate, were published in over 100 newspapers in the United States and Canada. He also wrote over two dozen popular books on medical topics. His primary column, "Stop Killing Yourself"—named after his popular book How to Stop Killing Yourself—was written by him until six months before his death in 1986.

He was the Medical Editor for WTVJ-TV in Miami, Florida and hosted a medical show on WTHS-TV. In 1961 he released a spoken word album entitled Mr. Executive: Keep Well - Live Longer, dedicated to "The American Executive, and his wife who wants to keep him alive!"

He was noted for his suggestion that, contrary to Walter Pitkin's adage that "life begins at 40," a better health approach is "Rest begins at 40." His focus was on giving sensible, realistic health advice for people, supporting the idea of moderate, not aggressive, exercise especially as people age. The New York Times said that his book about high blood pressure had "taken this terrifying symptom out of the miasma of complex science and warped common knowledge and set it into a comprehensible and comforting guide." One of his columns was quoted in the James Bond movie, From Russia With Love, about how many organs the human body could do without.

== Personal life ==
Patti Chapin, a former Ziegfeld Follies singer, and Peter Steincrohn married on February 8, 1936. They had one daughter, Barbara Jane, and two grandchildren.

== Bibliography ==
- You Don’t Have to Exercise: Rest begins at forty! (1942) – Doubleday
- Heart Disease is Curable (1943)
- Forget Your Age! (1945)
- How to Stop Killing Yourself (1950) - Grosset & Dunlap
- Heart Worry and Its Cure (1951) - Wilfred Funk
- How To Master Your Fears (1952)
- How to Add Years to Your Life (1952)
- How to Keep Fit without Exercise (1955)
- Live Longer And Enjoy It (1956)
- You Can Increase Your Heart Power (1958)
- Health and Life After Forty (1961) – Fawcett
- How to Add Years to Your Life and Life to Your Years (1965) – Fawcett
- How to get a good night's sleep (1968) - H. Regnery Co ISBN 9781131283098
- How to Be Lazy, Healthy, and Fit (1968)
- Your heart is stronger than you think (1970) - Cowles Book Company ISBN 9780402125617
- How to Master Your Nerves (1970) - Cowles Book Company ISBN 9780402120360
- Don't die before your time: The common-sense way to better health and longer life (1971) - Nash Pub ISBN 9780840211996
- Low Blood Sugar (1973) - Signet ISBN 9780451156952
- Ask Dr. Steincrohn: What You Always Wanted to Ask Your Doctor but Didn't (1979) - Acropolis Books ISBN 9780874912784
- How to Cure Your Jogger Mania!: Enjoy Fitness and Good Health without Running – A Doctor’s Warning on the Running Craze. (1980)
