= Horace T. Elmo =

American cartoonist

- Born: Arazio Theodore Elmo; April 3, 1903 New York City, NY, U.S.
- Died: October 23, 1992 (aged 89) Bronx, New York, U.S.
- Area: Cartoonist
- Pseudonyms: Jackson; Teddy; Horace Elmo; H. T. Elmo
- Notable works: Lincoln Newspaper Syndicate; Elmo Features Syndicate
- Spouses: Martha Oliver (m. 1928, unknown) Vilma A. Molnar (m. 1931)

Horace Theodore Elmo (born Arazio Theodore Elmo; 3 April 1903 – October 23, 1992) was an American comic strip cartoonist particularly active in the 1930s and 1940s; he also ran a comic strip syndication service whose main claim to fame was that it employed Jack Kirby in the late 1930s.

== Biography ==
He was born Arazio Theodore Elmo in Manhattan (later moving to Brooklyn and then the Bronx), the sixth of seven children of Italian immigrants Joseph and Josephine Elmo.

It is not known if or where Elmo received art training, but early cartoons were published on the "amateur pages" in Judge magazine. After starting out as a stock clerk in the export business, he worked as a cartoonist with the local tabloid the New York Evening Graphic.

Elmo's first recorded comic strip was the daily strip Little Otto, "which was to be syndicated beginning in 1926 by Wheeler-Nicholson, Inc. It's unclear if the strip was ever published."

His first professionally published work were six episodes of the recurring one-page feature Did You Know That for the film magazine Picture Play in 1932–1933.

He started the weekly syndication service Lincoln Newspaper Syndicate (also known as Lincoln Features Syndicate and Lincoln News Syndicate) in 1935, beginning with Larry Antonette's Dash Dixon, and followed by Biff Baxter's Adventures, Detective Riley, Little Buddy, Your Health Comes First!!!, and Socko the Sea Dog (a takeoff on Popeye).

In the period 1935–1939, Elmo worked on a number of strips of his own, including Facts You Never Knew, The Fizzle Family, Goofus Family, and Laughs from Today's News. He also ghosted some Lincoln service strips, including Socko the Seadog and Your Health Comes First!!!.

Jack Kirby joined Elmo's syndicate in 1936, working on strips and single-panel advice cartoons such as Your Health Comes First!!! (under the pseudonym Jack Curtiss), as well as Abdul Jones, The Black Buccaneer, Cyclone Burke, Detective Riley, and Socko the Seadog. While with the syndicate, Kirby also did the artwork for a 24-page pamphlet produced for the banking industry, called The Romance of Money. Kirby remained with the syndicate until late 1939, when he began working for the theatrical animation company Fleischer Studios.

After a two-year hiatus, from 1941 to 1946 Elmo worked on some new weekly strips, including It's Amazing, Sally Snickers, and Useless Eustace.

Elmo's Lincoln service operated until c. 1945, when he restarted it as Elmo Features Syndicate, sometimes employing the talents of the Roche-Iger Studio; but that syndicate also didn't last.

After the demise of his syndication service, Elmo did some work in the comic book industry, for both National Comics Publications and Timely Comics.

In the late 1950s/early 1960s, Ace Books published three Elmo cartoon collections; he also packaged books sold in the United Kingdom, including 150 Games to Play, The Complete Book of Space, and 101 Things to Make and Play.

Elmo's later strips included The Rhyming Romeos, which ran exclusively in the African-American newspaper the Arkansas State Press in the 1950s; and Puggy and Tell Me, which ran exclusively in the Hubbard, Ohio, News Reporter in the 1960s and in the Spirit Lake Beacon in the mid-1970s.

=== Personal life and death ===
Elmo was married twice; first to Martha Oliver, and then to Vilma A. Molnar. He and Vilma had two children — Elaine and Horace Jr.

Horace T. Elmo died in the Bronx in 1992.

== Bibliography ==
=== Strips and panels ===
- Detective Riley (1935–c. 1943)
- Facts You Never Knew (1935-1939)
- The Fizzle Family (1935–1939)
- Goofus Family (1935-1939)
- It's Amazing (1941–1946)
- Laughs from Today's News (1935–1939)
- Our Puzzle Corner (1936)
- Puggy (1960–mid-1970s)
- The Rhyming Romeos (1950s) — copyrighted by Famous Funnies; ran exclusively in the Arkansas State Press
- Sally Snickers (1941–1946)
- Socko the Seadog (1935–1939)
- Tell Me (1960–mid-1970s)
- Useless Eustace (1941-1946)
- Your Health Comes First (1935–1939)

=== Comics ===
- Quick Quizzes (National Periodicals, 1951–1955) — filler
- It's Amazing (Timely Comics, 1949)
- Oscar Comics (Timely Comics, 1949) — the feature Little Aspirin

=== Books ===
- Modern Casanova's Handbook (Ace Books S-093, 1955)
- Hollywood Humor (Ace Books S-140, 1957)
- Mad. Ave. (Ace Books D-533, 1961)

== Lincoln Newspaper Syndicate/Elmo Features Syndicate strips and panels ==
- Abdul Jones (c. 1936–1939) by Jack Kirby
- Biff Baxter's Adventures (1935–?) by "Bob Dart" (a.k.a. Larry Antonette)
- The Black Buccaneer by Jack Kirby
- Cyclone Burke (ghosted by Jack Kirby)
- Dash Dixon (1930–1939) by "Dean Carr" (a.k.a. Larry Antonette)
- Detective Riley (1935–c. 1943) by "Richard Lee" (ghosted by Jack Kirby, H. T. Elmo, and others)
- Did You Know by Topps (1939–1944)
- Little Buddy by "Bruce Stuart" (1935–?)
- Nappy by Irv Tirman (1939–1944)
- Socko the Sea Dog (1935–1944) by H. T. Elmo (1935–1939) and then "Teddy" (1939–1944) — at some point ghosted by Jack Kirby
- Useless Eustace (1941–1946)
- Your Health Comes First!!! by Jack Kirby (under the pseudonym "Jack Curtis") (1935–1939)

== See also ==
- Al Smith Feature Service
