= Sheila Bishop =

English novelist

- Born: Dorothy Sheila Kinsman; 3 October 1916; 52 Cadogan Square, London SW1, England, United Kingdom
- Died: 30 May 2009 (aged 92); Penzance, Cornwall, England, United Kingdom
- Occupation: Novelist
- Years active: 1958 - 1990s

Sheila Bishop (3 October 1916 – 30 May 2009) was an English novelist. She had 27 books published. Her early work alternated between plots set in the Tudor period and the contemporary 1960s, some with flashbacks to the 1930s and 1940s. In later years she concentrated on Regency romance novels, and these formed by far the greater part of her output.

== Biography ==
Dorothy Sheila Kinsman was born at 52 Cadogan Square within the sound of Bow Bells which made her a true Cockney. Her parents were Gerald Richard Vivian Kinsman and Dorothy (née Whitaker).

Aged four she travelled to South America where her father was Military Attache to Chile and Brazil. Apart from journeys home on leave she lived in Chile until she was nine.

She worked for the Foreign Office and then at Kelvedon Hall, (the country home of Henry "Chips" Channon which had been temporarily converted into a convalescent home), and then for the Red Cross.

In 1943 Sheila travelled on a troop ship to Algiers, and began three years of Red Cross work in North Africa, and Italy where she witnesses the eruption of Vesuvius (1944) as described to Raleigh Trevelyan in Shadow of Vesuvius. At around this time she met her husband Geoffrey Bishop, who, and ADMS was in charge of medical services in the area. On her way home in 1945 Sheila spent time in Rome and visited members of her mother's Whitaker family who had been more or less under house arrest during hostilities. On her arrival in England her first port of call was St Mary's Hospital Paddington for an operation to save her failing eyesight.

In 1947 Sheila married Geoffrey and began life in Shepton Mallet as a country doctor's wife, her daughter was born in 1948. In those days there were no health centres or doctor's receptionists. Long hours confined to the house manning the telephone led to the start of her writing career In the 1950s. In 1964, on her husband's retirement, they moved to 36 Belvedere, Bath. She was now registered blind. She joined the Jane Austen Society and NADFAS, became a guide at Number One Royal Crescent and volunteered for the Housebound Library Service. When Geoffrey died in 1987 (he was twenty one years her senior) She started going to Bristol University summer schools studying such topics as the Romantic Poets and archaeology. She left Bath in 2006 and moved to Cornwall for the last three years of her life. She had four grandchildren and two great-grandchildren. She died on 30 May 2009 and is buried at Penwith Woodland Burial ground near Penzance.

== Themes and writing practice ==
Sheila's early work produced between 1958 and 1970 were Elizabethan and modern novels written more or less alternatively. After that, and because she was now living in Bath, she became fascinated by the Georgian period and most of her plots were set in the eighteenth century or Regency. All her novels were pure fiction but they related to places and or situations from her own life. The two exceptions to this were Penelope Devereux (1966) and The Favourite Sister (1967) the theme of these was the life and times of Robert Devereux Earl of Essex, Queen Elizabeth the First's favourite, from the viewpoint of his sister Penelope. She called her novels light entertainment though she disliked the label "Romance". She stated that her books, despite having a central love story, had a definite plot generally independent of the love interest, a tangle of relationships, something to be achieved and a mystery solved in the last chapter. She said the plots came very easily to her what she found slow and difficult was the writing, that is, choosing the actual words to use.

Her first books were written by hand in exercise books and then typed out on her father's early 20th century Corona typewriter which had three rows of keys. Thereafter she had a larger machine. This situation continued until she could no longer read her own typescript at which point she "wrote" straight onto C90 cassette, copying this on to a second cassette on a twin track tape recorder making alterations along the way through the microphone. She typed out a copy of this (which she was unable to read) and passed this to a professional typist to make a fair copy for the publisher.

A number of her earlier book jackets were illustrated by Val Biro.

== Bibliography ==
- The Durable Fire (1958)
- The House With Two Faces (1960)
- The Second Husband. Serialised in Woman's Realm as The Splendid Phoenix (1964)
- Impatient Griselda (1965) aka Desperate Decision
- Sweet Nightingale (1966)
- Penelope Devereux (1966)
- The Favourite Sister (1967)
- That Night at the Villa (1968)
- Goldsmiths Row (1969)
- The Onlooker (1971)
- No Hint of Scandal (1971)
- The Wilderness Walk (1972)
- The Quick Brown Fox (1972)
- The Parsons Daughter (1973) aka Bath Assembly
- The Phantom Garden (1974) (Serialised for BBC Woman's Hour 1975)
- A London Season (1975)
- A Speaking Likeness (1976)
- Long Summer Shadows (1978) aka Lucasta
- The Rules of Marriage (1979)
- The school in Belmont (1981) aka Honora Clare
- Consequences (1981)
- Rosalba (1982) Serialised in Woman's Realm (1982)
- True Lovers Knot (1986)
- A Well matched Pair (1987)
- A Marriage Made on Earth (1990)
- Fair Game (1992)
- A Change of Climate (1995 Published by Caliber Audio Library)
