= Suzanne Roberts =

American poet

Suzanne Roberts (born October 2, 1970) is an American poet, travel writer, and photographer.

== Biography ==
Suzanne Roberts was born in New York City to a British mother and Jewish father. She grew up in Southern California and currently lives in South Lake Tahoe, California. She is the author of a collection of lyrical essays, Animal Bodies: On Death, Desire, and Other difficulties (University of Nebraska Press, 2022), the memoir in travel essays, Bad Tourist: Misadventures in Love and Travel (University of Nebraska Press, 2020), and the memoir Almost Somewhere: Twenty-Eight Days on the John Muir Trail, as well as four collections of poetry, Shameless (2007), Nothing to You (2008), Three Hours to Burn a Body: Poems on Travel (2011) and Plotting Temporality (2012).

Roberts was named "The Next Great Travel Writer" by National Geographic's Traveler, and her work has appeared in numerous magazines and journals, including Atlanta Review, The Fourth River, Matador, National Geographic's Intelligent Traveler, and National Geographic's Traveler. She received an "Honorable Mention" in the "Best Free Poetry Contest" in 2011 for her poems The Casualties of War and A Soldier's Making.

Roberts holds degrees in Biology and English from Cal Poly, San Luis Obispo, and a doctorate in English with an emphasis in Literature and the Environment from University of Nevada, Reno. She is on the MFA low residency faculty at UNR-Tahoe.

== Selected works ==
=== Books ===
- Almost Somewhere: Twenty-Eight Days on the John Muir Trail (University of Nebraska Press, 2012)
- Shameless (Cherry Grove Collections, 2007)
- Nothing to You (Pecan Grove Press, 2008) (poem Crossing Paths)
- Three Hours to Burn a Body: Poems on Travel (Cherry Grove Collection, 2011)
- Bad Tourist: Misadventures in Love and Travel (University of Nebraska Press, 2020)
- Animal Bodies: On Death, Desire, and Other Difficulties (University of Nebraska Press, 2022)

=== Anthologies ===
- The Ghost of Muir Pass, The Pacific Crest Trailside Reader. The Mountaineers Press, 2011.

== Awards ==
- National Outdoor Book Award for Almost Somewhere, Literature Category, 2012
- Eda Kriseova Fellowship for Nonfiction Writing in Prague, 2011
- Fourth River Award for Poetry, "Poulty Stall," 2009
- "The Next Great Travel Writer" Award
- Travcoa and National Geographic Traveler, 2008
