= Irene Mossop =

British writer (1904–1988)

Irene Maude Mossop Swatridge
- Born: Irene Maude Mossop; 6 December 1904; Woking, Surrey, England, UK
- Died: 26 October 1988 (aged 83); England, UK
- Occupation: novelist
- Spouse: Charles John Swatridge (1934–1964)
- Writing career
- Pen name: Irene Mossop, Jan Tempest, Fay Chandos, Virginia Storm, Theresa Charles (with Charles John Swatridge), Leslie Lance (with/after Charles John Swatridge)
- Language: English
- Period: 1928–1987
- Genres: Children's, romance

Irene Swatridge, née Irene Maude Mossop (6 December 1904 in Woking, Surrey, England – 26 October 1988 in England) was a British writer of over 175 children's and romance novels.

Swatridge wrote under her maiden and married names, as well as under the pseudonyms of Jan Tempeste, Fay Chandos, and Virginia Storm. She also wrote in collaboration with her husband Charles John Swatridge (1896–1964) under the pseudonyms of Theresa Charles and Leslie Lance, and after his death under the pseudonyms alone.

== Life and career ==
Born Irene Maude Mossop on 6 December 1904 in Woking, Surrey, England, she was the elder child of Maude Binford Eyre and Robert Mossop, a solicitor, later she had a brother. She was educated privately.

Swatridge started writing very young, and after her father's death she started publishing girls' schools novels as Irene Mossop. In 1934, she married a former RAF officer and recently widowed Charles John Swatridge (1896–1964). They moved to a Devon farm, where she continued writing.

After her marriage, Swatridge started to write gothic and romance novels, first as Jan Tempest and later as Fay Chandos. In collaboration with her husband, Swatridge published as Theresa Charles, years later, also published with her husband some novels as Leslie Lance, and after his death she continued using the pseudonym alone.

In the 1950s, Swatridge had serious discussions with Alan Boon of Mills & Boon about her novel Without A Honeymoon when she introduced the idea of an illegitimate child. He felt that she would encounter difficulties with the Irish audience.

Swatridge died on 26 October 1988.

== Bibliography ==
=== As Irene Mossop ===
- Well Played Juliana! (1928)
- Prunella Plays the Game (1929)
- Chris in Command (1930)
- Freesia's Feud (1930)
- Hilary Leads the Way (1930)
- Nicky – New Girl (1930)
- Sylvia Sways the School (1930)
- The Luck of the Oakleighs (1930)
- Theresa's First Term (1930)
- Champion Book for Girls (1931)
- Rona's Rival (1931)
- Vivien of St. Val's (1931)
- Pleasure Book for Girls (1932)
- A Rebel at Rowan's (1932)
- Barbara Black-Sheep (1932)
- Una Wins Through (1932)
- Feud In The Fifth (1933)
- The Taming of Prickles (1933)
- Play Up, Pine House! (1934)
- The Fifth at Cliff House (1934)
- The Four V's (1934)
- Theda Marhs (1935)
- Theresa on Trial (1935)
- The Gay Adventure (1937)
- Charm's Last Chance (1948)

=== As Jan Tempest ===
- All This I Gave (1936)
- Someone New to Love (1936)
- No Other Man (1937)
- Because My Love Is Come (1938)
- Man-and Waif (1938)
- Romance on Ice (1942)
- If You'll Marry Me (1943)
- Utility Husband (1944)
- Westward to My Love (1944)
- House of the Pines (1946)
- Cinderella Had Two Sisters (1948)
- How Can I Forget? (1948)
- Never Another Love (1949)
- Promise of Paradise (1949)
- Short-Cut to the Stars (1949)
- A Match Is Made (1950)
- Nobody Else – Ever (1950)
- Now and Always (1950)
- Until I Find Her (1950)
- Two Loves for Tamara (1951)
- Happy Is the Wooing (1952)
- Open the Door to Love (1952)
- Without a Honeymoon (1952)
- Give her Gardenias (1953)
- Meet Me By Moonlight (1953)
- Enchanted Valley (1954)
- First Time of Asking (1954)
- Ask Me Again (1955) aka Nurse Willow's Ward
- Where the Heart Is (1955)
- For Those in Love (1956)
- Wedding Bells for Willow (1956)
- Craddock's Kingdom (1957)
- Will Not Now Take Place (1957)
- Because There Is Hope (1958)
- The Youngest Sister (1958) aka Jubilee Hospital
- Romance for Rose (1959)
- Stranger to Love (1960)
- Mistress of Castlemount (1961)
- That Nice Nurse Nevin (1963)
- The Madderleys Married (1963)
- The Flower and the Fruit (1964)
- The Way We Used to Be (1965)
- The Lonesome Road (1966)
- Meant to Kill (1967)
- Meant to Meet (1967)
- Lyra, My Love (1969)
- Mistress of Martinscombe (1973/12)
- Doctor from Nowhere (1978/08)

=== As Fay Chandos ===
- Man of My Dreams (1937)
- No Escape from Love (1937)
- No Limit to Love (1937)
- Before I make you Mine (1938)
- Gay Knight I Love (1938)
- Wife for a Wager (1938)
- All I Ask (1939)
- When Three Walk Together (1939)
- Husband for Hire (1940)
- Substitute for Sherry (1940)
- When We Two Parted (1940)
- You Should Have Warned Me (1940)
- Only a Touch (1941)
- Women Are So Simple (1941)
- A Letter to My Love (1942)
- Awake, My Love! (1942)
- A Man to Follow (1943)
- Eve and I (1943)
- Away from Each Other (1944)
- Just a Little Longer (1944)
- Made to Marry (1944)
- A Man for Margaret (1945)
- Three Roads to Romance (1945)
- Home Is the Hero (1946)
- When Time Stands Still (1946)
- Because I Wear Your Ring (1947)
- Cousins May Kiss (1947)
- Lost Summer (1948)
- Since First We Met (1948)
- June in Her Eyes (1949)
- There is a Tide (1950)
- First and Favourite Wife (1951)
- Now and Always (1951)
- Families Are Such Fun (1952)
- Find Another Eden (1953)
- Leave It to Nancy (1953)
- The Other One (1953)
- Doctors Are Different (1954)
- Just Before the Wedding (1954)
- Hibiscus House (1955) aka Nurse Incognito
- Husbands at Home (1955)
- So Nearly Married (1956)
- Partners Are a Problem (1957)
- The Romantic Touch (1957)
- Model Girl's Farm (1958)
- Nan – and the New Owner (1959)
- Wild Violets (1959)
- Where Four Ways Meet (1961)
- Sister Sylvan (1962)
- Two Other People (1964)
- Don't Give Your Heart Away (1966)
- Farm By the Sea (1967)
- Strangers in Love (1967)
- Three of Us (1970/03)
- Sweet Rosemary (1973/10)

=== As Virginia Storm ===
- First I Must Forget (1951)
- Ugly Prince (1950)

=== As Theresa Charles ===
- The Distant Drum (1940)
- My Enemy and I (1941)
- To Save My Life (1946)
- Happy Now I Go (1947) aka Dark Legacy (filmed in 1950 as The Woman with No Name)
- Man-Made Miracle (1949)
- At a Touch I Yield (1952)
- Fairer Than She (1953)
- My Only Love (1954)
- The Kinder Love (1955)
- The Burning Beacon (1956)
- The Ultimate Surrender (1958)
- A Girl Called Evelyn (1959)
- No Through Road (1960)
- House on the Rocks (1962)
- Ring for Nurse Raine (1962)
- Patient in Love (1963)
- Widower's Wife (1963) aka Return to Terror
- Nurse Alice in Love (1964) aka Lady in the Mist
- The Man for Me (1965) aka The Shrouded Tower
- How Much You Mean to Me (1966)
- Proud Citadel (1967)
- The Shadowy Third (1967)
- The Way Men Love (1967)
- From Fairest Flowers (1969/02)
- Wayward as the Swallow (1970/02)
- Second Honeymoon (1970/05)
- My True Love (1971/04)
- Therefore Must Be Loved (1972/08)
- Castle Kelpiesloch (1973/07)
- Nurse by Accident (1974/05)
- Flower and the Nettle (1975/05)
- One Who Remembers (1975/07)
- Trust Me, My Love (1975/10)
- Rainbow After Rain (1977/03)
- Crisis at St. Chad's (1977/08)
- Just for One Weekend (1978/06)
- Surgeon's Reputation (1979/06)
- With Somebody Else (1981/02)
- Surgeon's Sweetheart (1981/08)
- No Easier Road to Love (1983/02)
- Always in My Heart (1985/04)

=== As Leslie Lance ===
- Man of the Family (1952)
- Sisters in Love (1960)
- Spun by the Moon (1960)
- A Summer's Grace (1961)
- Springtime for Sally (1962)
- Spreading Sails (1963)
- The Young Curmudgeon (1964)
- Bright Winter (1965)
- I'll Ride Beside You (1965)
- Bride of Emersham (1967)
- No Summer Beauty (1967)
- Return to King's Mere (1967)
- Nurse in the Woods (1969) aka The House in the Woods
- Summer People (1969/07)
- Nurse Verena at Weirwater (1970/02)
- Nurse on the Moors (1970/04)
- No Laggard in Love (1971/04)
- New Lord Whinbridge (1973/03)
- Now I Can Forget (1973/08)
- Love That Lasts (1974/09)
- Maverton Heiress (1975/04)
- The Return of the Cuckoo (1976/03)
- Island House (1976/08)
- Romance at Wreckers' Point (1976/11)
- Cousins By Courtesy (1977/04)
- Family on the Farm (1978/01)
- Orchid Girl (1978/09)
- Girl in the Mauve Mini (1979/03)
- Rose Princess (1979/11)
- Doctor in the Snow (1980/07)
- Hawk's Head (1981/11)
- Someone Who Cares (1982/03)
- Dear Patience (1983/08)
- Heiress to the Isle (1987/10)
