= Peter Leslie =

Australian cricketer (born 1947)

Personal information
- Born: 24 February 1947 (age 79); Bexley, New South Wales, Australia
- Source: ESPNcricinfo, 5 January 2017

Peter Leslie (born 24 February 1947) is an Australian cricketer. He played seven first-class matches for New South Wales between 1965/66 and 1968/69.

== See also ==
- List of New South Wales representative cricketers
