= Todhunter Ballard =

American novelist (1903–1980)

Willis Todhunter Ballard (December 14, 1903 – December 27, 1980) was an American writer, known for his Westerns and mystery novels.

== Pseudonyms ==
Ballard was a prolific pulp writer, most notably for the legendary mystery magazine Black Mask under the name W.T. Ballard. He also authored several mystery and crime novels under that name. Ballard wrote western novels as Todhunter Ballard and the following pseudonyms: P.D. Ballard, Neil MacNeil, Jack Slade, Hunter D'Allard, Clay Turner, John Hunter, Sam Bowie, Parker Bonner, Brian Fox, and Clint Reno. He wrote numerous teleplays for shows such as Death Valley Days and Shannon.

== Personal ==
Ballard was born on December 13, 1903, in Cleveland, Ohio.

Ballard attended schools in Cleveland and Westtown Township, Pennsylvania. In 1926 he graduated from Wilmington College, Wilmington, Ohio. He was married to Phoebe Dwiggins, daughter of Clare Victor Dwiggins, the popular American cartoonist known as "Dwig."

Ballard was a cousin of acclaimed mystery writer Rex Stout.

He died December 27, 1980.

== Work ==
Ballard wrote thousands of magazine stories and over fifty television scripts. Almost all of these stories were in the mystery or western genre. Ballard died on December 27, 1980, in Mount Dora, Florida. "Many of Ballard's novels are set... in Las Vegas, and he always does a convincing job of portraying this fascinating, seldom utilized desert locale with its wide-open casinos, its moral ambiguity, and the uneasy alliance between gamblers and police."—Stephen Mertz

== Partial bibliography ==
=== Mysteries/Crime ===
- Say Yes to Murder (1942)
- Murder Can't Stop (1947)
- Murder in Hollywood (1951)
- Walk in Fear (1952)
- Chance Elson (1958)
- Murder Las Vegas Style (1958)
- Fury in the Heart (1959)
- Pretty Miss Murder (1961)
- The Seven Sisters (1962)
- Mexican Slay Ride (1962)
- Three for the Money (1963)
- Death Takes an Option (1958) as Neil MacNeil
- Third on a Seesaw (1959) as Neil MacNeil
- Two Guns For Hire (1959) as Neil MacNeil
- Hot Dam (1960) as Neil MacNeil
- The Death Ride (1960) as Neil MacNeil
- Mexican Slay Ride (1962) as Neil MacNeil
- The Spy Catchers (1966) as Neil MacNeil
- Brothers in Blood (1972) as PD Ballard
- Angel of Death (1973) as PD Ballard
- The Death Brokers (1973) as PD Ballard

=== Westerns ===
- Two-Edged Vengeance (1951) aka The Circle C Feud (1952)
- Incident at Sun Mountain (1952)
- West of Quarantine (1953)
- High Iron (1953)
- Oulaw Brand (1954) as Parker Bonner
- Trigger Trail (1955)
- Guns of the Lawless (1956)
- Trail Town Marshall (1957)
- The Marshall from Deadwood (1958) as John Hunter
- Trouble on the Massacre (1959)
- The Night Riders (1961)
- The Long Sword (1962) as Hunter D'Allard
- Gopher Gold (1962)
- Desperation Valley (1964)
- Gold in California! (1965)
- Lassiter (1968) as Jack Slade
- The Wild Bunch (1969) as Brian Fox
- Sabata (1969) as Brian Fox
- A Western Bonanza: Eight Short Novels of the West (1969)
- Chisum (1970) as Sam Bowie
- The Californian (1971)
- Nowhere Left to Run (1972)
- Loco and the Wolf (1973)
- Home to Texas (1974)
- Sierra Massacre (1974) as Clint Reno
- Trails of Rage (1975)
- The Sheriff of Tombstone (1977)
- Lost Gold: A Western Duo

== Awards ==
- Spur Award, 1965 for ‘’Gold in California!’’.
