= Elizabeth Salter =

Australian biographer and crime novelist

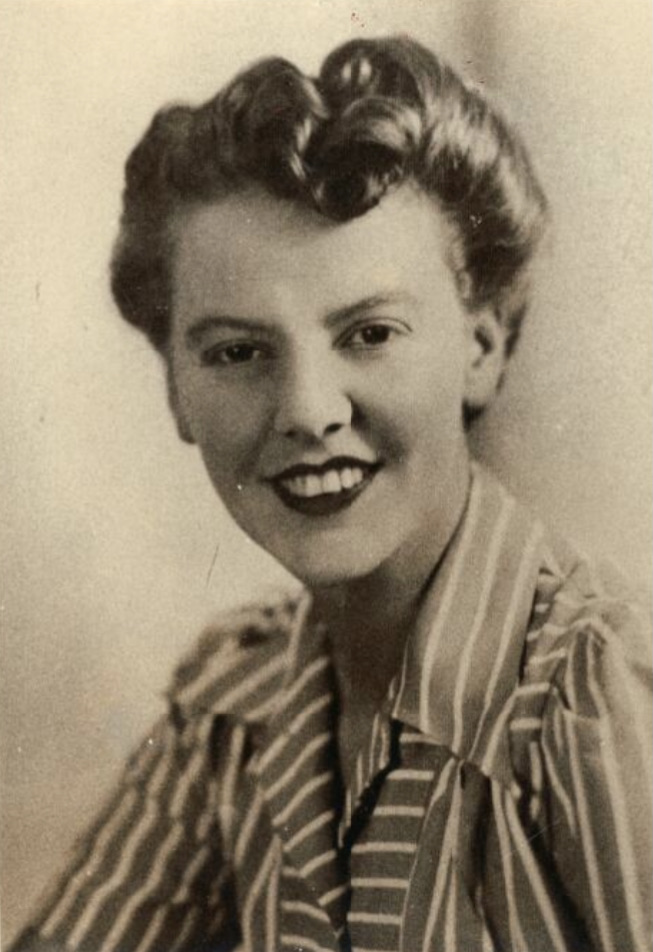
- Salter in 1951
- Born: 2 October 1918; Angaston, South Australia
- Died: 14 March 1981 (aged 62); London, England

Elizabeth Fulton Salter (2 October 1918 – 14 March 1981) was an Australian biographer and crime novelist. She was secretary to Edith Sitwell from 1957 until the latter's death in 1964.

== Education and career ==
Salter was born in Angaston in the Barossa Valley and educated locally and then at the Wilderness School. She graduated from the University of Adelaide and the Elder Conservatorium of Music.

She moved to England in 1952 and where she found work with the BBC, before being employed as secretary to Edith Sitwell in 1957. Although based in Hampstead, Salter retained her sense of being Australian.

In reviewing Salter's memoir of Sitwell in 1967, John Whitwell wrote in The Canberra Times, "As an Australian, Miss Salter was able to pierce the hierarchical etiquettes in which Dame Edith lived, to the great advantage of each. Her book sits modestly and worthily alongside such memoirs as Neville Cardus' book on Sir Thomas Beecham."

Salter was granted a Commonwealth Literary Fellowship in 1969 to research and write a biography of Daisy Bates. Film rights were sold to Katharine Hepburn and Robert Helpmann before the book was complete. It was later adapted for film by Eleanor Witcombe, with Hepburn to take the leading role.

On one of many visits to Australia in 1980 she was seeking to write a biography of Maie, Lady Casey.

Salter died in London on 14 March 1981.

The National Library of Australia holds 27 boxes of her papers.

== Works ==
=== Biographies ===
- The Last Years of a Rebel: A Memoir of Edith Sitwell, Bodley Head, 1967
- Daisy Bates: Queen of the Never Never, Angus & Robertson, 1971
- The lost impressionist: a biography of John Peter Russell, Angus & Robertson,1976
- Helpmann: The authorised biography of Robert Helpmann, Angus & Robertson, 1978
- Edith Sitwell, Oresko Books, 1979

=== Crime novels ===
- Death in a Mist, Geoffrey Bles, 1957
- Will to Survive, Geoffrey Bles, 1958
- There Was a Witness, Geoffrey Bles, 1960
- The Voice of the Peacock, Geoffrey Bles, 1962
- Once Upon a Tombstone, Geoffrey Bles, 1965
