= Virginia Coffman =

American writer

- Born: July 30, 1914; San Francisco, California, U.S.
- Died: March 31, 2005; Reno, Nevada, U.S.
- Other names: Jeanne Duval, Ann Stanfield, Kay Cameron
- Occupation: Writer

Virginia Edith Coffman (July 30, 1914 – March 31, 2005) was an American writer. She published over 100 gothic romance novels in her career.

== Early life and education ==
Virginia Edith Coffman was born in San Francisco, the daughter of William E. Coffman and Edythe Duval Coffman. She grew up in Long Beach, California. She graduated from the University of California, Berkeley, in 1938. But she cited another important early influence on her work: "The greatest influence on my writing is due to the public libraries," she explained in 1959.

== Career ==
Coffman was an actress as a young woman, and worked in Hollywood as a secretary and a script editor, for David O. Selznick, Monogram Pictures, Hal Roach, and Howard Hughes. She wrote screenplays for television and film. Following her work in the film industry, she moved to Reno, Nevada, where she wrote and worked as a secretary in a bank and in a realtor's office. Coffman was active in the Reno chapter of American PenWomen, and was inducted into the Nevada Writers Hall of Fame in 1990.

Coffman published at least 109 books, most of them gothic romance novels with historical settings. Her first novel was Moura (1959), which became the first of a five-book series. Her books include "generous helpings of steamy sex", to satisfy publishers' and readers' demands. "There's a lot of horror in my books, and more sex than there used to be," she told an interviewer in 1981. She published under at least four pseudonyms, including Jeanne Duval, Kay Cameron, and Ann Stanfield. Roberts argues that Coffman's fiction combines elements of Gothic fiction, detective fiction, and historical romance.

== Books ==
- Moura (1959)
- Affair at Alkali (1960)
- Curse of the Island Pool (1965)
- Black Heather (1966)
- A Few Fiends to Tea (1967, 1990)
- The Mist at Darkness (1968)
- The Vicar of Moura
- The Vampyre of Moura
- The High Terrace
- Black Heather
- Night at Sea Abbey
- Of Love and Intrigue
- The Chinese Door
- The Lombard Heiress
- The Lombard Cavalcade
- Passion's Rebel (as Kay Cameron)
- The Lady Serena (1978, as Jeanne Duval)
- The Orchid Tree
- Veronique
- The Tangerine Pool
- Devil Vicar
- The Demon Tower
- The Beckoning
- Marsanne
- The Jeweled Darkness
- Mistress Devon
- Castle Barra
- Call of the Flesh
- The Guru and the Sex Goddess
- The Dark Palazzo (1981)
- Dark Desire (1990)

== Personal life ==
Coffman lived with her sister Donnie Coffman Micciche, a singer, actress, writer, and artist, in their later years. Coffman died in Reno on March 31, 2005.
