= Rona Randall =

British writer

Rona Green Shambrook
- Born: Rona Green; 16 June 1911; Birkenhead, Cheshire, England
- Occupation: Novelist
- Spouse: Frederick Walter Shambrook
- Children: 1
- Writing career
- Pen name: Rona Randall, Rona Shambrook, Virginia Standage
- Language: English
- Period: 1942–2001
- Genres: Gothic, romance
- Notable awards: RoNA Award

Rona Shambrook, née Green (born 16 June 1911, date of death unknown), was a British writer of over 50 gothic and romance novels, and some non-fiction books, under the pseudonym of Rona Randall from 1942 to 2001. She also used her married name Rona Shambrook and the pseudonym of Virginia Standage. In 1970, her novel Broken Tapestry won the Romantic Novel of the Year Awardfrom the Romantic Novelists' Association.

== Biography ==
Shambrook was born in Birkenhead, Cheshire, England Her education includes Pitmans College in London, a Diploma in English literature at Royal Society of Art, Birkenhead School of Art Literary. In 1938, she married Frederick Walter Shambrook. She had a son.

A former actress, before writing she worked also as journalist and sub-director of the publishing company Amalgamated Press, and as assistant editor of George Newnes Ltd. Published since 1942, she started publishing mainly contemporary doctor-nurse romances, before writing also gothic romances and, when the market for gothic novels softened, historical mystery romances. In 1970, Broken Tapestry, her contemporary novel about a broken family, won the Romantic Novelists' Association's Romantic Novel of the Year Award. In 1989, she wrote The Model Wife: Nineteenth Century Style, a book about social constumbres, including clothing. In 1992, she wrote Writing Popular Fiction, a complete guide for writers.

== Bibliography ==
=== As Rona Randall ===
==== Single novels ====
- The Moon Returns (1942)
- Doctor Havelock's Wife (1943)
- Rebel Wife (1944)
- The Late Mrs. Lane (1945)
- That Girl, Jennifer! (1946)
- The Howards of Saxondale (1946)
- The Fleeting Hour (1947)
- She Married a Doctor (1947) aka I Married a Doctor aka The Doctor Takes a Wife
- The Street of the Singing Fountain (1948)
- Shadows on the Sand (1949)
- Delayed Harvest (1950)
- Young Dr. Kenway (1950)
- The Island Doctor (1951)
- Bright Morning (1952)
- Girls in White (1953)
- Young Sir Galahad (1953)
- Journey to Love (1953) aka Journey to Arcady
- Faith, Hope and Charity (1954) aka Sisters in Nursing aka Lab Nurse
- The Merry Andrews (1954)
- Desert Flower (1955)
- A Girl Called Ann (1956)
- Leap in the Dark (1956)
- Runaway from Love (1956)
- The Cedar Tree (1957)
- Nurse Stacey Comes Aboard (1958)
- The Doctor Falls in Love (1958)
- Dancing Cinderella (1959)
- Love and Dr. Maynard (1959)
- Enchanted Eden (1960)
- Sister at Sea (1960)
- Girl in Love (1961)
- Hotel de Luxe (1961)
- House Surgeon at Luke's (19)
- Walk Into My Parlour (1962) aka Lyonhurst
- Murmuring Willow (1962) aka The Willow Herb
- Seven Days from Midnight (1965)
- The Arrogant Duke (1966)
- Knight's Keep (1967)
- Broken Tapestry (1969)
- The Witching Hour (1970)
- Silent Thunder (1971) aka Mountain of Fear
- The Midnight Walker (1973) aka Glenrannoch
- Dragonmede (1974)
- The Watchman's Stone (1975)
- The Eagle at the Gate (1978)
- The Mating Dance (1979)
- The Ladies of Hanover Square (1981)
- Curtain Call (1983)
- The Frozen Ceiling (1999)
- The Tower Room (2001)

==== Potters Saga ====
1. The Drayton Legacy (1986)
2. The Potter's Niece (1987)
3. The Rival Potters (1990)

==== Non-fiction ====
- Jordan and the Holy Land (1968)
- The Model Wife: Nineteenth Century Style (1989)
- Writing Popular Fiction (1992)

=== As Rona Shambrook ===
==== Single novels ====
- The Silver Cord (1963)

=== As Virginia Standage ===
==== Single novels ====
- Golden Rebel (1981)
