= Dorothy Eden =

New Zealand writer (1912–1982)

Dorothy Enid Eden (3 April 1912 – 4 March 1982) was a New Zealand novelist and short story writer, principally in the Gothic genre.

== Early life ==
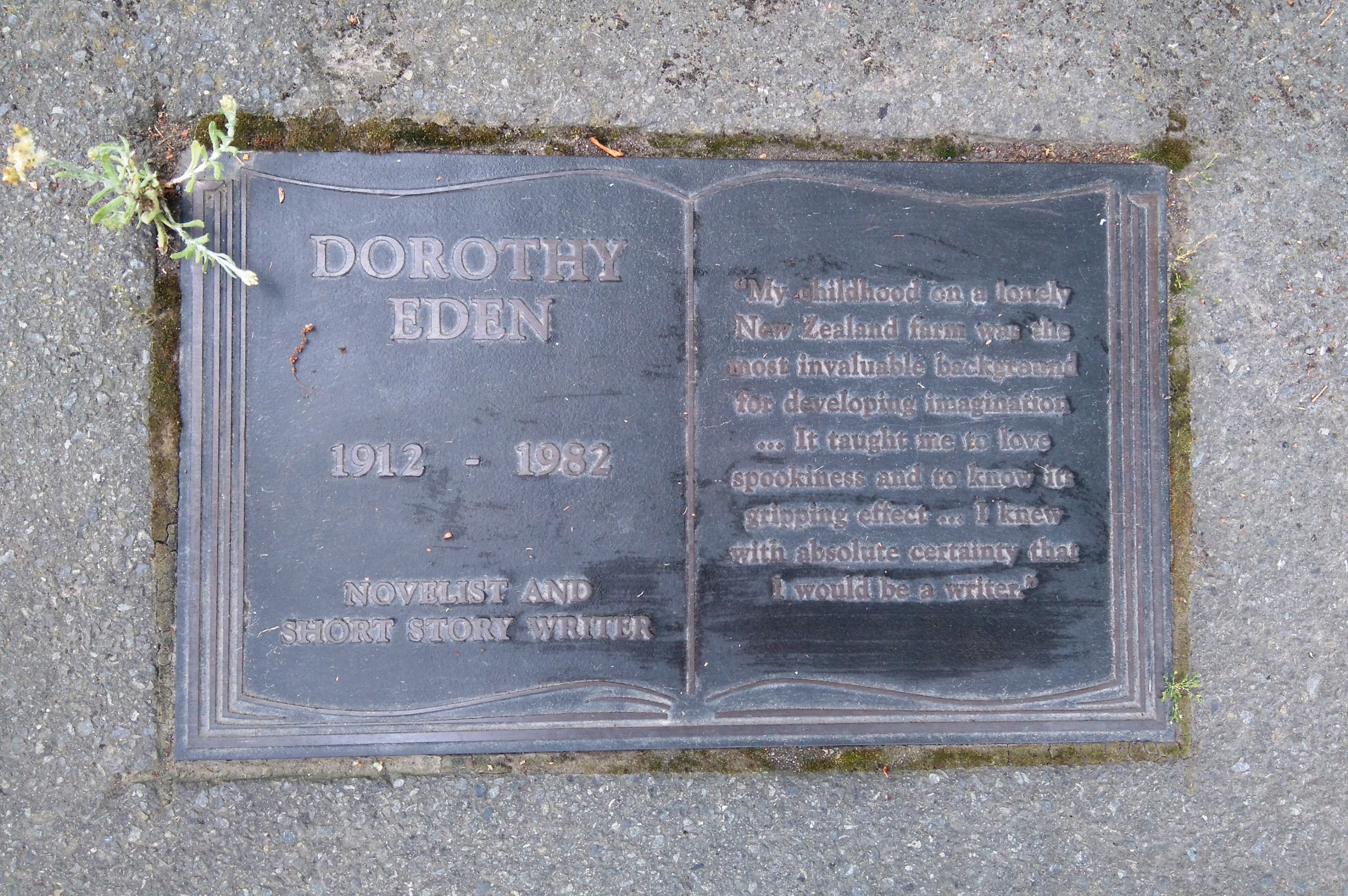
Plaque commemorating Dorothy Eden outside 315 Montreal St, Christchurch

Eden was born in North Canterbury but she grew up in the area of Elgin and Wakanui, near Ashburton. She was educated in Wakanui and at Ashburton Technical School leaving school at 16 to work as a typist and legal secretary in Ashburton and Christchurch. In the 1954 New Zealand electoral roll (on Ancestry) she was listed as residing at 315 Montreal St, Christchurch.

== Career ==
Eden's first novel was published in 1940 and she became a full-time writer in 1946. In 1954 she moved to England; she made the move "to prove she could write".

In 1980 Eden was described as one of the 10 best-selling novelists in the world. She was best known for her writings in the suspense and Gothic genres, both romances and thrillers. Her works were translated into many different languages including Turkish, Icelandic and Hebrew. In addition to writing novels, she also contributed to magazines, including New Zealand Mirror and other international magazines. She served on the committee of the English Crime Writers Association.

Eden's historical novel Sleep in the Woods was set in Taranaki during the New Zealand Wars. It was a story of conflict between settlers and Māori and the elimination of social and class distinctions in the English and Scottish settlers. Once she moved to England most of her novels were set in England or Europe in various settings: Victorian England, Ireland at the time of the affair of Parnell and Kitty O'Shea, Mafeking and Peking during the Boxer rebellion, New South Wales in the pioneer days, Denmark, Italy and Scandinavia. Her writing also focused on gender relations.

After treatment for breast cancer Eden helped to fundraise towards the operation of a scanner at Charing Cross Hospital, Hammersmith. She died of cancer in London in 1982.

== Publications ==
=== Writing as Dorothy Eden ===
- The Singing Shadows (1940)
- The Laughing Ghost (1943)
- We Are for the Dark (1944)
- The Schoolmaster's Daughter (aka The Daughters of Ardmore Hall) (1946)
- Summer Sunday (1946)
- Walk into My Parlour (1947)
- Crow Hollow (1950)
- Voice of the Dolls (1950)
- Cat's Prey (aka Let Us Prey) (1952)
- Lamb to the Slaughter (1953)
- Bride by Candlelight (1954)
- Darling Clementine (1955)
- Night of the Letter (1955)
- Death Is a Red Rose (1956)
- The Pretty Ones (1957)
- Listen to Danger (1958)
- The Deadly Travellers (1959)
- The Sleeping Bride (1959)
- An Afternoon Walk (1960)
- Samantha (aka Lady of Mallow) (1960)
- Sleep in the Woods (1960)
- Afternoon for Lizards (aka Bridge of Fear) (1961)
- Whistle for the Crows (1962)
- The Bird in the Chimney (aka Darkwater) (1963)
- Bella (aka Ravenscroft) (1964)
- The Marriage Chest (1965)
- Never Call It Loving (1966)
- Siege in the Sun (1967)
- Winterwood (1967)
- The Shadow Wife (1968)
- Yellow Is for Fear, and other stories (1968)
- The Vines of Yarrabee (1969)
- Melbury Square (1970)
- Waiting for Willa (1970)
- Speak to Me of Love (1972)
- The Millionaire's Daughter (1974)
- The Time of the Dragon (1975)
- The House on Hay Hill, and other romantic fiction (1976)
- The Salamanca Drum (1977)
- The Storrington Papers (1978)
- The American Heiress (1980)
- An Important Family (1982)

=== Writing as Mary Paradise ===
- Face of an Angel (1961)
- Shadow of a Witch (1962)
