= The Convenient Marriage =

1934 novel by Georgette Heyer

- First edition
- Author: Georgette Heyer
- Language: English
- Genre: Georgian, Romance
- Set in: 1776
- Publisher: William Heinemann
- Publication date: 1934
- Publication place: United Kingdom
- Media type: Print (hardback & paperback)
- Pages: 288 pp

The Convenient Marriage is a Georgian romance novel by Georgette Heyer published in 1934. The novel is set in 1776 and concerns the relationship between Horatia Winwood and Marcus, Lord Drelincourt, the Earl of Rule. It is the first of several Heyer romances where the hero and heroine are married early in the novel, and the plot follows their path to mutual love and understanding. Later examples include Friday's Child and April Lady.

== Plot summary ==
When, at the age of 35, the wealthy Earl of Rule proposes for the hand of Elizabeth Winwood, she resigns herself to marrying in order to rescue the fortunes of her family, impoverished by gambling. Her youngest sister, stammering 17-year-old Horatia, takes matters into her own hands, naively meeting with the Earl and persuading him to marry her instead, thus leaving Elizabeth free to marry her true love, Edward Heron. Part of the arrangement she proposes to Rule is that it will be a marriage of convenience in which neither will interfere with each other's activities.

The wedding takes place and, as tacitly agreed, the Earl continues his association with his mistress, Lady Caroline Massey. Meanwhile, Horatia quickly becomes a popular and fashionable society wife, spending vast amounts on sensational outfits and at gambling on cards.The Earl is also obliged to make regular financial donations to support Horatia's debt-ridden brother, Pelham.

Later Horatia meets and befriends Lord Robert Lethbridge, who is secretly seeking revenge on Rule for his role in thwarting Lethbridge's attempt several years earlier to elope with the Earl's sister, Lady Louisa. Rule warns Horatia against continuing her friendship with Lethbridge but, when the Earl declines to explain why, Horatia disregards him, resenting her husband's continued association with Lady Caroline and wanting to teach Rule a lesson.

Horatia goes with Lord Lethbridge to a masked ball that the Earl had forbidden her from attending. There she attempts to persuade the expert Lethbridge into playing cards with her and he proposes that they play for a lock of her hair. Before the game can start, Rule manages to pitch Lord Robert into an ornamental pool and dresses himself in Lethbridge's mask and domino. Horatia now returns from repairing a rip in her dress and the two begin the game without her guessing who her new opponent is. Horatia is badly beaten and comes to realise the inappropriateness of her actions. When Rule continues the masquerade by stealing a kiss as he snips off her hair, Horatia rushes out in fury and bumps into Lady Massey, who is at the same ball.

The next day Horatia confesses what happened to Rule and promises to end her friendship with Lethbridge. Rule, who has all along been in love with his young wife, now breaks off his relationship with Lady Massey, but without telling Horatia. When the Earl leaves town to see to business on his country estate at Meering, he is disappointed by Horatia's resentful decision to remain in London. But though Horatia fills her days with all her former entertainments, she cannot distract herself from the loneliness she feels in her husband's absence. When she leaves a ball early, Lord Lethbridge arranges to kidnap her to his own house, intending to ruin her and so gain his revenge on Rule. Horatia knocks him out with a poker but in the process she loses a very distinctive brooch from the Earl's heirloom set of jewels.

Horatia asks her brother Pelham and his friend, Mr Pommeroy, to restore the brooch to her before Rule returns from his estate. However, Rule's jealous cousin, Mr Drelincourt, has already discovered the brooch at Lethbridge's house and has left for Meering to share this news. Lethbridge overtakes Drelincourt on the road and wrests the brooch from him. Though Drelincourt continues on to the Earl's, Rule is furious at his cousin's insinuation that Horatia and Lethbridge are having an affair. Next day Rule sets off back to London. He encounters Lethbridge at an inn on the way and the two have a sword fight, which Rule wins, wounding his opponent. Meanwhile, Pelham, accompanied by Pommeroy and Heron, plan to hold up Lethbridge's carriage disguised as highwaymen but accidentally hold up Rule's carriage instead.

Horatia, learning that Pelham has not recovered her brooch, is miserable and constrained with her husband, who has told her nothing on his return. Receiving an anonymous note saying that her brooch will be restored if she attends Vauxhall Gardens pavilion at midnight, the anxious Horatia is relieved when it is the Earl who arrives with the brooch. Casting aside their former constraint, they confess their true feelings for each other.

== Characters in conversation ==
While she was working on The Convenient Marriage, the author sent a "Dramatis personae" of its main characters to her agent, L. P. Moore, in the course of their correspondence:

Marcus Drelincourt, Earl of Rule. Hero of the best type. Very pansy, but full of guts under a lazy exterior. Aged 35.
Elizabeth Winwood, lady in the best XVIIIth cent. tradition. Sweet & willowy. Age 20
Charlotte Winwood. Improving spinster. 19
Horatia Winwood. A stammering heroine, of the naive & incorrigible variety. 17
Pelham, Viscount Winwood. Brother to above ladies. Young rake & spendthrift. Provides light relief.
Maria, Viscountess Winwood. Mother to all the above Winwoods. An invalid of exquisite sensibility.
Edward Heron. Lieutenant of the 10th Foot, invalided home from the Battle of Bunker Hill. Enamoured of Elizabeth.
Louisa, Lady Quain. Trenchant sister to Rule.
Sir Humphrey Quain. Her husband.
Arnold Gisborne. Secretary to the Earl of Rule.
Caroline, Lady Massey. I regret to say, Rule's discarded mistress.
Crosby Drelincourt. Cousin & heir presumptive to the Earl of Rule. A Macaroni, & a nasty piece of work, taken all round.
Robert, Baron Lethbridge. Best type of villain. Fierce & hot-eyed & sardonic.

According to Heyer's biographer Jennifer Kloester, the creation of such cast lists often served as the starting point in plotting her novels. Once she had established a suitably named character, she found it easy to create their individual voices and move the action forward through their lively dialogue and interaction. With that aid, Heyer then went on to speculate on the kind of stock situations in which they would become involved, even before the story line was well established. So, on the basis of the list above, Heyer speculated in her correspondence with Moore, "All these people are naturally going to fall into a number of awkward situations, & I rather think Pelham has a duel with friend Crosby, while I am quite sure that Rule has one with Lethbridge. Lots of gambling. Horatia is a gambler, & I should imagine will get herself into a fairly sticky mess over it. But don't you fret—it will all End Happily". Certainly Heyer's return to similar stock situations later in her career led to A.S. Byatt's accusation that April Lady (1957) was no more than "a rehash of the earlier Convenient Marriage".
