= K244 =

K244, K-244, K 244, K.244 or other variants may refer to:

- HMCS Charlottetown (K244) (Flower class corvette), a former Canadian Navy ship
- HMCS Charlottetown (K244) (River class frigate), a former Canadian Navy ship
- K-244 (Kansas highway), a state highway in Kansas
- K-244: Church Sonata in F, see Köchel catalogue
- Station K244: Suwon Station on the Bundang Line
- Ace Books K244, The Gothic Reader, see List of Ace titles in K series
