= List of Ace titles in K series =

Ace Books published its K series of books starting in 1959 and continuing to about 1968. The K series was priced originally at 35 cents, and later at 50 cents.

Some titles are missing from this list, and may not exist. The missing serial numbers are 130, 131, 135, 165, 186, 253, 256, 270, 274, and 302. There appear to be two books with number K-228, according to book listings; neither has been seen for this article.

- K-101 NA Charles Francis Potter The Faith Men Live By (1959)
- K-102 NA Richard E. Byrd Alone
- K-103 NA Prudencio de Pereda Fiesta
- K-104 NA W.A. Swanberg Sickles the Incredible
- K-105 NA Alfred Duggan Winter Quarters
- K-106 NA Allen Churchill The Improper Bohemians
- K-107 WE Hugh B. Cave The Cross On The Drum (1959)
- K-108 NA Don Robertson Three Days
- K-109 NA Dalton Trumbo Johnny Got His Gun (1959)
- K-110 NA Kirst The Seventh Day (1959)
- K-111 NA Robert Sproul The Cracked Reader (1960)
- K-112 NA Les Savage, Jr. The Royal City (1960)
- K-113 NA Eric Duthie Tall Short Stories (1960)
- K-114 NA O. A. Bushnell Peril in Paradise
- K-115 NA A. A. Hoehling They Sailed Into Oblivion
- K-116 NA Elliot West Man Running (1960)
- K-117 NA Frank Edward Stranger Than Science (1960)
- K-118 NA Alfred Duggan Children Of The Wolf (1959)
- K-119 NA Ralph Ginzburg Erotica
- K-120 NA J. Haslip Lucrezia Borgia
- K-121 NA Robert C. Ruark Grenadine Etching - Her Life and Loves (1960)
- K-122 NA Kurt Singer (ed.) Spies Who Changed History
- K-123 NA Richard B. Erno The Hunt
- K-124 NA Peter Freuchen Eskimo
- K-125 NA Harold Mehling Scandalous Scamps
- K-126 NA Robert Dahl Breakdown (1960)
- K-127 NA George Stewart Fire
- K-128 NA Clellan S. Ford and Frank A. Beach Patterns of Sexual Behavior
- K-129 NA Alfred Duggan Conscience Of The King
- K-132 NA Harnett T. Kane Spies for the Blue and Gray
- K-133 NA Don Berry Trask: The Coast of Oregon, 1848
- K-134 NA Peter Fleming Operation Sea Lion
- K-136 NA C. D. MacDougall Hoaxes
- K-137 NA George Bluestone The Private World Of Cully Powers (1960)
- K-138 NA George R. Stewart Ordeal By Hunger (1960)
- K-139 NA Alfred Duggan Three's Company (1961)
- K-140 NA Harry R. Litchfield Your Child's Care
- K-141 NA Emil Ludwig Michelangelo and Rembrandt: Selections From Three Titans
- K-142 NA Brant House (ed.) Crimes That Shocked America (1961)
- K-143 NA Willa Gibbs The Twelfth Physician (1961)
- K-144 NA Frank Edwards Strangest Of All (1962)
- K-145 NA Harry F. Tashman The Marriage Bed
- K-146 NA Rowena Farre Seal Morning
- K-147 NA Carl J. Spinatelli Baton Sinister (1959)
- K-148 NA Herbert Asbury The Chicago Underworld
- K-149 NA Talbot Mundy Queen Cleopatra (1962)
- K-150 NA Patricia Robins Lady Chatterley's Daughter (1962)
- K-151 NA Pierce G. Fredericks The Great Adventure
- K-152 NA Brant House (ed.) Great Trials Of Famous Lawyers (1962)
- K-153 NA Rebecca Liswood A Marriage Doctor Speaks Her Mind About Sex
- K-154 SF George R. Stewart Earth Abides (1962)
- K-155 NA Thomas R. Henry The Strangest Things In The World
- K-156 NA Charles Fort The Book Of The Damned
- K-157 NA E. H. G. Lutz Miracles of Modern Surgery
- K-158 NA Phyllis A. Whitney Thunder Heights
- K-159 NA Theodora DuBois Captive of Rome
- K-160 NA Guy Endore The Werewolf of Paris
- K-161 NA Frederick L. Collins The FBI In Peace And War
- K-162 NA Richard O'Connor Gould's Millions
- K-163 NA Rupert Furneaux Worlds Strangest Mysteries (1962)
- K-164 NA Phyllis A. Whitney The Trembling Hills
- K-166 NA Shirley Jackson The Sundial
- K-167 NA Karen Blixen (as Pierre Andrezel) The Angelic Avengers
- K-168 NA R. Dewitt Miller Stranger Than Life (1962)
- K-169 NA Scott Sullivan The Shortest Gladdest Years
- K-170 NA John J. Pugh High Carnival (1962)
- K-171 NA Dorothy Eden Lady of Mallow (1963)
- K-172 NA Peter Bourne The Golden Pagans
- K-173 NA Dorothea Malm To The Castle
- K-174 NA Georgette Heyer The Grand Sophy
- K-175 NA Virginia Coffman Moura (1963)
- K-176 NA Brant House Strange Powers of Unusual People
- K-177 NA Anya Seton My Theodosia
- K-178 NA Phyllis A. Whitney The Quicksilver Pool
- K-179 NA Georgette Heyer Venetia
- K-180 NA Margaret Lynn To See A Stranger
- K-181 NA Margaret Summerton The Sea House
- K-182 NA Doris Webster and Mary A. Hopkins Instant Self-Analysis
- K-183 NA Phyllis Bentley The House of Moreys
- K-184 NA Dorothy Eden Whistle For The Crows
- K-185 NA Shirley Jackson Hangsaman
- K-187 NA Henry Bellamann Victoria Grandolet
- K-188 NA Richard E. Byrd Alone
- K-189 NA Dorothy Cameron Disney The Hangman's Tree (1963)
- K-190 NA Jim Egleson and Janet Frank Egleson Parents Without Partners
- K-191 NA Anne Buxton (as Anne Maybury) The Brides Of Bellenmore (1963)
- K-192 NA Sheila Bishop The House With Two Faces (1964)
- K-193 NA Franklin S. Klaf and Bernhardt J. Hurwood A Psychiatrist Looks At Erotica
- K-194 NA Margaret Summerton Nightingale At Noon (1964)
- K-195 NA Michael Avallone (as Edwina Noone) Dark Cypress
- K-196 NA Joseph Sidney Karnake and Victor Boesen Navy Diver
- K-197 NA Doris Miles Disney Who Rides a Tiger
- K-198 NA Josephine Bell Stranger On A Cliff (1964)
- K-199 NA Barbara O'Brien Operators And Things (1958)
- K-200 NA J. L. Whitney The Whisper of Shadows
- K-201 NA Georgette Heyer April Lady (1964)
- K-202 NA William Burroughs Junkie (1964)
- K-203 NA Jan Hillard Morgan's Castle
- K-204 NA Robert Payne Charlie Chapin: The Great God Pan (1964)
- K-205 NA Ruth Willock The Night of the Visitor
- K-206 NA Frank Edwards Strange World (1964)
- K-207 NA Lady Eleanor Smith A Dark And Splendid Passion
- K-208 NA Nicole Maxwell The Jungle Search for Nature's Cures (1964)
- K-209 NA Aileen Seilaz The Veil of Silence (1965)
- K-210 NA Hans Holzer Ghost Hunter
- K-211 NA Anne Buxton (as Anne Maybury) The Pavilion At Monkshood (1965)
- K-212 NA Sheila Bishop The Durable Fire
- K-213 NA Michael Avallone (as Edwina Noone) Dark Cypress (1965)
- K-215 NA Rohan O'Grady The Master of Montrolfe Hall
- K-216 NA Jan Roffman The Reflection of Evil
- K-217 NA Charles Fort Lo!
- K-218 NA Ross Santee Cowboy
- K-219 NA Joan Aiken The Silence Of Herondale
- K-220 NA Susan Howatch The Dark Shore
- K-221 NA Virginia Coffman The Beckoning
- K-222 NA John Macklin Strange Destinies
- K-223 NA Michael Avallone (as Edwinna Noone) Corridor Of Whispers
- K-224 NA Brant House Strange Powers of Unusual People
- K-225 NA Michael Avallone The Summer of Evil
- K-226 NA Georgette Heyer Sylvester
- K-227 NA Anne Buxton (as Anne Maybury) Green Fire
- K-228 NA Robb Stewart Strange Prophecies That Came True
- K-228 NA Joan Winslow Griffin Towers
- K-229 NA R. DeWitt Miller Impossible: Yet It Happened!
- K-230 NA Dorothy Eden The Pretty Ones
- K-231 NA Lane Peters Promise Him Anything
- K-232 NA Anne Buxton (as Anne Maybury) The House of Fand
- K-233 NA Patricia Robins Lady Chatterley's Daughter
- K-234 NA Virginia Coffman The Devil Vicar
- K-235 NA Georgette Heyer Sprig Muslin
- K-236 NA Dorothy Eden Bridge of Fear
- K-237 NA Robert Tralins Strange Events Beyond Human Understanding
- K-238 NA Anne Buxton (as Anne Maybury) Someone Waiting
- K-239 NA Dorothy Eden The Sleeping Bride
- K-240 NA Susan Howatch The Waiting Sands
- K-241 NA Brad Steiger Strange Guests
- K-242 NA Ruth Comfort Mitchell The Legend of Susan Dane
- K-243 NA Dorothy Eden The Deadly Travellers
- K-244 NA Kurt Singer (ed.) The Gothic Reader
- K-245 NA Marie Garratt Dangerous Enchantment
- K-246 NA Joan Grant Castle Cloud
- K-247 WE Francis H. Ames That Callahan Spunk! (1965)
- K-248 NA Anne Buxton (as Anne Maybury) Whisper in the Dark
- K-249 NA Dorothy Eden The Brooding Lake (1966)
- K-250 NA Dr. Webb B. Garrison Strange Bonds Between Animals And Men
- K-251 NA Anne Buxton (as Anne Maybury) Shadow Of A Stranger
- K-252 NA Phyllis A. Whitney The Trembling Hills
- K-254 NA Rupert Furneaux The World's Strangest Mysteries
- K-255 NA R. DeWitt Miller Impossible: Yet It Happened! (1966)
- K-257 NA Anne Buxton (as Anne Maybury) I Am Gabriella!
- K-258 NA Barbara Blackburn City of Forever (1966)
- K-259 NA Michael Harvey Strange Happenings
- K-260 NA Joan Rich and Leslie Rich Dating and Mating By Computer (1966)
- K-261 NA Dorothy Eden Night of the Letter (1967)
- K-262 NA Rona Shambrook (as Rona Randall) Walk Into My Parlor (1966)
- K-263 NA Anne Buxton (as Anne Maybury) The Night My Enemy (1967)
- K-264 NA Jane Blackmore The Dark Between The Stars (1967)
- K-265 NA Georgette Heyer The Reluctant Widow (1967)
- K-266 NA Thomas R. Henry The Strangest Things in the World (1967)
- K-267 NA Dorothy Eden Listen To Danger (1967)
- K-268 NA Brad Steiger Treasure Hunting
- K-269 NA Rona Shambrook (as Rona Randall) Seven Days From Midnight
- K-271 NA Anne Buxton (as Anne Maybury) Falcon's Shadow
- K-272 NA Hans Holzer Yankee Ghosts (1966)
- K-273 NA Rona Shambrook (as Rona Randall) The Willow Herb (1967)
- K-275 NA Dorothy Eden Crow Hollow (1967)
- K-276 NA Bernhardt J. Hurwood Strange Talents (1967)
- K-277 NA Anne Maybury Stay Until Tomorrow (1961)
- K-278 NA Helen Arvonen Circle of Death
- K-279 NA Anonymous The Strange And Uncanny
- K-280 NA Susan Howatch Call in the Night (1967)
- K-281 NA Margaret Wetherby Williams (Margaret Erskine) No. 9 Belmont Square (1967)
- K-282 NA Anne Buxton (as Anne Maybury) The Winds of Night
- K-283 NA Nancy Buckingham Cloud Over Malverton (1967)
- K-284 NA Monica Dickens The Room Upstairs
- K-285 NA Rona Shambrook (as Rona Randall) Hotel Deluxe
- K-286 NA Nancy Buckingham The Hour Before Moonrise
- K-287 NA Margaret Wetherby Williams (as Margaret Erskine) Old Mrs. Ommanney is Dead
- K-288 NA Robb Stewart Strange Prophecies That Came True (1967)
- K-289 NA Jane Blackmore Night Of The Stranger (1967)
- K-290 NA Jan Roffman Ashes In An Urn (1966)
- K-291 NA Brad Steiger We Have Lived Before (1967)
- K-292 NA John Macklin The Enigma of the Unknown (1967)
- K-293 NA Elizabeth Ford Dangerous Holiday (1967)
- K-294 NA Joan Aiken Beware of the Bouquet (1967)
- K-295 NA Margaret Wetherby Williams (as Margaret Erskine) The Woman At Belguardo (1967)
- K-296 NA Warren Smith Strange Powers Of The Mind
- K-297 NA Nancy Buckingham The Dark Summer (1968)
- K-298 NA Rona Shambrook (as Rona Randall) The Silver Cord
- K-299 NA Rae Folly Fear of a Stranger
- K-300 NA Michael Hervey They Walk By Night
- K-301 NA Dorothy Eden The Laughing Ghost
- K-303 NA Jane Blackmore Beware The Night (1967)
- K-304 NA Margaret Wetherby Williams (as Margaret Erskine) The Family At Tannerton (1967)
- K-305 NA John Macklin Strange Encounters (1968)
- K-306 NA Susan Howatch The Shrouded Walls (1968)
- K-307 NA Brad Steiger The Occult World Of John Pendragon (1968)
