= These Old Shades =

1926 novel by Georgette Heyer

- 1927 edition (with same cover as first edition)
- Author: Georgette Heyer
- Cover artist: S.G. Hulme Beaman
- Language: English
- Genre: Georgian, Romance
- Publisher: William Heinemann
- Publication date: 1926
- Publication place: United Kingdom
- Media type: Print (hardback & paperback)
- Pages: 352 pp
- Preceded by: The Black Moth
- Followed by: Devil's Cub

These Old Shades is a 1926 historical romance written by British novelist Georgette Heyer. The novel is set around 1755: Heyer refers to the Duke of Avon's participation in the 1745 uprising as ten years previous; in addition the Prince of Condé is said to be about 20 years old. However, she also refers to Madame de Pompadour as actively involved with Louis XV, whereas her relationship with the King ended at about 1750.

== Plot summary ==
Fortune favours Justin Alastair, the notorious Duke of Avon, casting in his way, one Paris night, the means to revenge himself on his enemy, the Comte de Saint-Vire. Avon literally collides with an abused boy, Léon Bonnard, whose red hair, deep blue eyes and black eyebrows proclaim him a child of the Comte.

Not knowing the exact relationship between the boy and Saint-Vire, Avon purchases him from his brother, a tavern keeper. He takes the boy as his page, and as such can parade the boy throughout French high society, even at a party at Versailles held by Louis XV. The Duke displays Léon before the Comte's wife and his son and heir. He notes the resemblance of the son, Henri, to Léon's brother, Jean Bonnard, a tavern keeper. He also notes that the boy, Léon's age, prefers rural life, and wants to be a farmer. After this excursion to Versailles, the Comte becomes greatly interested in Léon and attempts to purchase him. Meanwhile, both Avon and his friend, Hugh Davenant, have realised that Léon is actually a girl, Léonie. Léonie is wildly devoted to Avon, seeing him as her saviour from a life of abuse, rather than as dissolute and scandalous, as the rest of the fashionable world views him.

The Duke journeys into Champagne, where Léonie grew up, to meet a childhood mentor, the village priest who educated her. This discussion confirms for Avon what he had suspected: Léonie is the legitimate child of the Comte and his wife and was switched at birth with the Bonnard's newborn son, who has been raised as the Comte's heir ever since, as the Comte feared his wife would not bear any other children and he was eager to prevent his younger brother Armand from becoming his heir.

The dissipated Avon has come to care for Léonie so while he continues his scheme of revenge on the Comte, he takes Léonie to England with him where he announces his intention to make her his ward. He teaches her to be a lady, while letting her be known as Léonie de Bonnard. The Comte has become increasingly desperate and kidnaps her and carries her to France. Léonie escapes from him with the help of the Duke's younger brother, Lord Rupert. The party is then joined by Fanny Marling, the Duke's sister, and her husband, Edward Marling.

Once in France, the Duke introduces Léonie into Parisian society, where she makes a big splash. A rumour comes to Léonie's ears that she is the Comte's illegitimate child—the family likeness is very striking. The Comte then persuades Léonie that her illegitimacy is destroying the Duke's reputation, as society views her as his lover. Her distress at this leads her to flee to live with the kindly village priest of her childhood.

This event spurs Avon to complete his revenge. At a large party, he tells the true story of Léonie's life, then embellishes it by adding that she has drowned herself in the Seine. This breaks her mother, whose open grief betrays the Comte's guilt. Knowing he is ruined in society, the Comte shoots himself. His despised brother becomes the new Comte.

Avon reunites with Léonie, they express their true feelings, and they marry.

== Characters ==
- Justin "Satanas" Alastair, Duke of Avon, age approximately 40
- Léon Bonnard, later revealed to be Léonie de Saint-Vire, the Comte's daughter, 19 years old
- Hugh Davenant, the Duke's friend, in his early 30s
- Comte de Saint-Vire
- Henri de Saint-Vire, the Comte's supposed son, approximately 19 years old
- Armand de Saint-Vire, younger brother of the Comte
- Jean Bonnard, a tavern-keeper, Léon's supposed older brother
- Gaston, the Duke's valet
- Walker, the Duke's maître d'hôtel
- Lady Fanny Marling, the Duke's sister
- Mr Edward Marling, Fanny's husband
- Harriet Field, the Duke's cousin, a widow, duenna to Léonie
- Lord Rupert Alastair, the Duke's younger brother

== Sequels ==
The novel's title is taken from Austin Dobson's epilogue poem to his collection of essays Eighteenth Century Vignettes. Devil's Cub (1932) follows These Old Shades with the adventures of Avon's and Léonie's son Dominic, a shockingly selfish and indulged young man who elopes with a poor relation of one of his father's friends. An Infamous Army (1937) completes the family saga with the Duke of Avon's great-granddaughter, Barbara, marrying the hero of An Infamous Army. It is also a sequel to Regency Buck (1935).

These Old Shades was itself originally intended to be a sequel to Heyer's first novel The Black Moth (1921), which would redeem the devilish Belmanoir. But as The Black Moth was a melodrama and a sequel per se would not work in with the plot, she decided to make the new novel stand alone, renamed many characters and made them 'shades' of their former selves.

The Black Moth	These Old Shades
Tracy "Devil" Belmanoir, Duke of Andover	Justin "Satanas" Alastair, Duke of Avon
Lady Lavinia Carstares (née Belmanoir)	Lady Fanny Marling (née Alastair)
The Hon. Richard Carstares	Mr. Edward Marling
John Carstares	John Marling
Lord Andrew Belmanoir	Lord Rupert Alastair
Harriet Fleming (née Belmanoir)	Harriet Field (née Alastair)
Miss Diana Beauleigh	Lady Merivale (née Jennifer Beauchamp)
Jack Carstares, Earl of Wyncham	Anthony, Lord Merivale
Frank Fortescue	Hugh Davenant
Sir John Fortescue	Frederick, Lord Colehatch

== Precedent ==
After These Old Shades became popular despite its release during the 1926 United Kingdom general strike, Heyer determined that publicity was not necessary for good sales, thenceforth refusing to grant interviews. As she told a friend: "My private life concerns no one but myself and my family."
