= An Infamous Army =

1937 novel by Georgette Heyer

- Author: Georgette Heyer
- Language: English
- Genre: Regency, Romance, Historical
- Publisher: William Heinemann
- Publication date: 1937
- Publication place: United Kingdom
- Media type: Print (hardback & paperback)
- Pages: 448 pp
- Preceded by: These Old Shades, Devil's Cub, Regency Buck

An Infamous Army is a historical romance by Georgette Heyer, set during the Waterloo campaign and published in the UK by William Heinemann Ltd in 1937. In the following year it was published in the US by Doubleday.

== Plot summary ==
In the early months of 1815, when invasion by Napoleon seemed an unlikely threat, many of the British aristocracy had rented homes in Brussels. The novel opens in the home of Lord and Lady Worth, where friends are discussing the precarious situation after 'Boney's return to power. Everyone is anxious for the Duke of Wellington to arrive from the Congress of Vienna. When their guests leave, Lady Worth tells her husband of her hopes that his brother, Colonel Charles Audley (who is on Wellington's staff) will fall in love with her new friend, Lucy Devenish.

Amongst the fashionable persons making merry in Brussels, Lady Barbara Childe (granddaughter of the Duke of Avon and a young widow of great beauty and charm) is making her mark, although she is generally regarded as heartless. When Charles finally arrives, he not only falls in love with Barbara ('Bab') but proposes to her and is accepted. Barbara's brother George now arrives in Brussels and attends a party, where Judith, Lady Worth is surprised to see him staring at Lucy Devenish and then announcing that he must pay his respects to her. When Judith questions the two, George explains that they had met several times and that he was worried that Lucy had forgotten him.

In the face of Charles' imperturbability at her behaviour, Bab becomes determined to show just how flirtatious she can be. When he intervenes to extricate one of her victims, they quarrel and she returns his ring. Then, during the Duchess of Richmond's ball, news comes that Napoleon is advancing over the border. The city soon empties of officers, including nearly every young man at the ball. The next day, Barbara goes in search of Charles, desperate to make peace with him, only to learn from Judith that he has left too. On discovering that Barbara's elder brother has fled back to England, Worth takes Barbara in.

Barbara is convinced that Charles has fallen in love with Lucy, until Lucy goes to see Bab to ask her if she has heard anything from her brother George. Lucy then confesses that she and George have been married for nearly a year but that it has been kept secret because their relatives would have disapproved. By now the wounded are starting to arrive in Brussels from the first skirmishes and Judith and Barbara help to nurse them in the street. As the situation becomes more and more desperate, the two women draw close and Judith admits to her husband that she had misjudged both Barbara and Lucy from the start.

The second half of the narrative is devoted to the resistance to Napoleon's invasion by the British, Belgian, Dutch and German allies, culminating in a detailed account of the close-fought and bloody Battle of Waterloo. During the fighting, Charles acts as courier for Wellington and is hit by cannon fire in the final stages, after which his old rival in love, the Comte de Lavisse, delivers the urgent message that Charles was carrying. Back in Brussels, the Duke and Duchess of Avon have arrived, having heard of the scandals that their grandchildren have been making. While they are visiting the Worths, Charles' servant comes to tell the Earl about his master's condition. Worth goes to find him and drive him back to Brussels, promising Bab to take good care of him.

Charles is in danger of his life and has already had his left arm amputated. The surgeons say that they might have to amputate his leg as well, but Worth steps in and stops them from doing so. As Charles regains consciousness, he finds Bab at his bedside; asking her to retrieve the engagement ring from his dressing-table, he places it on her finger "until I give you another in its place". Meanwhile, Wellington, who had previously been to visit Charles and promised to keep him on his staff in future, has returned to his command post and is carrying on business as usual.

== The novel ==
Heyer's original choice of title for her novel was "Forgive, Brave Dead", a phrase she found in Walter Scott's poem "The Field of Waterloo" (1815). Eventually, however, she preferred Wellington's own description of the mixed force of largely untried troops under his command as "an infamous army, very weak and ill-equipped". These were just two by-products of her diligent research into the historical background of the period up to and including the Battle of Waterloo. Among her files were to be found, in addition to notes on her reading, sketches of uniforms and hand-drawn maps, one of which was eventually used by Heinemann as the endpaper to the first edition.

The treatment of Wellington in the novel is not only modelled on contemporary reports; in addition, his conversation is often taken directly from his own letters. Several others among the characters who make a brief appearance are also based on genuine historical figures, including the diarist Thomas Creevey, Peregrine Maitland and the young Lord Hay, who was killed during the battle. Two other characters in the novel, Harry Smith and his young Spanish bride Juana, were discovered in Smith's autobiography, which Heyer also read as part of her preliminary research. But she also found there the idea for her later and equally painstaking novel, The Spanish Bride (1940).

A further level of intertextuality in the novel results from the appearance of characters to be met at earlier stages of their life in the series that begins with the story of Justin and Léonie, Duke and Duchess of Avon: These Old Shades (1926), which is set in 1756; this was followed by Devil's Cub (1932): the story of their son Dominic and his future wife Mary Challoner, set in 1780; and Regency Buck (1935), set in 1811-12. The last of these titles also features slightly younger versions of Lord Worth, his future wife Judith Taverner, Charles Audley and Peregrine Taverner.

Despite the fact that An Infamous Army was a personal favourite of Heyer's, it sold less well than others in the series, although the sale of its serial rights to the Australian Women's Weekly was a sign of her increasing popularity in the Antipodes. The prominent part played by the Battle of Waterloo in the novel also led to a renewal of interest on the 150th anniversary of the battle in 1965. There had been plans to base a film upon the novel for release then, although these were unrealised. However, there were reissues of the title in the US, Germany and Sweden, although in the UK Heinemann had allowed the novel to go out of print. This neglect so disgusted Heyer that she transferred her allegiance to Hodder and Stoughton, who republished An Infamous Army in 1966.

== Reception ==
Soon after An Infamous Army appeared in the UK, it was the novel's historical precision that was singled out for praise. The Times Literary Supplement noted that "details are presented not merely with astonishing care and accuracy – bibliography and maps all complete – [but] the meaning of the opening moves of the campaign is better grasped than in some historical accounts, and there is even a sound criticism of Wellington's strategy." The Daily Mail was also enthusiastic in describing the novel as giving "one of the clearest and most balanced accounts in the English language of the Hundred Days".

The novel was equally admired once it appeared in the US in 1938. The Macon Telegraph called it a "readable and well written account of a great period in history and a charming story". The St. Joseph News-Press praised her depiction of the Battle of Waterloo, writing that Heyer "has breathed reality into the pages of history" and made a "cohesive picture" of "what would ordinarily be a mass of unwieldy detail". The Sacramento Bee also noted of the battle scene that Heyer "handles it with spirit, and a great deal of interest and clarity are achieved with unwieldy material."

There were also impressive responses in military circles. Her description of the fierce fighting at Waterloo was later studied at Sandhurst and acclaimed as the best there is, while across the English Channel a professor of Military Studies at the Belgian Military Academy declared the battle scenes "the nearest to reality that one will ever come without having been there."

== Bibliography ==
- Hodge, J. A. The Private World of Georgette Heyer, Bodley Head, 1984.
- Kloester, Jennifer. Georgette Heyer, William Heinemann, 2011.
