= Friday's Child (novel) =

1944 novel by Georgette Heyer

- First edition
- Author: Georgette Heyer
- Language: English
- Genre: Regency, Romance novel
- Publisher: Heinemann
- Publication date: 1944
- Publication place: United Kingdom
- Media type: Print
- Pages: 312 pp
- OCLC: 179792748
- Dewey Decimal: 823/.912 22
- LC Class: PR6015.E795 F7 2008

Friday's Child is a novel written by Georgette Heyer in 1944. It is generally considered one of Heyer's best Regency romances, and was reportedly the author's personal favorite. Heyer retained only a single fan letter, which was from a Romanian political prisoner who kept herself and her fellow prisoners sane for twelve years by telling and retelling the plot of Friday's Child.

Friday's Child is one of several Heyer romance plots in which the hero and heroine marry early in the novel, following their path to love and understanding. Other examples include The Convenient Marriage and April Lady.

== Plot summary ==
The wild young Viscount Sheringham is fast running through his considerable income through gambling and other extravagant pursuits; and he cannot as yet touch the principal, unless he marries. As the lady with whom he currently fancies himself in love, the beautiful Isabella Milborne, is also an heiress, he proposes.

Isabella rejects him unhesitatingly, citing his dissipated lifestyle. A lively quarrel then follows with his obnoxious widowed mother and her brother, who wish to retain control of his father's fortune themselves. The Viscount storms off in a fit of pique, vowing to marry the first female he meets.

This turns out to be the orphaned and shy Wantage, who has secretly loved him since they were children, and who now lives with one of his neighbours in the rôle of Cinderella, complete with Ugly Sisters.

The rest of the novel, chronicling the Viscount's gradual transition to maturity and the realisation that the one he really loves is Hero (the "loving and giving" child of the title), is told with Miss Heyer's characteristic wit, and features some of her most memorable dialogue, plot twists and characters (such as the fiery but lovelorn George Wrotham, whose hobby is fighting duels).

== Characters in Friday's Child ==
=== Major characters ===
- Anthony Verelst, Viscount Sheringham (Sherry), the hero
- Hero Wantage (Kitten), the heroine
- Gilbert (Gil) Ringwood, Sherry's closest friend
- Hon. Ferdinand (Ferdy) Fakenham, Sherry's cousin and friend
- George, Lord Wrotham /ˈruːtəm/, hot-tempered friend of Sherry and suitor to Isabella Milborne
- Isabella Milborne (the Incomparable), beauty who rejects Sherry

=== Minor characters ===
- Valeria, Lady Sheringham, dowager Viscountess, Sherry's widowed mother
- Horace Paulett, Sherry's maternal uncle and trustee
- Hon. Prosper Verelst, Sherry's paternal uncle and trustee
- the Bagshot family: Mrs Jane Bagshot, Mr Humphrey Bagshot and their children, Edwin, Cassandra (Cassy), Eudora & Sophronia (Sophy); Mrs Bagshot is cousin and guardian to Hero Wantage
- Sir Montagu (Monty) Revesby, friend of Sherry
- Duke of Severn, suitor to Isabella Milborne
- Lady Saltash, grandmother of Gil Ringwood, resident in Bath
- Mr & Mrs Milborne, Isabella's parents
- Hon. Marmaduke (Duke) Fakenham, brother of Ferdy Fakenham
- Lord & Lady Fakenham, Lady Fairford, Ferdy Fakenham's parents and sister
- Jasper Tarleton, Bath gentleman, suitor of Hero
- Ruth Wimborne, cast-off mistress of Sir Montagu Revesby
- Flyaway Nancy, former mistress of Sherry
- Mr Tooting, a Cit, rescuer of Hero
- Mrs Charlotte Gillingham, gaming house proprietress
- Lady (Sally) Royston, female whip
- Mrs Theresa Hoby, Gussie Yarford (Lady Appleby), friends of Hero
- Sir Matthew Brockenhurst (Brock), Sir Barnabas Crawley, Algernon Gumley, Mr Kilby, Assheton Smith, Mr Jack Westgate, Hon. Wilfred Yarford, society gentlemen
- Mrs Drummond Burrell, Lady Jersey, Lady Sefton, society ladies and Patronesses of Almack's Assembly Rooms.
- General Crawley, Sir Carlton Frome, Bath gentlemen
- Mr Chalfont, Misses Chalfont, Bath visitors
- Mr Guynette, Master of Ceremonies at Bath Lower Rooms
- Bootle (Sherry's valet), Bradgate & Mrs Bradgate (butler & cook at Half Moon Street), Chilham (Gil Ringwood's valet), Ditchling (Sheringham servant), Mr Ford (Gil Ringwood's landlord), Goring & Mrs Goring (staff at Sherry's Melton Mowbray hunting box), Groombridge & Mrs Groombridge (butler & cook at Half Moon Street), Jason (Sherry's tiger), John (Sherry's coachman), Maria (Hero's abigail), Mr Philip Stoke (Sheringham man of business), Varley (butler at Sheringham House)
- Pug (Lady Saltash's pug-dog) and a canary
