= Juana María de los Dolores de León Smith =

Spanish noble (1798–1872)

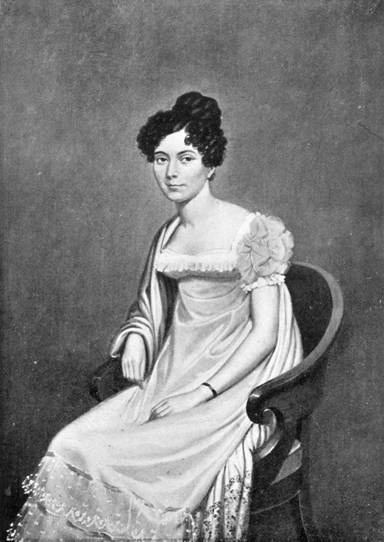
Smith, at the age of 17, painted by an unknown artist in Paris (1815)

Juana María de los Dolores de León, Lady Smith (27 March 1798 – 12 October 1872), was the wife of General Sir Harry Smith, Governor of the Cape Colony.

== Biography ==
Born into an old Spanish noble family, she was a descendant of Juan Ponce de León.

In 1812, at the age of 14, she found herself orphaned and only with a sister, when her hometown Badajoz was besieged for the fourth time during the Peninsular War. After the siege ended in a successful but very bloody storming by the British and Portuguese forces, the sisters sought protection from the chaos of the siege, and chanced upon some British Army officers they found camping outside the city walls. One of them was the then Captain Harry Smith, of the 95th Rifles Regiment, whom she married a few days later.

Instead of letting herself be sent home to her husband's family, she chose to accompany him with the army. She remained with him throughout the rest of the war, accompanying the baggage train, sleeping in the open on the field of battle, riding freely among the troops, and sharing all the privations of campaigning. Her beauty, courage, sound judgment and amiable character endeared her to the officers, including the Duke of Wellington, who spoke of her familiarly as Juanita; and she was idolized by the soldiers.

With the exception of his stint in the War of 1812, she accompanied her husband in all his deployments, most notably in two postings in South Africa, where Sir Harry (he had been knighted in the meantime) served as Governor of Cape Colony and High Commissioner.

She was given a pension of £500 by Parliament on 5 December 1848 in recognition of her husband's services to the country.

Styled Lady Smith after her husband's knighthood, Juana Smith is commemorated directly in the name of Ladysmith, KwaZulu-Natal, South Africa and Ladismith, Western Cape, South Africa, as well as indirectly in the name of Ladysmith, British Columbia, Canada. She also has a road named after her, Ladysmith Avenue, in Whittlesey, England, the town of her husband's birth.

Lady Smith is sometimes said to have introduced the cantaloupe (Cucumis melo cantalupensis) to South Africa, where it is known as spanspek (or spanspec or sponspe(c)k), which in Afrikaans literally means 'Spanish bacon' (Spaanse spek). However, the Oxford English Dictionary shows that the term 'Spanish bacon' had been in use since at least the eighteenth century.

== Representations in fiction ==
Juana Smith and her husband are the central characters in the historic novel The Spanish Bride (published 1940) by Georgette Heyer, which spans the period from just before their meeting after the Battle of Badajoz to the aftermath of the Battle of Waterloo in the latter part of the Napoleonic Wars. The couple also appear at the end of Georgette Heyer's An Infamous Army (published 1937) and are referenced in Sheila Walsh's historical romance novel Improper Acquaintances (published 1984). Juana Smith is also briefly noted in the afterword of Sharpe's Company (published 1982) by Bernard Cornwell.

Although it focuses primarily on her husband, Juana Smith is a central character in the 1984 book The Other Side of the Hill by Peter Luke, which recounts their meeting and first few years of their marriage during the latter part of the Peninsular War and the Waterloo campaign.
