= April Lady =

1957 novel by Georgette Heyer

- First edition
- Author: Georgette Heyer
- Cover artist: Arthur Barbosa
- Language: English
- Genre: Regency, Romance
- Publisher: William Heinemann
- Publication date: 1957
- Publication place: United Kingdom
- Media type: Print (Hardback & Paperback)
- Pages: 268 pp
- Preceded by: Sprig Muslin
- Followed by: Sylvester

April Lady is a Regency romance by Georgette Heyer, published in 1957 by Heinemann in the UK and by Putnam in the US. Previously serialised in the Woman's Journal as “My Lady Cardross”, the new novel was Heyer’s forty-fourth book and her fifteenth Regency novel.

== Plot ==
The story is set in 1813. Helen (Nell) Irvine, daughter of the Earl of Pevensey, has recently been married at the age of 18 to the significantly older Giles Merrion, Earl of Cardross, and has thus rescued her family from the impoverishment brought about by her father's gambling debts and then her brother’s irregular lifestyle. It had really been a love match on both sides, but owing to the stupidity of her mother's advice, Nell has hidden her feelings from him. An added complication is that Cardross has formerly had Lady Orsett as a mistress, a matter which neither feels able to discuss with the other.

Both have incorrigible siblings who complicate their relations. Nell's brother Dysart is a drunken gambler whose wild behaviour places him on the shady side of the law. Nell has secretly lent him more money than was wise and now has difficulty in meeting her own exorbitant expenditure. Also in her household is her husband's half-sister Letitia (Letty), an undisciplined brat utterly spoilt by an over-indulgent upbringing. She has fallen in love with the upright Jeremy Allandale, an aspiring diplomat who is soon to take up a position at the exiled Portuguese court in Brazil. The match has been forbidden by Cardross until Letty is older. She makes Nell her confidant and her extravagant emotions and plans to elope make family life highly uncomfortable.

Relations between husband and wife are further strained by misunderstanding. Nell believes that Cardross has only married her to satisfy convention, while Cardross suspects that Nell accepted him only for his money. This is especially so when bills continue to pile up despite her generous quarterly allowance. Cardross agrees to make a final settlement, but unfortunately Nell discovers another bill that has been overlooked and dare not admit it. Instead she asks Dysart to repay her loan, which he is unable to do. Instead he and his companion Corny Fancot engage in hare-brained schemes to raise the money by other means.

Eventually a jewelled necklace, a family heirloom, disappears and Nell falls under suspicion. In fact it was Letty's doing in an effort to raise funds for an elopement with Allandale. Cardross retrieves the necklace and, when Allandale brings the furious Letty back to Grosvenor Square, gives the couple permission to marry. At the same time Cardross is brought to understand Nell's true affection and he assures her of his.

== A world of language ==
Heyer began writing her novel in 1956, naming it The Necklace in reference to the novel's climax, but she eventually changed this to April Lady owing to her publisher's neutral reception of the proposed title. Jennifer Kloester conjectured in her biography that a Shakespearean reference is intended to the "men are April when they woo" speech in As You Like It. But by Victorian times the phrase "April's lady" had emerged as a metaphor for the feminine half of a romantic pair, as in Algernon Charles Swinburne's lines "If you were April’s lady /and I were lord of May" from his much reprinted poem "A Match". Later in the century the phrase figured as the title of a romantic novel by Margaret Wolfe Hungerford in 1890 and in the form "The April Lady" in a lyric by Helen Taylor (1876 - 1943), set by Helena M. Bland in 1917.

Heyer's own estimate of her novel's story line was delivered in a letter to her friend Patricia Wallace: "This one is going to touch an All Time Low. No, really, it STINKS!" For her it is only saved by its ending, which "incorporates every last one of the characters which are my stock-in-trade, and ends with the sort of absurd scene which (I hope) raises my novels slightly above the Utterly Bloody Standard". Later writers have tended to agree with the author's own doubts. For A. S. Byatt, the situations and characters in April Lady are only "a rehash of the earlier The Convenient Marriage" . And for another commentator, Mari Ness, the sheer volume of carefully researched Regency slang used in the novel has "created a thoroughly artificial world, a world that is not really Regency England, but very much a place of Heyer's imagination".

== Bibliography ==
Kloester, Jennifer. Georgette Heyer, William Heinemann, 2011.
