= The Grand Sophy =

Book by Georgette Heyer

- First edition
- Author: Georgette Heyer
- Language: English
- Genre: Regency, Romance
- Publisher: William Heinemann
- Publication date: 1950
- Publication place: United Kingdom
- Media type: Print (Hardback & Paperback)
- Pages: 336 pp

The Grand Sophy is a Regency romance novel by Georgette Heyer. It was first published in 1950 by Heinemann in the UK and Putnam in the U.S. Sales were brisk. Heinemann reported that in Australia it sold forty thousand copies in its first five months. There was also a Book Club edition in 1951.

== Plot summary ==
For the past several years, Sophia Stanton-Lacy (known as Sophy to everyone) has lived away from England, following her diplomat father Sir Horace around Europe while the Napoleonic Wars raged on. Now that the Battle of Waterloo is won and Napoleon has once again been exiled, her father receives a temporary post in Brazil. Instead of taking his twenty-year-old daughter with him on this occasion, he asks his sister, Lady Ombersley, to watch over his "little Sophy" and help find her a husband. However, "little Sophy" is nothing like anyone expected: 5'9" in her stockings and quite used to getting her own way, with no mother and no governess and after a lifetime of Continental liberty. Outgoing, chic, and quite independent, she takes London by storm with her unconventional manner.

Though most of the Ombersley household take to Sophy, her autocratic cousin, Charles Rivenhall, is wary of the change she represents. Having been raised with a passive, sickly mother and an intemperate, gambling addict father, Charles, now 26 and in receipt of a large inheritance from an uncle, has assumed the role of the adult in the household. Forced by his father's debt to shoulder the family finances, he resents the disruption by his lively and confident cousin of what has become, in all but name, his household. With Charles encouraged in domestic tyranny by his narrow-minded and spiteful fiancée Eugenia Wraxton and her tale-bearing brother Alfred, Sophy and her cousin begin a battle of wills.

Soon after her arrival, Sophy realizes that all is not well in the Rivenhall household and proceeds to solve the various problems of the family with her trademark flair, saving her cousin Hubert from a rapacious moneylender, arranging through an involved scheme her cousin Cecilia's extraction from her infatuation with (and later engagement to) the handsome but talentless poet, Augustus Fawnhope, and promoting her marriage to the eligible Lord Charlbury, the man favoured by her brother and parents and, ultimately, the man Cecilia discovers she loves.

During the period that her father is away in South America, Sophy attracts to herself several would-be suitors: the fortune-hunting Sir Vincent Talgarth, the mollycoddled Lord Bromford and, seemingly, Lord Charlbury himself. Insight into their characters is given when Amabel, the youngest Ombersley girl, catches a dangerous fever. Sophy and Cecilia nurse her through this crisis while Charlbury constantly visits to ask after Amabel’s health. Bromford and Eugenia, by the cautious advice of their respective mothers, stay well clear of the house. As for Sir Vincent, having been refused by Sophy he transfers his attention to Sancia, the Marquesa de Villacañas, Sir Horace’s intended bride, who lives out of town in Merton.

The dénouement comes one tempestuous evening when Sophy prevails on Lord Charlbury to drive her to an isolated house of her father’s, the decayed Lacy Manor. Eugenia calls on the Ombersley household to announce that Sophy has eloped, unaware that Sophy has summoned Sancia to Lacy Manor in order to guard her reputation. The supposed lovers are pursued through the rain by Eugenia and Cecilia, with Lord Bromford on horseback as escort. When Charles, away from home at the time, hears of this, he sets out for Lacy Manor himself, shortly after his uncle has returned home. Sir Horace is regretting his betrothal to Sancia but declines to leave the Ombersley fireside, convinced as he is that Sophy is perfectly capable of solving all complications.

By dint of shooting Charlbury and giving him a flesh wound, the romantic sight of his lordship with his arm in a sling brings Cecilia to acknowledge her love for him, whereupon Fawnhope magnanimously relinquishes her into his care. Brompton has caught a cold and huddles by the fireside with his feet in a mustard bath, tended by Eugenia, who furiously renounces Charles when he ventures to criticize her conduct. This leaves Charles free to embrace Sophy roughly and drag her off into the night, leaving Sancia and her new husband Sir Vincent to cope with the invalids, the abstracted poet and a boxful of escaping ducklings.

== Characters ==
- Sophia (Sophy) Stanton-Lacy
- Sir Horace Stanton-Lacy - Sophy’s father and Lady Ombersley’s brother
- Sancia - a Spanish Marquesa
- Charles Rivenhall
- Elizabeth, Lady Ombersley - Charles’ mother and Sophy’s aunt
- Lord Ombersley - Charles’ father, who spends most of his time at his clubs
- Miss Eugenia Wraxton - Charles' aristocratically horse-faced fiancée
- Alfred Wraxton – Eugenia's gossiping brother
- Cecilia Rivenhall - Charles' sister, 19, a debutante
- Lord Charlbury - 30, Cecilia's admirer
- Augustus Fawnhope – engaged in writing an epic on the Battle of Lepanto
- Hubert Rivenhall - Charles' 21-year-old brother, up at Oxford University
- Theodore Rivenhall – studying at Eton College
- Amabel, Gertrude and Selina Rivenhall - the schoolgirl Rivenhall sisters
- Miss Adderbury - the Rivenhalls' governess
- Dassett - The Rivenhalls' butler
- Lord Bromford - a "prosy bore"
- Sir Vincent Talgarth – a retired army colonel
- Goldhanger - a Jewish moneylender

== Responses ==
The Grand Sophy, set in 1816, puts out a socially mixed message. Its heroine is quick to punish the snobbish Miss Wraxton by scandalously driving her unescorted on an open phaeton past the male haunts of Pall Mall. But while snobbery was "inherent in the social hierarchy" of the periods depicted in Heyer's novels, the author's own prejudices do occasionally surface in her writing too.

One particularly maladroit example occurs in the episode where Sophy confronts the Jewish moneylender Goldhanger, as a result of which some editions have been redacted to omit the passages of racial stereotyping. In this case it cannot be argued that its antisemitic overtones are "just a product of her time" (as they certainly were in the period depicted), since at the time Heyer's novel was written, the Nurenberg trials had just been exposing the criminal consequences of Nazi racism. In extenuation, Jennifer Kloester points out that the portrayal of Goldhanger is more of "a literary caricature…whose antecedents were undoubtedly Dickens's Fagin and Shakespeare's Shylock". In reality Georgette Heyer readily admitted that one of her own grandfathers was Jewish.

Contemporary reviews of the novel commented mainly on its historical faithfulness to the period. For the Chicago Sunday Tribune, "It is no small feat to make Regency London come to life, and to make its characters speak and act as did the people of that time and place, without too much quaintness or strangeness of manner." Patrick Thursfield, in The Times Literary Supplement, goes to the contemporary model of Jane Austen and compares Sophy to Emma Woodhouse for her match-making, although the former is "more successful and enterprising".
