= The Spanish Bride =

1940 historical novel by Georgette Heyer

- First edition
- Author: Georgette Heyer
- Language: English
- Genre: Regency, Romance
- Publisher: William Heinemann
- Publication date: 1940
- Publication place: United Kingdom
- Media type: Print (Hardback & Paperback)
- Pages: 432

The Spanish Bride is a historical novel by English writer Georgette Heyer. Written during 1939, it was published in the UK by Heinemann in April 1940, and in the US by Doubleday in October 1940. Mainly it centres upon the life of Juana Smith, who has married her English husband during the closing years of the Peninsular War.

== Plot ==
After the siege and sack of the Spanish city of Badajoz by British and Portuguese forces in 1812, the convent-raised orphan, Juana and her older sister seek sanctuary among officers of the 95th Rifles in the British camp outside the city walls. From their first encounter, Brigade-Major Harry Smith - shot-proof, fever-proof and already a veteran campaigner at the age of twenty-five - falls deeply in love with fourteen-year-old Juana and, over all objections from his brother officers, marries the girl a few days later. In his beautiful child bride he finds a kindred spirit, and a temper to match, and she soon becomes a firm favourite with the whole army, from the generalissimo down.

Choosing to share with Harry all the difficulties of war on the march, Juana remains at his side throughout, accompanying the baggage train, sleeping in the open on the field of battle, riding freely among the troops, and sharing all the privations of campaigning. After the abdication of Napoleon, Harry takes Juana to live in London and installs her in the house of a refugee French landlady. As Harry spoke fluent Spanish, he had never bothered to teach English to Juana and now engages a tutor for her. But the two, inseparable until then, are parted when Harry is ordered with his regiment to take part in the continuing war with the United States.

During his absence, Harry's family has visited Juana in London and, on his return, she is persuaded to stay with them in Cambridgeshire. In the meantime, Napoleon has escaped from his exile in Elba and Harry is posted to Belgium for the continuation of the war, with Juana insisting on accompanying him. Parted by accident and having been informed that Harry has been killed during the Battle of Waterloo, Juana searches through the horrors of the battlefield for her husband's body. However, the report referred to another officer called Smyth and Juana is finally reunited with the uninjured Harry.

== A work of documentary fiction ==
The Spanish Bride is the last of three closely researched novels written by Heyer in the 1930s: An Infamous Army (1937), focussed on the Battle of Waterloo; Royal Escape (1938), depicting the flight of Charles II following the Battle of Worcester; and finally the more panoramic The Spanish Bride (1940). This last was based in part on the story of the then Brigade-Major Harry Smith and his adolescent wife Juana María de los Dolores de León Smith between 1812-15. But for all that the two central characters are at the centre of the story, they remain subsidiary to the description of contemporary historical events. When the novel was offered for serial publication, it was turned down as "too heavy for readers" and nowadays it figures as low down among the ten least popular of Heyer's novels.

The Peninsular and Napoleonic wars, or the later adventures of veterans from them, play a leading part in several of Heyer's novels written between 1937-1961, but for The Spanish Bride extensive use was made of the portion of Harry Smith's own autobiography covering the years 1812-15 and of fellow officer John Kincaid's diary, even to mirroring actual wording at times. But for all that "where Heyer draws on the historical record, we see Wellington’s troops," it has also been observed that "where she draws on her own imagination (especially for the dialogue), we find the cultural image of the First World War Tommy dressed up in a scarlet uniform." And now, under the shadow of another world conflict, the same patterns of behaviour are emerging and even approved of. The marriage of Juana and Harry is comparable to the phenomenon of the hasty 'wartime weddings' of World War 2, and Juana's subsequent behaviour becomes the example for the female partners in subordinating her wishes to her husband's wartime duty.

== Bibliography ==
- Jane Aiken Hodge, The Private World of Georgette Heyer, Sourcebooks 2011
- Jennifer Kloester, Georgette Heyer's Regency World, Sourcebooks 2010
- Jennifer Kloester, Georgette Heyer, Sourcebooks 2013
