= Bath Tangle =

1955 novel by Georgette Heyer

- First edition
- Author: Georgette Heyer
- Cover artist: Arthur Barbosa
- Language: English
- Genre: Regency, Romance novel
- Publisher: William Heinemann
- Publication date: 1955
- Publication place: United Kingdom
- Media type: Print (Hardback & Paperback)
- Pages: 320 pp

Bath Tangle is a Regency romance by Georgette Heyer. The story is set between 1815 and 1816, although chiefly in the latter year, and relates how three ill-matched couples find happiness by exchanging partners. The novel was published in the UK in March 1955 by Heinemann and in August that year by Putnam in the US.

== Plot ==
As a girl of 19, redheaded Serena Carlow, daughter of the 5th Earl of Spenborough, had won the heart of Hector Kirkby, a younger son with no prospects. Over the years, however, he rises to the rank of Major in the British army in Portugal during the Napoleonic wars and succeeds to his father's modest fortune. During that time, Serena became engaged to Ivo Barrasford, Marquess of Rotherham, whom she had known for many years, and had then caused scandal by withdrawing from the match shortly before they were to be married.

When she reaches the age of 25, Serena's father dies unexpectedly and is succeeded by his cousin. Following the funeral, Serena is shocked to learn that, by the terms of her father's will, Rotherham has been appointed as the Trustee of her inheritance, with the power to approve or veto her future choice of marriage partner. This becomes the occasion of Serena demonstrating her formidable temper, although there is nothing she can do about it. Indeed, she has to retire to the dower house of Milverley Park, her former Gloucestershire home, along with her father's young second wife, Fanny, who is Serena's junior but on close and friendly terms with her. In the following year, they move from their secluded existence there and hire a house in Laura Place, Bath.

In Bath Serena chances to encounter Hector again and the two become secretly engaged. A new acquaintance that Serena makes there is the wealthy widow Mrs Floore, a chatty and outrageously dressed "vulgarian", whose daughter Lady Laleham has married well and is now launching her 17-year-old daughter Emily as a debutante. News reaches Bath that Rotherham has become engaged to the inexperienced Emily, who soon arrives to stay with Mrs Floore so as to avoid the measles afflicting her younger siblings. It is immediately obvious to Fanny and Serena that she is terrified of her noble fiancé, but by now they have problems of their own. Serena has to hold herself seriously in check from quarrelling with her own colourless fiancé, while Hector has discovered that he has fallen in love with the more compatible Fanny.

For his part, Rotherham has no sooner sanctioned Serena's choice of future partner than he receives a furious visit from his undergraduate ward Gerard Monksleigh, who accuses his guardian of ruining his life by stealing his true love, Emily Laleham. The tangle is now complete but unravels soon afterwards. Gerard visits Emily in Bath and browbeats her into attempting to run away with him to Gretna Green. However, Serena and Mrs Floore's stepson, Mr Goring, riding overland together, overtake the couple's two-horse chaise in Gloucester, where Goring dismisses Gerard back to London and returns Emily to Mrs Floore's.

When Serena arrives in Bath, she finds an enraged Rotherham waiting to berate her for interference in his plans. His engagement to Emily was meant to cause Serena sorrow and he is now seeking to make Emily break her engagement with him. The quarrel is then transferred to Mrs Floore's house in Beaufort Square, where the ambitious Lady Laleham forces Emily into apologising to Rotherham. However, her grandmother enters to back Emily up in her reluctance to carry on the engagement, and Goring assures Emily that plenty of other men – himself for example – will still want to marry her despite her behaviour. This so relieves Rotherham that he tells Emily to keep the diamond ring she wishes to return to him, but to wear it on another finger.

Having earlier noticed that the closeness between Hector and Fanny leaves Serena free again, Rotherham returns to Laura Place and silences Serena's renewed attempt to quarrel with him in a rough embrace; he then solves the social dilemma of her not yet being out of mourning for her father by proposing to announce through the London Gazette that they have privately married and are now touring abroad.

== Background ==
Writing at speed, and with the aid of "a most powerful Dope", Georgette Heyer completed the 23 chapters of Bath Tangle in just eight weeks. She sent a résumé of the story to Woman's Journal in advance for their illustrator to work on when it was serialised, although she had to rewrite earlier chapters and change some of the names. In particular she realised that the name she had given her hero, the Marquis of Rockingham, had belonged to a short-lived Prime Minister who had died of influenza in 1782, and she had to change it to Rotherham in mid-career. A. S. Byatt was later to describe the novel as "a tired book" in an otherwise appreciative article in Nova. Situations and characters were beginning to repeat themselves in Heyer's work and a few years later she condensed the plot into the short story "A Clandestine Affair" (1960).

The year in which the novel opens is established by the contents of the parcel of new books with which Serena is hoping to beguile her time after moving to the dower house, all of which were published in 1815. Guy Mannering she swallows "almost at one gulp", but Jane Porter's The Pastor's Fireside, strikes her as flat. There is as well a satirical Life of Napoleon, written in Hudibrastic verse and ascribed to Dr Syntax, An Inquiry Into the Nature and Progress of Rent by Thomas Robert Malthus, and William Hubbard's A general history of New England, none of which are to her taste. More literary discussion occurs after Serena and Fanny move to Bath in the next year. There Fanny reports that she had stood next to the novelist Madame d'Arblay while buying ribbon but did not dare to mention her admiration for the author's Evelina (1778). A writer, she felt, would prefer discussion of her more recent work, but Fanny had found The Wanderer (1814) "so tedious I gave it up after the first volume".

Other subjects of conversation were developments in the capital. Of particular interest were the marriage plans of the heir to the throne, Princess Charlotte, who also had broken off her engagement – to the Prince of Orange – and finally in 1816 was allowed to marry Prince Leopold of Saxe-Coburg-Saalfeld. One of her supporters at this time was Lord Brougham, whose parliamentary speeches and activities were reported in the press and discussed by the characters in Bath Tangle. In particular, his attack on the Prince Regent in March 1816 is mentioned in the novel.

Heyer's background reading while researching for her novels was collected in a variety of notebooks containing details of the social conventions of the times to which there are frequent allusions. The period of observing mourning after the death of a family member affects both Serena and Fanny, who are obliged to wear only black for the first months after the death and a less subdued colour thereafter. They also have to avoid dances, parties and other social events during this time, which becomes a problem when Serena wishes to marry Rotherham. It is for this reason that their wedding must be a private ceremony, followed by a Continental honeymoon which would cause no scandal. Another restriction on women's behaviour was the requirement for chaperonage to preserve the reputation of an unmarried female. The convention was that a married woman counted as an adequate chaperone, and therefore the widowed Fanny acts in that capacity for Serena, despite the disparity in their ages. It is in consideration of Serena's reputation, too, that the very proper Ned Goring is alarmed when Serena proposes to join him unaccompanied by her groom in pursuing Monksleigh and Emily.

Personal dynamics are of particular concern in Heyer's more modern view. For her, the quality of a person is demonstrated by their behaviour rather than the social class to which they belong. Jennifer Kloester points out that "There is a clear contrast in the novel between the supposed vulgarity of Mrs Floore (because of her "trade" background) and the real vulgarity of her far more aristocratic daughter, Lady Laleham." Lady Laleham makes her upwardly mobile social aspirations too obvious and is despised as a "toad eater" (a sycophant) on that account. Mrs Floore's openness about her own background, while giving due recognition to the place of others in the social scale, is what distinguishes her behaviour from her daughter's.

But among Georgette Heyer's particular targets for satire are self-regarding young men, especially those with poetical aspirations – such as Augustus Fawnhope in The Grand Sophy. Her victim in Bath Tangle is Gerard Monksleigh who, among the grievances he holds against his guardian, is the Marquess of Rotherham's failure to provide the money to publish his youthful verses. "Only consider Lord Byron," he expostulates later to Emily, "he must have made a fortune, and if he could do so, why should not I?" Byron had indeed published Hours of Idleness (1807) following his nineteenth birthday, although it was not this that made the reputation he afterwards enjoyed. Included in that volume is the poem "To a lady who presented the author with the velvet band which bound her tresses", in the kind of flirtation with Gerard that young Emily, "if she remembered the vows she had exchanged with him, supposed that he had meant them no more seriously than she had." Her dandiacal suitor is besides the object of a medley of insults, deriving from Heyer's notebooks of contemporary slang and directed against him at various times by Goring, Serena, Mrs Floore and Rotherham: "young fribble", "counter-cockscomb", "twiddle-poop", "ill-conditioned puppy without gratitude, without propriety, without a thought in your heart for anything but what may happen to suit your pleasure", "Bartholemew baby", "bag of wind", "addle-brained cawker", "slow-top" and "cod's head".

== Bibliography ==
- Joan Aiken Hodge, The Private World of Georgette Heyer, Source Books 1984
- Jennifer Kloester, Georgette Heyer's Regency World, Sourcebooks 2005
