= Sir Harry Smith, 1st Baronet =

British Army officer and colonial administrator (1787–1860)

Lieutenant-General Sir Harry Smith GCB Bt
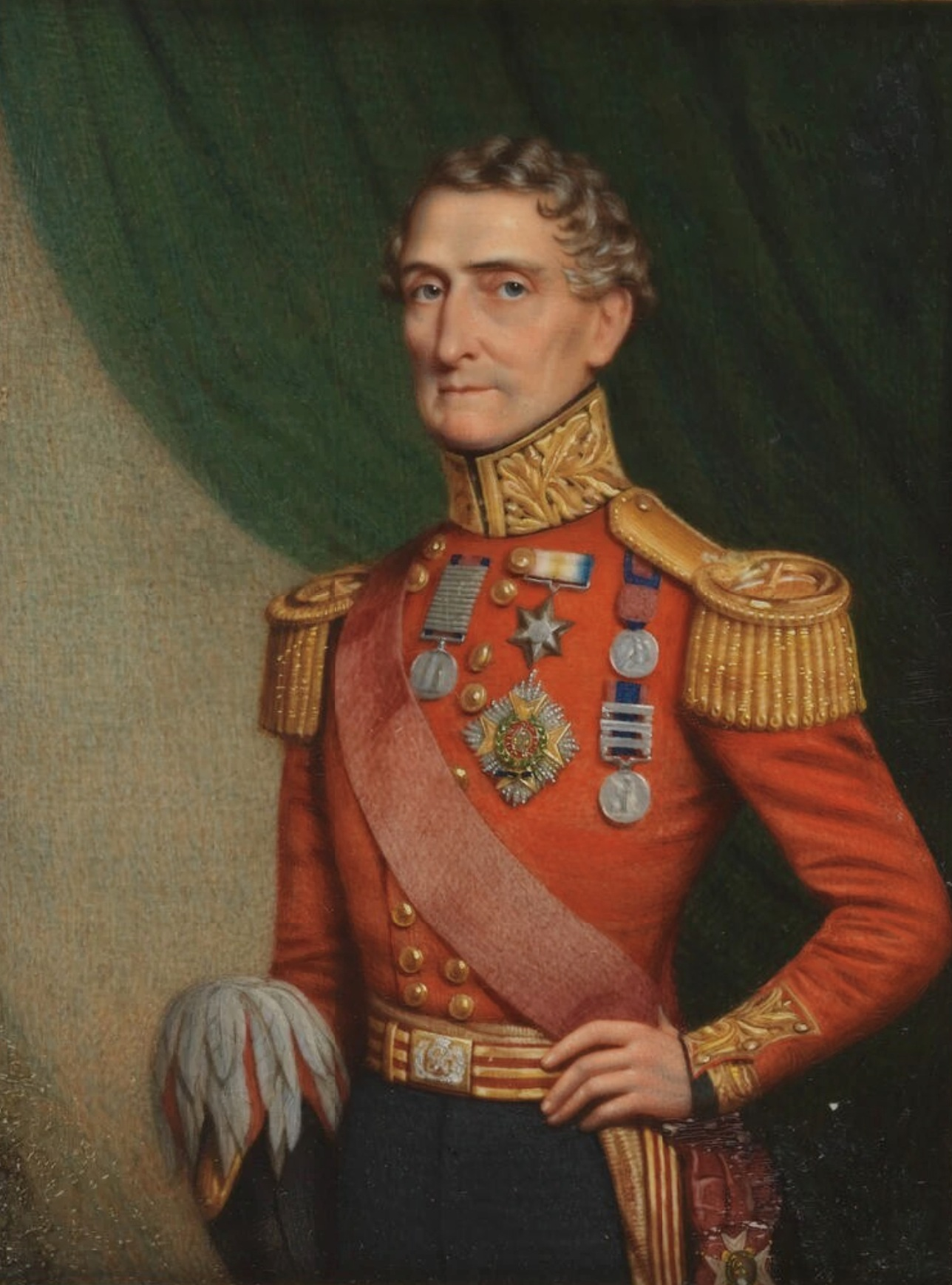
- Portrait of Smith
- Born: 28 June 1787; Whittlesey, Cambridgeshire
- Died: 12 October 1860 (aged 73); London, England
- Spouse: Juana María de los Dolores de León (married 1812)
- Military career
- Allegiance: United Kingdom
- Branch: British Army
- Service years: 1805–1859
- Rank: Lieutenant-General
- Commands: Western District; Northern District
- Conflicts: Napoleonic Wars; War of 1812; Xhosa Wars; Gwalior campaign First Anglo-Sikh War; Battle of Boomplaats
- Awards: Knight Grand Cross of the Order of the Bath

Lieutenant-General Sir Henry George Wakelyn Smith, 1st Baronet, GCB (28 June 1787 – 12 October 1860) was a British Army officer and colonial administrator. A veteran of the Napoleonic Wars, he is also particularly remembered for his role in the Battle of Aliwal, India in 1846, his subsequent governorship of the Cape Colony, and as the husband of Lady Smith.

== Biography ==
He was born in Whittlesey, Isle of Ely, Cambridgeshire, the son of a surgeon and major in the Wisbech, Whittlesey and Thorney United Battalion. The east end of the south aisle of St. Mary’s church was at this time partitioned off and used as a schoolroom, the vicar or curate teaching. It was here that Harry Smith received his education from the Rev. George Burgess, then curate.

During a review of the unit by General Stewart, he got into conversation with the youth and offered to procure him a commission. A short time later a commission as a second lieutenant with the 95th Rifle Regiment arrived. A chapel in the town's St Mary's church was restored in his memory in 1862, and a local community college also bears his name: Sir Harry Smith Community College.

=== Napoleonic Wars ===
Harry Smith—for throughout life he adopted the more familiar form of his Christian name—was educated privately and was commissioned on 8 May 1805, and then promoted Lieutenant on 15 August. His first active service was in South America in 1806 during the British invasions of the Río de la Plata. He distinguished himself at the Battle of Montevideo in 1807, but first came to real prominence during the Peninsular War. Smith served throughout these campaigns with the 95th Rifles in which he served from 1808 through to the end of the war at the Battle of Toulouse in 1814.

In 1810 he was appointed ADC to Colonel Beckwith. Early in 1812, on 28 February, he was promoted Captain, having already the previous March joined the 2nd brigade Light Division as major to the Major-Generals staff. On 7 April, the day following the storming of Badajoz a well-born Spanish lady, whose entire property in the city had been destroyed, presented herself at the British lines seeking protection from the licence of the soldiery for herself and her sister, a child of fourteen. The latter, Juana Maria de Los Dolores de León, had but recently emerged from a convent; but notwithstanding her years she was married to Harry Smith a few days later. She accompanied him throughout the rest of the war.

At the close of the war, Harry Smith volunteered for service in the United States, where he was present at the Battle of Bladensburg on 24 August 1814, and witnessed the burning of the capitol at Washington; which, as he said, "horrified us coming fresh from the Duke's humane warfare in the south of France."

Returning to Europe he was a brigade major at the Battle of Waterloo in 1815, and afterwards rewarded as Assistant Quartermaster-General to the division. During the occupation of France he was sent to be Mayor of Cambrai in Picardy. With the restoration of peace in France he returned to divisional ADC at Glasgow for Major-General Reynell, GOC Western District of Scotland. Smith impressed Reynell, who helped his appointment as ADC to the Governor of Nova Scotia, Lieutenant-General Sir James Kempt in 1826.

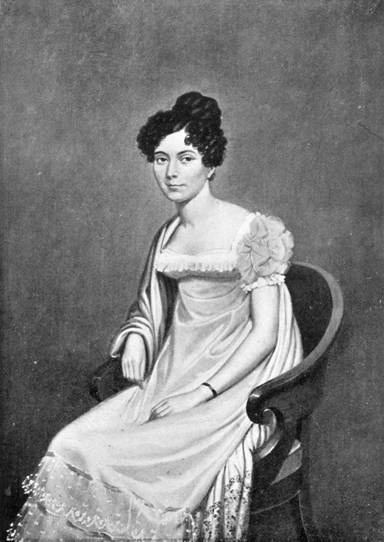
Juana María de los Dolores de León Smith

=== Xhosa Kingdom ===
Smith was promoted Major in the army by the end of 1826, but remained unattached to a regimental posting, and was still unattached when raised to Lieutenant-colonel in July 1830. In 1828 Smith was ordered to the Cape of Good Hope, where he commanded a force in the Sixth Xhosa War of 1834-36. In 1835 he accomplished the feat of riding the 550 miles from Cape Town to Grahamstown in less than six days; after he had restored confidence among the whites by his energetic measures, he was appointed governor of the Province of Queen Adelaide, where he gained influence over the native tribes, whom he vigorously set himself to civilize and benefit.

But though Sir Benjamin D'Urban, the high commissioner, supported Smith, the ministry in London reversed his policy and, to quote Smith's own words, "directed the Province of Queen Adelaide to be restored to barbarism." Smith himself was removed from his command, his departure being deplored alike by Bantu and Boers. Many Boers, largely in consequence of this policy of Lord Glenelg, began the migration to the interior known as the Great Trek.

=== India ===
Smith was appointed Adjutant-General in India in 1840, where he took part in the Gwalior campaign of 1843, for which he was appointed a Knight Commander of the Order of the Bath (KCB). From 1845 to 1846, he fought in the First Anglo-Sikh War. He was in command of a division under Sir Hugh Gough at the battles of Mudki and Ferozeshah, where he conspicuously distinguished himself, but was insufficiently supported by the commander-in-chief. After the second of these actions, Smith was appointed to an independent command, and on 28 January 1846 he inflicted a crushing defeat on the Sikhs at Aliwal on the Sutlej.

At the Battle of Sobraon on 10 February he again commanded a division under Gough. For the great victory of Aliwal he was awarded the thanks of Parliament; and the speech of the Duke of Wellington was perhaps the warmest encomium ever bestowed by that great commander on a meritorious officer. Smith was at the same time created a baronet; and as a special distinction the words "of Aliwal" were by the patent appended to the title. He was promoted to Major-General on 9 November 1846.

=== Return to South Africa ===
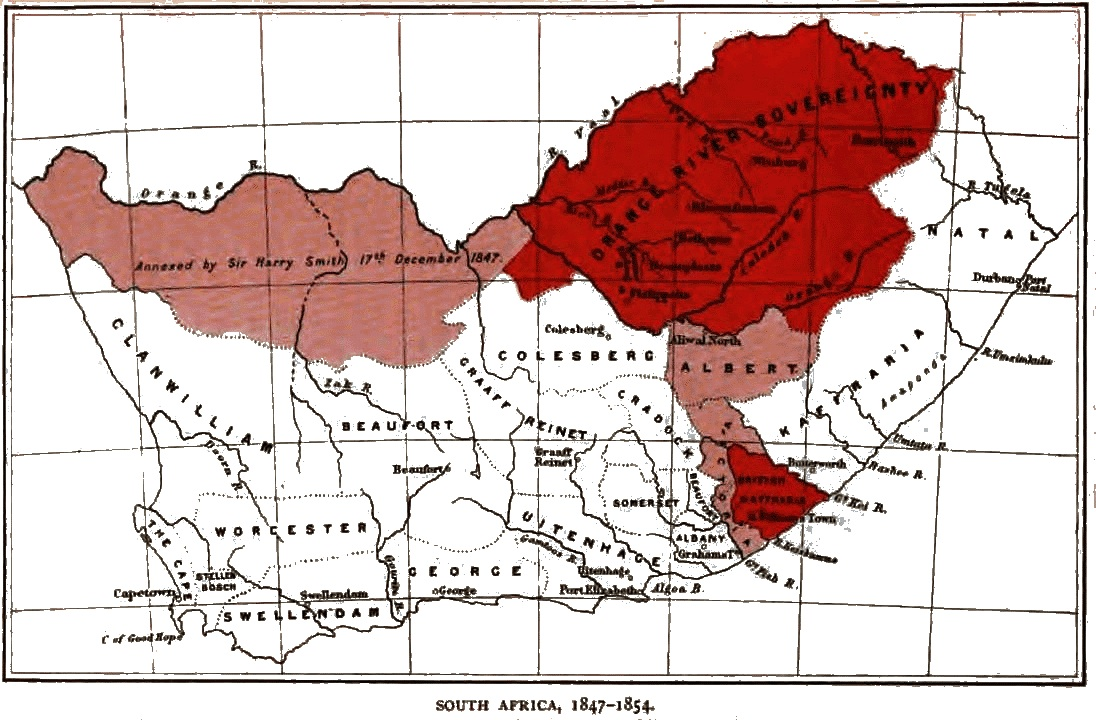
Smith's annexations from 1847 to 1854

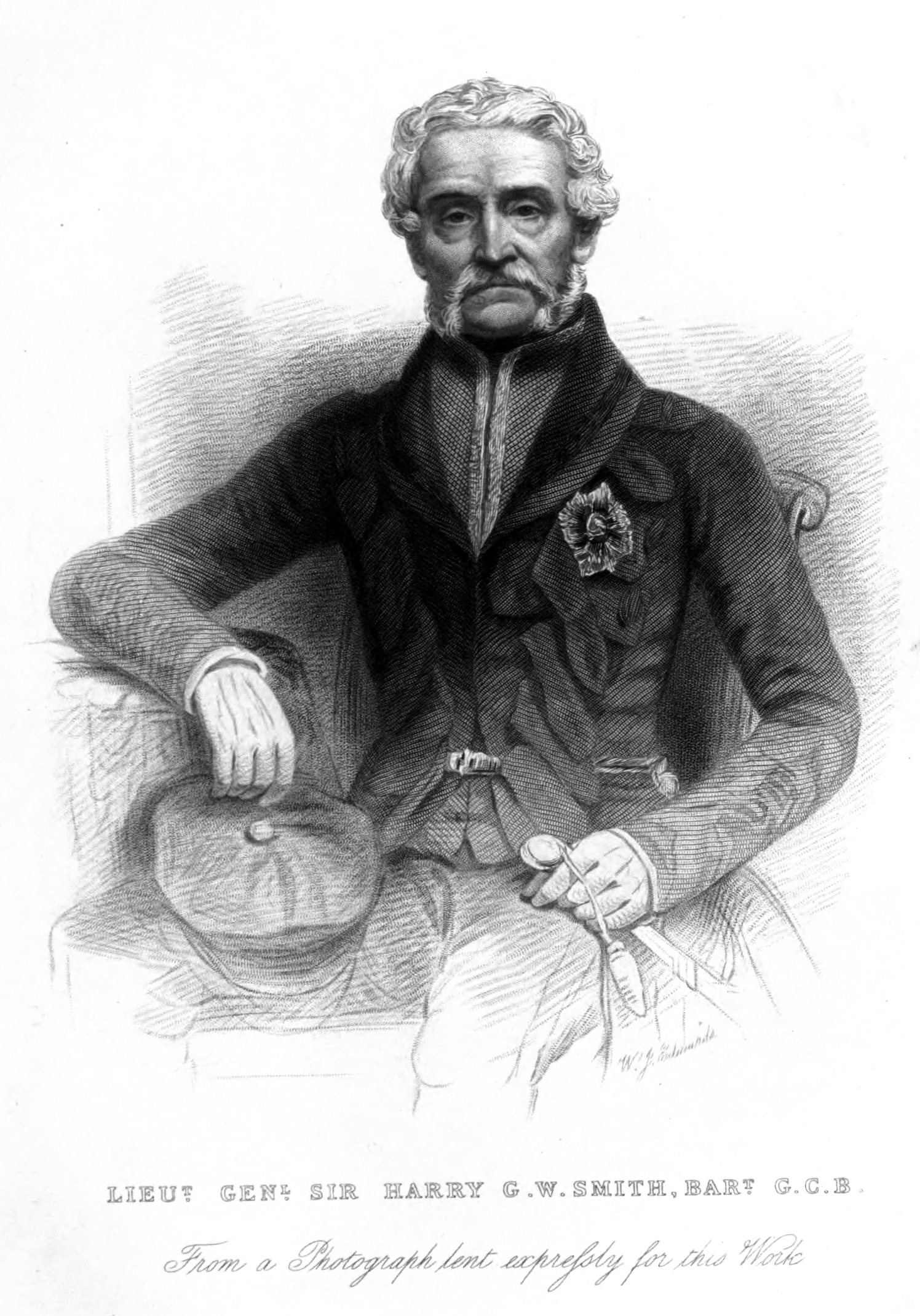
1860 portrait of Smith

In 1847 he returned to South Africa as Governor of Cape Colony and high commissioner, with the local rank of Lieutenant-General, to grapple with the difficulties he had foreseen eleven years before. Issues he faced ranged from domestic problems within the colony, such as the Convict Crisis of 1849, as well as external threats such as instability on the Cape's eastern frontier.

He took command of an expedition to deal with the disaffected Boers in the Orange River Sovereignty, and fought the Battle of Boomplaats on 29 August 1848. It has been claimed that "the half-mad Smith's" establishment of British Kaffraria through annexation in 1848 was launched and carried out "entirely on his own initiative." During the annexation, Smith placed his foot on the neck of a Xhosa chief and proclaimed "I am your Paramount Chief, and the Kaffirs are my dogs!" To emphasis his point, he ordered a wagon packed with explosives to be blown up in front of 2,000 Xhosa.

In December 1850 war broke out with the Xhosa and some of the Khoikhoi; Smith was insufficiently supplied with troops from England; and though his conduct of the operations was warmly approved by the Duke of Wellington and other military authorities, Earl Grey, in a dispatch never submitted to the queen, recalled him in 1852 before the Xhosa and Khoikhoi had been completely subdued. He protested strongly against the abandonment of the Orange River Sovereignty to the Boers, which was carried out two years after his departure, and he actively furthered the granting of responsible government to Cape Colony.

His wife Juana gave her name to Ladysmith in KwaZulu-Natal as well as Ladismith in the Western Cape province. Harrismith in the Free State was named after Smith himself (two other towns, Aliwal North in the Eastern Cape and Smithfield in the Free State, also mark Smith's connection with South Africa). Impressed by the showing of the Cape Mounted Riflemen under his command, Smith created Sir Harry Smith's Medal for Gallantry in recognition of their conduct.

=== Back in England ===
In 1853 he was made General Officer Commanding Western District back in England. He was given brevet promotion to lieutenant-general on 20 June 1854 and appointed GOC Northern District in 1856.

After a long illness he died at his home at Eton Place, London, on 12 October 1860. He was buried at St Mary's, Whittlesey, where he is commemorated with a marble bust and memorial. That section of the church is known as Sir Harry's Chapel. His wife, Juana, deceased 10 October 1872, is interred with him.

His autobiography, first published posthumously in 1901, is regarded as a classic of love and war.

The story of Harry Smith and his wife in the Peninsular Campaign and the Battle of Waterloo is narrated in Georgette Heyer's novel The Spanish Bride (1940).

== Notes ==
Military offices
| Preceded by Sir William Anson | Colonel of the 47th (the Lancashire) Regiment of Foot; 1847 | Succeeded by Thomas Dalmer |
| Preceded by Sir Dugald Gilmour | Colonel-Commandant of the 2nd Battalion, Rifle Brigade; 1855–1860 | Succeeded by Sir George Brown |
| Preceded by Sir Henry Murray | GOC Western District; 1853–1854 | Succeeded by George Eden |
| Preceded by Sir Andrew Barnard | Colonel-Commandant of the 1st Battalion, Rifle Brigade; 1855–1860 | Succeeded by Sir George Buller |
| Preceded by Lord Cathcart | GOC Northern District; 1856–1859 | Succeeded by Sir John Pennefather |
Government offices
| Preceded by Henry Pottinger | Governor of the Cape Colony; 1847–1852 | Succeeded by Sir George Cathcart |
Baronetage of the United Kingdom
| New creation | Baronet (of Aliwal); 1846–1860 | Extinct |
