= Devil's Cub =

1932 novel by Georgette Heyer

- First edition
- Author: Georgette Heyer
- Language: English
- Genre: Georgian, Romance novel
- Publisher: William Heinemann
- Publication date: 1932
- Publication place: United Kingdom
- Media type: Print (Hardback & Paperback)
- Pages: 288 pp
- Preceded by: These Old Shades
- Followed by: An Infamous Army

Devil's Cub is a Georgian romance novel written by Georgette Heyer. Set in 1780, it is the sequel to These Old Shades (1926). The book was published in 1932, and has not been out of print since. It is one of Heyer's most popular novels.

== Plot summary ==
The son of the Duke and Duchess of Avon, the Marquis of Vidal, is known as Devil's Cub not only for the excesses of his father but for his own wild habits. As he is paying court to a girl of the bourgeoisie, Sophia Challoner, he also participates in a rather impromptu duel, the outcome of which forces him to leave the country. He intends to bring Sophia with him as his mistress: but her strait-laced sister Mary has no intention of allowing her sister to be ruined, and takes her place, assuming that the Marquis will let her go once the mistake is discovered, leaving him with no chance to take Sophia afterwards. But she has not yet obtained the measure of the Marquis's personality, for in the grip of fury he takes Mary off with him instead, and only when they are in France and it is too late for either to turn back does he realise that by abducting a respectable girl he has compromised her and is obliged to offer her marriage.

However, Mary refuses Vidal because she believes he is making the offer from guilt and as she has fallen in love with him she finds this intolerable. In her misery, she runs away, intending to seek her own fortune. While away, she meets Vidal's father, the Duke of Avon, by chance, and takes him into her confidence without realising that she is talking to Avon - who is an old crony of her grandfather's and has come to France to investigate the rumours surrounding his son and scotch any scandal. The two reach an excellent understanding, with Avon clearly coming to respect Mary.

Vidal pursues, and ultimately realizes he loves her, persuading her to marry him — in spite of Avon's dry observation that she could do better.

Heyer's An Infamous Army is a sequel to Devil's Cub.

== Characters ==
- Dominic Alastair, Marquis of Vidal, son and heir to the Duke of Avon, educated at Eton
- Miss Sophia Challoner, Vidal's latest flirt
- Miss Mary Challoner, elder sister of Sophia, 20, educated at a select seminary for ladies with Miss Juliana Marling at the expense of her grandfather, General Challoner
- Mrs Clara Challoner (née Simpkins), their mother, widow of a gentleman and sister of a rich Cit
- Mr Henry Simpkins, brother of Mrs Challoner
- Mr Joshua Simpkins, Henry's son
- Lady Fanny Marling (née Alastair), sister of the Duke of Avon
- Mr John Marling, Lady Fanny's son
- Miss Juliana Marling, Lady Fanny's daughter
- Mr Frederick Comyn, aspirant to Juliana's hand
- Hugh Davenant, friend of Justin Alastair, Duke of Avon
- His Grace Justin Alastair, Duke of Avon, father of Vidal, a reformed rake and 'devil'
- Her Grace Léonie Alastair (née de Saint-Vire), Duchess of Avon, mother of Vidal and a French aristocrat
- Lord Rupert Alastair, brother of the Duke of Avon
- Tante Elisabeth, Juliana's cousin (whom she calls "aunt")
- Mr Montague Quarles, Vidal's opponent in a duel
- Mr Timms, Vidal's valet
- Mr Fletcher, Vidal's majordomo
- Armand de Saint-Vire, Vidal's great-uncle
- Bertrand de Saint-Vire, Vidal's cousin
- Mr Hammond, an English divine
- Monsieur Plançon, proprietor of the Coq d'Or, an Inn at Calais
