= Mustard plaster =

Medicinal poultice

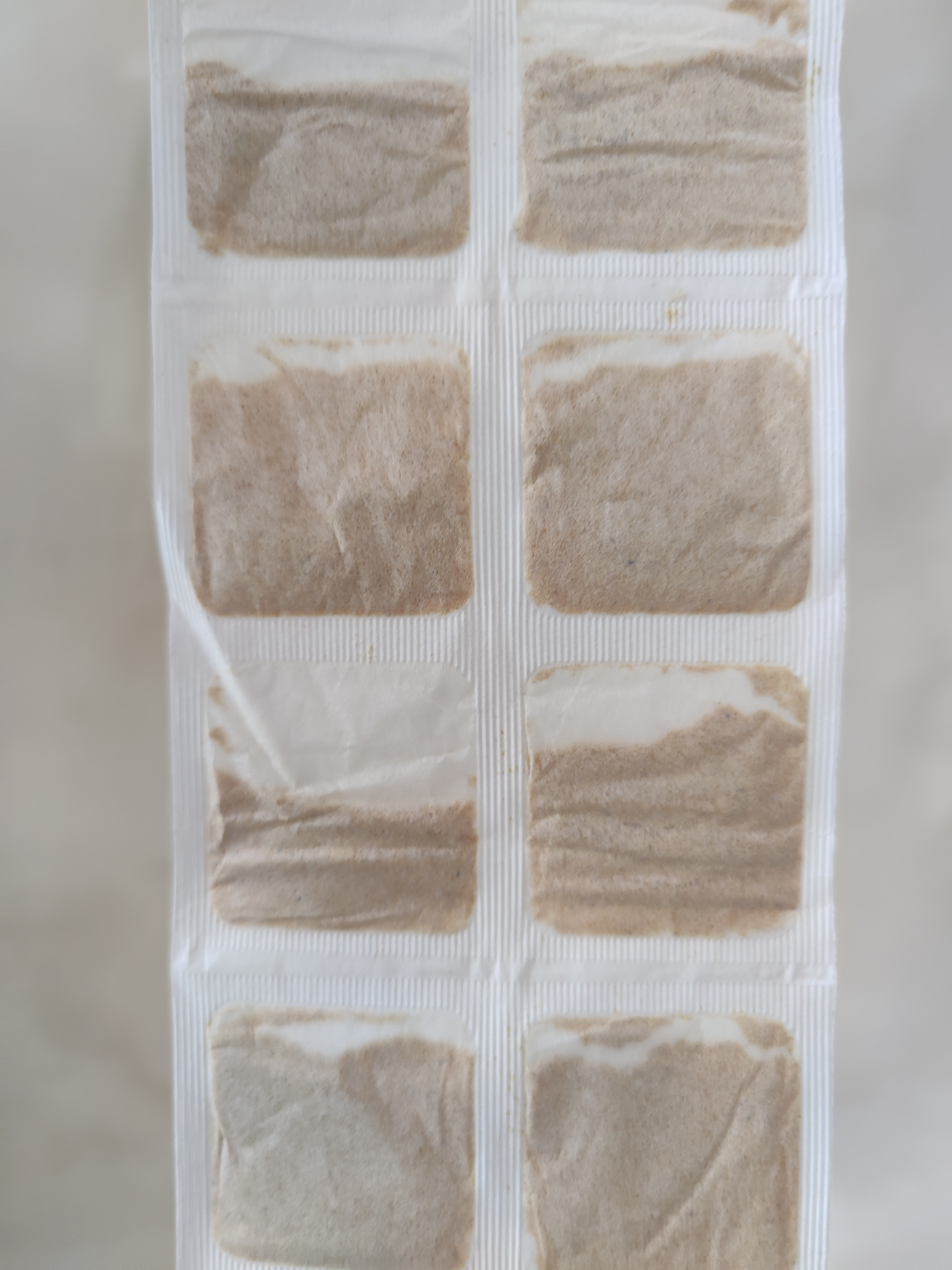

A mustard plaster, also known as a blister, is a poultice of mustard seed powder spread inside a protective dressing and applied to the body to stimulate healing. It can be used to warm muscle tissues and for chronic aches and pains. It was once part of conventional medical treatment, and available in prepared versions in pharmacies. It fell from favor in the 20th century and is now used only as a home remedy.

== Uses ==
Mustard plasters were used for aches and pains, including rheumatism, arthritis, and sore muscles. It was also used for chest congestion.

== Side effects ==
If left in place for too long, it can produce first-degree burns to the skin. Vapors might cause nausea.

== See also ==
- Mustard bath
- Fanny Crosby, possibly blinded as an infant by mustard plasters
