= The Black Moth =

1921 romance novel by Georgette Heyer

- First edition
- Author: Georgette Heyer
- Cover artist: Walter Lambert
- Language: English
- Genre: Georgian, Romance
- Publisher: Heinemann
- Publication date: 1921
- Publication place: United Kingdom
- Pages: 320
- Followed by: These Old Shades

The Black Moth (1921) is a Georgian era romance novel by the British author Georgette Heyer, set around 1751. The Black Moth was Heyer's debut novel, published when Heyer was nineteen. It was a commercial success.

The story follows Lord Jack Carstares, an English nobleman who becomes a highwayman after taking the blame during a cheating scandal years before. One day, he rescues Miss Diana Beauleigh when she is almost abducted by the Duke of Andover. Jack and Diana fall in love but his troubled past and current profession threaten their happiness.

Based on a story she had written for her brother and published with the encouragement of her father, the book has been considered a flawed work by modern critics; they have observed characteristics Heyer included in her later works.

== Development ==
The British writer Georgette Heyer (1902–1974) was born in Wimbledon, London, and grew up amidst many literary influences. Her father, George Heyer, was an author and former member of the Wimbledon Literary and Scientific Society, and as a teenager she befriended the future writers Joanna Cannan and Carola Oman. In 1921, the elder Heyer encouraged his daughter to publish a story she had written for her haemophiliac younger brother Boris. This story became the nineteen-year-old girl's literary debut and was published as The Black Moth.

== Plot summary ==
The story is set during the Georgian era in the 1750s, and follows Lord Jack Carstares, the eldest son of the Earl of Wyncham. Six years ago, Jack took the blame when his younger brother Richard cheated at cards. Jack consequently faced social exile and fled England for the European continent. He has now secretly returned, robbing carriages as a highwayman. In public he calls himself Sir Anthony Ferndale.

Jack discovers his father has died but refuses to take up his role as the new earl of Wyncham, preferring that his brother enjoy the family's privileges in his place. The amiable Richard, who still feels guilty over his role in his brother's social ruin, refuses. This decision displeases Richard's spoiled wife, Lavinia.

A disguised Jack attempts to rob a carriage, but fails when his prey notices Jack's pistol is not loaded. The supposed victim, Miles O’Hara, a Justice of the Peace, arrests Jack. Recognizing Jack is a gentleman, Miles takes him back to his residence to interview him. Miles is delighted to discover the outlaw is actually his old friend, estranged since the gambling incident years earlier.

Lavinia's brother, the Duke of Andover—called the "Devil" among society—is sarcastic, darkly humoured and manipulative. He desires Miss Diana Beauleigh, a young woman he met in Bath, and is almost successful in abducting her when a disguised Jack encounters them. The two duel, and Jack triumphs over Andover and frees Diana. Jack is injured and recovers at Diana's home. He does not reveal his identity, instead referring to himself as Mr. Carr. The two fall in love but Jack cannot allow himself to be with her, as he sees himself as a scoundrel and unworthy of her love. He returns to the O'Hara residence.

Richard becomes upset when Lavinia spends too much time with one of her old suitors, Captain Harold Lovelace. Richard can keep silent no longer and plans to reveal his cheating to a large party, to the dismay of Lavinia. Richard gives her permission to leave him and elope with Lovelace, but she realises she truly loves her husband and sees the error in her spoiled ways. The two reconcile and embrace happily.

The Duke of Andover succeeds in kidnapping Diana, desiring to marry her. He brings her back to Andover Court, his estate. Jack learns of the abduction and arrives in time to duel Andover. Richard, Miles, and Andover's brother Lord Andrew arrive and stop the fight right as Jack collapses from fatigue. Richard confesses his role in the cheating scandal, clearing his brother's name. Jack and Diana embrace and get married. They avoid a scandal with Andover, as the latter persuades them that any news of the abduction will hurt Diana's reputation.

== Main characters ==
- John "Jack" Carstares, Earl of Wyncham
- Richard "Dick" Carstares – brother of John
- Lady Lavinia Carstares (née Belmanoir) – wife of Richard
- Tracy Belmanoir, Duke of Andover – Lavinia's brother
- Lord Andrew Belmanoir – Lavinia's brother
- Diana Beauleigh – a young woman from Sussex
- Jim Salter – John's servant
- Sir Miles O'Hara – John's best friend
- Frank Fortescue – Andover's friend

== Release and reception ==
The initial publication of The Black Moth was by Constable, and it was published in the United States by Houghton and Mifflin. The novel was a commercial success. In a contemporary review published in 1921, The Times Literary Supplement deemed the protagonist Jack a "fascinating hero of romance" and added that the novel was "a well-filled story which keeps the reader pleased".

== Sequel ==
These Old Shades, which came out in 1926, was originally intended to be a sequel to The Black Moth, which would redeem the devilish Belmanoir. But as The Black Moth was a melodrama and a sequel per se would not work in with the plot, she decided to make the new novel stand alone, renamed many characters and made them 'shades' of their former selves for These Old Shades.

The Black Moth	These Old Shades
Tracy "Devil" Belmanoir, Duke of Andover	Justin "Satanas" Alastair, Duke of Avon
Lady Lavinia Carstares (née Belmanoir)	Lady Fanny Marling (née Alastair)
The Hon. Richard Carstares	Mr. Edward Marling
John Carstares	John Marling
Lord Andrew Belmanoir	Lord Rupert Alastair
Harriet Fleming (née Belmanoir)	Harriet Field (née Alastair)
Miss Diana Beauleigh	Lady Merivale (née Jennifer Beauchamp)
Jack Carstares, Earl of Wyncham	Anthony, Lord Merivale
Frank Fortescue	Hugh Davenant
Sir John Fortescue	Frederick, Lord Colehatch

== Analysis and legacy ==
Scholars have perceived The Black Moth's influence on Heyer's later works. In an essay published in 2012, K. Elizabeth Spillman describes the novel as "improbable" and "heavily derivative" but notes characteristics visible in Heyer's other books: the centrality of friendship, seamless action scenes, and a "natural discourse" between the male protagonists. The Encyclopaedia of British Writers adds that The Black Moth is "typical" of many later Heyer novels, as it has a "historical setting, aristocratic characters, and exciting plot". As Jack lives as a highwayman, James Devlin also notes themes of violence, suspense and criminality that appear in other Heyer stories such as The Masqueraders (1928) and Faro's Daughter (1941).

Spillman also opines that Diana is the only Heyer heroine to be "unironic [and] untraditional", as the novel is dominated by the doings of its male characters. Diana is relegated to the background, "as if the author had little interest in her own heroine". In later Heyer novels, Spillman writes, the heroines show more agency and will.

In 2012, Diana Wallace wrote of similarities between The Black Moth and the works of Jeffery Farnol and Rafael Sabatini, as well as Baroness Orczy's story The Scarlet Pimpernel.
