= Black Sheep (Heyer novel) =

1966 novel by Georgette Heyer

- First edition
- Author: Georgette Heyer
- Cover artist: Arthur Barbosa
- Language: English
- Genre: Regency, Romance
- Publisher: Bodley Head
- Publication date: 1966
- Publication place: United Kingdom
- Pages: 336
- OCLC: 183179611
- Dewey Decimal: 823/.912 22
- LC Class: PR6015.E795 B5 2008

Black Sheep is a late Regency romance novel by Georgette Heyer which was published by The Bodley Head in 1966 and in the following year in the US by E. P. Dutton. The serial rights were also sold to Woman & Home. The novel was later described as combining "the warmer tone of her later books with the neat plotting of some of the earlier ones". Set in Bath, Somerset in 1816/1817, the story centres upon Abigail Wendover, the unmarried youngest daughter of a family dynasty and her interaction with Miles Calverleigh and his unscrupulous nephew Stacy.

== Plot summary ==
At the start of the novel, 28-year-old Abigail (Abby) Wendover returns from a visit to the ailing family of an elder sister. She soon learns that there are complications in her own family upon discovering that her seventeen-year-old niece Fanny, daughter of her late brother Roland and brought up by her two maiden aunts in Bath, has fallen in love with a most unsuitable suitor with the connivance of her foolish and hypochondriacal aunt Selina. The object of Fanny's "lasting attachment" is Stacy Calverleigh, a "gamester", a "loose fish", and a "gazetted fortune-hunter"—that is to say, a gambler and a libertine who is on the look-out for a wealthy marriage to repair the imminent crash of his fortune.

Abigail tries to enlist the help of Stacy's uncle Miles, newly arrived in Bath, but at the same time must keep her attraction for Miles under wraps, out of concern for expected disapproval from her brother James (who would try to curtail her ability to have her own household if he knew) and her chaperoning older sister.
