= The Conqueror (Heyer novel) =

1931 historical novel by Georgette Heyer

- First edition
- Author: Georgette Heyer
- Language: English
- Genre: Historical novel
- Publisher: Heinemann
- Publication date: 1931
- Publication place: United Kingdom
- Media type: Print
- Pages: 368 pp
- OCLC: 226213203
- Dewey Decimal: 823/.912 22
- LC Class: PR6015.E795 C66 2008

The Conqueror is a 1931 historical novel written by Georgette Heyer. It is based on the life of William the Conqueror. It was positively reviewed upon release.

== Plot summary ==
It chronicles the life of William of Normandy (the Conqueror) from his birth in 1028 to his conquest of England in 1066. Born the illegitimate son of Robert, future Duke of Normandy, William has to fight to prove himself in the eyes of his people and the eyes of his enemies. Succeeding to the title at age seven, William relies heavily on the support of his great-uncle, Archbishop Robert. With the death of Archbishop Robert only a year after William becomes Duke of Normandy, the duchy descends into chaos and anarchy, with many parties contending for control over the young duke. At first, Alan of Brittany takes custody of the duke, and when Alan dies he is replaced by Gilbert of Brionne. Gilbert is killed within months, and another guardian, Turchetil, is also killed around the time of Gilbert's death. Yet another guardian, Osbern, is slain in William's chamber while the duke sleeps. Walter, William's uncle, is forced to hide the young duke in the houses of peasants. After the fight is won William then has to prove himself to Lady Matilda, daughter of Count Baldwin of Flanders, to win her love.
