= Sprig Muslin =

1956 novel by Georgette Heyer

- First edition
- Author: Georgette Heyer
- Cover artist: Arthur Barbosa
- Language: English
- Genre: Regency, Romance
- Publisher: William Heinemann
- Publication date: 1956
- Publication place: United Kingdom
- Media type: Print (Hardback & Paperback)
- Pages: 272

Sprig Muslin is a Regency romance novel by Georgette Heyer. The story is set in 1813.

== Plot summary ==
Sir Gareth is a noted Corinthian and has been a confirmed bachelor ever since his betrothed died prematurely, seven years ago. He decides for practical reasons to marry an old friend, Hester, who is unfashionable and plain, not to mention "on the shelf" at the age of 29. However, he soon meets a young, runaway girl and determines to resolve her problems satisfactorily. Unfortunately, this particular runaway is possessed of an extremely lively imagination, and gets them both into a little more trouble than he had bargained for.

== Characters ==
- Sir Gareth Ludlow — a Corinthian who never got over the death of his fiancée Clarissa Lincombe seven years ago.
- Lady Hester Theale — 29, the eldest daughter of Lord Brancaster
- Lord Theale, Earl of Brancaster — Lady Hester's widowed father, profligate member of the Prince Regent's set, country seat is Brancaster Park, Chatteris
- Lord Theale, Viscount Widmore — Lady Hester's brother
- Cliff — Lord Theale's butler
- Povey — Lady Hester's maid
- Amanda 'Smith' — intrepid daughter of general, 17
- Captain Neil — a brigade major
- Mrs Beatrix Wetherby Sir Gareth's sister
- Mr Warren Wetherby — Sir Gareth's brother-in-law
- The Reverend Augustus Whiteleaf — Lord Brancaster's chaplain, aspirant to Lady Hester's hand
- The Honourable Fabian Theale — Lord Brancaster's brother, a roué
- Trotton — Sir Gareth's groom
- Mr & Mrs Sheet — proprietors of an inn at Bythorn
- Mr Joe Ninfield — a farmhand, godson of Mrs Sheet
- Mr Hildebrand Ross — a dramatist and student of Cambridge, on his way to Ludlow on vacation
- Mrs & Mrs Chicklaid — proprietors of the Bull Inn at Little Staughton
