= Mustard bath =

Traditional therapeutic remedy

A mustard bath is a traditional therapeutic remedy for tired, stressed muscles, colds, fevers and seizures. The mustard was thought to draw out toxins and warm the muscles, blood and body. It was a standard medical practice up until the first part of the twentieth century and continues to be used in alternative medicine.

== General use ==
Baths in general have been historically used in medical practices for a variety of reasons, from stimulating the skin, to acting as a sedative, and also simply to clean. Mustard baths specifically were known for their ability to remove toxins from the body and providing a feeling of warmth to the skin. However, if applied incorrectly or for too long it can cause inflammation to the skin. Mustard seeds contain manganese, iron, and magnesium, all chemicals that have anti-inflammatory properties, evidence of using mustard as a way to treat inflammation dates back to Ancient Greece where it is said that Pythagoras recommended mustard seeds as a remedy for scorpion stings.

Mustard baths have been used to treat a variety of illnesses, ranging from acne to insanity, typically it was thought that the sensation of warmth brought on by mustard baths had a calming effect on the body and could calm a racing heart. It was also common for mustard baths to be used specifically to treat children, because it is seen as a gentle way to treat the skin in cases of pneumonia or typhoid fever.

In the modern-day mustard baths continue to be used in alternative medicine circles to alleviate chronic pain, however the FDA, along with other nations has banned the sale of crude mustard oil due to its erucic acid content.

The amount of mustard needed to create a mustard bath varies in historical record with one source claiming that "five or six handfuls of crude mustard" are needed to create a proper mustard bath, while another claims that a pound of mustard in a small tub full of water is what's needed.

== See also ==
- Mustard plaster
- Balneotherapy
