= Regency Buck =

1935 novel by Georgette Heyer

- First edition
- Author: Georgette Heyer
- Language: English
- Genre: Regency, Romance
- Publisher: William Heinemann
- Publication date: 1935
- Publication place: United Kingdom
- Media type: Print (Hardback & Paperback)
- Pages: 368 pp
- Followed by: An Infamous Army

Regency Buck is a novel written by Georgette Heyer. It has three distinctions: it is the first of her novels to deal with the Regency period; it is one of only a few to combine both genres for which she was noted, the Regency romance and the mystery novel; and it is the only one of her Regency stories to feature Beau Brummell as an actual character, rather than as someone merely mentioned in passing. The story is set in 1811–1812.

== Plot summary ==
Judith Taverner is a beautiful young heiress who comes to London to join high society. She takes an instant dislike to her unwilling guardian, Julian, fifth Earl of Worth, who, having met her earlier in a small town filled with bucks watching a boxing match, treats her with a familiarity reserved for loose women. Judith soon becomes a sensation in London. She gets many offers of marriage (including one from the Duke of Clarence). Worth does not permit her to marry any one of them. This initially makes Judith very angry, but she comes to appreciate it later. Judith has a younger brother named Peregrine (Perry) who is a young handsome boy with very little sense and a lot of money to spare. Hence, he is always getting into trouble. Perry and Judith's cousin Bernard Taverner seems always so kind and attentive, though there is little love lost between him and Worth.

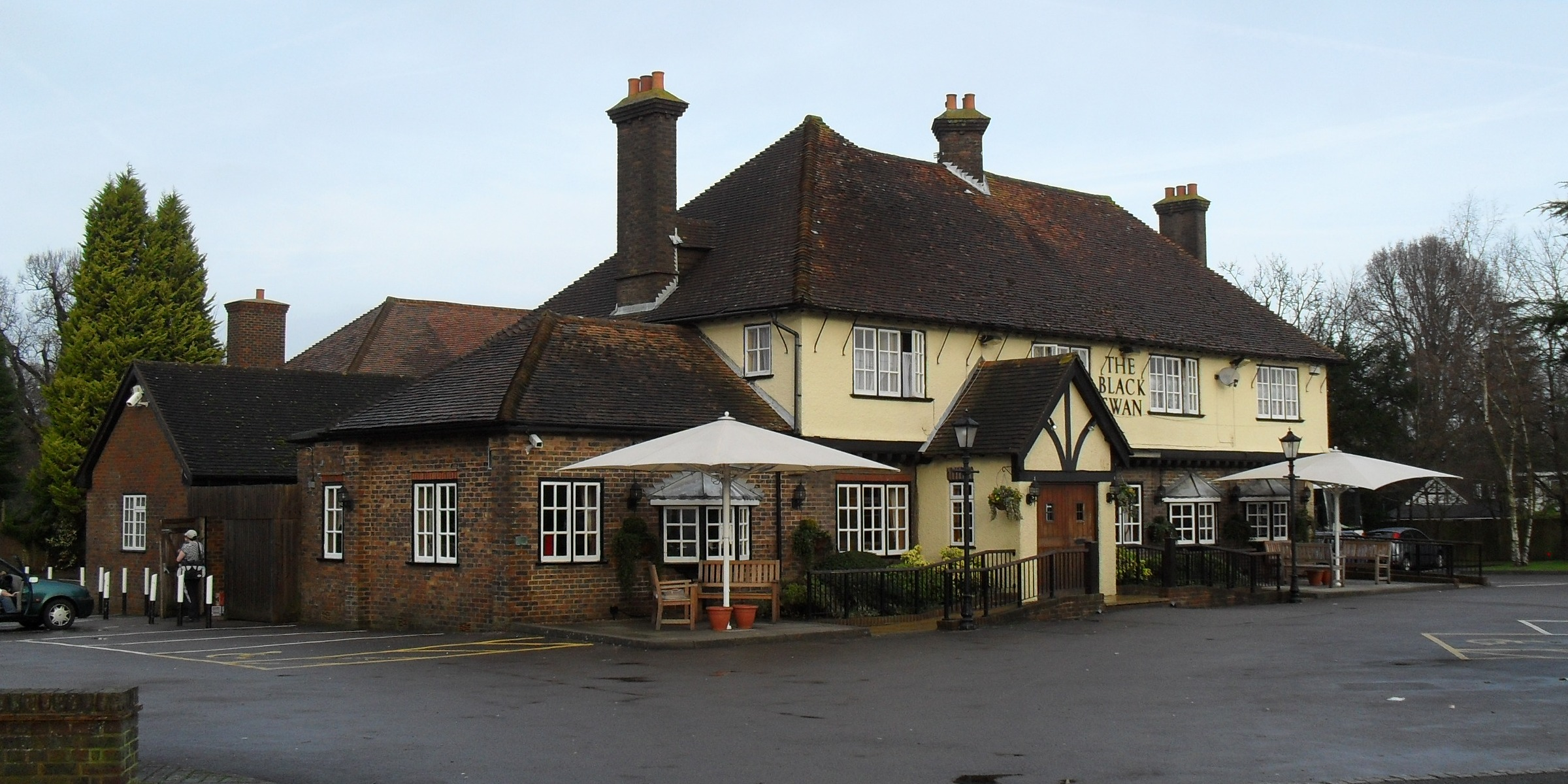
The Black Swan Inn, which stood beside the tollgate at Pease Pottage appears in Chapter XVI

Perry keeps getting into scrapes. He is challenged to a duel, gets held up, and nearly gets poisoned. Worth suspects that Bernard is the villain and he sends his brother, Captain the Hon. Charles Audley to watch over Perry. Meanwhile, Bernard tries to convince Judith that it is Worth who is the real culprit. In the end, after Worth provokes Taverner into acting, the truth comes out and Bernard is shown to be the guilty one.

The sparring and eventual love affair of Judith and Julian, against the backdrop of Judith's brother Peregrine's romance and danger, make up this novel.

Miss Heyer's An Infamous Army is a sequel to Regency Buck.
