= Jennifer Kloester =

Biographer

Jennifer Kloester is an Australian-born writer, particularly known for her work on Georgette Heyer.

== Life ==
Jennifer Kloester was born in the Australian city of Melbourne. After marrying her husband Barry, with whom she was to have three children, she moved with him to the mining town of Tabubil in Papua New Guinea and later to Bahrain. During this time she studied off-campus for a degree from Deakin University and then undertook her PhD degree at the University of Melbourne, with a thesis on which her first book was based. This was Georgette Heyer's Regency World, an exploration of the historical, social and cultural setting of Heyer's regency romances, published by Heinemann in 2005. Further research led to the publication of Kloester's 2011 Georgette Heyer: Biography of a Bestseller.

Later Kloester proposed to English Heritage the blue plaque for Heyer's birthplace in Wimbledon, which was unveiled in 2015. Further fruits of her research were two short story collections. Having discovered three 'lost' Regency stories published by Heyer in the later 1930s, she added these to the eleven short stories collected in her previous Pistols for Two (1960) and republished them all in the composite Snowdrift and Other Stories (Heinemann, 2016). A further collection of Heyer's 'contemporary' stories from the early 1920s was published as Acting on Impulse (Overlord Publishing, 2019), edited by Kloester with Rachel Hyland.

Kloester has also written fiction in her own right. Her books include two Young Adult novels, The Cinderella Moment and The Rapunzel Dilemma, published by Penguin Australia in 2013 and 2014, followed by the paranormal Jane Austen's Ghost (Overlord Publishing, 2019). Her latest work is the study The Novels of Georgette Heyer – A Celebration (Overlord Publishing, 2023).
