= Steele Savage =

American illustrator

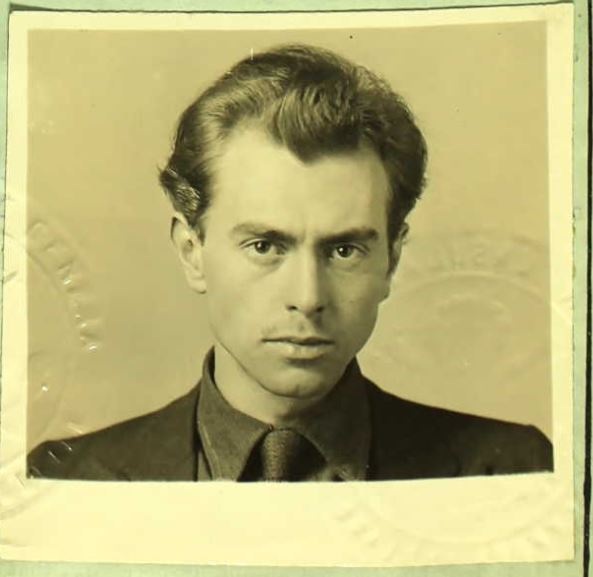
Harry Steele Savage in 1923

Harry Steele Savage (1898–1970) was an American illustrator, primarily of books for children and young adults.

== Professional career ==
Savage was born on December 21, 1898, in Central Lake, Michigan to Irish and French Canadian immigrants, Flora (McLaughlin) and William Harry Savage. The earliest known reference to Savage's life as an artist comes from his World War 1 draft card, where he lists his occupation as artist for the J.L. Hudson Company in Detroit, Michigan. He is probably best known for the illustrations in Edith Hamilton's Mythology. Other books he illustrated include Burton's The Arabian Nights (Bennett Cerf, 1932, Triangle Books), Stories of the Gods and Heroes by Sally Benson, Hurlbut's Story of the Bible (Revised edition), The Rainbow Book of Bible Stories by J. Harold Gwynne (1956), Life in the Ancient World by Bart Keith Winer (1961), and The Golden Library Book of Bible Stories by Jonathan Braddock. He drew several posters and covers for science fiction books and magazines that appeared in the 1960s and 1970s. He was also an illustrator of World War II era posters such as the recruiting poster: For Your Country's Sake Today, For Your Own Sake Tomorrow

== Notable cover art ==
- 1940 - No Other Man
- 1967 - Golden Blood
- 1967 - The Well of the Unicorn
- 1969 - Breakthrough
- 1969 - Stand on Zanzibar
- 1970 - Between Planets
- 1970 - The Rolling Stones
- 1970 - The Sorcerer's Skull
- 1970 - The Star Beast
- 1970 - Time for the Stars
- 1970 - Starbreed
- 1970 - The Long Result
- 1970 - The Squares of the City
- 1970 - The Whole Man
- 1970 - Anti-Man
- 1970 - The Citadel of Fear
- 1970 - Black in Time
- 1970 - Report of Probability A
- 1970 - Tunnel in the Sky
- 1970 - Barrier World
- 1970 - Rocket Ship Galileo
- 1971 - Red Planet
- 1971 - Have Space Suit Will Travel
