= 1968 in science fiction =

The year 1968 was marked, in science fiction, by the following events.

== Births and deaths ==
=== Births ===
- Vox Day
- Laurent Genefort
- Sergey Lukyanenko
- Chris Moriarty
- Van Allen Plexico
- Justina Robson
- Tricia Sullivan
- Howard Tayler
- Travis S. Taylor
- Jeff VanderMeer

=== Deaths ===
- Anthony Boucher (b. 1911)
- Groff Conklin (b. 1904)
- Clare Winger Harris (b. 1891)
- Eric North (b. 1884) (pseudonym of Bernard Cronin)
- Arthur Sellings (b. 1911)
- Harl Vincent (b. 1893)

== Literary releases ==
=== Novels ===
- 2001: A Space Odyssey by Arthur C. Clarke
- Camp Concentration by Thomas M. Disch
- Do Androids Dream of Electric Sheep? by Philip K. Dick
- The Final Programme by Michael Moorcock
- A Gift from Earth by Larry Niven
- The Goblin Reservation by Clifford D. Simak
- Hawksbill Station by Robert Silverberg
- The Heaven Makers by Frank Herbert
- His Master's Voice by Stanisław Lem
- Into the Slave Nebula by John Brunner
- The Lion of Comarre and Against the Fall of Night by Arthur C. Clarke
- The Masks of Time by Robert Silverberg
- Nova by Samuel R. Delany
- Past Master by R. A. Lafferty
- Report on Probability A by Brian Aldiss
- Rite of Passage by Alexei Panshin
- The Santaroga Barrier by Frank Herbert
- Stand on Zanzibar by John Brunner
- Star Quest by Dean Koontz

=== Short stories ===
- "Nightwings" (novella) by Robert Silverberg
- "The Sharing of Flesh" (novette) by Poul Anderson, winner of the 1969 Hugo Award for Best Novelette
- "Time Considered as a Helix of Semi-Precious Stones" by Samuel R. Delany, winner of the Hugo Award for Best Short Story in 1970

== Movies ==
| Title | Director | Cast | Country | Subgenre/Notes |
|---|---|---|---|---|
| 2001: A Space Odyssey | Stanley Kubrick | Keir Dullea, Gary Lockwood, William Sylvester | United Kingdom; United States | Adventure (Note: Won an Academy Award for Visual Effects and a Hugo Award for Best Dramatic Presentation.) |
| The Astro-Zombies | Ted V. Mikels | Wendell Corey, John Carradine, Tom Pace | United States | Horror |
| Barbarella | Roger Vadim | Jane Fonda, John Phillip Law, Anita Pallenberg | France; Italy | Adventure Comedy Fantasy |
| Brides Of Blood | Eddie Romero | John Ashley, Kent Taylor, Beverly Hills, Eva Darren | Philippines | |
| The Bamboo Saucer (aka Collision Course (1969) | Frank Telford | Dan Duryea, John Ericson, Lois Nettleton | United States | |
| Charly | Ralph Nelson | Cliff Robertson, Claire Bloom | United States | Drama Romance (Note: Winner of an Academy Award for Best Actor.) |
| Destroy All Monsters (a.k.a. Kaijû sôshingeki) | Ishirō Honda | Akira Kubo, Jun Tazaki, Yoshio Tsuchiya | Japan | Action Adventure kaijū |
| Gamera vs. Viras (a.k.a. Gamera tai uchu kaijû Bairasu) | Noriaki Yuasa | Kôjirô Hongô Tôru Takatsuka Carl Craig | Japan | Action Aventure Famille |
| Goke, Body Snatcher from Hell (a.k.a. Kyuketsuki Gokemidoro) | Hajime Sato | Teruo Yoshida, Tomomi Sato, Eizo Kitamura, Hideo Ko | Japan | Horror |
| The Green Slime | Kinji Fukasaku | Robert Horton, Luciana Paluzzi, Richard Jaeckel | Japan; United States | Drama Horror |
| Je t'aime, je t'aime | Alain Resnais | Claude Rich, Olga Georges-Picot, Anouk Ferjac | France | Drama |
| Mission Mars | Nicholas Webster | Darren McGavin, Nick Adams, George de Vries, Shirley Parker | United States | |
| Planet of the Apes | Franklin J. Schaffner | Charlton Heston, Roddy McDowall, Kim Hunter, Maurice Evans | United States | Adventure |
| The Power | Byron Haskin | George Hamilton, Suzanne Pleshette, Richard Carlson | United States | Thriller |
| Project X | William Castle | Christopher George, Greta Baldwin, Henry Jones | United States | Mystery |
| Thunderbird 6 | David Lane | Keith Alexander (voice), Sylvia Anderson (voice), John Carson (voice) | United Kingdom | Marionette Action Adventure Drama Family |
| Voyage to the Planet of Prehistoric Women | Peter Bogdanovich | Mamie Van Doren, Mary Marr, Paige Lee | United States | Adventure |

== Awards ==
Hugo

- Lord of Light by Roger Zelazny won the 1968 Hugo Award (novel).

Nebula

- Rite of Passage by Alexei Panshin won the 1968 Nebula Award (novel).

== See also ==
- 1968 in science
