= Muddle =

Muddle may refer to:

- Mr. Muddle, one of the Mr. Men from the children's book series by Roger Hargreaves
- MDL (programming language), the Lisp-derived language that Zork was first written in
- MUDDL, a programming language originally created for the first Multi-User Dungeon (MUD) by Richard Bartle and Roy Trubshaw
- Mudlle, a programming language originally created for the MUD MUME by David Gay and Gustav Hållberg
- Muddle (cricketer), an English cricketer for Kent, active 1768

== See also ==
- Muddler, a bartender's tool
- Muddle Earth, a children's book by Paul Stewart
- Muddle Earth (John Brunner)
- Muddling spoon
