= Franco Grignani =

Franco Grignani (February 4, 1908 – 20 February 1999) was an Italian architect, graphic designer and artist. He is best known for black and white graphics, particularly the Woolmark logo, which was voted 'Best Logo of all Time' by Creative Review Magazine in 2011.

Grignani was born in Pieve Porto Morone, Italy. He studied architecture in Turin between 1929 and 1933. Early on, he began experimenting with photography, and became interested in optic and visual phenomena. He played a part in Italy's second Futurist and Constructivist movements. Subsequently, his work was more closely associated with Kinetic Art and Op Art. Based on theories of perception, particularly the psychology of form, using his knowledge of architecture, he created more than 14000 experimental works. He remains a powerful influence in the world of graphic design. In Italy, he is considered a master of optical graphic design.

== Early career ==
During the 1930s he founded Studio Grignani, designing advertising for clients such as Fratelli Borletti, Fiat, Domus, Dompé, Mondadori, Montecatini, and Alfieri & Lacroix for whom he designed numerous campaigns.

He experimented in the fields of photography and photomontage. In 1952 he created a new corporate identity for Arti Grafiche Alfieri & Lacroix in Milan, to which he added designs for 150 posters. His work was exhibited in contemporary art exhibitions such as Documenta III in 1964, alongside the work of Jasper Johns, Francis Bacon, Anthony Caro and others. Grignani worked as Art Director at Bellezza d'Italia and became art director for Pubblicita in Italia annuals in 1956, where he continued for 26 years. He was a member of the juries of "Typomundus 20/2" and the Warsaw Poster Biennial in 1970. He had more than 49 solo exhibitions from 1958, in various countries, including the United Kingdom, Switzerland, Germany, the US and Venezuela. In 1959 he won the Palma d’Oro for advertising and the gold medal at the Milan Triennale. In 1965 he took part in "Vision 65", the first World Congress on New Challenges to Human Communication, held at the Southern Illinois University in Carbondale. In 1966 he received an award at the Warsaw Poster Biennial and another at the Venice Biennale in 1972. In 1967 he won the Typomundus 20, awarded by the International Centre for the Typographic Arts in New York to Alfieri & Lacroix. His work is displayed in international museums including MoMa in New York, the Stedelijk Museum of Amsterdam and the Victoria and Albert Museum in London. He wrote various essays and taught both in Italy and the U.S.A.

== Research and Optics ==
Grignani’s projects are based on continuous research and experimentation in visual perception and the creative use of graphic and photographic media. His work was often in black and white, crisply rigorous and precise. Early in his career he started playing with perception, experimenting with photo montages, frames, drawings and overlays. He focused on eliciting emotion from viewers through direct interventions of the image, distorting the plastically shaped using twist, rotation, warping and splits, or the dynamic, through progression, acceleration, and perspective reversals exchange.

== The Power of Graphic Design ==
”To affirm its useful role in visual communication, graphic art must rely on a large number of experiments in order to achieve perfect freedom, facing the routine daily activities.” Grignani believed in the significance of graphic art and its impact, both conscious and subconscious, on daily life. Grignani pushed the entire field forward through experimental work which often breached the boundaries of physicality and psychology. About the design of Logos he said: "The drawing of a logo for a designer is the most […] exciting assignment, because in that symbol he tries to pour all his graphic sensitivity."

== The Woolmark Logo ==
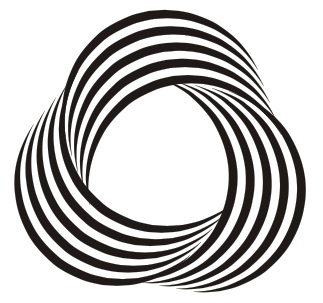

Grignani's best-known work is the Woolmark logo, applied to more than five billion products worldwide. In 1963 the International Wool Secretariat (now Australian Wool Innovation) launched an international competition for a visual design that would represent new standards of quality and help build consumer confidence. There is some doubt as to whether the winning design was by Grignani himself, as he later claimed; he was a member of the jury and could not use his own name, and is thought to have used the pseudonym "Francesco Saroglia". His daughters claimed, after his death, that the entry had been submitted on his behalf by a Mr. Spiriti, an owner of an advertising agency, who had asked him to provide some sample sketches. Shortly afterwards, the artist was invited to participate as a juror and was amazed to see his own drawing among the entries. His daughter stated that he tried voting against it as the winning design because he was embarrassed. His sketchbook of Monday 4 April that year reveal a page of precise sketches for the Woolmark logo, including the winning entry, and this page was exhibited in a show of Franco Grignani's work in 1995 at the Aiap Gallery in Milan.

The Woolmark Company commented that the logo "has helped reinvent the global perception of wool as a natural, contemporary and glamorous fibre". The flexible and elegant form, similar to a Möbius strip, is cited as portraying the quality of wool and expressing its softness and purity in a uniquely memorable image.

== Penguin Sci-Fi Book Covers ==
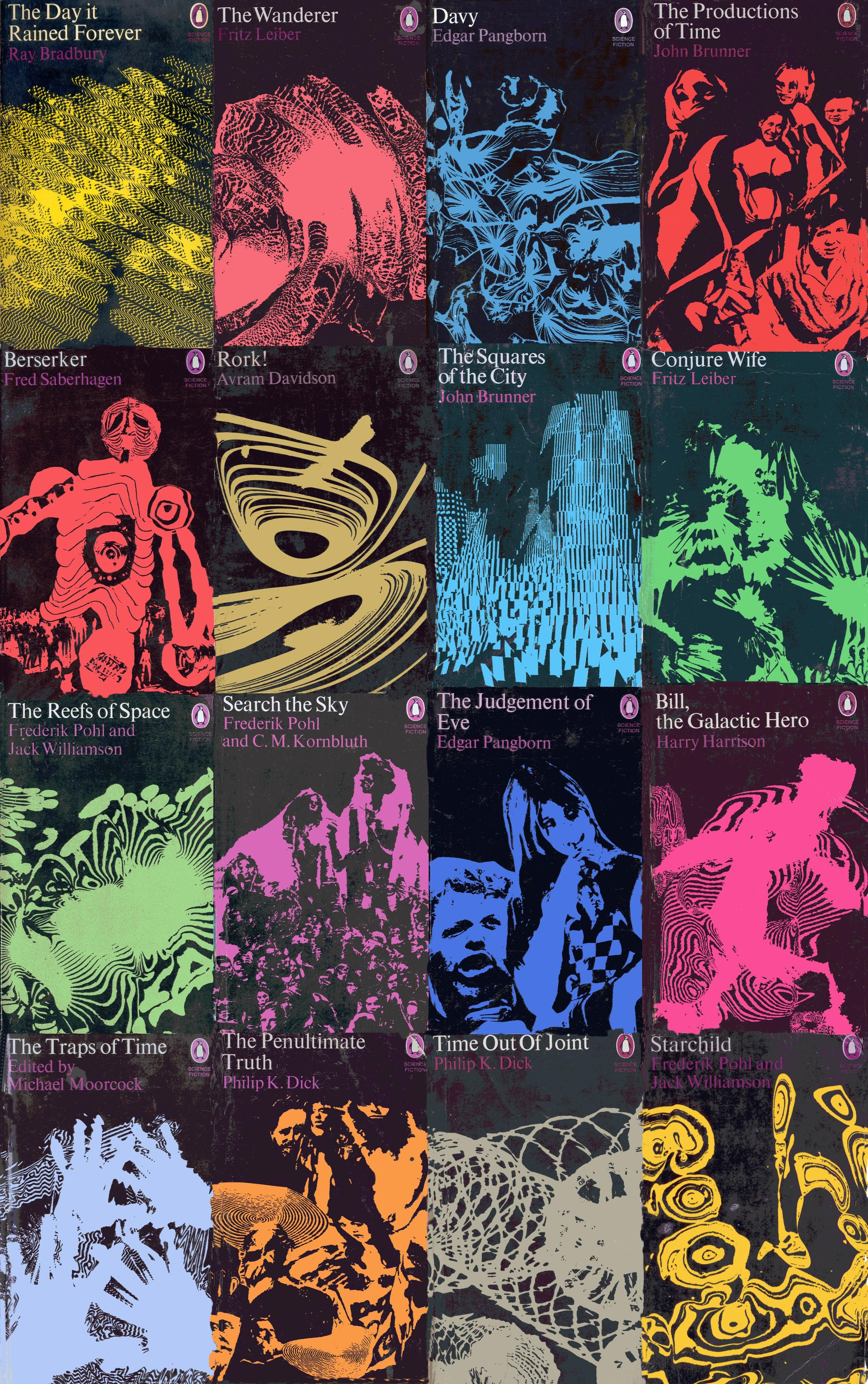

In 1968, Penguin's new art director for fiction, David Pelham, commissioned Franco Grignani to create a set of sixteen covers for a Sci-Fi mini-series in 1969-70.

- The Day it Rained Forever by Ray Bradbury
- The Wanderer by Fritz Leiber
- Davy by Edgar Pangborn
- Rork! by Avram Davidson
- The Reefs of Space by Frederik Pohl and Jack Williamson
- Bill, the Galactic Hero by Harry Harrison
- The Squares of the City by John Brunner
- Time Out of Joint by Philip K. Dick
- Conjure Wife by Fritz Leiber
- Search the Sky by Frederik Pohl and C.M. Kornbluth
- Starchild by Frederik Pohl and Jack Williamson
- The Penultimate Truth by Philip K. Dick
- Berserker by Fred Saberhagen
- The Judgement of Eve by Edgar Pangborn
- The Traps of Time, edited by Michael Moorcock
- The Productions of Time by John Brunner

== Solo exhibitions ==
More than two hundred Art and Graphics exhibitions featured Grignani's work during his lifetime. The list of his solo shows does not include the large number of group shows in which his work was included. His experimental works and creations are still present in the collections of the MoMA in New York, the Stedelijk in Amsterdam, the Museum of Modern Art in Warsaw, and the Victoria and Albert Museum in London, as well as the MACBA in Buenos Aires and the MACC in Caracas. The first Grignani solo show was held at the Crawford Gallery in London in 1958.

- "Franco Grignani", Crawford Gallery, London, 1958
- "Fade Experiments", Libreria Salto, Milan, 1958
- "Franco Grignani", Milan Public Library, Milan, 1958
- "Visual Tension", Galleria Salto, Milan, 1960
- "Franco Grignani", Normandy House, Chicago, 1960
- "Franco Grignani", Conservatorio Musicale Cherubini, Florence, 1965
- "Franco Grignani", Container Corporation of America Gallery, Chicago, 1965
- "Franco Grignani", Galleria il Cenobio, Milan, 1966
- "Franco Grignani", Centro Proposte, Palazzo Capponi, Florence, 1966
- "Franco Grignani", 500 D Gallery, Chicago, 1966
- "Franco Grignani", Studio di informazione estetica, Turin, 1966
- "Franco Grignani", Galleria l'Elefante, Venice, 1966
- "Franco Grignani", Galleria Flaviana, Locarno, 1966
- "Franco Grignani", Staatiche Verkkunstschule Kassel, Kassel, 1967
- "Franco Grignani", Galleria il Paladino, Palermo, 1967
- "Franco Grignani", 18 years of research, Grattacielo Pirelli, Milan, 1967
- "Franco Grignani", Galleria Il Punto, Turin, 1967
- "Franco Grignani", Galleria Behr, Stoccarda, 1968
- "The found geometry of Franco Grignani", Studio 2B, Bergamo, 1968
- "Franco Grignani", Galleria L'Elefante, Venice, 1968
- "Franco Grignani", Galleria San Fedele, Milan, 1969
- "Franco Grignani", Galleria La Colonna, Como, 1969
- "Franco Grignani", Galleria L'Arco, Macerata, 1969
- "The Two Realities", Galleria Il Brandale, Savona, 1969
- "Franco Grignani", Catalan and Balearic Architecture College, Barcellona, 1969
- "Franco Grignani", Galleria Lorenzelli, Bergamo, 1970
- "Franco Grignani", Galleria Rizzoli, Rome, 1970
- "Franco Grignani", Galleria L'Arco, Rome, 1970
- "Franco Grignani", 500D Gallery, Chicago, 1970
- "Franco Grignani", Galleria Peccolo, Livorno, 1971
- "Franco Grignani", Galleria San Fedele, Milan, 1971
- "Franco Grignani", Galleria Il Segnapassi, Pesaro, 1971
- "Franco Grignani", Istituto di Cultura en Uruguay, Montevideo, 1971
- "Franco Grignani", solo show at 1° Review of National Contemporary Art in Saint Vincent, 1972
- "Franco Grignani", Galleria Marini, Verona, 1972
- "Franco Grignani", Galleria Lorenzelli, Milan, 1973
- "Franco Grignani", Galleria Trinità, Rome, 1973
- "Franco Grignani, Art as experiment and method", Galleria Marcon IV, Rome, 1974
- "Franco Grignani", Galleria Andromeda, Bologna, 1974
- "Franco Grignani", Galleria Lorenzelli, Bergamo, 1974
- "An Optic Methodology", Rotonda della Besana, Milan, 1975
- "Franco Grignani", Galleria Novelli, Verona, 1975
- "Franco Grignani", Galleria Lorenzelli, Milan, 1976
- "Franco Grignani", Galleria Cesarea, Genova, 1976
- "Franco Grignani", Galleria Marcon IV, Rome, 1976
- "Franco Grignani", Galleria Ravagnan, Venice, 1976
- "Franco Grignani", Studio d'Arte Il Moro, Florence, 1977
- "Franco Grignani", Museo de Bellas Artes, Caracas, 1977
- "Franco Grignani. Paint, Experiment and Graphic Design", Public Exhibition Hall, Reggio Emilia, 1979
- "Franco Grignani", Galleria Il Cortile, Bologna, 1979
- "Research as Art – Franco Grignani, experimentals, paintings, graphics", Cultural Centre, Sesto San Giovanni, 1980
- "Symbols and Structure", Galleria Spazia, Bologna, 1981
- "Hyperbolic Structures", Galleria Lorenzelli, Milan, 1981
- "Experimental Photography in the '30s e '70s", Galleria d'Arte Moderna, Bologna, 1983
- "Photo Graphics of Franco Grignani, 50 years of research as Art. Creativity and methodology", Municipal Sports Hall, Pieve Porto Morone, Pavia, 1983
- "Franco Grignani", Centro Verifica 8+1, Venezia-Mestre, 1984
- "Experimental Communication TYPE", Galleria Quanta, Milan, 1984
- "Franco Grignani", Maison Gerbollier, La Salle, Aosta, 1985
- "From Moiré to Hyperbolic Structures", Galleria Il Salotto, Como, 1985
- "Historic Works", Galleria Vismara, Milan, 1986
- "Franco Grignani", Visual Culture Centre Koh-I-Noor, Milan, 1986
- "Symbiotic Structures", Galleria Lorenzelli Arte, Milan, 1988
- "Research as Profession, Graphics as Research", Galleria Mara Coccia, Rome, 1988
- "Franco Grignani", Galleria Arte Struktura, Milan, 1988
- "Ambiguous Reality, Documentary works from 1928 to 1988", Galleria Arte Struktura, Milan, 1989
- "Franco Grignani", 30 Jahre Galerie Loehr, Frankfurt, 1990
- "Franco Grignani - Just a different repetition", Galleria Arte Struktura, Milan, 1991
- "Franco Grignani - The Symbol in the Eye", Accademia di Belle Arti di Brera, Milan, 1997
