= The Sheep Look Up =

1972 dystopian sci-fi novel by British author John Brunner

- Cover of first edition (hardcover)
- Author: John Brunner
- Cover artist: Mark Rubin and Irving Freeman, Plum Studio
- Language: English
- Genre: Science fiction, dystopian
- Publisher: Harper & Row
- Publication date: August 1972
- Publication place: United States
- Media type: Print (hardback and paperback)
- Pages: 461
- ISBN: 0-06-010558-5
- OCLC: 447474
- Dewey Decimal: 823/.9/14
- LC Class: PZ4.B89 Sh PR6052.R8

The Sheep Look Up is a 1972 dystopian science fiction novel by British author John Brunner, dealing with the deterioration of the environment in the United States. It was nominated for the 1972 Nebula Award for Best Novel.

The novel is the third in Brunner's "Club of Rome Quartet", each novel dealing with a separate social issue. The Sheep Look Up explores a future dystopia occurring as a result of rampant consumerism and pollution. It follows 1968's Stand on Zanzibar (overpopulation), 1969's The Jagged Orbit (racial tension and violence) and precedes 1975's The Shockwave Rider (technology and future shock).

== Background ==
The novel takes place in a very near future United States, not dated explicitly but clearly as near as the late 1970s. (Note: Austin Train's biographic entry (December section, chapter "Entrained") gives his birth as 1938 and his last publication 1975, shortly before he went into hiding. Soon after ("The Moral of the Twentieth Century") he admits to being "Nearly forty" (and born in Aries, i. e. early spring). In the same scene "The president of the United States is sixty-six", just like Ronald Reagan, whom the novel's "Prexy" caricatures in broad brushstrokes. Later it is reiterated that Train's 1975 bestseller was "three years or so ago" (January, "Earthmover"). The most recent date is a poem from the fictional "Our Father Which Art in Washington, 1978" opening November. In December / "House to House", one of Angel City managers discussing the need to adapt to the upcoming changes says "I'd go straight into scrap-reclamation and sewage-plant construction. They're the growth industries of the eighties. You'll see your investment double in no time.") Human activities have resulted in wholesale destruction of the environment.

Water pollution is so severe that "don't drink" notices are frequently issued, water taps in public toilets are coin-operated and household water filters are popular. Air pollution has reached the point that people in urban areas cannot go outside without "filtermasks". Such fumes left behind by aircraft cause air sickness in planes trailing behind. California is blanketed by a thick layer of smog that prevents the sun from shining through. Acid rain forces people to cover themselves in plastic so that their clothes are not ruined. The sea has become so polluted and the beaches so strewn with garbage that Americans now vacation in the mountains. Environmentally minded people drive electric or "steam cars" with clean exhaust, but these in turn become target of their haters.

Coastal waters are mostly covered by a stinking, oily film made up of sewage, detergents, industrial effluent, and cellulose microfibers. The Mediterranean Sea is poisoned beyond recovery, which leads to famine, refugee waves, civil unrest and even wars in Europe and Africa. "… we killed the Great Lakes. They're in a fair way to killing the Baltic, with help from the Russians who have already killed the Caspian." The use of defoliants and herbicides created "the Mekong Desert" or dustbowl. The heavy use of chemicals has made large swathes of farmland unsuitable for growing anything, resulting in high food prices.

Many animal species and surface sea fish are on the brink of extinction, and birds are not as common as before, the bald eagle dead for years. Overuse of antibiotics has created a host of resistant bacteria and infections are rampant. Household pests have also developed pesticide resistance, and a new type of worms destroying all crops, known as Jigras, causes food shortages.

Several years ago there had been attempts to rein in the destruction with Environmental Acts, but these are weak, formalistic and made little difference. Even so, a Republican Senator claims that "chlorophyll addicts are hamstringing American business … by insisting that our manufacturers comply with regulations ignored by foreign competition."

Crime and unrest, both civil and racial are growing. Travel abroad is discouraged because of terrorist attacks on planes, and fewer and fewer people graduate with science, engineering, or business management degrees, as agriculture and food-related degrees are most in demand and most likely to lead to emigration from the US. Poverty is growing while the decreasing number of wealthy people enclose themselves in walled communities guarded by armed mercenaries.

The right-wing administration is indifferent to those problems. The President, known as Prexy, is a vulgar, populist former actor who can only offer snappy soundbites in response to various disasters. After poisonings, famine and unrest become rampant, the government scapegoats Honduran Tupamaro rebels and puts the US under martial law, resorting to violence and oppression to silence its critics.

The US had been defeated in several wars in Asia, similar to the Vietnam War, which was nearing its end when the novel was written. Many men (increasingly not just young ones) dodge the draft despite frequent crackdowns. The latest intervention in Honduras is hampered first by American soldiers coming down with an epidemic and then by the need for troops to quell unrest in the United States.

A growing, unorganised group of citizens and activists turn to environmental terrorism to stop the corporations from spoiling the Earth. They are called Trainites after Austin Train, an environmental scientist and popular writer who despite predicting and interpreting social change, has become disillusioned by society's failure to listen and had to go into hiding. (He himself prefers to call the movement "commensalism", though this led to abbreviation/slur "commies".) His character is used to drive the plot and to explain the backstory to the reader.

== Plot ==
"The Sheep Look Up" takes place over the course of a year (December to November), with each part or chapter depicting one month. The story is a multi-strand one, involving a variety of characters whose paths cross as the world's ecological disaster brings them together.

December The novel starts with a man running across the Santa Monica Freeway and getting killed by a car. The traffic jam delays Philip Mason, a Denver-based executive at the Angel City insurance company, for a meeting. The company will have to increase life insurance premiums because of the declining life expectancy in the US. — Peg Mankiewicz, a journalist, identifies the dead as her friend Decimus Jones. Later, Peg meets with her and Decimus's friend, influential ecologist Austin Train. He has gone underground, working as a mall Santa. — In Honduras, a group of UN investigators is looking into a famine nation ridden by civil war. They examine a ruined coffee farm and discover mysterious wormlike insects destroying the plants. They are known as Jigras and are immune to every known insecticide, which the owner had been using on them for years. — Jacob Bamberley, an oil heir and head of Bamberley Trust, a charitable institution that manufactures Nutripon, a hydroponically grown cassava product to provide relief in places afflicted by famine, gives his adopted son Hugh Pettingill a tour of the factory in Denver. — In African town Noshri, devastated by a war caused by the Mediterranean famine, the nurse Lucy Ramage has distributed a shipment of Nutripon when the locals seem to go insane and start murdering each other. She is saved by UN soldiers, who put down the riots.

January A supersonic airliner flying over the Rockies causes an avalanche with its sonic boom that destroys a brand-new ski resort in Towerhill, Colorado. A policeman Pete Goddard, becomes a hero after he saves a group of children trapped in the snow from being crushed by a steel beam. — Peg learns from an autopsy that Decimus had a psychedelic drug in his system. Knowing that he was not a drug user, she decides to get to the bottom of it even though losing her job. — Jacob, trying to debunk allegations that Nutripon was responsible for the violence at Noshri, is a guest on Petronella Page's popular talk show. She goads him to eat a bowlful but before he can, a bomb threat forces the studio to be evacuated in much panic and violence.

February In Ireland (whose cattle industry also suffers), Dr Michael Advowson is treating a young girl, badly infected playing on a farm that served as a garbage dump, and is called up to the United Nations investigation of Noshri. — Philip is diagnosed with gonorrhea from a one-night stand in Las Vegas and has exposed his wife. — Lucy finds herself in a mental hospital in England after she had been afflicted with the same insanity as the people of Noshri. She describes the horrors of the riots. — A similar occurrence happens in Honduras. — Hugh runs away from home after he confronts Jacob about his role in the Noshri disaster.

March Peg and Decimus's sister Felice drive to the Colorado commune that Decimus was a part of, known as the "wat", and pick up Hugh, whose car had broken down. They present the wat with a canister of imported earthworms. — A Honduran man from a boat on the heavily polluted Pacific sets off balloons carrying napalm that cause death and destruction all over San Diego. — Philip loses his job, the result of Angel City's woes from the Towerhill disaster. He is drawn into a business scheme by his friend Alan Prosser, who runs a plumbing firm, to sell household water filters manufactured by the Mitsuyama Corporation of Japan. Alan wants to use Pete Goddard as their spokesman to take advantage of his hero status. — Michael analyses the Nutripon at Noshri and discovers that it contained ergot, a substance known to cause hallucinations and dementia. Flying to New York, he meets Lucy who tells him her theory that the food was intentionally poisoned to weaken the governments of third world countries to allow the exploitation of their resources.

April Gerry Thorne, a Bamberley Trust executive, is at his home in the (still cleaner) Caribbean. His wife, out swimming, gets exposed to lewisite dumped into sea by the military after World War I and "one of these new deep-trawling fishing boats hauled a lot of it up". She dies, and Gerry naively vows to get justice. — Hugh is becoming accustomed to life at the wat, smoking marijuana with Pete's brother-in-law Carl Travers. They wind up making love. — In New York, Michael meets Jacob to discuss potential poisoning of Nutripon. Jacob wants Michael to certify the plant's new safety equipment. During the meeting, a Trainite car bomb goes off and destroys the office. — Mitsuyama sends Hideki Katsamura on a tour of the US as the company launches its water filters. Throughout the journey, Katsamura is afflicted with diarrhea. He winds up being patient zero for an outbreak of acute enteritis that ravages the country. It is left unstated whether it was an intentional poisoning to increase water filter sales.

May The epidemic hits America hard: 35 million people become infected. Many are unable to work; businesses are forced to run on skeleton crews; public services such as police, mass transit, and garbage collection are severely disrupted. — At the wat, it is discovered that Felice's worms included Jigras, which ruin the vegetable crop. The Jigras spread across the nation, resulting in a dire food shortage. — Jacob publicly swears to destroy his Nutripon inventory in a public relations exercise. — Hugh and Carl, having left the wat and wanting to take more serious action for the environment, meet a man calling himself Austin Train, one of many imposters.

June Michael arrives in Colorado to oversee the destruction of the Nutripon stocks by the Army. He meets some young people intent on eating it to get "a high that never stops" as this would be better than their life. When they besiege the compound in hundreds, Michael tries to defuse the situation by telling them that the food is clean, and gives them some to prove it; he is arrested by a US Colonel, and a riot breaks out. The army uses laser cannons, and 63 people die, Michael included. — Peg meets with Lucy and a man named Fernando Arriegas to discuss the Noshri incident. At gunpoint, they force Peg to eat contaminated Nutripon. She winds up tripping out, and mysterious men enter the hotel room and kill Lucy and Fernando. — Thorne meets Professor Quarrey and his wife to discuss whether he has a case against the State Department for his wife's death. The conversation goes into Puritan Foods, a company claiming to sell uncontaminated food and tied to an organized crime group called The Syndicate, but after careful analysis, Quarrey has found that Puritan is no better than regular food and that some of it must come from outside of North America, as the continent has too little uncontaminated farmland to grow all the food that it sells. They also discuss how the Jigras entered the United States. A worm importer in Texas passed them off as regular worms, which allowed them to get past inspection. As Thorne leaves, men show up at the apartment and kill him, Quarrey, and his wife.

July Jacob is confronted by his wife, Maud, who calls him a murderer for the poisonings of Noshri and Honduras. He angrily retreats to his study, where he eats a candy bar confiscated from one of his chronically ill children. He has a reaction due to a drug he is taking, falls out the window, and dies. — Trainites begin to resort to terrorism. They bomb gas stations, blow up a new highway interchange in Alabama, sabotage a lumber mill in Georgia, and murder loggers who are trying to cut down California's remaining Redwood trees. — Hugh, Carl, and the Austin Train impersonator they call Ossie plot to kidnap Hector Bamberley, the son of Roland and nephew of Jacob. Roland has become the West Coast distributor for Mitsuyama water filters, and Hugh, Carl and their compatriots want to extort him into giving them away for free. — Peg wakes up in a hospital and is questioned by a doctor, coerced by a federal agent, about her ties to Austin Train.

August The Mitsuyama water filters are discovered to be faulty and to clog up constantly with bacteria. Alan Prosser faces ruin with having to replace them. — In Colorado, there is a meeting of wat members from all over the country. They are discussing a report on Puritan Foods when a low flying aircraft firebombs the compound and kills many. — Hugh and Carl's friend Kitty, who owns the apartment in which they are living and keeping Hector, has sex with the latter. — Peg convinces Austin, who is now working as a garbageman, to go public. He agrees after she says that she can get him on the Petronella Page show. Page wants to "crucify" him, but she is won over to his cause. — After a major at a nuclear missile base in North Dakota suddenly goes crazy and almost murders his two kids, the government becomes convinced that the United States is under attack. Martial law begins to spread.

September Hugh, Carl, and Ossie are worried about Hector's health and have given up hope that Roland will pay the ransom; they let him go. Hector is ridden with diseases that are now common in urban slums, much to the disbelief of his wealthy father. Hector claims that he was kidnapped by Austin Train, who is arrested on the Petronella Page show. — At Prosser's offices, an employee suddenly goes on a violent rampage and is subdued by Alan's gun. Alan, Philip, Pete can see that is not an isolated case since outside the office, Denver residents have gone insane, just like in Noshri. In the chaos, Philip drives Pete home, but once he gets to his own apartment, his wife reveals that their son has viciously murdered his sister Jodie. Alan and his assistant Dorothy die trapped in the company's warehouse, which is set on fire.

October The Masons are holed up in their apartment for days with the rotting corpse of Jodie. Eventually, soldiers arrive and inform them that they are the first living people to be found in the building. Philip's friend and regular doctor, Doug McNeil, reveals that Denver's water supply has been contaminated with Ergot. Philip is told that he is being called to active duty as a soldier to supervise cleanup from the rioting. — Hugh wanders back to his home and finds out that Maud has gone insane. After falsely claiming to be reporting for duty, he is exposed and put on a work gang with other suspected Trainites. Peg comes across him, and he reveals that Carl had given Decimus Jones a carton of Nutripon as a Christmas present, which explains why he suddenly ran across a freeway.

November The US is on the brink of collapse. Ossie sets a bomb at a public building and dies from fever. — Philip is on patrol when another soldier who had fitted filters for him accuses him of poisoning the water (apparently influenced by the president's propaganda about inner enemies) and shoots him. — Pete surprises his pregnant wife with a microwave oven. Cooking, she collapses. At the hospital, Doug explains that brand is shoddily built: "Leaked some of its radiation … it literally cooked Jeannie's baby in her womb." At night, Carl discovers Pete scribbling notes from a book: "I'm learning how to build a bomb." — Peg is present at Austin's heavily televised trial. Hector quickly realizes that he was not kidnapped by the real Austin Train and reveals he had been coerced into identifying him from photographs. Austin is prepared to make a speech, pleading for humanity to stop destroying its environment. He also reveals the source of the Ergot poisonings: in 1963, the government stored drums of Ergot-based nerve gas in the mountains surrounding Denver. Just before Christmas, an injection induced earthquake caused the drum to rupture and to leak its contents into the water table supplying the Nutripon factory, contaminating the food. A later one caused a much larger leak, which poisoned the city. As he finishes his appeal, a cameraman informs him that the President had ordered to cut the broadcast. Ossie's bomb detonates, killing Austin and presumably others too. — An actuary at Angel City had been throughout the novel devising a computer simulation to figure out a solution to the world's ecological problems. He presents it at Petronella Page show, constantly interrupted by emergency announcements of doom: The Army starts "quelling civil disorder" in big cities; "the Niagara Falls Bridge is out – either blown or collapsed … so many people trying to get over the Canadian border". Finally he explains: "it's sort of ironical, because we're already engaged, in a sense, in the course of action my findings dictate. … We can just about restore the balance of the ecology, the biosphere, and so on […] live within our means instead of on an unrepayable overdraft, as we've been doing for the past half century – if we exterminate the two hundred million most extravagant and wasteful of our species." — The last scene takes place in Ireland: Advowson's ex-landlady is letting a doctor into her home. She smells dense smoke and suggests calling fire department. He responds, "The brigade would have a long way to go. It's from America. The wind's blowing that way.”

Next Year The final chapter is simply three lines from John Milton's poem Lycidas:

The hungry sheep look up, and are not fed,
But swol[le]n with wind and the rank mist they draw,
Rot inwardly, and foul contagion spread...

== Publication notes ==
Despite being considered one of Brunner's best, the novel fell out of print in early 1990s, even before his death. It was republished in 2003 by BenBella Books with a new cover by Bob Eggleton, foreword by David Brin and an afterword by environmentalist and social change theorist James John Bell. Brin's foreword attempts to ground the book in Brunner's time, and in the context of his other writings.

In the afterword, Bell treats the book almost as prophecy, drawing parallels between events in the book and subsequent real-world developments: "His words have a kind of Gnostic power embedded in them that gives his characters passage into our world," and notes that "Brunner's puppet of a president, affectionately called Prexy, is a dead ringer for our Dubya".

Writer William Gibson made a similar remark in a 2007 interview:

No one except possibly the late John Brunner, in his brilliant novel The Sheep Look Up, has ever described anything in science fiction that is remotely like the reality of 2007 as we know it.
