= Polymath (disambiguation) =

A polymath is a person (also known as Renaissance Person), whose expertise spans a significant number of different subject areas and who has extraordinarily broad and comprehensive knowledge.

Polymath may also refer to:

- Polymath (novel), 1974 novel by John Brunner
- The Polymath, a non-fiction book by Waqas Ahmed, first published 2018
- Polymath Park, resort in the Laurel Highlands of Pennsylvania, USA
- Polymath Project, a collaborative mathematics project
- Polymath (Game), Educational game made for kids.
