= Web of Everywhere =

1974 novel by John Brunner

- First edition
- Author: John Brunner
- Language: English
- Genre: Science fiction
- Publisher: Bantam Books
- Publication date: June 1974
- Publication place: USA
- Media type: Print (hardback and paperback)
- Pages: 148
- ISBN: 9780553089387
- OCLC: 858879

Web of Everywhere is a science fiction novel by British writer John Brunner, originally published in 1974 by Bantam Books in A Frederik Pohl Selection.

As in The Infinitive of Go, this novel revolves around a teleportation technology. Matter Transmission is a John Brunner's science fiction theme which originally appears in The Dreaming Earth (1963).
