= Telepathist =

Telepathist may refer to:

- Telepathy
- The Whole Man, novel by John Brunner
