= To Conquer Chaos =

1964 novel by John Brunner

- Cover of the first edition
- Author: John Brunner
- Language: English
- Genre: Science fiction
- Publisher: Ace Books
- Publication date: 1964
- Publication place: United States
- Media type: Print (Paperback)
- Pages: 192

To Conquer Chaos is a 1964 science fiction novel by English writer John Brunner. Its plot follows the "Desolation", which is a 150-kilometer-diameter area devoid of all life. Only small, isolated villages survive, far from each other. Monstrous and far-from-peaceful-life forms emerge from this desolate land. Some people have visions that seem to indicate that the center of the Desolation contains the remains of an ancient civilization. A brave expedition and a boy with visions discover that at the center of the Desolation is an organic computer that malfunctioned 500 years earlier. Once the computer is rebooted, all life on Earth begins to return to normal.
