= The Stardroppers =

1963 novel by John Brunner

- Cover of first edition (paperback)
- Author: John Brunner
- Cover artist: Jack Gaughan
- Language: English
- Genre: Science fiction
- Publisher: DAW Books
- Publication date: 1972
- Publication place: United Kingdom
- Media type: Print (paperback)

The Stardroppers is a science fiction novel by British writer John Brunner. It was originally published at novella-length in 1962 as Listen, the Stars, in Analog and then as part of an Ace Double in 1963; in 1972 the revised, novel-length form was published by DAW Books.

== Plot introduction ==
The Stardroppers is about an undercover United Nations agent investigating a new fad, "stardropping", whereby physics-violating equipment is used to listen to sounds believed to be alien or paranormal signals. Superficially a harmless but expensive hobby, stardropping attracts a fanaticism resembling addiction, where some users assemble in semi-social communes and spend all of their money on increasingly improved equipment. The fad gains an additional aspect of risk when users begin disappearing into thin air, in cases of increasing profile and witnessing.

== Reception ==
Lester del Rey characterized the novel as "a good adventure story [but] not of one Brunner's stronger literary efforts."
