= A Maze of Stars =

1991 novel by John Brunner

- First edition
- Author: John Brunner
- Cover artist: John Berkey
- Language: English
- Genre: Science fiction novel
- Publisher: Ballantine's Del Rey Books
- Publication date: 1991
- Publication place: United States
- Pages: 393 (first edition)
- ISBN: 0-345-36541-0
- OCLC: 23220943

A Maze of Stars (ISBN 0-345-36541-0) is a science fiction novel by John Brunner. It was first published in the United States by Ballantine Del Rey Books in 1991. It tells the story of a great sentient ship charged with protecting human settlements on other worlds.
