= The Tides of Time =

1984 novel by John Brunner

- First edition
- Author: John Brunner
- Cover artist: Don Dixon
- Language: English
- Subject: Time travel
- Genre: Science fiction novel
- Publisher: Ballantine's Del Rey Books
- Publication date: 1984
- Publication place: United States
- Pages: 235 (first edition)
- ISBN: 0-345-31838-2
- OCLC: 11648120

The Tides of Time (ISBN 0-345-31838-2) is a science fiction novel by John Brunner. It was first published in the United States by Ballantine Del Rey Books in 1984.

== Plot summary ==
The novel tells the story of two people on an isolated island. Every morning, they wake to a different life in a different time, and not always one that seems like the "real" past.

== Reception ==
Dave Langford reviewed The Tides of Time for White Dwarf #78, and stated that "Brunner's philosophical contention probably needs a whole book. Here it gets about 30 pages, and it's a tribute to his skill that he keeps you reading until then."

== Reviews ==
- Review by Bob Collins (1984) in Fantasy Review, December 1984
- Review by Richard E. Geis (1985) in Science Fiction Review, Spring 1985
- Review by Robert Coulson (1985) in Amazing Stories, May 1985
- Review by Tom Easton (1985) in Analog Science Fiction/Science Fact, July 1985
- Review by Roland J. Green (1986) in Far Frontiers, Volume IV/Winter 1985
- Review by David Willis (1986) in Paperback Inferno, #61
- Review [German] by Michael Nagula (1988) in Das Science Fiction Jahr Ausgabe 1988
- Review by Peter T. Garratt (1989) in Interzone, #32 November–December 1989
