= Entry to Elsewhen =

Short story collection by John Brunner

First edition (publ. DAW Books) cover art by Jack Gaughan

Entry to Elsewhen is a collection of science fiction short stories by John Brunner, published in 1972. It contains the following stories:

- "Host Age" first appeared in New Worlds in 1955.
- "Lungfish" first appeared in Britain in Science Fantasy in 1957.
- "No Other Gods But Me" first appeared in what the acknowledgments page of this book describes as a "shorter and substantially different form" as "A Time To Rend" in Science Fantasy in 1958. The version included in Entry to Elsewhen was written in 1966 and first appears in this collection.

The above attributions notwithstanding, the book's acknowledgments page notes that "All three stories have been completely revised by the author for the present book."

== Host Age ==
The first story takes place in what appears to be the relatively near future. Set in London, it deals with the appearance and spread of a mysterious new plague. The plague defies all efforts to treat it or stop its spread, showing varied symptoms in different victims and mutating rapidly. A sinister aspect soon appears when scientists making progress in fighting the plague are repeatedly sabotaged by unknown people. Also, the plague seems to be spread by multiple "Typhoid Marys", found unconscious on trains with large amounts of cash but no identifying information.

Eventually it is discovered that the plague is being spread by human military forces who have travelled through time from several centuries in the future. The head of this group explains that the plague was developed by an aggressive alien species with the purpose of destroying humanity. The plague's effectiveness derives in part from atrophied immune systems resulting from long-term prevention of exposure to any infectious agent. Traveling to the past is a desperate measure to introduce the virus to humans with more robust immune systems in the hope that the survivors will be better able to resist the virus when the alien species creates it.

== Lungfish ==
This story takes place aboard a multi-generational spaceship travelling from Earth to a planet orbiting Tau Ceti with the goal of establishing a colony. The story's action concerns the end of the journey. The trip has taken 37 years, and by now the crew is composed of two groups—the Earthborn, the surviving members of the original crew, and the Tripborn, descendants of the original crew, who have lived their entire lives aboard the ship.

On reaching the destination planet, the Tripborn refuse to leave the ship. Never having lived on a planet, they don't seem to see the appeal. Additionally the idea causes severe agoraphobia, as experienced by one Tripborn crew member who makes a landing on the planet and must be retrieved by remote control. The Earthborn crew members employ a variety of means to make the Tripborn less comfortable on the ship, such as Psychoactive Drug included in the food supply and subtle background sounds designed to cause unease. However this fails to move the Tripborn, even despite the fact that the ship will be unable to support the full crew's life for more than a few weeks more. The Tripborn also note that it's difficult to accept the Earthborn crew's rosy predictions for the future when the overall mission calls for the Earthborn to return home, leaving the Tripborn to establish the colony.

Since the ship's cargo includes the necessary tools to build a city suitable for 10,000 inhabitants on the destination planet, the Earthborn crew suggests that they instead be employed in the construction of a second spaceship. The reduced crew on the original ship could be supported by the ship's systems, and the Earthborn crew would no longer need the original ship for the return voyage.

The story ends before this plan has been carried out, leaving the reader to imagine whether the plan would be successful.

== No Other Gods But Me ==
As with the first story, this story takes place on the near-future Earth. Colin Hooper is a man who is completing recovery from a severe mental breakdown, which significantly included hallucination. After repeated chance meetings with Vanessa Sheriff he becomes unnerved by the fact that whenever she is present, the hallucinations return. However, she sees them as well. Their meetings are repeatedly interrupted by the appearance of a man calling himself Kolok, who makes dire predictions if they should keep meeting, but offers no details of what might occur.

Vanessa marries a man who is involved with an organisation calling itself Real Truth, which she describes as a cult. The "Real Truthers" beliefs include a belief in the supremacy of human thought as the primary force in the universe, and the idea that by working together they can think into existence someone who they describe as the Perfect Man.

After being drawn into a meeting of Real Truth, Colin and Vanessa accidentally cross over into a parallel-universe Earth in which mental powers such as psychokinesis are practised by a number of adepts, who use these powers to enslave the rest of the population. It is explained that these abilities originated thousands of years past as the result of a mutation which the adepts carry. The leader, Telthis, is the one with the strongest mental powers, and has been using his abilities to influence events on Colin and Vanessa's Earth with the purpose of eventually invading it and ruling both Earths. It was Telthis's efforts which caused Colin's breakdown and hallucinations. Telthis also manipulated Colin and Vanessa into their apparently random meetings, because they also carry the genetic mutation of the adepts on Telthis' Earth, and he hopes that by bringing them together they will eventually have children and promote psychokinetic and other mental powers. Kolok, it turns out, is Telthis' chief opponent, who has appeared to Colin and Vanessa in the hope of preventing this.

Colin and Vanessa manage with Kolok's help to escape from captivity and return to their own Earth. Shortly afterward, Telthis' invasion begins. However he discovers that his mental powers do not function outside of his own Earth. He and his soldiers are attacked by an angry mob and carried off by police.
