= Children of the Thunder =

1988 novel by John Brunner

- First edition
- Author: John Brunner
- Language: English
- Genre: Science fiction
- Publisher: Del Rey
- Publication date: 13 December 1988
- Publication place: Great Britain
- Pages: Print (Paperback)
- ISBN: 0-345-31378-X
- OCLC: 19096678
- LC Class: CPB Box no. 1744 vol. 17

Children of the Thunder is a 1988 science fiction novel by John Brunner.
