= Players at the Game of People =

1980 novel by John Brunner

First edition, cover art by Ron Logan

Players at the Game of People is a science fiction novel by John Brunner. It was first published in the United States by Nelson Doubleday in 1980.
