= The Book of the Thousand Nights and a Night =

Burton English language translation of One Thousand and One Nights

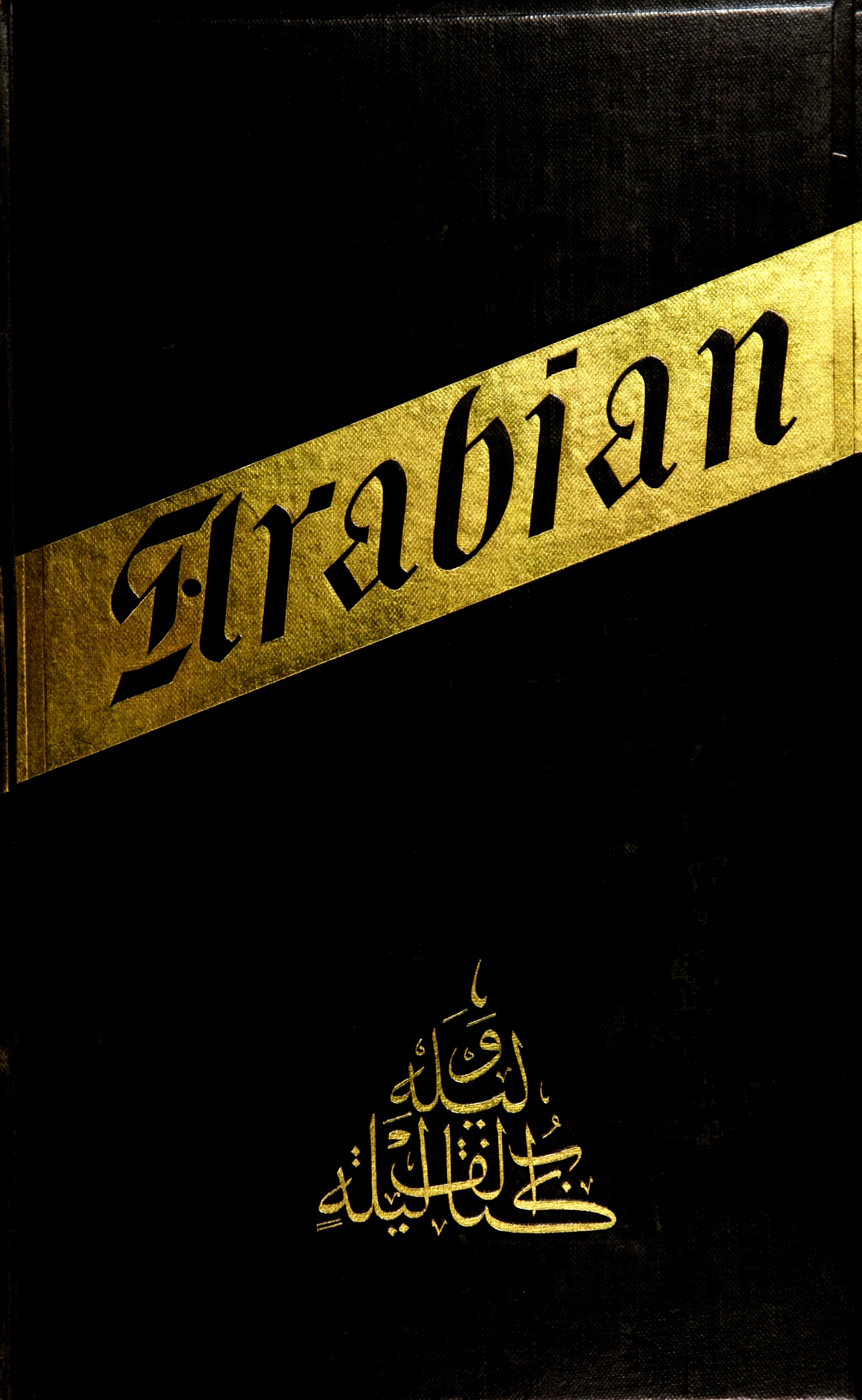
- Cover of a volume of the original Kama Shastra Society first edition.
- Translator: Richard Francis Burton
- Language: English
- Subject: Arab folktales and stories
- Genre: Arabic literature Fantasy fiction
- Publisher: Privately printed by the "Kama Shastra Society"
- Publication date: 1888
- Publication place: United Kingdom
- ISBN: 978-0517001523
- Followed by: The Supplemental Nights to the Thousand Nights and a Night (1886–1888)

The Book of the Thousand Nights and a Night (1888), subtitled A Plain and Literal Translation of the Arabian Nights Entertainments, is the only complete English language translation of One Thousand and One Nights (the Arabian Nights) to date – a collection of Middle Eastern and South Asian stories and folk tales compiled in Arabic during the Islamic Golden Age (8th−13th centuries) – by the British explorer and Arabist Richard Francis Burton (1821–1890). It stands as the only complete translation of the Macnaghten or Calcutta II edition (Egyptian recension) of the "Arabian Nights".

Burton's translation was one of two unabridged and unexpurgated English translations done in the 1880s; the first was by John Payne, under the title The Book of the Thousand Nights and One Night (1882–1884, nine volumes). Burton's ten volume version was published almost immediately afterward with a slightly different title. This, along with the fact that Burton closely advised Payne and partially based his books on Payne's, led later to charges of plagiarism. Owing to the sexual imagery in the source texts (which Burton made a special study of, adding extensive footnotes and appendices on Oriental sexual mores) and to the strict Victorian laws on obscene material, both translations were printed as private editions for subscribers only, rather than being published in the usual manner. Burton's original ten volumes were followed by a further seven entitled The Supplemental Nights to the Thousand Nights and a Night (1886–1888). Burton's 17 volumes, while boasting many prominent admirers, have been criticised for their "archaic language and extravagant idiom" and "obsessive focus on sexuality"; they have even been called an "eccentric ego-trip" and a "highly personal reworking of the text". His voluminous and obscurely detailed notes and appendices have been characterised as “obtrusive, kinky and highly personal”.

In 1982, the International Astronomical Union (IAU) began naming features on Saturn's moon Enceladus after characters and places in Burton's translation because “its surface is so strange and mysterious that it was given the Arabian Nights as a name bank, linking fantasy landscape with a literary fantasy”. (See List of geological features on Enceladus.)

== Background ==
Burton – an accomplished geographer, explorer, orientalist, ethnologist, diplomat, polylinguist and author – was best known in his lifetime for travelling in disguise to Mecca (1853) and for journeying (with John Hanning Speke) as the first European to visit the Great Lakes of Africa in search of the source of the Nile (1857–58). One of the great Arabists of his day, he had long wanted to publish an unexpurgated version of the Arabian Nights stories. The first translations into English, notably that by Edward Lane (1840, 1859), were highly abridged and heavily bowdlerised, which irritated Burton.

In 1863 Burton co-founded the Anthropological Society of London with Dr. James Hunt. In Burton's own words, the main aim of the society (through the publication of the periodical Anthropologia) was "to supply travelers with an organ that would rescue their observations from the outer darkness of manuscript and print their curious information on social and sexual matters". Burton had written numerous travel books which invariably included sexual curiosa in extensive footnotes and appendices. His best-known contributions to literature were those considered risqué or even pornographic at the time and which were published under the auspices of the "Kama Shastra Society", a fictitious organisation created by Burton and Forster Fitzgerald Arbuthnot as a legal device to avoid the consequences of current obscenity laws. (Burton and Arbuthnot were the only members of the "Society".) These works included The Kama Sutra of Vatsyayana (1883), published just before his Nights, and The Perfumed Garden of the Shaykh Nefzawi (1886), published just after it.

== Publication history ==
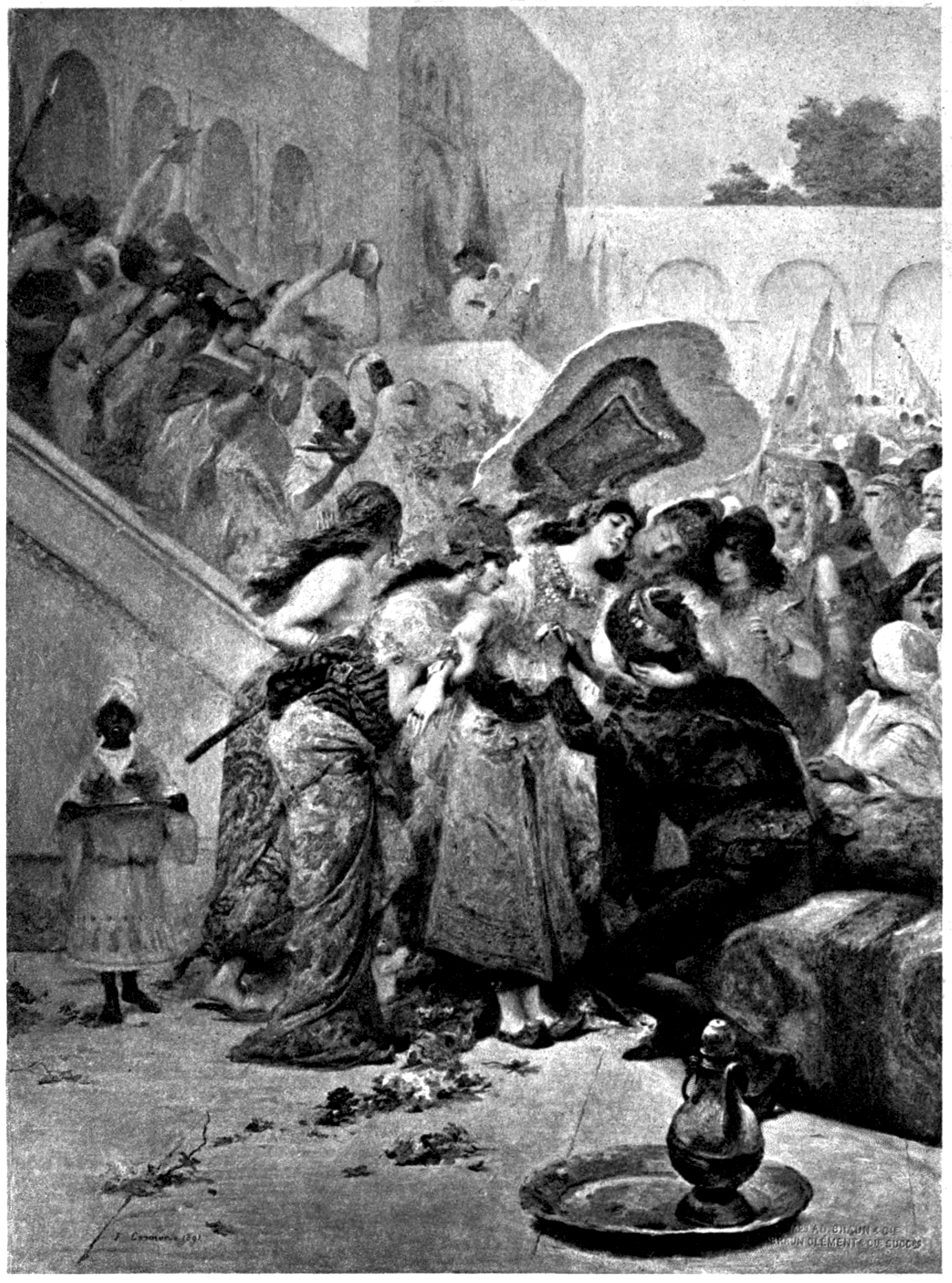
The frontispiece to Volume I of Burton's Nights (Adolphe Lalauze (1838–1905), French illustrator)

The volumes were printed by the Kama Shastra Society in a subscribers-only edition of one thousand with a guarantee that there would never be a larger printing of the books in this form. To confound possible litigation, the title pages claimed the printing had been done in "Benares", but this was a subterfuge. In reality, it was done by Miller & Richard (a Scottish firm) at Stoke Newington.

== Contents ==
=== Sexology ===
The stories collected in the Nights are often sexual in content and were considered pornography at the time of Burton's publication. The Terminal Essay in volume 10 of Burton's Nights contains a 14,000-word section entitled "Pederasty" (Volume 10, section IV, D). Here Burton postulated that male homosexuality was prevalent in an area of the southern latitudes named by him the "Sotadic zone".

== Plagiarism controversy ==
John Payne and Burton collaborated on their respective translations of the Nights for more than half a decade, and each respected the other's scholarship, but Payne believed that Burton had plagiarised his manuscripts when he sent them to Trieste to be checked. In 1906, a biographer of Burton, Thomas Wright, made the claim that Burton had plagiarised most of his translation from Payne. Burton's most recent biographer (1998) summarises the situation as follows.

He [Wright] made a comparison of the respective versions of the Nights by Burton and Payne. We know, not only from Richard's and Isabel's writings but from the statements of people who met him through the years, that Burton had been collecting manuscripts of the Nights stories and translating them, on and off, for over twenty-five years before he met Payne. So Wright's claim that Burton had not done his own translation, but had "taken from Payne at least three-quarters of his entire work", is extraordinary.

Norman Mosley Penzer, in his 1923 Annotated Bibliography of Burton's works, takes great umbrage at "Wright's futile efforts to glorify Payne and scoff at Burton", contradicting several of his examples point by point. In Burton's defence, Penzer asserts that it is usual for translators to study and follow in the footsteps of earlier translators and cites examples of similarities in the stories Payne translated after Burton had published his version.

The "plagiarism" allegation is also examined in detail in an appendix to Fawn Brodie's 1967 biography of Burton, The Devil Drives.

== Style ==
In translating the Nights, Burton attempted to invent an English equivalent of medieval Arabic. In doing so, he drew upon Chaucerian English, Elizabethan English, and the 1653 English translation by Sir Thomas Urquhart of the first three books of Rabelais's Gargantua and Pantagruel (1532-1546).

According to British historian and Arabist Robert Irwin:

Burton shared [John] Payne's enthusiasm for archaic and forgotten words. The style Burton achieved can be described as a sort of composite mock-Gothic, combining elements from Middle English, the Authorized Version of the Bible and Jacobean drama. Most modern readers will also find Burton's Victorian vulgarisms jarring, for example ‘regular Joe Millers’, ‘Charleys’, and ‘red cent’. Burton's translation of the Nights can certainly be recommended to anyone wishing to increase their word-power: ‘chevisance’, ‘fortalice’, ‘kemperly’, ‘cark’, ‘foison’, ‘soothfast’, ‘perlection’, ‘wittol’, ‘parergon’, ‘brewis’, ‘bles’, ‘fadaise’, ‘coelebs’, ‘vivisepulture’, and so on. ‘Whilome’ and ‘anent’ are standard in Burton's vocabulary. The range of vocabulary is wider and stranger than Payne's, lurching between the erudite and the plain earthy, so that Harun al-Rashid and Sinbad walk and talk in a linguistic Never Never Land.

== Reception ==
Many early commentators on Burton's Nights criticised his eccentric "mixture of obsolete words, mediaeval phrases, modern slang, Americanisms, and foreign words and expressions". Jorge Luis Borges, however, wrote a celebrated essay on "The Translators of The Thousand and One Nights" in which – while he chastises Burton for his distortions and "indulgent loitering" — he allows that "the problems that Burton resolved are innumerable" and delights in his careful use of an extravagantly exotic vocabulary in which each word "is indubitably the mot juste." In summarising his use of language, Borges concluded that "In some way, the almost inexhaustible process of English is adumbrated in Burton – John Donne's hard obscenity, the gigantic vocabularies of Shakespeare and Cyril Tourneur, Swinburne's affinity for the archaic, the crass erudition of the authors of 17th century chapbooks, the energy and imprecision, the love of tempests and magic."

== Editions ==
=== Original publication ===
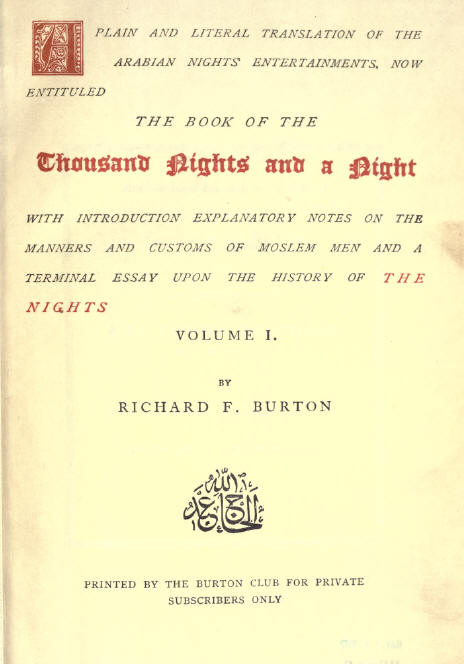
Title page from one of the many editions published in the United States under the name of the imaginary "Burton Club".

- A Plain and Literal Translation of the Arabian Nights' Entertainments, Now Entituled [sic] The Book of The Thousand Nights and a Night; With Introduction Explanatory Notes on the Manners and Customs of Moslem Men and a Terminal Essay upon the History of the Nights by Richard F. Burton; Benares: MDCCCLXXXV: Printed by the Kamashastra Society for Private Subscribers Only.
  - First series of 1885 in ten volumes. With illustrations.
  - Supplemental series of 1886–1888 in six volumes. With illustrations. The large third volume was often split in later editions, making it a seven-volume series.

Volumes

- The Book of the Thousand Nights and a Night (1 of 10) Project Gutenberg
- The Book of the Thousand Nights and a Night (2 of 10) Project Gutenberg
- The Book of the Thousand Nights and a Night (3 of 10) Project Gutenberg
- The Book of the Thousand Nights and a Night (4 of 10) Project Gutenberg
- The Book of the Thousand Nights and a Night (5 of 10) Project Gutenberg
- The Book of the Thousand Nights and a Night (6 of 10) Project Gutenberg
- The Book of the Thousand Nights and a Night (7 of 10) Project Gutenberg
- The Book of the Thousand Nights and a Night (8 of 10) Project Gutenberg
- The Book of the Thousand Nights and a Night (9 of 10) Project Gutenberg
- The Book of the Thousand Nights and a Night (10 of 10) Project Gutenberg
- Supplemental Nights to the Book of the Thousand and One Nights (1 of 6) Project Gutenberg
- Supplemental Nights to the Book of the Thousand and One Nights (2 of 6) Project Gutenberg
- Supplemental Nights to the Book of the Thousand and One Nights (3 of 6) Project Gutenberg
- Supplemental Nights to the Book of the Thousand and One Nights (4 of 6) Project Gutenberg
- Supplemental Nights to the Book of the Thousand and One Nights (5 of 6) Project Gutenberg
- Supplemental Nights to the Book of the Thousand and One Nights (6 of 6) Project Gutenberg

=== Lady Burton's edition ===
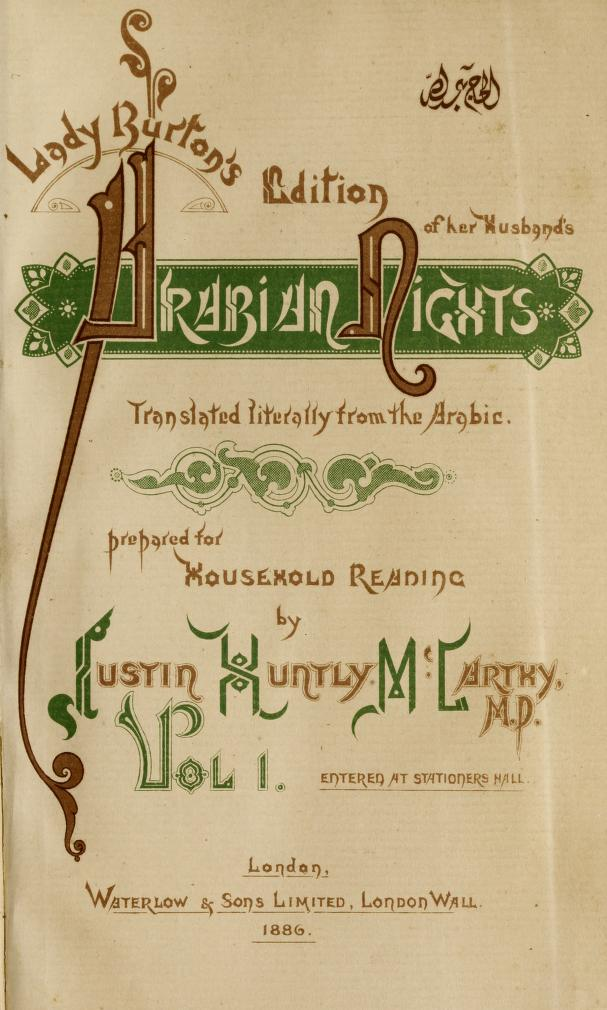
Title page of Volume I of Lady Burton's Edition of Her Husband's Arabian Nights.

- Lady Burton's Edition of Her Husband's Arabian Nights Translated Literally from the Arabic (1886-1887); Prepared for Household Reading by Justin Huntly McCarthy, M.P.; 6 vols.; London: Waterlow & Sons, Limited, London Wall.

This edition is ostensibly the “family” version of Burton's translation. (In her "Preface", Lady Burton guarantees that "no mother shall regret her girl's reading this Arabian Nights".) It is a much bowdlerized version of the original edition and was not a commercial success. It excises 215 of the original 3,215 pages, including Burton's defense of turpiloquium in his "Foreword", all sexually explicit commentary, and the two final essays on "Pornography" and "Pederasty." Lady Burton merely lent her name to this expurgated edition. As she stated before his death, "I have never read, nor do I intend to read, at his own request, and to be true to my promise to him, my husband's Arabian Nights."

=== Nichols-Smithers editions ===
- 1894 H.S. Nichols & Co, London, edition by Leonard C. Smithers, 12 Volumes. This edition "omits given passages in dreadful taste, whose elimination will be mourned by no one".
- 1897 H.S. Nichols & Co, London, "Illustrated Library Edition", 12 Volumes. With 142 original illustrations, including a portrait of Burton, reproduced from the original pictures in oils specially painted by Albert Letchford with one set of the original 71 illustrations presented as included by the publisher and another set individually hand-coloured.

Text. Nichols' scarce and handsome second edition is lightly expurgated, with the same cuts as the 1894 edition, but far fewer than in Lady Burton's Edition.
Illustrations. This is the first edition to include the illustrations by Letchford. In 1896, two years after their first edition of Burton's Nights, the Nichols-Smithers duo commissioned Burton's close friend, Albert Letchford, to paint 65 illustrations for another edition as well as a portrait of Burton, and soon after commissioned for five more. Burton and Letchford had met several years before when the latter was 18 and in Florence beginning his art education. They discussed the possibility of illustrating the Nights. Burton's suggestion of illustrating the Nights had appealed greatly to Letchford on account of the unlimited scope such a subject would give to an artist who loved the East and had a boundless imagination. Letchford commenced study of Eastern images for his paintings, though only one of the illustrations was painted in Burton's lifetime.

=== American editions ===
“Burton Society of Denver” edition

- Alf Laylah Wa Laylah, The Book of the Thousand Nights and a Night, by Richard F. Burton. Press of the Carson-Harper Company, Denver, Colo., 1900–01. “For private subscribers only.” Includes 100 illustrations by Stanley L. Wood. This was a facsimile of the original unexpurgated edition with additional illustrations, and the best reprint for many decades. This edition is the one used by the IAU for naming features on Enceladus. Only the last three volumes (4, 5, and 6 of the Supplemental Nights) are dated 1901. The edition was a commercial failure.

“Burton Club” (and “Burton Ethnological Society”) editions

The electros from the "Burton Society of Denver" edition were acquired by the "Burton Club" — “the nom de plume of a certain Boston publisher”, according to N.C. Penzer. This very successful series of editions probably began in 1903 (none of the volumes bear dates) and continued for many decades. At least one edition identical to the "Burton Club" series appeared under the imprint of the "Burton Ethnological Society". There are 114 illustrations by at least thirteen different English and French artists. Many of these are uncredited and many are from other editions of the Nights, including pre-Burton editions. Some have nothing to do with the Nights or even the Middle East. All of Letchford's works from the Nichols-Smithers edition are there, except the portrait of Burton. Penzer's bibliography lists nine different Burton Club editions. After about 1905 each was named after a city (Benares, Mecca, Medinah, Aden, Baghdad, Samara, Bassorah, Shammar, and Luristan), a new one appearing about every two years. Penzer called these the "Catch Word" editions and there are known to be at least six others (Teheran, Baroda, Bombay, etc.). These editions were made semi-surreptitiously up through the 1920s and many may have been printed in the US, but bound in the UK. There exists no definitive list of all "Burton Club" editions or their sequence. According to Penzer, the "Illustrated Benares" edition was the first.

Volumes

- The Book of the Thousand Nights and a Night, 1 (of 10) Project Gutenberg
- The Book of the Thousand Nights and a Night, 2 (of 10) Project Gutenberg
- The Book of the Thousand Nights and a Night, 3 (of 10) Project Gutenberg
- The Book of the Thousand Nights and a Night, 4 (of 10) Project Gutenberg
- The Book of the Thousand Nights and a Night, 5 (of 10) Project Gutenberg
- The Book of the Thousand Nights and a Night, 6 (of 10) Project Gutenberg
- The Book of the Thousand Nights and a Night, 7 (of 10) Project Gutenberg
- The Book of the Thousand Nights and a Night, 8 (of 10) Project Gutenberg
- The Book of the Thousand Nights and a Night, 9 (of 10) Project Gutenberg
- The Book of the Thousand Nights and a Night, 10 (of 10) Project Gutenberg
- Supplemental Nights to the Book of the Thousand and One Nights 1 (of 6) Project Gutenberg
- Supplemental Nights to the Book of the Thousand and One Nights 2 (of 6) Project Gutenberg
- Supplemental Nights to the Book of the Thousand and One Nights 3 (of 6) Part 1 Project Gutenberg
- Supplemental Nights to the Book of the Thousand and One Nights 3 (of 6) Part 2 Project Gutenberg
- Supplemental Nights to the Book of the Thousand and One Nights 4 (of 6) Project Gutenberg
- Supplemental Nights to the Book of the Thousand and One Nights 5 (of 6) Project Gutenberg
- Supplemental Nights to the Book of the Thousand and One Nights 6 (of 6) Project Gutenberg

=== Later reprint editions ===
- In 1932, a Modern Library version edited by Bennett Cerf reprinted selected portions of Smithers' bowdlerised version (claiming it to be an "unabridged" and "unexpurgated" edition). "Illustrations and decorations" by Steele Savage. Versions of this reprint with and without Savage's artwork have had a long and varied life:
  - The ’'Arabian Nights’' Entertainments, Or The Book of a Thousand Nights and a Night: A Selection of the Most Famous and Representative of These Tales from the Plain and Literal Translations by Richard F. Burton (1932), Modern Library #201; "The Stories Have Been Chosen and Arranged by Bennett A. Cerf and are Printed Complete and Unabridged with Many of Burton's Notes"; Introductory Essay by Ben Ray Redman.
  - Selections From The Arabian Nights, Sir Richard Burton's famous translation of The Thousand Nights and a Night, with modernised... (1938), With new illustrations and decorations by Steele Savage; Garden City, NY: De Luxe Editions Club, 400 pages.
  - The Arabian Nights: Unexpurgated Edition, A Complete and Unabridged Selection from the Literal Translation of...Burton; Blue Ribbon Books (1941).
  - Unexpurgated Selections from The Arabian Nights; Sir Richard Burton's Famous Translation ...; Halcyon House (1948); Illustrations and decorations by Steele Savage
  - Selections from the Arabian Nights Sir Richard Burton's Translation (1992); Univ Pub House; 390 pages
  - The Arabian Nights, Tales from a Thousand and One Nights (2001), Translated, with a Preface and Notes, by Sir Richard F. Burton; Introduction by A.S. Byatt; New York: The Modern Library; 872 pp. (Paperback only; no illustrations; includes commentary by Burton, Lady Burton, John Addington Symonds, Algernon Charles Swinburne, and an anonymous reviewer for The Nation.) A 2004 reprint had 1049 pp.
  - The Arabian Nights, Barnes & Noble (2009); 744 pages.
  - Other reprints of the Cerf/Savage edition by The Book League of America, Communication & Studies Inc. Georgia, etc.
- 1934 Limited Editions Club edition: The Book of the Thousand Nights and a Night: The Complete Burton Translation with the Complete Burton Notes, the Terminal Index, and 1001 Decorations by Valenti Angelo, 6 Volumes in slipcase (reprinted in 3 double-sized volumes by The Heritage Press, 1962)
- 1962: Arabian Miniatures: The Most Beautiful Nights, Astra-Club; 12 mounted color plates (reprinted in France by Editions Du Sud, 1968)
- 1954: Arabian Nights Entertainments, 4 Volumes in 2 slipcases; 65 stories; 60 illustrations by Arthur Szyk; England: Limited Editions Club; Limited to 1,500 copies edition
- 1991 A Signet Classic edition: Zipes, Jack, Arabian Nights, the Marvels and Wonders of the Thousand and One Nights, Adapted from Richard F. Burton's Unexpurgated Translation, Penguin Books; paperback, 595 pages.
- 1994 The Easton Press edition (Norwalk, Conn): The Book of the Thousand Nights and a Night: With Introduction Explanatory Notes on the Manners and Customs of Moslem Men and a Terminal Essay Upon The History of the Nights; 17 Volumes (Morocco leather binding, with elaborate gilt gold and silver tooling on the spine and on the front and back covers; Moiré silk used for the front and end pieces and satin for the sewn-in place-marker.)
- 1996 Maxfield Parrish artists edition The Easton Press Collectors Art edition (Norwalk, Conn): The Book of the Thousand Nights and a Night Best Known Tales : Original text and artwork reissue of Wiggin, K. D. - The Arabian Nights, Scribner & Sons, 1909 edition (Leather bound, gold inlaid spine on front and back covers; Moiré silk front and end pieces and satin for the sewn-in place-marker.) Single Volume collecting 10 tales and 12 illustrations 344 pages.
