= Albert Letchford =

English artist (1866–1905)

Albert Letchford (1866–1905) was an English artist who lived in Italy, best known for his portraits of Sir Richard Francis Burton and his illustrations for the 1897 edition of The Book of the Thousand Nights and a Night.

== Life ==
Albert Letchford was born in Trieste in 1866, the son of Thomas and Eliza Letchford. He completed his artistic training in Venice and Paris, and travelled to Egypt where he made a living from small commissions.

He met Sir Richard Francis Burton at the house of the English novelist Ouida (Maria Louise Ramé) in Florence, though both were living in Trieste at the time. Burton had been British Consul there since 1872.

Burton's wife Isabel commissioned Letchford to paint four views from the windows of Villa Gossleth (now Villa Economo), their residence in Trieste, and nine of their favourite interiors, including one of Burton studying in his bedroom. Letchford became the Burtons' "Court Painter", frequently working in their house, and painted a life-size portrait of Burton fencing. These paintings now form part of the Burton Collection, housed in Orleans House Gallery, London.

On Burton's death on 20 October 1890, his widow commissioned Letchford to make plaster casts of Burton's head, hand and foot. He and his sister Daisy had become trusted acquaintances of Isabel who, fearing for her sanity, signed a power of attorney to her doctor and to Letchford, and appointed them as her executors.

After Isabel Burton's departure from Trieste for England, Letchford and his family moved to Naples, where he produced seventy-two illustrations for the 12-volume Library Edition of The Book of the Thousand Nights and a Night published by H.S.Nichols & Co, London in 1897.

He died in Naples on 24 July 1905 and was buried there in the English Cemetery, together with other members of his family.
