= Not Before Time =

- Cover of the first edition
- Author: John Brunner
- Cover artist: Don Punchatz
- Language: English
- Genre: Science fiction
- Publisher: Four Square Books
- Publication date: 1968
- Publication place: United States
- Media type: Print (paperback)
- Pages: 128 pp
- ISBN: 0-450-02391-5 (paperback reprint)
- OCLC: 16288676

Not Before Time (ISBN 0-450-02391-5) is a collection of science fiction short stories by John Brunner, published in 1968.

== Contents ==
- Prerogative
- Fair Warning
- The Warp and the Woof-Woof
- Singleminded
- A Better Mousetrap
- Coincidence Day
- Seizure
- Treason is a Two-Edged Sword
- Eye of the Beholder
- Round Trip
