= Echo in the Skull =

1959 novel by John Brunner

- First edition
- Author: John Brunner
- Cover artist: Robert E. Schulz
- Language: English
- Genre: Science-fiction novel
- Published: 1959 (Ace Books)
- Publication place: United States of America
- Media type: Print (paperback)
- Pages: 94 (paperback edition)
- OCLC: 7370008

Echo in the Skull is a science-fiction novel by British novelist John Brunner, first published in the United States by Ace Books as part of Ace Double #D-385. In 1974 Brunner had an expanded version of the story published as Give Warning to the World.

== The underlying premise ==
Brunner assumes the existence of a universe-spanning field capable of mimicking sentient thought. When a female dies violently, this field records her last moments of life and makes them available to certain other sentient females in the form of lucid dreams. The information spreads across the field instantaneously, in a manner reminiscent of quantum entanglement. The dreams comprise the echo in the skull of the title.

== Plot summary ==
Echo in the Skull, 1959:

Sometime in the late 1950s, Sally Ercott awakens from a drunken stupor in a filthy room in a sleazy boarding house on Mamble Row in the Paddington section of London. She is destitute and suffering from amnesia and the proprietors of the house, Arthur and Bella Rowall, eagerly await the day when she agrees to work for them as a prostitute. She goes outside and is overwhelmed by one of the waking nightmares that have driven her down. In her inattention, she is nearly hit by a car.

The driver of the car, Nick Jenkins, notices her plight and insists on taking her to lunch. Then he takes her to his apartment, where she can bathe while he goes out and buys her new clothes. When he returns, Nick calls a doctor, his friend Tom Gospell, and asks him to come and examine Sally. As they wait for Dr. Gospell, Sally and Nick discuss her nightmares and infer that they seem like actual memories of girls and women dying on alien worlds.

After Dr. Gospell examines Sally and finds nothing wrong with her, Nick goes out to do more shopping. He is kidnapped by Arthur Rowall and taken to the boarding house, where Bella guards him as Arthur goes to kidnap Sally. Clyde West, another resident of the boarding house, helps Nick escape and tie Bella up. With his penknife Nick cuts Bella's dress and exposes a greenish parasite spread across her back. Leaving Bella bound to a chair, the men hurry to Nick's apartment to prevent Arthur from kidnapping Sally. They are too late, but Dr. Gospell calls and Nick tells him to meet Clyde and him at the boarding house.

At the boarding house Nick and Clyde see that Mrs. Ramsey, another tenant, has freed Bella and that a policeman is taking Bella's complaint. Bella points to Nick and Clyde as the men who attacked her, but before the policeman can react Dr. Gospell arrives and takes command of the situation, declaring that Bella is delusional and that he will treat her. After Dr. Gospell has injected novocaine into the parasite, Nick gets him and Clyde to help him break into the sitting room.

Inside, they find Sally, in a kind of stupor, lying naked on the couch with Arthur kneeling on the floor next to her. The parasite on Arthur's back has extended a pseudopod toward Sally's back. Nick charges into the room and knocks Arthur over, then brings Sally out of her stupor and helps her dress. Sally leads the men to the basement, where they see a much larger version of the parasite. At that moment Inspector Dougherty arrives and demands an explanation.

When they return to the sitting room they see that Arthur's parasite has pulled out of his body and is forming into a sphere, leaving Arthur dead. Warned by Sally, Dougherty wraps the sphere in his coat, takes it outside, and puts into a trash can just before it explodes. Shaken, he returns to the sitting room and Sally explains.

Relying on her acquired memories, the waking nightmares that had plagued her, Sally tells the men that the creatures, called the Yem, are sentient parasites that have learned to propel their spores into space, where they ride the radiation winds of the stars to spread their kind across the galaxy in an act of panspermia. Now that Scotland Yard has been alerted to the danger all of humanity can be warned and the Yem attempt to take over Earth can be thwarted.

Give Warning to the World, 1974:

The plot of Give Warning to the World differs from that of Echo in the Skull in:

1. Arthur Rowall becomes Alfred Rowall, and Bella Rowall, in addition to the squalid boarding house on Mamble Row, has an apartment in Soho where she plies her trade as a prostitute specializing in sadomasochism.
2. The police have the Rowalls under surveillance on a suspicion of something, they know not what, having to do with missing people. In Echo in the Skull the police did not get involved until the very end.
3. Brunner introduces a new character, Richard Argyle, an incompetent and corrupt doctor who has one of the parasites on his back. He works for Bella Rowall and keeps Sally drugged. Sally is more explicitly kept imprisoned in the boarding house.
4. Clyde West, now a Jamaican rather than an Australian, helps Sally escape from the boarding house instead of helping Nick escape from Bella when she is about to shoot him.
5. Instead of Arthur Rowall kidnapping Nick and then going back to Nick's place to kidnap Sally, Alfred Rowall and two accomplices kidnap Sally when she and Nick return to his apartment from having dinner. The thugs fail to kidnap Nick because Clyde intervenes, thereby setting up the final act when Nick, Clyde, and Tom Gospell raid the boarding house.
6. The explosion of the frustrated Yem destroys the entire boarding house and not just a trash can.

== Publication history ==
- 1959, United Kingdom, Nova Publications (Science Fantasy), Vol 12 #36, Pub date Aug 1959, digest magazine (114 pp).
- 1959, US, Ace Books (Ace Double #D-385), paperback (94 pp).

== Reviews ==
The book was reviewed by

- Frederik Pohl at If (Mar 1960).
- P. Schuyler Miller at Astounding/Analog Science Fact & Fiction (Jun 1960).
- Lynn Holdom at Science Fiction Review (Feb 1975).
- Uwe Anton (in Germany) at Science Fiction Times (Oct 1983).

== Listings ==
The book is listed at

- The Library of Congress as http://lccn.loc.gov/97821524
