= Double, Double (Brunner novel) =

1969 novel by John Brunner

- First edition cover
- Author: John Brunner
- Language: English
- Genre: Science fiction
- Publisher: Ballantine Books
- Publication date: 1969
- Publication place: United States
- Media type: Print (paperback)
- Pages: 222
- OCLC: 8427314

Double, Double is a science fiction novel by John Brunner, first published in the United States as an original paperback by Ballantine Books in 1969 and reprinted in 1979 as a Del Rey paperback. A hardcover edition was released in the British market in 1971 by Sidgwick & Jackson.

== Summary ==
Bruno and his band The Hermetic Tradition visit the North Kent coast where they plan to hold an open-air cliff-top concert. Events take an unusual turn when the band meet a fish capable of eating and doubling the things it finds.

== Reception ==
Spider Robinson dismissed the novel, saying "there just ain't all that much right with it. . . . It's a shame writers have to do this stuff to stay alive."
