= The World Swappers =

1959 novel by John Brunner

- Cover of the first edition
- Author: John Brunner
- Language: English
- Genre: Science fiction
- Publisher: Ace Books
- Publication date: 1959
- Publication place: United States
- Media type: Print (Paperback)
- Pages: 153

The World Swappers is a science fiction novel by British writer John Brunner. It was first published in the United States in 1959, as one half of Ace Double D-391. The other half was Siege of the Unseen by A. E. van Vogt. Reprinted by Ace 1967, 1976.

== Plot ==
In the middle of the Third Millennium the Earth is peaceful and prosperous, but discontent is growing in the small sphere of Human-colonised worlds. Earth business tycoon Bassett hopes to profit from this trouble, but he is opposed by Counce, an agent of a secret elite attempting to guide history for the benefit of Humanity. This organisation, backed by Ram and Falconetta of the influential Video India broadcasting network, has sole access to the transfax, a matter transmitter technology that allows instant transportation and duplication of objects and living beings. Counce and his agents are effectively immortal because they can be recreated from transfax recordings in the event of their deaths.

The situation is complicated by the arrival of the Others, aliens hoping to colonise some of the worlds in Human Space, who threaten Ymir, a frigid planet sparsely populated by religious fanatics hostile to Earth. Falconetta's protege Anty suggests that the Others' survey ship be pulled from space and landed by transfax to prevent knowledge of Ymir reaching the Others' home world.

The plan goes awry, and there is a battle which kills Anty and most of the Others. Meanwhile, Bassett kidnaps the Ymirian girl Enni and interrogates her, and on the basis of the knowledge gained from her he agrees to a truce with Counce. Ymir is evacuated by Bassett, and its population is sent to more hospitable Human colony worlds to everyone's satisfaction, including Bassett, who has gained profit and prestige from the enterprise. The Others are given Ymir to colonise in exchange for peace.

But Bassett is not comfortable sharing his power with a secret society, and moves against their agents at Video India. Counce, three hundred years old and in his fifth reincarnation, is feeling tired of a life of struggle, and decides to make a suicide attack on Bassett's ship. Having left orders that he should not be recreated, he is surprised to find that he doesn't die. As he regains consciousness, he is greeted by Enni and Anty.

== Sources ==
- Tuck, Donald H. (1974). The Encyclopedia of Science Fiction and Fantasy. Chicago: Advent. p. 72. ISBN 0-911682-20-1.
