= Secret Agent of Terra =

1962 novel by John Brunner

- Cover of the first edition
- Author: John Brunner
- Cover artist: Ed Emshwiller
- Language: English
- Series: Zarathustra Refugee Planets
- Genre: Science fiction
- Publisher: Ace Books
- Publication date: 1962
- Publication place: United States
- Media type: Print (paperback)
- Pages: 127 pp
- Followed by: Castaways' World

Secret Agent of Terra is a 1962 science fiction novel by British writer John Brunner. It is the first book of the Zarathustra Refugee Planets series; the other books are Castaways' World (1963) and The Repairmen of Cyclops (1965). Secret Agent of Terra was first published as Ace Double F-133, with The Rim of Space by A. Bertram Chandler.

Brunner later reworked the story for his 1969 novel The Avengers of Carrig.

== Bibliography ==
- Secret Agent of Terra. New York: Ace Books. 1962.
- The Avengers of Carrig. New York: Daw Books. 1980 [1969]. ISBN 0-87997-509-1.
