= The Super Barbarians =

1962 novel by John Brunner

- Cover of the first edition
- Author: John Brunner
- Language: English
- Genre: Science fiction
- Publisher: 1962 Ace Books
- Publication place: United States
- Media type: Print (Paperback)
- Pages: 160
- Ace catalog number: D-547

The Super Barbarians is a science fiction novel by British writer John Brunner, first published in the United States by Ace Books in 1962. Written in the first person, the story gives an account of an Earthman's struggle to regain lost memories and to uncover the horrifying secret of the feudal society whose people used remarkably advanced technology to conquer Earth and its solar system.

== Plot summary ==
For two generations humanity has been enslaved by the Vorra, a race of technologically advanced barbarians who had conquered space. On Qallavarra, the home planet of the Vorra, Gareth Shaw is an indentured servant of the House of Pwill, one of the giant city-states into which the planet is divided. As the only Terran on the estate, he is drawn into a seraglio intrigue by Under-lady Shavarri, the ninth wife of Pwill Himself, the overlord who rules the estate like a medieval duke. Shavarri's demand obliges Shaw to visit the "Acre of Earth", a ghetto-like enclave in the middle of a nearby city.

In the Acre humans lived in relative freedom because they provided services that the Vorra could not provide for themselves. Chief among those services was the maintenance and repair of machines brought from Earth for the Vorra to use. But the Terrans also provided certain chemical services and Shaw had been sent to obtain one of those.

Chased into the Acre by a Vorrish mob instigated by a squad of soldier-trainees, Shaw meets an almost equally hostile reception from three Terrans—Marijane Lee, her brother Ken, and their friend Gustav—who have rescued him from the mob. Seeing that he's wearing the livery of a Vorrish estate, they take him to Judge Olafsson, the voice of Terran law in the Acre. After being interrogated about his time on Qallavarra, Shaw leaves Judge Olafsson's court and completes his mission. He obtains from Hans Kramer, an apothecary, the love potion that Shavarri has ordered him to bring to her. Containing credulin, a drug that enhances suggestibility, the potion will enable Shavarri to manipulate Pwill Himself in her favor.

Returning to the Pwill estate, he is called to the Grand Terrace of the manor house, where he finds Pwill Himself and his primary wife, Over-lady Llaq, having an angry confrontation with their wastrel son, Pwill Heir Apparent. Pwill, Sr. tells Shaw that his son has become addicted to a drug that affects the Vorra much as heroin affects Terrans—coffee—and that he expects Shaw to ensure that no one in the Acre will supply his son with more coffee. Later Pwill, Jr. prevails upon Shaw to keep him supplied with coffee beans through his friend Forrel.

Soon after returning from the Acre and after his confrontation with Pwill Himself, Shaw begins to notice that he doesn't know things that he should know and that he knows things that, apparently, he shouldn't. He struggles to decode the meaning of that discovery and to regain lost memories, but has little success. After an encounter with the estate's whipmaster, he uses drugs obtained from Kramer to drive the whipmaster insane and thereby gains a reputation among the superstitious Vorra as a powerful shaman. One day he is taken to confront a rival shaman, who tells him that the Vorra acquired their hyperdrive-propelled starships and advanced weaponry by stealing them from another alien race. The shock of seeing the mummified remains of one of those aliens, still encased in a spacesuit, breaks a barrier in Shaw's mind and he begins to regain his lost memories, including why and how he lost his memories in the first place.

On the same day that he regains his memories he is told by Marijane to cut off Pwill, Jr's coffee supply. Shaw agrees, knowing that Heir Apparent's display of withdrawal symptoms will throw the House of Pwill into crisis and put his life into jeopardy. But before anyone can notice his withdrawal symptoms, Pwill, Jr. comes to Shaw's room desperately seeking coffee and attacks Shaw. In self-defense Shaw kills the young man and hides the body in a sewer. Heir Apparent's disappearance precipitates the desired crisis and Shaw comes under suspicion of having provided the coffee that kept the young man addicted. The night before he is to be tortured to death, Shaw is extracted from the Pwill estate by Marijane, Ken, and Gustav and taken to the Acre.

The next morning, convinced that his son has gone to the Acre in search of coffee, Pwill Himself leads four companies of his army toward the city, only to be ambushed by six companies of soldiers from the rival House of Shugurra. Soon thereafter the armies of ten other Houses join the battle and the Vorra are fully engaged in an all-out civil war, just as the Terrans had hoped.

In the Acre all of the Terrans on Qallavarra climb to the rooftops and watch as a Vorra starship descends upon the city. The ship has been hijacked by a specially developed robot that had been hidden in a cargo container and now the ship will take all of the Terrans back to Earth. There the ship's technology can be copied for use against the Vorra in the general Terran revolt.

Safe aboard the ship, Shaw sees the last piece of the puzzle fall into place in his mind. He realizes that the old shaman had lied to him about how the Vorra got their starships and advanced weaponry and he understands then that for the next century or so the Vorra will be the lesser of Earth's worries.

== Reception ==
Floyd C. Gale of Galaxy Science Fiction rated The Super Barbarians three stars out of five.
