= The Martian Sphinx =

1965 novel by John Brunner

- Cover of the first edition
- Author: John Brunner writing as Keith Woodcott
- Language: English
- Genre: Science fiction novel
- Publisher: Ace Books
- Publication date: 1965
- Publication place: United States
- Media type: Print (Paperback)
- Pages: 149 pp

The Martian Sphinx is a science fiction novel by John Brunner, writing under the pen-name of Keith Woodcott. It was first published in the United States by Ace Books in 1965.
