= Polymath (novel) =

1974 novel by John Brunner

- First edition Cover art by Vincent Di Fate
- Author: John Brunner
- Language: English
- Publication date: 1974

Polymath is a science fiction novel by John Brunner, first published in 1974 by DAW Books, an expansion of Castaways' World (Ace 1963). It is the book 2 of 3 of the "Zarathustra Refugee Planets" series.

== Plot summary ==
A spacecraft filled with refugees from a cosmic catastrophe crash-lands on an unmapped planet. There the survivors must face the reality of their precarious situation; the ship was lost and little had been salvaged from it. Everything comes to depend on one bright young man accidentally among them, a trainee planet-builder ("polymath"). While it would have been his job to oversee all aspects of establishing a successful colony he faces major difficulties; not only is his education incomplete, he had been studying a vastly different planet.

Two ships escaped the catastrophe. One lands in the jungle in a mountainous area. The other, with the polymath, lands on water, allowing the passengers just enough time to escape the sinking ship. With his education incomplete, he is faced with an array of problems he needs to overcome, in order to ensure the survival, of not only the passengers from his ship, but those on the lost ship as well, who are under the control of a despotic captain determined to get back into space.
