= The Productions of Time =

1967 novel by John Brunner

- First edition
- Author: John Brunner
- Language: English
- Genre: Science fiction
- Publisher: Signet Books
- Publication date: 1967
- Media type: Print (book)
- Pages: 139
- OCLC: 2011327

The Productions of Time is a science fiction novel by English writer John Brunner, first published in The Magazine of Fantasy and Science Fiction in 1966. It appeared in book form the following year, published by Signet Books.

== Plot summary ==
The plot follows actor Murray Douglas as he joins a theatre production with a group of other actors. Each of the cast members has had career problems because of drugs, alcohol, or other kinks. The play is an avant-garde one, a form of improv where the actors make up the script during rehearsal, and rehearsals take place in an isolated country house. It emerges that the alleged playwright is feeding each participant's vices, using a futuristic form of sleep learning to overcome their attempts to stay "clean". This is being done to benefit the prurient interests of decadent time travellers.

== Sources ==
- Brunner, John (1970), The Productions of Time. Penguin Books (UK edition)'
