= Muddling spoon =

Long-handled tool in bartending

A muddling spoon is a long handled spoon used in bartending. It resembles an iced tea spoon, but typically has a smaller head. Muddling spoons are not the same as muddlers, though both are used to make mixed (typically) alcoholic drinks. Also called a "cocktail mixing spoon", the extra-long handle makes it easy to reach the bottom of tall glasses and pitchers to thoroughly stir in and blend cocktails. The twisted handle assists in building visually attractive “stacked” or layered drinks and shots, known as pousse cafe. Gently pouring alcohol and other liquids over the twist eases them into the glass and, with practice, into their own layer.
