= Into the Slave Nebula =

1968 novel by John Brunner

- First edition
- Author: John Brunner
- Cover artist: Kelly Freas
- Language: English
- Publisher: Lancer Books
- Publication date: 1968
- Media type: Print (book)
- Pages: 176
- OCLC: 860713

Into the Slave Nebula is a science fiction novel written by John Brunner and first published in 1968. It is a revised version of Slavers of Space (1960).

== Plot summary ==
Earth is a stable, prosperous, hedonistic society. The death of an android by brutal murder shocks Derry Horn, and he undertakes a dangerous interstellar mission. He is imprisoned by ruthless slavers and discovers the origin of the androids.
