= The Long Result =

1965 novel by John Brunner

- First edition
- Author: John Brunner
- Language: English
- Publisher: Faber & Faber
- Publication date: 1965

The Long Result is a 1965 science fiction novel by British writer John Brunner.

== Plot ==
In the future, the human race has developed interstellar travel and has encountered other sentient races, none of whom have developed interstellar travel of their own. The Earth has colonized two planets in hopes of creating different societies: Viridis, a Rousseau-inspired pastoral society, and Starhome, a society built almost solely for the purpose of technological advancements. Over time, Starhome has advanced beyond Earth technologically and chafes under Earth's rule.

The story follows Roald Vincent, an employee at the Bureau for Cultural Relations on Earth. He is portrayed as very smart but underachieving, his biggest ambition being to form a family with his fiancée, Patricia Ryder. His area of work relies solely on relationship with the human colonies, but he is assigned one day to meet the first Tau Cetian delegation to set foot on Earth, a race recently contacted by Starhome. His bureau has next to no information about the Tau Cetians, and the Starhomers informed Earth only at the last moment in order to make the Earth officials look bad.

There are attempts to sabotaging this encounter by the "Stars for Humans League", an extremist association which believes that humans should rule the universe and that other alien races are just feeding on humanity's progress. The League was also responsible for sabotaging a rocket containing a visiting Regulan — a fantastically adaptable and durable race — named Anovel in an attempt to kill him. Later the League tries to assassinate the Tau Cetian delegation by sabotaging the atmosphere conduits to their habitat. Roald manages to convince the Tau Cetians that it was an accident, and Roald finds himself involved in the police investigation led by Inspector Klabund.

Roald's work to accommodate the Tau Cetians and find out the truth behind the "Stars for Humans League" also affects his personal life, as his fiancée is furious about the time he spends with aliens. He also gets a proposal from Kay Lee Wong, the Starhome courier, to become the chief of a soon to be started replica of the Bureau on Starhome. Trying to escape all these problems, he visits his friend Micky Torres, a genius studying at Cambridge while also working for the Bureau. Torres tells Roald that by his assessment Starhome has become more advanced than Earth. When they fly back to the bureau's HQ to bring the news, the League tries to assassinate Torres, but inadvertently target Roald instead.

Roald becomes more and more involved in rooting out the League. His admiration for aliens rises after a couple of discussions with Anovel. He works with Inspector Klabund towards solving the various crimes instigated by the League and eventually realizes that his fiancée is working with the League and passing on information she learns from him.

Roald's Bureau chief, Tinescu, proposes him to be his successor, but Roald accepts the Starhomer offer instead, pointing out that they are the way of the future. He also contacts Anovel and tells him that he has figured out that Regulans are actually colonists of another species which has discovered space flight long before humans, but chose not to reveal themselves. Anovel confirms everything he has said, and also mentioned that contact with the humans will be made in fifty years time if all goes well; he then erases that information from Roald's mind as he deems it too early for any non-Regulan to know.

In the epilogue, an older Roald celebrates his fiftieth year of leading the Bureau of Cultural Relations on Starhome, as well as fifty years of marriage and family with Kay. Earth has gracefully ceded leadership of humanity to Starhome, and Micky Torres has created a council of planets of all races, and is to become its first leader. These achievements are enough to convince the Regulans to finally reveal themselves. A distressed employee of the Bureau reports that a Regulan ship has been spotted and is trying to make contact with Starhome, at which point Roald remembers the conversation with Anovel from fifty years back.

== Theme ==
The book addresses racial problems through the lens of human-alien relations. In Brunner's imagined future, racism is no longer a problem among humans, but exists in the attitude of some humans toward aliens, and must be fought against by the protagonists. Writing for Vector, the critical magazine of the British Science Fiction Association, Robert Edgar observes, "Here the message of the rights of the individual, of whatever origin, are upheld. It is hammered home by the lavish characterisation and description of the four species of alien and the truth about the human trait of imagined superiority."

== Critical reception ==
Writing for the New England Science Fiction Association, Mark L. Olson said, "It's a quiet, uncomplicated story that proceeds in a straight-forward way, but does an extremely effective job of it." Gideon Marcus of Galactic Journey had more muted praise, saying, "What keeps Result out of four-star territory is its shallowness... But as a read, it’s extremely brisk and enjoyable, which puts it on the good side of three stars."
