= John Brunner (author) =

British science fiction author (1934–1995)

- Brunner c. 1967
- Born: John Kilian Houston Brunner; 24 September 1934; Wallingford, Oxfordshire, England
- Died: 25 August 1995 (aged 60); Glasgow, Scotland
- Occupation: Novelist
- Writing career
- Period: 1951–1995
- Genres: Science fiction, fantasy
- Notable works: Stand on Zanzibar (1968); The Jagged Orbit (1969); The Sheep Look Up (1972); The Shockwave Rider (1975)

John Kilian Houston Brunner (24 September 1934 – 25 August 1995) was a British author of science fiction novels and stories. His 1968 novel Stand on Zanzibar, about an overpopulated world, won the 1969 Hugo Award for best science fiction novel and the BSFA Award the same year. The Jagged Orbit won the BSFA Award in 1970. His first novel, Galactic Storm, was written under the pen-name Gill Hunt when he was seventeen. He did not start writing full-time until 1958, some years after his military service.

== Life ==
Brunner was born in 1934 in Preston Crowmarsh, near Wallingford in Oxfordshire, and went to school at St Andrew's Prep School, Pangbourne. He did his upper studies at Cheltenham College. He served as an officer in the Royal Air Force from 1953 to 1955. He married Marjorie Rosamond Sauer on 12 July 1958.

Brunner had an uneasy relationship with British new wave writers, who often considered him too American in his settings and themes. He attempted to shift to a more mainstream readership in the early 1980s, without success. Before his death, most of his books had fallen out of print. Brunner accused publishers of a conspiracy against him, although he was known to be difficult to deal with. His wife, Marjorie Brunner, had handled his publishing relations before she died.

Brunner's health began to decline in the 1980s and worsened with the death of his wife in 1986. He remarried, to Li Yi Tan, on 27 September 1991. He died of a heart attack in Glasgow on 25 August 1995, while attending the World Science Fiction Convention there.

== Literary works ==
At first writing conventional space opera, Brunner later began to experiment with the novel form. His 1968 novel Stand on Zanzibar exploits the fragmented organizational style that American writer John Dos Passos created for his U.S.A. trilogy, but updates it in terms of the theory of media popularised by Canadian academic Marshall McLuhan, a major cultural figure of the period.

The Jagged Orbit (1969) is set in a United States dominated by weapons proliferation and interracial violence. Its 100 numbered chapters vary in length from a single syllable to several pages. The Sheep Look Up (1972) depicts ecological catastrophe in America.

Brunner is credited with coining the term "worm" (in computing) and predicting the emergence of computer viruses in his 1975 novel The Shockwave Rider, in which he used the term to describe software that reproduces itself across a computer network. Brunner's work has also been credited for prefiguring modern developments such as genetic engineering, same-sex marriage, online encyclopedias, the legalization of cannabis, and the development of Viagra.

These four novels Stand on Zanzibar (1968), The Jagged Orbit (1969), The Sheep Look Up (1972) and The Shockwave Rider (1975), have been called the "Club of Rome Quartet", named after the Club of Rome, whose 1972 report The Limits to Growth warned of the dire effects of overpopulation.

Brunner's pen names include K. H. Brunner (Kilian Houston Brunner), Gill Hunt, John Loxmith, Trevor Staines, Ellis Quick, Henry Crosstrees Jr., and Keith Woodcott.

In addition to fiction, Brunner wrote poetry and published many unpaid articles in a variety of venues, particularly fanzines. He also published 13 letters to the New Scientist and an article about the educational relevance of science fiction in Physics Education. Brunner was an active member of the organisation Campaign for Nuclear Disarmament and wrote the words to "The H-Bomb's Thunder", which was sung on the Aldermaston Marches. He was a linguist, translator, and Guest of Honour at the first European Science Fiction Convention Eurocon-1 in Trieste in 1972.

== Film and TV ==
Brunner wrote the screenplay for the science fiction film The Terrornauts (1967) by Amicus Productions.

Two of his short stories, "Some Lapse of Time" and "The Last Lonely Man", were adapted as TV plays in the BBC science fiction series Out of the Unknown, in series 1 (1965) and series 3 (1969), respectively.

== Works ==
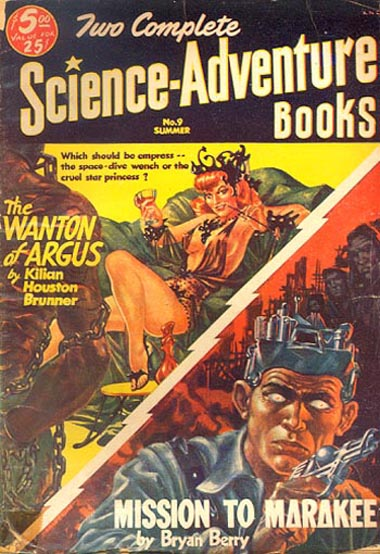
Brunner's short novel The Wanton of Argus was originally published in Two Complete Science-Adventure Books in 1953, before appearing in book form as The Space-Time Juggler.

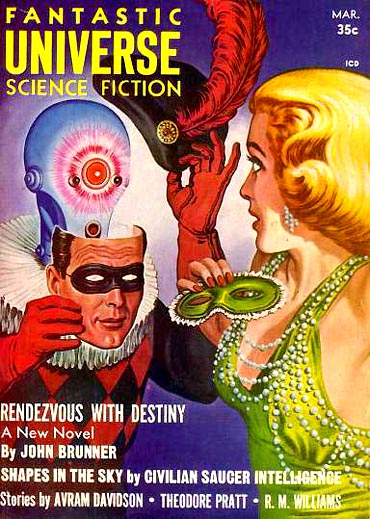
Brunner's novelette Rendezvous With Destiny was cover-featured on the March 1958 issue of Fantastic Universe.

=== Science fiction and fantasy novels ===
- Galactic Storm (1951) (as Gill Hunt)
- Threshold of Eternity, Ace D-335 (1959)
- The 100th Millennium, Ace D-362 (1959); based on "Earth Is But a Star", revised as Catch a Falling Star, Ace G-761 (1968)
- Echo in the Skull, Ace D-385 (1959); revised as Give Warning to the World, DAW 112 (1974)
- The World Swappers, Ace D-391 (1959)
- The Brink, Gollancz (1959)
- Slavers of Space, Ace D-421 (1960); revised as Into the Slave Nebula, Lancer (1968)
- The Skynappers, Ace D-457 (1960)
- The Atlantic Abomination, Ace D-465 (1960)
- Sanctuary in the Sky, Ace D-471 (1960)
- I Speak for Earth, Ace D-497 (1961) (as Keith Woodcott)
- Meeting at Infinity, Ace D-507 (1961)
- Secret Agent of Terra, Ace F-133 (1962); revised as The Avengers of Carrig, Dell (1969). Book 1 of the "Zarathustra Refugee Planets" series.
- The Super Barbarians, Ace D-547 (1962)
- The Ladder in the Sky, Ace F-141 (1962) (as Keith Woodcott)
- The Dreaming Earth, Pyramid F-829 (1963); revision of 1961 serial "Put Down This Earth"
- The Psionic Menace, Ace F-199 (1963) (as Keith Woodcott)
- Listen! The Stars!, Ace F-215 (1963); revised as The Stardroppers, DAW 23 (1972)
- The Astronauts Must Not Land, Ace F-227 (1963); revised in 1973 as More Things in Heaven, Dell (1973)
- The Space-Time Juggler, Ace F-227 (1963); also published as The Wanton of Argus
- Castaways' World, Ace F-242 (1963); revised as Polymath, DAW UQ1089 (1974). Book 2 of the "Zarathustra Refugee Planets" series.
- The Rites of Ohe, Ace F-242 (1963)
- To Conquer Chaos, Ace F-277 (1964), DAW 422 (1981)
- Endless Shadow, Ace F-299 (1964); revised as Manshape, DAW 498 (1982)
- The Whole Man, Ballantine (1964); also published as Telepathist, Faber and Faber (1965)
- The Martian Sphinx, Ace F-320 (1965) (as Keith Woodcott)
- Enigma from Tantalus, Ace M-115 (1965)
- The Repairmen of Cyclops, Ace M-115 (1965). Book 3 of the "Zarathustra Refugee Planets" series.
- The Altar on Asconel, Ace M-123 (1965) (serialised as "The Altar at Asconel")
- The Day of the Star Cities, Ace F-361 (1965); revised as Age of Miracles, Ace (1973), Sidgwick & Jackson (1973)
- The Long Result, Faber & Faber (1965), Ballantine U2329 (1966), Penguin 2804 (1968)
- The Squares of the City, Ballantine (1965), Penguin 2686 (1969)
- A Planet of Your Own, Ace G-592 (1966)
- The Productions of Time, Signet (1967), Penguin 3141 (1970), DAW 261 (1977)
- Born Under Mars, Ace G-664 (1967)
- Quicksand, Doubleday (1967), Bantam S4212 (1969), DAW 1245 (1976)
- Bedlam Planet, Ace G-709 (1968), Del Rey (1982)
- Stand on Zanzibar, Doubleday (1968), Ballantine 01713 (1969), Arrow (1971), Millennium (1999), Orb (2011)
- The Evil That Men Do, Belmont (1969)
- Double, Double, Ballantine 72019 (1969)
- The Jagged Orbit, Ace Special (1969), Sidgwick & Jackson (1970), DAW 570 (1984), Gollancz (2000)
- Timescoop, Dell 8916 (1969), Sidgwick & Jackson (1972), DAW 599 (1984)
- The Gaudy Shadows, Constable (1970), Beagle (9171)
- The Wrong End of Time, Doubleday (1971), DAW 61 (1973)
- The Dramaturges of Yan, Ace (1972), New English Library (1974), Del Rey (1982)
- The Sheep Look Up, Harper & Row (1972), Ballantine (1973), Quartet (1977)
- The Stone That Never Came Down, Doubleday (1973), DAW 133 (1984), New English Library (1976)
- Total Eclipse, Doubleday (1974), DAW 162 (1975), Orbit (1976)
- Web of Everywhere, Bantam (1974), New English Library (1977). Also published as The Webs of Everywhere, Del Rey (1983).
- The Shockwave Rider, Harper & Row (1975), Ballantine (1976), Orbit (1977)
- The Infinitive of Go, Del Rey (1980), Magnum (1981)
- Players at the Game of People, Del Rey (1980)
- The Crucible of Time, Del Rey (1983), Arrow (1984)
- The Tides of Time, Del Rey (1984), Penguin (1986)
- The Shift Key, Methuen (1987)
- Children of the Thunder, Del Rey (1989), Orbit (1990)
- A Maze of Stars, Del Rey (1991)
- Muddle Earth, Del Rey (1993)

=== Spy ===
Max Curfew Series

- A Plague on Both Your Causes, Hodder & Stoughton (1969). Also published as Backlash, Pyramid T-2107 (1969).
- Good Men Do Nothing, Hodder & Stoughton (1971), Pyramid T2443 (1971)
- Honky in the Woodpile, Constable (1971)

=== Collections ===
- No Future in It, Gollancz (1962). Doubleday (1964), Panther (1965), Curtis (1969).
- Times Without Number, Ace F-161 (1962); revised and expanded Ace (1969)
- Now Then!, Mayflower-Dell (1965). Also published as Now Then, Avon (1968).
- No Other Gods But Me, Compact F317 (1966)
- Out of My Mind, Ballantine (1967); abridged variant, NEL (1968)
- Not Before Time, NEL (1968)
- The Traveller in Black, Ace Special (1971); revised and expanded by one story as The Compleat Traveller in Black, Bluejay (1986)
- From This Day Forward, Doubleday (1972), DAW 72 (1973)
- Entry to Elsewhen, DAW 26 (1972)
- Time-Jump, Dell (1973)
- The Book of John Brunner, DAW 177 (1976)
- Interstellar Empire, DAW 208 (1976); a collection of a novella and two "Ace Double" halves: The Altar on Asconel, "The Man from the Big Dark" and The Space-Time Juggler (under the title of The Wanton of Argus)
- Foreign Constellations, Everest House (1980)
- The Best of John Brunner, Del Rey (1988)
- Victims of the Nova, Arrow (1989). Complete Zarathustra Refugee Planets series. Omnibus of Polymath, Secret Agent of Terra and The Repairmen of Cyclops
- The Man Who Was Secrett and Other Stories, Ramble House (2013)

=== Poetry ===
- Life in an Explosive Forming Press (1970)
- Trip: A Sequence of Poems Through the USA (1971)
- A Hastily Thrown Together Bit of Zork (1974)
- Tomorrow May Be Even Worse (1978)
- A New Settlement of Old Scores (1983)

=== Nongenre ===
- The Crutch of Memory, Barrie & Rockliff (1964). Conventional novel set in Greece.
- Wear the Butchers' Medal Pocket (1965). Mystery set in Europe featuring neo-Nazis.
- Black Is the Color, Pyramid (1969, republished in 2015). Horror fiction about the "swinging London" underground in the 1960s.
- The Devil's Work, W. W. Norton & Company (1970). Centres on a modern-day Hellfire Club.
- The Great Steamboat Race, Ballantine (1983). Historical fiction based on an actual event.
- The Days of March, Kerosina (1988). Novel about the early days of the Campaign for Nuclear Disarmament.

=== Pornography ===
- The Incestuous Lovers (1969) (as Henry Crosstrees, Jr.). Original title Malcolm and Sarah.
- Ball in the Family (1973) (as Ellis Quick)

=== Translations ===
- The Overlords of War (1973). Translated from the French. Original title Les Seigneurs de la Guerre by Gérard Klein.
