= The Jagged Orbit =

1969 novel by John Brunner

- Cover of first edition (paperback).
- Author: John Brunner
- Cover artist: Leo and Diane Dillon
- Language: English
- Genre: Science fiction, Dystopian
- Publisher: Ace Books
- Publication date: 1969
- Publication place: United Kingdom
- Media type: Print (hardback & paperback)
- Pages: 400
- ISBN: 0-02-038120-4
- OCLC: 234241728

The Jagged Orbit is a science fiction novel by British writer John Brunner. It is similar to his earlier novel Stand on Zanzibar in its narrative style and dystopic outlook. It has exactly 100 titled chapters, which vary from several pages to part of one word. It was first published in 1969 with cover art by Leo and Diane Dillon, in the Ace Science Fiction Specials line issued by Ace Books.

The Jagged Orbit was nominated for the Nebula Award for Best Novel in 1969, and won the BSFA Award for the best SF novel in 1970.

== Plot summary ==
The novel is set in the United States in 2014, when interracial tensions have passed the breaking point. A Mafia-like cartel, the Gottschalks, are exploiting this situation to sell weapons to anyone able to buy them. A split develops within the cartel, between the conservative old men and ambitious underlings prepared to use new computer technology to pull off some spectacular coups.

There are several separate strands of narrative following particular characters. James Reedeth is a young psychologist at New York's major mental health institution who is disenchanted with his job and his employer, the revered Elias Mogshack. Lyla Clay is a "pythoness," a young woman capable of metabolising certain psychedelic drugs to enter a trance in which she makes unconscious predictions. Matthew Flamen, a "spoolpigeon" (a variety of investigative journalist), is struggling to hold onto his job, and by his obsessive behaviour has driven his wife into Mogshack's asylum.

The plot is contrived to bring the strands together and resolve matters by a lengthy discussion between Flamen, Reedeth, Lyla Clay, Pedro Diablo (Flamen's African-American counterpart), Xavier Conroy (a long-time critic of Mogshack), and Harry Madison (a former patient at Mogshack's asylum).

== Reception ==
Analog reviewer P. Schuyler Miller praised the novel as a "beautiful job—intricate yet tightly constructed, thoroughly believable with as many important characters as a Victorian classic." James Blish, however, lambasted The Jagged Orbit for pursuing an already exhausted mainstream model, producing a text "embodying almost none of Brunner's strengths, loaded to the gunwales with typographical tricks, as full of compulsive cuteness as Stalin-era Shostakovich, its very length pretentious and inhibiting, containing a vast cast of characters all of whom are in the end regressions to the funny-hat school".
