= Muddle Earth (Brunner novel) =

1993 novel by John Brunner

Web of Everywhere
- Cover of the first edition, with art by John Berkey
- Author: John Brunner
- Cover artist: John Berkey
- Language: English
- Genre: Science fiction
- Publisher: Ballantine Del Rey Books
- Publication date: 1993
- Publication place: USA
- Media type: Print (hardback and paperback)
- Pages: 148
- ISBN: 0-345-37851-2
- OCLC: 28660341

Muddle Earth is a science fiction novel by British writer John Brunner. It was first published in the United States by Ballantine Del Rey Books in 1993. It tells the story of a man awakened from cryogenic suspension in a bizarre 24th century where Earth is a tourist attraction.
