= The Whole Man =

1964 novel by John Brunner

- Ballantine First Edition paperback cover
- Author: John Brunner
- Language: English
- Genre: Science fiction novel
- Publisher: Ballantine Books
- Publication date: 1964
- Publication place: United States
- Media type: Print (Hardcover & Paperback)
- Pages: 188 pp

The Whole Man is a 1964 science fiction novel by John Brunner. It was nominated for a Hugo Award for Best Novel in 1965. In the UK, it was published under the title Telepathist.

This novel is often considered a turning point in Brunner's career, a step up from the space operas he'd been turning out as Ace Doubles and pointing towards the richer, more complex books exemplified by Quicksand and Stand on Zanzibar.

The book is a fix-up novel based on three earlier stories:

- "City of the Tiger" in Science Fantasy, December 1958
- "The Whole Man" in Science Fantasy, April 1959
- "Curative Telepath" in Fantastic Universe, December 1959

== Plot summary ==
After an unspecified crisis in a near-future England where telepathy has been discovered, the authorities discover Gerald Howson, a physically deformed youth with greater telepathic power than has ever been seen before. The novel details Howson's struggles to come to grips with his power and his deformity.
