= The Infinitive of Go =

1980 novel by John Brunner

- Mass market paperback cover.
- Author: John Brunner
- Cover artist: Darrell K. Sweet
- Language: English
- Genre: Science fiction
- Publisher: Ballantine/Del Rey imprint
- Publication date: 1980
- Publication place: United Kingdom
- Media type: Print (Paperback)
- Pages: 154 pp
- ISBN: 0-345-28497-6
- OCLC: 6083220

The Infinitive of Go is a 1980 science fiction novel by British writer John Brunner.

== Synopsis ==
The novel revolves around a teleportation technology which is being developed. The first test is an abject failure, the subject acting paranoid and committing suicide. Faced with termination of the project, Dr. Justin Williams, the inventor of the technology, performs the next test himself. He finds himself in a world which is subtly different from his own, one in which he and Cinnamon Wright, his collaborator in the invention of the technology, are lovers. It is revealed that when humans are "Posted" (transported), their inner desires influence the outcome, tipping them into alternate universes.

When Dr. Eduardo Landini is Posted back from an orbiting space station following a mechanical accident, the being who emerges is a humanoid descended from baboons, who claims to be Ed Landini. Rumors about his appearance inspire revulsion among staff members at the facility, and as those rumours spread into the general population, others begin exploiting the fears generated for their own purposes. Landini himself has no stomach for the attention, and openly shows his contempt for the behaviour of the humans around him. In his world, the side effects of being Posted are well known. Mystics and pilgrims use it to go to other worlds, and his world receives visitors in return. He also says that the typical outcome of the discovery of the multiverse is that the inventors of the technology go insane.

Justin and Cinnamon are taken to a secret facility by Myron Chester, the billionaire financier of the project. There they are told about experiments where items are Posted one-way with no target destination. The result is a wealth of information about other worlds completely different from their own, and a message with a warning: if the inventors of teleportation are not the first to undertake a one-way journey themselves, the outcome is almost always bad. If they are, the outcome is almost always beneficial. Justin and Cinnamon are left to consider their fate.

== Reception ==
Greg Costikyan reviewed The Infinitive of Go in Ares Magazine #2 and commented that "The story is well written, as one has come to expect from John Brunner, and his plot is engaging."

== Reviews ==
- Review by John Hobson (1982) in Paperback Inferno, Volume 5, Number 6
- Review [German] by Harald Pusch (1983) in Science Fiction Times, Juli 1983
