= The Squares of the City =

1965 novel by John Brunner

- Cover art from first edition
- Author: John Brunner
- Cover artist: Robert Foster
- Language: English
- Genre: Science fiction
- Publisher: Ballantine Books
- Publication date: 1965
- Publication place: United States
- Media type: Print (Paperback)
- Pages: 319 pp

The Squares of the City is a science fiction novel by British writer John Brunner, first published in 1965 (ISBN 0-345-27739-2). It was nominated for the Hugo Award for Best Novel in 1966.

It is a sociological story of urban class warfare and political intrigue, taking place in the fictional South American capital city of Vados. It explores the idea of subliminal messages as political tools, and it is notable for having the structure of a famous 1892 game of chess between Wilhelm Steinitz and Mikhail Chigorin. The structure is not coincidental, and plays an important part in the story.

== Reception ==
Algis Budrys found the novel to be more artifice than fiction, saying "this is a confusing, overpopulated, almost-unidentifiable-with story set in a city which seems to have been created for the sole purpose of having Brunner set a 'human chess game' in motion upon it. . . . There is nothing in particular here to catch and hold the reader's involvement". Judith Merril, however, found Squares "an impressive piece of work" with "complexities [that] add richness rather than spread confusion." She noted, however, that the demands of the novel's "elaborate structure" weakened it by impelling Brunner to sacrifice character development in order to depict "interpersonal exchanges."

== Sources ==
- Tuck, Donald H. (1974). The Encyclopedia of Science Fiction and Fantasy. Chicago: Advent. p. 71. ISBN 0-911682-20-1.
