= The Shockwave Rider =

1975 science fiction novel by John Brunner

- Cover of first edition (hardcover)
- Author: John Brunner
- Cover artist: Creston Ely
- Language: English
- Genre: Science fiction
- Publisher: Harper & Row
- Publication date: 1975
- Publication place: United Kingdom
- Media type: Print (hardback and paperback)
- Pages: 288
- ISBN: 0-06-010559-3
- OCLC: 1093694
- Dewey Decimal: 823/.9/14
- LC Class: PZ4.B89 Sj3 PR6052.R8

The Shockwave Rider is a science fiction novel by John Brunner, originally published in 1975. It is notable for its hero's use of computer hacking skills to escape pursuit in a dystopian future, and for the coining of the word "worm" to describe a program that propagates itself through a computer network. It also introduces the concept of a Delphi pool, perhaps derived from the RAND Corporation's Delphi method – a prediction market on world events which bears close resemblance to DARPA's controversial and cancelled Policy Analysis Market.

== Origin of the title ==
The title derives from the futurist work Future Shock by Alvin Toffler. The protagonist is a survivor in a world of quickly changing identities, fashions, and lifestyles, where individuals are oppressed by a powerful, secretive state apparatus. His highly developed computer skills enable him to use any public telephone to punch in a new identity, thus reinventing himself, within hours. As a fugitive, he must do this from time to time to avoid capture.

== Plot introduction ==
The novel shows a dystopian early 21st-century America dominated by computer networks. The hero, Nick Haflinger, is a runaway from Tarnover, a government program intended to find, educate and indoctrinate highly gifted children to further the interests of the state in a future where quantitative analysis backed by the tacit threat of coercion has replaced overt military and economic power as the deciding factor in international competition. In parallel with this, the government has become a de facto oligarchy that is effectively an offshoot of organised crime.

Nick's talent extends to programming the network using only a touch-tone telephone. One of his handlers at Tarnover explains that this is like a classical pianist being able to play entire sonatas and concertos from memory. However, Nick also has some personality flaws, amounting almost to a deathwish. These become manifest in exhibitions of his abilities, revealing his identity to his pursuers.

The background to the story includes a massive earthquake laying waste to the San Francisco Bay Area in California. Millions die and millions more are left to live on government handouts. The subsequent economic depression, coupled with the rootlessness enabled by access to online data and strong social pressure to be flexible (the results of corporations wanting highly mobile workforces without strong local ties), results in a fragmentation of society along religious, ethnic, and a variety of class markers, what Toffler called "subcults", including what would in 2010 be described as gangs. The equitable distribution of data access and data privacy is a prominent theme in the book; characters who have access to information which is nominally secret enjoy demonstrable economic advantages over others lacking access to such data. In the novel, data privacy is reserved for corporations and powerful individuals, who may then conceal wrongdoing; by contrast, normal citizens do not enjoy significant privacy.

The world described in the book is dystopian, with laissez-faire economics portrayed as leading to disaster as greed trumps long-term planning. The educational system is dysfunctional, with teachers unable to perform their jobs due to strictures. The only functional educational system seen in the book is portrayed as an enclave, the tightly controlled Tarnover school. Communities are either walled enclaves of privilege or largely lawless areas entirely lacking protection from corrupt civil authorities. Infrastructure has been allowed to crumble, and characters who reside within "paid avoidance zones" receive compensation from the government in lieu of actual services.

== Plot summary ==
The novel is set in the weeks following Nick's recapture after several years on the run, alternating between moral arguments with his interrogator, who is trying to discover why the program's star pupil had absconded, and flashbacks of his career. The interrogator is Paul Freeman, a graduate of another secret installation known as Electric Skillet, which focuses on weapons and defence strategy.

Although he had initially felt at home at Tarnover, Nick eventually becomes aware of experiments in genetic engineering being performed there. These produce monstrous deformed children who are disposed of when they are no longer needed for study. At this point Nick becomes determined to escape. He studies data processing, steals a personal ID code intended for privileged individuals who wish to live their lives without surveillance, and goes on the run. He uses the stolen 4GH computer access code to cover his data trails and create new identities for himself, easily adopting entire new personas. One is the pastor of a popular church, another is a successful computer consultant.

In this last role, calling himself Sandy Locke, he becomes the lover of Ina Grierson, a top executive at Ground to Space Industries, a powerful "hypercorp" known to all as G2S. Intending to use the computer facilities at G2S to ensure that his stolen code is still valid, he signs on as a "systems rationalizer" with the company. This brings him into contact with Ina's daughter, Kate, who attracts him despite her plain appearance and simple lifestyle. At the age of 22, Nick's age when he left Tarnover, Kate is a perpetual student at the University of Missouri–Kansas City. She is perceptive enough to penetrate Nick's adopted persona, deeply disturbing him even though she fascinates him. He visits her at home, helping her to clean out some of her possessions, and meeting her tame cougar, Bagheera – the product of her late father's genetic research into intelligence. He died shortly after abandoning the research because the government was using it to produce animals for military uses.

The 21st-century lifestyle produces a symptom called "overload" in many people, and most, including Nick, take tranquilizers to some degree. However Nick collapses completely when told that a representative from Tarnover is coming to his promotional interview at G2S. He returns to Kate and confesses that he is not what he seems, asking for her help. She conducts him to one of the "paid avoidance areas" in California, where people are paid to do without the full panoply of modern technology, as an alternative to spending billions to rebuild infrastructure after the earthquake. After Nick risks exposure yet again in one of these places, they move to the least known one, a town called Precipice.

Precipice turns out to be a Utopian community of a few thousand people. The nearest comparison would be an agrarian, cottage industry community designed by William Morris. Precipice is also the home of Hearing Aid, an anonymous telephone confession service accessible to anyone in the country. Hearing Aid is also known as the "Ten Nines", after the phone number used to call it: 999-999-9999. People call the service, a human operator answers, and they simply talk while the operator listens. Some rant, others seek sympathy, still others commit suicide while on the phone. Hearing Aid's promise is that nobody else, not even the government, will hear the call. The only response Hearing Aid gives to a caller is "Only I heard that, I hope it helped."

Nick and Kate settle into the community. The inhabitants include intelligent dogs that escaped from the projects that Kate's father worked on. These act as companions, guards, nannies, and even lie detectors, using their sense of smell. Nick rewrites the "computer tapeworm" that prevents the calls to Hearing Aid being monitored. While at G2S he became aware of massive backups of data being performed, clearly in anticipation of a major network outage. The Hearing Aid worm is designed to scramble network traffic if attacked, but Nick realises that it could be destroyed if the authorities were prepared for the effects and ready to recover from them. His new worm, which he calls a "phage", cannot be removed without dismantling the entire network.

Possibly encouraged by the government, local gangs and tribes raid Precipice, burning down Nick and Kate's house before being overwhelmed by the dogs. Nick, suffering another overload, blames Kate for the incident, since she, following Hearing Aid policy, cut off a call from someone attempting to warn Precipice. He hits her, and then, filled with remorse, leaves the town. He finally reveals his location to the authorities when, encountering one of the "Roman circus" operations which broadcast live fights and other bloody exhibitions to the country, he responds to an "all comers" challenge by the father of the leader of one of the gangs, and cripples him in front of a nationwide audience.

At Tarnover, Paul Freeman takes charge of the interrogation. He was the representative whom Nick, as Sandy Locke, was supposed to meet at G2S. Freeman, a tall gaunt African-American, gradually comes to realise that he has more sympathy with Nick's views than his employer's, and eventually absconds himself, giving Nick computer access so that Nick can make his own escape. The precipitating event in this case is Kate's abduction by government agents, who bring her to Tarnover for further questioning and to threaten Nick.

With the code he gets from Freeman, he sets up an identity as an Army major, with Kate as his prisoner. Once clear of Tarnover, they disappear together. This time around, Nick has another plan, and rather than running and hiding, he and Kate spend a number of months travelling the country, aided by an "invisible college" of academics who are allies or former residents of Precipice. He creates a new "worm" which is designed to destroy all secrecy. (Brunner invented the term worm for this program, as a self-replicating program that propagates across a computer network – the word was later adopted by computer researchers as the name for this type of program.)

The worm is eventually activated, and the details of all the government's dark secrets (clandestine genetic experimentation that produces crippled children, bribes and kickbacks from corporations, concealed crimes of high public officials) now become accessible from anywhere on the network – in fact, those most affected by a particular crime of a government official are emailed the full details. In place of the old system, Nick has designed the worm to enforce a kind of utilitarian socialism, with people's worth being defined by their roles in society, not their connections in high places. In effect, the network becomes the entire government and financial system, policing income for illegal money, freezing the accounts of criminals, while making sure money (or credit) flows to places where people are in need. This will only happen fully if the results of a plebiscite, again conducted over the network, allow it.

In a final atavistic attempt at revenge, the government orders a nuclear strike by a single aircraft from a local Air Force base. Warned by Hearing Aid, Nick is able to penetrate the military computers and manufacture a counter-order to stop the plane just before it reaches the town. The book ends optimistically, with there being no more privileged hiding of information, no more secret conspiracies of the rich and powerful.

== Characters ==
- Nick Haflinger is a wanderer, a man without a place to call his own, or a people he can identify with. His parents ceased to care for him at an early age, and he became a "rent-a-kid", living with a succession of mobile couples who had no time to settle down and start families of their own. Only when he was noticed by a schoolteacher, and subsequently recruited for Tarnover, did he find a group of people with whom he could identify.
- Kate Lilleberg is the daughter of a high-powered executive mother and a genius scientist father. She seems content to be a perpetual student, however, until she meets Nick, seeing in him a real person under the false persona. Unlike her friends, she is capable of deep commitment, as exemplified by her fulfilling her promise to her dead father, and caring for the cougar, Bagheera, bred by her father for his researches. Her chosen life has one feature her mother cannot appreciate: it allows her to remain in one place.
- Paul T. Freeman has spent his 39 years studying, learning, and believing in the objectives of Tarnover and Electric Skillet. Nick's plan is to lead him to areas where his high intelligence will question his perceptions and beliefs, resulting in the inevitable turning away from the power elite he serves.
- Ralph C. Hartz is the deputy director of the Bureau of Data Processing, and the man to whom Paul Freeman reports his progress on interrogating Nick. However he himself serves entrenched interests in Washington D.C. When Nick, with Paul's help, escapes with even more powerful codes than before, he is ruthlessly cast aside, not least because his superiors refuse to accept that the new codes must be disabled so soon after replacing the old ones.
- Ina Grierson, Kate's mother, lives in world of personal power but is as prone to paranoia as the lowest of her underlings. Good looking at the age of forty-something, she clings to her youthfulness, partly by taking younger lovers. The stress of living in a connected world is partly defused by luxury vacations, on one of which she meets "Sandy Locke". Later, after Kate is abducted she is jolted out of her complacency, and with the aid of software written by "Sandy" she is able to penetrate the government smokescreen.

== Reception ==
Spider Robinson gave the novel a mixed review, saying that while "the book reads well ..., [i]ndividual sections are often brilliant, [and] the message is incisive and timely", that "as a story it limps" and that many characters, including the main antagonists, "are cut from cardboard". The New York Times reviewer Gerald Jonas was even more critical, saying that while Brunner was attempting to write "slice-of-life" fiction about a future society, the result of his arbitrary choices about social details is that "the entire fictional edifice collapses like a house of cards."

== Themes ==
The novel was written shortly after two pivotal events of the 1970s, the resignation of Richard Nixon and the overthrow of the Chilean President Salvador Allende, which are cited in the novel as examples, in Nixon's case, of a failed attempt by organised crime to suborn the Presidency, and in the second, of the consequences of working against multinational commercial interests.

Most of the characters live with the feeling that their lives could be turned upside down in an instant because of someone breaking into the data held on the network. They also believe that the network knows more about them than they do about themselves. This is an extension of the sense of paranoia felt by many people in the 1970s, believing themselves to be powerless in the face of political and economic forces over which they had no control.

Perception is a recurrent theme in the novel. In particular, Brunner is concerned with perceptual patterns and how they can both help and mislead. Nick projects patterns of behaviour to assume his personas, but Kate has "natural wisdom" which means that she ignores surface patterns to perceive the truth beneath. When they arrive in Precipice, the couple have to abandon their normal "urban pattern" to see the ways in which the town's unique design merges public and private space, along with natural and artificial structures.

The theme of patterns in perception runs through the entire novel. Future shock arises when reality and change disrupt patterns. People respond by falling into strong patterns within human nature, particularly tribalism.

Others try to convince themselves that all change is good, adopting the "plug-in" lifestyle where they feel able to relocate to another city and insert themselves into a new social niche with a minimum of inconvenience. Their mobility is, however, a reflection of the failure of the lifestyle to satisfy them, resulting in more moves.

In this world of confusion are also companies specialising in psychological intervention. One such is Anti-Trauma Inc. which is hired to "normalise" children in a process akin to deprogramming, the (often violent) attempt to force people to renounce their association with groups perceived as cults. Anti-Trauma does significant harm to its charges, although as so often happens in Brunner's interconnected society, it also spends much money and time covering up its failures.

=== The worm ===
Brunner's concept of the computer worm was inspired by analogy with the tapeworm, a digestive parasite. A biological tapeworm consists of a head attached to a long train of reproductive segments, each of which can produce more worms when detached. Brunner's "data-net tapeworm" consists of a head followed by other segments, each being some kind of code which has effects on databases and other systems. Several are unleashed in the book. Besides the two Hearing Aid tapeworms, and Nick's ultimate tapeworm, there is a "denunciation tapeworm" created as revenge by a representative of Anti-Trauma Inc. whom Nick insults and curses. At the time, Nick was playing the role of a priest in a revivalist church. The worm's intent was to destroy the church by cancelling all its utility services. Nick in turn sends another worm into the network to destroy that one.
