= Stand on Zanzibar =

1968 novel by John Brunner

- Cover of first edition (hardcover)
- Author: John Brunner
- Cover artist: S. A. Summit, Inc.
- Language: English
- Genre: Science fiction, dystopian
- Publisher: Doubleday
- Publication date: 1968
- Publication place: United Kingdom
- Media type: Hardback & paperback
- Pages: 582

Stand on Zanzibar is a dystopian New Wave science fiction novel written by John Brunner and first in part published in New Worlds magazine in 1967 and in book form in 1968. The book won a Hugo Award for Best Novel at the 27th World Science Fiction Convention in 1969, as well as the 1969 BSFA Award and the 1973 Prix Tour-Apollo Award.

== Description ==
The novel is about overpopulation and its projected consequences. The story is set in 2010, mostly in the United States. The narrative follows the lives of a large cast of characters, chosen to give a broad cross-section of the future world. Some of these interact directly with the central narrative, while others add depth to Brunner's world. Brunner appropriated this narrative technique from the U.S.A. trilogy, by John Dos Passos.

The main story is about two New York men, Donald Hogan and Norman Niblock House, who share an apartment. House is a rising executive at General Technics, one of the powerful corporations. Using his "Afram" (African American) heritage to advance his position, he has risen to vice-president at age twenty-six.

The two plots concern the fictional African state of Beninia making a deal with General Technics to take over the management of their country, to speed up development from Third World to First World status. A second plot is a breakthrough in genetic engineering in the fictional Southeast Asian nation of Yatakang (an island nation and a former Dutch colony, like Indonesia), to which Hogan is soon sent by the United States government to investigate. The two plots cross, bringing implications for the world.

The title Stand on Zanzibar is an allusion to a thought experiment in which it was calculated that all the human beings in the world could fit shoulder to shoulder on the Isle of Wight; given population growth, Brunner expanded this to the island of Zanzibar.

== Characters ==
- Norman Niblock House, VP of HR at General Technics
- Donald Hogan, "synthesist" and spy
- Georgette Tallon Buckfast, "Old GT", founder of General Technics, 91 years old, but looking 60, her body containing many artificial parts.
- Zadkiel F. Obomi, President of Beninia
- Elihu Rodan Masters, US Ambassador to Beninia
- Professor Doctor Sugaiguntung, university department head in Yatakang
- Stallion "Stal" Lucas, a yonderboy
- Olive Almeiro, baby farmer in Puerto Rico
- Jeff Young, vendor of explosives and sabotage equipment
- Henry Butcher
- Chad C. Mulligan, former sociologist
- Jogajong, revolutionary
- Pierre Clodard, Jeannine Clodard, siblings, of pied-noir heritage
- Eric Ellerman, plant geneticist
- Poppy Shelton
- Gerry Lindt, draftee
- Guinevere Steele, née Dwiggins
- Sheena Potter, Frank Potter
- Victor Whatmough, Mary Whatmough, married
- Sasha Peterson, Philip Peterson, mother and son
- Pope Eglantine, Pope Thomas, rival popes
- Grace Rowley, 77, early dementia
- Arthur Golightly
- Bennie Noakes, addict, watches TV
- Mr and Mrs Everywhere, construct identities, like the Joneses

== Critical reception ==
Algis Budrys declared that Stand on Zanzibar "takes your breath away", saying that the novel "put[s] itself together seemingly without effort [and] paints a picture of the immediate future as it will, Brunner convinces you, certainly be". On the other hand, James Blish said "I disliked everybody in it and I was constantly impeded by the suspicion that Brunner was not writing for himself but for a Prize. ...A man of Brunner's gifts should have seen ab initio that U.S.A. was a stillbirth even in its originator's hands".

Thirty years after its publication, Greg Bear praised Stand on Zanzibar as a science fiction novel that, unusually, has not become dated. "It's not quite the future we imagined it to be, but it still reads as fresh as it did back in 1968, and that's an amazing accomplishment!" In a retrospective review for The Guardian in 2010, Sam Jordison found the novel a "skilfully realised future dystopia", writing that it allowed Brunner "to express his most interesting ideas regarding corporate ethics, free will, the question of whether scientific progress is always good for humanity and the conflict between the individual and the state". Ursula K. Heise declared that "Stand on Zanzibar, to some extent, sets the tone for literary texts from the 1980s and 1990s that re-engage the issue of population growth against the background of a multitude of interacting political, social, economic, ecological, and technological problems".

In his 2021 book Doom: The Politics of Catastrophe, historian Niall Ferguson lauds Stand on Zanzibar for foreseeing the future better than more popular novels such as Fahrenheit 451, The Handmaid's Tale and Anthem.

Yet, on further reflection, none of these authors truly foresaw all the peculiarities of our networked world, which has puzzlingly combined a rising speed and penetration of consumer information technology with a slackening of progress in other areas, such as nuclear energy, and a woeful degeneration of governance. The real prophets turn out, on closer inspection, to be less familiar figures—for example, John Brunner, whose Stand on Zanzibar (1968) is set in 2010, at a time when population pressure has led to widening social divisions and political extremism. Despite the threat of terrorism, U.S. corporations like General Technics are booming, thanks to a supercomputer named Shalmaneser. China is America's new rival. Europe has united. Brunner also foresees affirmative action, genetic engineering, Viagra, Detroit's collapse, satellite TV, in-flight video, gay marriage, laser printing, electric cars, the de-criminalization of marijuana, and the decline of tobacco. There is even a progressive president (albeit of Beninia, not America) named "Obomi".

In a 2021 article regarding the prognostic ability of novelists, The Guardian pointed out that Stand on Zanzibar had also accurately predicted the fall of the Detroit auto industry.

Westworld show creator Jonathan Nolan was partially inspired by Stand on Zanzibar when developing content for the third season.

== See also ==
- Behavioral sink
- Konrad Lorenz
- Make Room! Make Room!
- The Jagged Orbit
- The Sheep Look Up
- The Shockwave Rider
- The World Inside
