= List of Ace titles in numeric series =

In January 1969, Ace Books switched from a letter-series code for its books to a numeric series. The number does not indicate sequence of publication, unlike the number in the letter series codes; instead it identifies the alphabetic position of the title. It was assigned by dividing the range 00001-99999 into 26 sections, one for each letter of the alphabet, and then assigning the code depending on the first letters of the title. As can be seen from the list below, this approach was evidently not followed in every case, but it accounts for the great majority of the codes.

The number is also part of the ISBN, for the later titles; the ISBN for a book (if it has one) can be formed by prefixing "0" for English language/US, and "441" (Ace's publisher number), to the serial number, and then calculating the last digit with an ISBN check digit calculator. For example, Christopher Stasheff's Escape Velocity has serial number 21599; the ISBN is 0-441-21599-8.

This list is very incomplete.

- 00075 SF John Jakes When the Star Kings Die
- 00078 SF Peter George (as Peter Bryant) Red Alert (1958)
- 00078 SF R.A. Salvatore The Dragons Dagger
- 00092 NA John Macklin Dwellers in Darkness
- 00093 SF Fred Saberhagen The Black Mountains
- 00094 SF Leigh Brackett The Big Jump
- 00104 SF Mack Reynolds Section G: United Planets
- 00106 NA John Macklin Passport to the Unknown
- 00107 SF James White The Secret Visitors
- 00108 SF Roger Zelazny Four for Tomorrow
- 00109 SF Mark S. Geston Lords of the Starship
- 00110 SF Fritz Leiber Swords in the Mist
- 00111 SF John W. Campbell Invaders from the Infinite
- 00119 SF William Shatner Teksecret
- 00125 SF Mary Staton From the Legend of Biel
- 00142 SF Steve Perry The Forever Drug (1995)
- 00153 SF Fritz Leiber Swords Against Wizardry
- 00241 NA Jack Luzzatto Ace Crossword Puzzle Book#2 (1969)
- 00265 SF Mack Reynolds Ability Quotient
- 00275 SF Donald A. Wollheim (ed.) Ace Science Fiction Reader (1971)
- 00289 SF William Shatner Tekpower
- 00348 SF Greg Bear Blood Music (1996)
- 00390 SF William Shatner Tekmoney
- 00950 SF Ron Goulart After Things Fell Apart (1970)
- 00958 SF Mack Reynolds After Utopia (1977)
- 00990 SF Susan K. Putney Against Arcturus / Dean R. Koontz Time Thieves (May 1972)
- 01000 SF John Brunner Age of Miracles
- 01040 SF Larry Maddock Agent of T.E.R.R.A.#1: The Flying Saucer Gambit
- 01041 SF Larry Maddock Agent of T.E.R.R.A.#2: The Golden Goddess Gambit
- 01042 SF Larry Maddock Agent of T.E.R.R.A.#3: The Emerald Elephant Gambit
- 01043 SF Larry Maddock Agent of T.E.R.R.A.#4: The Time Trap Gambit
- 01066 SF Poul Anderson Agent of the Terran Empire
- 01501 SF Robert A. Heinlein The Worlds of Robert A. Heinlein
- 01570 SF Fletcher Pratt Alien Planet
- 01625 NA Dick Lupoff and Don Thompson (ed.) All in Color for a Dime (1970)
- 01685 SF Gordon R. Dickson Alien Art / Arcturus Landing
- 01750 SF Robert E. Howard Almuric
- 01770 SF Leigh Brackett Alpha Centauri Or Die (1976)
- 02236 SF Stanley Schmidt (ed.) Analog Yearbook Ii
- 02255 SF A. E. van Vogt Anarchistic Colossus (April 1977)
- 02268 SF Joanna Russ And Chaos Died (1970)
- 02274 SF Donald R. Bensen And Having Writ... (1978)
- 02276 MY Philip Loraine The Angel of Death (1961)
- 02295 SF Keith Roberts Anita (1970)
- 02320 SF Alexei Panshin Masque World
- 02380 SF Tim Powers The Anubis Gates
- 02900 NA John Jakes (as Jay Scotland) Arena
- 02935 SF Philip Francis Nowlan Armageddon 2419 A.D.
- 02936 SF Philip Francis Nowlan Armageddon 2419 A.D.
- 02938 SF Philip Francis Nowlan Armageddon 2419 A.D.
- 02940 NA Rona Randall The Arrogant Duke (1972)
- 03297 SF Jack Vance The Asutra
- 03300 SF John Brunner The Atlantic Abomination (1960)
- 03322 SF Edgar Rice Burroughs At the Earth's Core
- 03325 SF Edgar Rice Burroughs At the Earth's Core
- 03326 SF Edgar Rice Burroughs At the Earth's Core (1978)
- 03328 SF Edgar Rice Burroughs At the Earth's Core (1985)
- 04040 SF Joanna Russ Picnic on Paradise
- 04591 SF Samuel R. Delany Babel-17 (1966)
- 04592 SF Samuel R. Delany Babel-17 (1974)
- 04612 WE Tom West Bad Blood at Bonita Basin / Tom West Rattlesnake Range (1972)
- 04636 SF Edgar Rice Burroughs Back to the Stone Age
- 04722 SF Samuel R. Delany The Ballad of Beta 2
- 04745 NA Edgar Rice Burroughs The Bandit of Hell's Bend
- 04745 WE Edgar Rice Burroughs The Bandit of Hell's Bend
- 04755 NA E. Kelton Barbed Wire
- 04760 SF Tom Purdom The Barons of Behavior (1972)
- 04860 SF A. E. van Vogt The Battle of Forever (1971)
- 05330 SF Jack London Before Adam
- 05404 SF Fred Saberhagen Berserker
- 05407 SF Fred Saberhagen Berserker Man (April 1979)
- 05408 SF Fred Saberhagen Berserker's Planet (1980)
- 05424 SF Fred Saberhagen Berserker Man (December 1980)
- 05454 SF Edward L. Ferman (ed.) The Best from Fantasy and Science Fiction, 15th Series (1966)
- 05455 SF Edward L. Ferman (ed.) The Best from Fantasy and Science Fiction, 16th Series
- 05456 SF Edward L. Ferman (ed.) The Best from Fantasy and Science Fiction, 17th Series
- 05457 SF Edward L. Ferman (ed.) The Best from Fantasy and Science Fiction, 18th Series
- 05458 SF Edward L. Ferman (ed.) The Best from Fantasy and Science Fiction, 19th Series (1973)
- 05460 SF Edward L. Ferman (ed.) The Best from Fantasy and Science Fiction: A Special 25th Anniversary Anthology
- 05461 SF Edward L. Ferman (ed.) The Best from Fantasy and Science Fiction, 22nd Series (1978)
- 05466 SF Fred Saberhagen Berserker Man (August 1982)
- 05471 SF Fred Saberhagen Berserker Man (May 1984)
- 05475 SF Lester Del Rey (ed.) Best Science Fiction Stories of the Year (1st Annual Collection) (1972)
- 05476 SF Lester Del Rey (ed.) Best Science Fiction Stories of the Year (2nd Annual Collection)
- 05477 SF Lester Del Rey (ed.) Best Science Fiction Stories of the Year (3rd Annual Collection) (1974)
- 05478 SF Lester Del Rey (ed.) Best Science Fiction Stories of the Year (4th Annual Collection) (1977)
- 05479 SF Lester Del Rey (ed.) Best Science Fiction Stories of the Year (5th Annual Collection) (1977)
- 05481 SF Mack Reynolds The Best Ye Breed
- 05496 SF Fred Saberhagen Berserker Man
- 05500 SF Robert A. Heinlein Between Planets
- 05586 SF John Varley The Golden Globe
- 05595 SF John Rackham Beyond Capella / Kenneth Bulmer Electric Sword-Swallowers (February 1971)
- 05655 SF Edgar Rice Burroughs Beyond the Farthest Star (1973)
- 05656 SF Edgar Rice Burroughs Beyond the Farthest Star
- 05785 NA Shepherd Mead The Big Ball of Wax
- 06061 SF Leigh Brackett The Big Jump (1976)
- 06171 SF Jack Vance Big Planet (1978)
- 06177 SF Keith Laumer The Big Show
- 06505 MY Cornell Woolrich The Black Angel (1965)
- 06530 SF Michael Moorcock The Black Corridor
- 06612 SF Mack Reynolds Blackman's Burden / Border, Breed Nor Birth (August 1972)
- 06615 SF Fred Saberhagen The Black Mountains
- 06701 SF John W. Campbell The Black Star Passes
- 06707 SF Brian M. Stableford The Blind Worm / Emil Petaja Seed of the Dreamers (February 1970)
- 06715 NA Charles Lefebure The Blood Cults (1969)
- 06760 WE Ray Hogan The Bloodrock Valley War / C. Hall Thompson The Killing of Hallie James (1969)
- 06854 SF Marion Zimmer Bradley The Bloody Sun
- 07012 SF L. Sprague de Camp and Catherine Crook De Camp The Bones of Zora
- 07080 NA Joyce Keener Border-Line (1979)
- 07162 SF John Brunner Born Under Mars
- 07180 SF Marion Zimmer Bradley The Brass Dragon
- 07200 SF Jack Vance The Brave Free Men: Book II of the Durdane Trilogy
- 07690 SF Murray Leinster The Brain-Stealers
- 07840 SF Ray Cummings A Brand New World
- 07895 SF Andre Norton Breed To Come (1973)
- 07921 MY Cornell Woolrich The Bride Wore Black
- 08145 SF John Rankine The Bromius Phenomenon
- 08215 SF Fred Saberhagen Brother Assassin
- 08560 WE Tom West The Buzzard's Nest / Louis Trimble Siege at High Meadow (1973)
- 09022 SF Robert O'Riodan Cadre One
- 09037 SF Spider Robinson Callahan's Crosstime Saloon (1977)
- 09069 SF Spider Robinson Callahan's Crosstime Saloon
- 09072 SF Spider Robinson Callahan's Lady (1989)
- 09102 NA Nancy Buckingham Call of Glengarron
- 09128 SF Kenneth Von Gunden K-9 Corps
- 09135 WE Sam Bowie Canyon War / Clay Ringold The Hooded Gun (1969)
- 09200 SF Edgar Rice Burroughs Carson of Venus
- 09203 SF Edgar Rice Burroughs Carson of Venus
- 09205 SF Edgar Rice Burroughs Carson of Venus (1982)
- 09265 SF Andre Norton Catseye
- 09281 SF Edgar Rice Burroughs The Cave Girl
- 09284 SF Edgar Rice Burroughs The Cave Girl
- 10150 SF Walt Richmond Challenge the Hellmaker
- 10258 SF Margaret St. Clair Change the Sky and Other Stories (1974)
- 10293 SF Ken Bulmer The Chariots of Ra / John Rackham Earthstrings (July 1972)
- 10307 SF Ursula K. Le Guin City of Illusions (1967)
- 10410 SF A. E. van Vogt Children of Tomorrow
- 10411 SF A. E. van Vogt Children of Tomorrow
- 10471 NA Sam Bowie Chisum (1970)
- 10600 SF Robert A. Heinlein Citizen of the Galaxy
- 10621 SF Clifford D. Simak City
- 10665 WE Giles A. Lutz The Challenger / Tom West The Phantom Pistoleer (1960)
- 10701 SF Ursula K. Le Guin City of Illusions (1967)
- 10702 SF Ursula K. Le Guin City of Illusions
- 11036 SF Philip K. Dick Clans of the Alphane Moon (1972)
- 11182 SF Ron Goulart Clockwork Pirates / Ghost Breaker (March 1971)
- 11222 NA Nancy Buckingham Cloud Over Malverton
- 11451 SF A. Bertram Chandler Coils of Time / Into the Alternate Universe (November 1972)
- 11457 SF Robert E. Howard, L. Sprague de Camp, and Lin Carter Conan the Freebooter
- 11467 SF Robert E. Howard, Björn Nyberg, and L. Sprague de Camp Conan the Avenger (Conan #10)
- 11530 WE Dwight Bennett Newton (as Clement Hardin) Colt Wages / Louis Trimble The Lonesome Mountains (1970)
- 11546 SF Leigh Brackett The Coming of the Terrans (1976)
- 11555 SF A. Bertram Chandler The Commodore at Sea / Spartan Planet
- 11556 SF A. Bertram Chandler The Commodore at Sea / Spartan Planet (same cover as 11555-1)
- 11560 SF Suzette Haden Elgin The Communipaths / Louis Trimble The Noblest Experiment in the Galaxy (October 1970)
- 11603 SF Robert E. Howard (edited by L. Sprague de Camp) Conan the Conqueror (Conan #9)
- 11622 SF Anthony Boucher The Complete Werewolf & Other Stories of Fantasy & Science Fiction (1969)
- 11630 SF Robert E. Howard, L. Sprague de Camp, and Lin Carter Conan
- 11633 SF Robert E. Howard, L. Sprague de Camp, and Lin Carter Conan the Wanderer
- 11650 SF Mack Reynolds Computer War / Code Duello (February 1973)
- 11659 SF Andrew J. Offutt Conan the Mercenary (1981)
- 11669 SF L. Sprague de Camp (ed.) The Spell of Conan (1980)
- 11670 SF L. Sprague de Camp (ed.) The Blade of Conan (1979)
- 11671 SF Robert E. Howard, L. Sprague de Camp, and Lin Carter Conan (1967)
- 11672 SF Robert E. Howard, L. Sprague de Camp, and Lin Carter Conan of Cimmeria
- 11673 SF Robert Howard, L. Sprague de Camp, and Lin Carter Conan the Freebooter
- 11674 SF Robert E. Howard, L. Sprague de Camp, and Lin Carter Conan the Wanderer
- 11675 SF Robert E. Howard and L. Sprague de Camp Conan the Adventurer
- 11676 SF L. Sprague de Camp and Lin Carter Conan the Buccaneer
- 11677 SF Robert E. Howard and L. Sprague de Camp Conan the Warrior
- 11678 SF Robert E. Howard and L. Sprague de Camp Conan the Usurper
- 11679 SF Robert E. Howard (ed. L. Sprague de Camp) Conan the Conqueror
- 11680 SF Robert E. Howard, Björn Nyberg, and L. Sprague de Camp Conan the Avenger
- 11681 SF L. Sprague de Camp and Lin Carter Conan of the Isles
- 11682 SF L. Sprague de Camp and Lin Carter Conan of Aquilonia
- 11684 SF Andrew J. Offutt Conan and the Sorcerer (1979)
- 11705 SF Robert Silverberg Conquerors from the Darkness / Master of Life and Death
- 11738 WE Tom West Corral This Killer / Dan J. Stevens Hunter's Moon (1973)
- 11759 SF H. Beam Piper The Cosmic Computer
- 11785 WE Phillip Ketchum The Cougar Basin War / Louis Trimble Trouble Valley
- 11863 SF Robert E. Howard and L. Sprague de Camp Conan the Freebooter
- 12126 SF Philip K. Dick The Crack in Space (1966)
- 12140 SF Brian M. Stableford Cradle of the Sun / Ken Bulmer The Wizards of Senchuria (August 1969)
- 12311 SF Andre Norton The Crossroads of Time
- 12313 SF Andre Norton The Crossroads of Time (1978)
- 13245 SF Alan Dean Foster Cyber Way
- 13600 SF Margaret St. Clair The Dancers of Noyo (1973)
- 13612 SF Robert E. Howard and L. Sprague de Camp Conan the Freebooter
- 13681 NA Marie Garratt Dangerous Enchantment
- 13783 SF A. Bertram Chandler The Dark Dimensions / Alternate Orbits (May 1971)
- 13793 SF Dean R. Koontz Soft Come the Dragons / Dark of the Woods (November 1970)
- 13795 SF Andre Norton Dark Piper
- 13798 SF A. E. van Vogt The Darkness on Diamondia
- 13805 SF John Rackham Dark Planet / Nick Kamin The Herod Men (June 1971)
- 13898 SF Robert Silverberg and Randall Garrett (jointly as Robert Randall) The Dawning Light (1982)
- 13902 SF Barry N. Malzberg The Day of the Burning
- 13921 SF Thomas Burnett Swann Day of the Minotaur
- 13960 SF Mack Reynolds Day After Tomorrow
- 13972 SF Brian M. Stableford Days of Wrath
- 13994 SF Andre Norton Daybreak - 2250 A. D.
- 14000 SF Brian M. Stableford The Days of Glory
- 14153 MY Cornell Woolrich (as William Irish) Deadline at Dawn
- 14165 MY Jack Vance (as John Holbrook Vance) The Deadly Isles
- 14193 WE Nelson Nye Death Valley Slim / The Kid from Lincoln County
- 14194 WE Nelson Nye Death Valley Slim
- 14195 WE Merle Constiner Death Waits at Dakins Station / Kyle Hollingshead Ransome's Debt (1970)
- 14198 WE John Bickham Decker's Campaign
- 14215 SF Greg Benford Deeper Than the Darkness
- 14235 SF Andre Norton The Defiant Agents (1978)
- 14236 SF Andre Norton The Defiant Agents
- 14240 WE Wayne C. Lee Die-Hard
- 14244 SF James Schmitz The Demon Breed (1979)
- 14247 WE Edgar Rice Burroughs The Deputy Sheriff of Comanche County (1940)
- 14249 SF Andre Norton The Defiant Agents
- 14250 SF Mack Reynolds Depression Or Bust! / Dawnman Planet (October 1973)
- 14251 SF Poul Anderson, Mildred Downey Broxon, Michael Whelan, and Alicia Austin The Demon of Scattery (1979)
- 14256 NA Walter Scott Demonology & Witchcraft
- 14258 NA David Rome The Depraved (1968)
- 14265 WE Tom West Desperado Doublecross / Norman A. Daniels The Plunderers (1970)
- 14277 SF James Baen (ed.) Destinies Vol. 1, No. 3 (April – June, 1979)
- 14879 SF Timothy Powers Dinner at the Deviants Palace
- 14903 SF Frank Herbert Direct Descent
- 15238 SF George Warren Dominant Species
- 15670 SF Philip K. Dick Dr. Bloodmoney, Or How We Got Along After the Bomb (1976)
- 15697 SF Philip K. Dick Dr. Futurity / The Unteleported Man (September 1972)
- 15890 SF Marion Zimmer Bradley The Door Through Space / A. Bertram Chandler The Rim of Space (February 1972)
- 16600 SF Fred Saberhagen The Dracula Tape (1972)
- 16640 SF Jack Vance The Dragon Masters / 5 Gold Bands (April 1972)
- 16641 SF Jack Vance The Dragon Masters / The Last Castle (April 1973)
- 16647 SF Andre Norton Dragon Magic
- 16648 SF Jack Vance The Dragon Masters
- 16651 SF Jack Vance The Dragon-Masters
- 16668 SF John Brunner The Dramaturges of Yan
- 16669 SF Andre Norton Dread Companion (1970)
- 16670 SF Andre Norton Dread Companion (1970)
- 16701 SF Roger Zelazny The Dream Master
- 16728 SF Larry Niven and Steven Barnes Dream Park (1983)
- 17000 WE Dan J. Stevens The Dry Fork Incident / Reese Sullivan The Deadly Deputy (1969)
- 17235 WE Clay Ringold Duel in Lagrima Valley / Don P. Jenison South To New Range (1970)
- 17239 SF Ben Bova The Dueling Machine
- 17625 SF Frank Herbert Dune
- 17810 NA Jan Hoffman A Dying in the Night (1975)
- 18630 SF Gordon Eklund The Eclipse of Dawn (1970)
- 18770 SF Edgar Rice Burroughs Master of Adventure (1968)
- 19640 NA Eliot Asinof Eight Men Out (1963)
- 19681 SF Samuel R. Delany The Einstein Intersection
- 19710 SF Bob Shaw A Wreath of Stars
- 20275 SF Alan Garner Elidor
- 20556 SF H. Beam Piper Empire
- 20563 SF Fred Saberhagen Empire of the East
- 20565 SF Barrington J. Bayley Empire of Two Worlds
- 20571 SF Samuel R. Delany Empire Star / The Ballad of Beta-2 (November 1973)
- 20656 SF Keith Laumer End As a Hero (1985)
- 20660 SF Marion Zimmer Bradley Endless Universe (1975)
- 20661 SF Marion Zimmer Bradley Endless Universe (1979)
- 20664 SF Jerry Pournelle Endless Frontier, Volume I
- 20670 SF Judith Merril (ed.) England Swings SF: Stories of Speculative Fiction
- 20724 SF Poul Anderson Ensign Flandry (1979)
- 20730 SF Keith Laumer Envoy To New Worlds
- 21430 SF Mack Reynolds Equality in the Year 2000
- 21562 SF Edgar Rice Burroughs Escape on Venus
- 21567 SF Edgar Rice Burroughs Escape on Venus
- 21590 SF James White The Escape Orbit (1983)
- 21599 SF Christopher Stasheff Escape Velocity
- 21803 SF Edgar Rice Burroughs The Eternal Savage
- 21804 SF Edgar Rice Burroughs The Eternal Savage
- 21806 SF Edgar Rice Burroughs The Eternal Savage
- 21885 SF Jerry Pournelle Exiles to Glory (1977)
- 22215 SF Jerry Pournelle Exiles to Glory
- 22216 SF Jerry Pournelle Exiles to Glory
- 22327 NA Hans Holzer ESP and You
- 22365 SF Andre Norton Exiles of the Stars
- 22368 SF Andre Norton Exiles of the Stars
- 22374 SF Frank Herbert Eye
- 22375 SF Andre Norton Eye of the Monster
- 22386 SF Philip K. Dick Eye in the Sky (1975)
- 22387 SF Philip K. Dick Eye in the Sky (1980)
- 22388 SF Mike Connor Eye of the Sun (1988)
- 22500 SF Jack Vance The Faceless Man: Book One of the Durdane Trilogy
- 22576 SF Marion Zimmer Bradley Falcons of Narabedla / The Dark Intruder & Other Stories (December 1972)
- 22577 SF Marion Zimmer Bradley Falcons of Narabedla (1979)
- 22600 SF Dean R. Koontz The Fall of the Dream Machine / Kenneth Bulmer The Star Venturers (January 1969)
- 22640 SF Samuel R. Delany The Fall of the Towers
- 22680 NA Hershatter Fallout for a Spy
- 22690 SF Barry N. Malzberg The Falling Astronauts (1971)
- 22742 NA Margaret Erskine The Family at Tammerton
- 22811 SF A. E. van Vogt The Far-Out Worlds of Van Vogt (1968)
- 22812 SF A. E. van Vogt The Worlds of A. E. van Vogt
- 22819 SF Edmund Cooper A Far Sunset
- 22830 SF D. G. Compton Farewell, Earth's Bliss
- 23140 SF Dean R. Koontz Fear That Man / E. C. Tubb Toyman (May 1969)
- 23189 SF H. Beam Piper Federation (1982)
- 23419 SF H. Beam Piper (ed. Michael Kurland) First Cycle (1982)
- 23775 SF Barry N. Malzberg (as K.M. O'Donnell) Final War and Other Fantasies / John Rackham Treasure of Tau Ceti (October 1969)
- 23929 SF Dennis Schmidt Twilight of the Gods: The First Name
- 23998 SF Shariann Lewitt First and Final Rites
- 24035 SF Mack Reynolds The Five Way Secret Agent and Mercenary from Tomorrow
- 24100 SF John Rackham Flower of Doradi / Jeremy Strike A Promising Planet (May 1970)
- 24302 NA W. Johnston The Underground Picnic: The Flying Nun#5 (1970)
- 24415 NA John Michell The Flying Saucer Vision (1967)
- 24590 SF R. A. Lafferty Fourth Mansions (1969)
- 24800 SF Jules Verne For the Flag (1961)
- 24806 SF David C. Smith and Richard Tierney For the Witch of the Mists (1981)
- 24890 SF H. Beam Piper Four-Day Planet / Lone Star Planet
- 24892 SF H. Beam Piper Four-Day Planet / H. Beam Piper and John J. McGuire Lone Star Planet
- 24903 SF Roger Zelazny Four For Tomorrow
- 24925 WE Merle Constiner The Fourth Gunman / Tom West Slick on the Draw
- 24975 NA Jack Vance (as John Holbrook Vance) The Fox Valley Murders (1968)
- 25165 NA Michael Hervey Fraternity of the Weird (1969)
- 25300 NA Georgette Heyer Friday's Child (1946)
- 25306 SF Arsen Darnay A Hostage For Hinterland (1976)
- 25460 SF Mary Staton From the Legend of Biel
- 25461 SF Mary Staton From the Legend of Biel
- 25950 SF Suzette Haden Elgin Furthest (1971)
- 25980 SF A. E. van Vogt Future Glitter (1973)
- 26176 SF H. Beam Piper Fuzzies and Other People
- 26181 SF William Tuning Fuzzy Bones
- 26192 SF H. Beam Piper Fuzzy Sapiens
- 26194 SF H. Beam Piper The Fuzzy Papers
- 26196 SF H. Beam Piper Fuzzy Sapiens
- 27226 SF Andre Norton Galactic Derelict
- 27228 SF Andre Norton Galactic Derelict
- 27229 SF Andre Norton Galactic Derelict (1978)
- 27232 SF Jack Vance Galactic Effectuator (1981)
- 27235 SF Walt Richmond and Leigh Richmond Gallaghers Glacier / Positive Charge (April 1970)
- 27240 SF Mack Reynolds Galactic Medal of Honor
- 27251 WE Barry Cord Gallows Ghost / The Long Wire (1967)
- 27310 SF Philip K. Dick The Game-Players of Titan (1972)
- 27346 SF Philip K. Dick and Ray Nelson The Ganymede Takeover (1977)
- 27376 WE Tom West Gallows Gulch / The Man at Rope's End (1964)
- 27389 SF Philip José Farmer The Gates of Creation (1981)
- 27400 SF Neal Barrett, Jr. The Gates of Time / Barry N. Malzberg (as K.M. O'Donnell) Dwellers of the Deep (December 1970)
- 27415 SF Barry N. Malzberg (as "K.M. O'Donnell") Gather in the Hall of Planets / In the Pocket and Other S-F Stories (September 1971)
- 27419 SF Edmund Cooper A Far Sunset (1977)
- 27501 SF Samuel R. Delany The Fall of the Towers
- 27910 SF Howard Fast The General Zapped An Angel
- 28702 SF James P. Blaylock The Stone Giant (1989)
- 28911 NA Edgar Rice Burroughs The Girl from Hollywood
- 28914 NA Michael Avallone The Girls in Television (1974)
- 29350 NA Harlan Ellison The Glass Teat (1970)
- 29400 SF L. Sprague de Camp The Glory That Was (1979)
- 29525 SF Robert E. Howard The Gods of Bal-Sagoth
- 29741 NA Todhunter Ballard Gold in California (1965)
- 29743 NA Todhunter Ballard Gold in California (1965)
- 29786 NA Peter Bourne The Golden Pagans
- 30261 SF Frank Herbert The Green Brain
- 30262 SF Frank Herbert The Green Brain
- 30263 SF Frank Herbert The Green Brain
- 30274 SF Lucius Shepard Green Eyes (1984)
- 30295 SF Charles de Lint Greenmantle (1988)
- 30300 SF Fritz Leiber The Green Millennium / Night Monsters (March 1969)
- 30301 SF Fritz Leiber The Green Millennium
- 30590 SF Louis Trimble and Jacquelyn Trimble Guardians of the Gate
- 30600 SF Edwin L. Arnold Gulliver of Mars (1905)
- 30701 WE Nelson Nye Rogue's Rendezvous / Gun Feud at Tiedown (1965)
- 30710 WE Giles A. Lutz Gun Rich
- 30850 WE Tom West Black Buzzards of Bueno / Ben Smith The Guns of Sonora (1969)
- 31557 SF Andre Norton The X Factor
- 31590 SF Leigh Brackett The Halfling and Other Stories (1973)
- 31725 NA Shirley Jackson Hangsaman
- 31739 WE Edwin Booth Hardesty / Reese Sullivan The Stranger (1972)
- 31755 SF A. Bertram Chandler The Hard Way Up / Robert Lory The Veiled World (October 1972)
- 31781 NA Leal Hayes Harlequin House
- 31800 SF Robert A. Heinlein Have Space Suit - Will Travel
- 31801 SF Robert A. Heinlein Have Space Suit - Will Travel
- 31930 NA Jane Blackmore Hawkridge (1976)
- 31940 NA John Swenson Headliners: Kiss: The Greatest Rock Show on Earth! (1978)
- 31941 NA Charley Walters Headliners: Fleetwood Mac (1979)
- 31986 SF David Drake Hammer's Slammers
- 32725 WE Nelson Nye Hellbound For Ballarat (1970)
- 32335 NA Anonymous The Young Rebels: The Hedgerow Incident (1970)
- 32575 NA Charles O. Locke The Hell Bent Kid
- 32718 WE Barry Cord Hell in Paradise Valley / Clay Ringold The Night Hell's Corners Died
- 32800 SF Frank Herbert Heretics of Dune (1987)
- 33460 WE Louis Trimble Wild Horse Range / William O. Turner The High Hander (1963)
- 33700 SF Andre Norton High Sorcery
- 33701 SF Andre Norton High Sorcery (1970)
- 33704 SF Andre Norton High Sorcery
- 33710 SF Neal Barrett Jr. Highwood / Barrington Bayley Annihilation Factor (January 1972)
- 34245 SF Fred Saberhagen The Holmes-Dracula File (1978)
- 34250 NA N. Fredrik Hollywood and the Academy Awards (1970)
- 34260 NA Mair Unsworth Home to My Love (1973)
- 34345 SF Orson Scott Card Hot Sleep: The Worthing Chronicle
- 34361 NA Nancy Buckingham The Hour Before Moonrise
- 34440 NA Barbara Lane Housewife Hookers (1973)
- 34441 NA Barbara Lane Housewife Hookers, Part II (1974)
- 34458 SF Glenn Lord (ed.) The Howard Collector
- 34900 SF Bruce Mcallister Humanity Prime
- 35241 SF Andre Norton Huon of the Horn
- 35804 SF Edgar Rice Burroughs I Am a Barbarian
- 35805 SF Edgar Rice Burroughs I Am a Barbarian (1978)
- 35840 SF Andre Norton Ice Crown (1970)
- 35843 SF Andre Norton Ice Crown
- 35844 SF Andre Norton Ice Crown (1993)
- 35854 SF Kim Stanley Robinson Icehenge (1984)
- 36300 NA Ron Goulart If Dying Was All (1971)
- 37062 SF A. Bertram Chandler The Inheritors / The Gateway to Never (June 1972)
- 37063 SF A. Bertram Chandler The Inheritors / The Gateway to Never
- 37064 SF A. Bertram Chandler The Inheritors / The Gateway to Never
- 37088 SF Walt Richmond The Probability Corner
- 37090 SF Mark Adlard Interface (1971)
- 37100 SF Arthur K. Barnes Interplanetary Hunter (1972)
- 37106 SF Brian M. Stableford In the Kingdom of the Beasts
- 37108 SF A. Bertram Chandler Into the Alternate Universe / Contraband from Otherspace
- 37109 SF A. Bertram Chandler Into the Alternate Universe / Contraband from Otherspace
- 37130 SF Robert Silverberg Invaders from Earth / To Worlds Beyond
- 37217 SF Colin Kapp The Ion War (1978)
- 37250 SF Marion Zimmer Bradley The Brass Dragon / John Rackham Ipomoea (April 1969)
- 37291 SF Andre Norton Iron Cage (1974)
- 37292 SF Andre Norton Iron Cage (1981)
- 37365 SF Robert E. Howard The Iron Man / The Adventures of Dennis Dorgan
- 37381 NA P. Agan Is That Who I Think It Is? Volume 1 (1975)
- 37382 NA P. Agan Is That Who I Think It Is? Volume 3 (1976)
- 37421 NA H. G. Wells The Island of Dr. Moreau (1977)
- 37425 SF Avram Davidson An Island Under the Earth (1969)
- 37465 SF Roger Zelazny Isle of the Dead (1969)
- 37466 SF Roger Zelazny Isle of the Dead (1974)
- 37468 SF Roger Zelazny Isle of the Dead (1976)
- 37470 SF Roger Zelazny Isle of the Dead (1982)
- 37598 NA Gil Brewer The Devil in Davos: It Takes a Thief#1 (1969)
- 37599 NA Gil Brewer Mediterranean Caper: It Takes a Thief#2 (1969)
- 37600 NA Gil Brewer Appointment in Cairo: It Takes a Thief#3 (1970)
- 37797 SF Esther Friesner Here Be Demons
- 38120 SF John Brunner The Jagged Orbit (1969)
- 38122 SF John Brunner The Jagged Orbit
- 38287 SF Jerry Pournelle The Janissaries
- 38500 WE Kyle Hollingshead Ransome's Move / L. L. Foreman Jemez Brand (1971)
- 38536 SF E. C. Tubb The Jester at Scar: Dumarest of Terra#5 (1982)
- 38570 SF C. L. Moore Jirel of Joiry
- 40590 NA Ron Goulart Too Sweet to Die (1972)
- 40850 SF Robert Sheckley The Journey of Joenes
- 41550 NA Jerry Bladwin Kept Man (1975)
- 41550 SF Andre Norton Judgement on Janus
- 41551 SF Andre Norton Judgement on Janus
- 41841 NA William Burroughs Junkie (1964)
- 42800 SF E. C. Tubb Kalin/ Alex Dain The Bane of Kanthos (September 1969)
- 42801 SF E. C. Tubb Kalin
- 42900 SF Lin Carter Tower of the Medusa / George H. Smith Kar Kaballa (November 1969)
- 43525 SF Dennis Schmidt Kensho
- 43672 SF Andre Norton A Key Out of Time (1978)
- 43679 SF Andre Norton A Key Out of Time
- 44470 SF Edgar Wallace and Merian C. Cooper King Kong (1976)
- 44485 SF Christopher Stasheff King Kobold
- 44489 SF Christopher Stasheff King Kobold Revived
- 44512 NA Bernhardt Hurwood Kingdom of the Spiders (1977)
- 45000 SF Andre Norton Knave of Dreams (1976)
- 45001 SF Andre Norton Knave of Dreams
- 46272 SF Edgar Rice Burroughs The Lad and the Lion (1978)
- 46850 SF Thomas Burnett Swann Lady of the Bees
- 46996 SF Edgar Rice Burroughs Land of Terror
- 46997 SF Edgar Rice Burroughs Land of Terror
- 47000 SF Edgar Rice Burroughs Land of Terror
- 47013 SF Edgar Rice Burroughs The Land of Hidden Men
- 47020 SF Edgar Rice Burroughs The Land That Time Forgot
- 47022 SF Edgar Rice Burroughs The Land That Time Forgot
- 47023 SF Edgar Rice Burroughs The Land That Time Forgot
- 47026 SF Edgar Rice Burroughs The Land That Time Forgot
- 47042 SF Jack Vance The Languages of Pao
- 47161 SF Andre Norton The Last Planet
- 47162 SF Andre Norton The Last Planet (1972)
- 47200 WE L. L. Foreman Last Stand Mesa / Phillip Ketchum Mad Morgan's Hoard (1969)
- 47440 SF Andre Norton Lavender-Green Magic (1977)
- 47800 SF Ursula K. Le Guin The Left Hand of Darkness (1969)
- 47805 SF Ursula K. Le Guin The Left Hand of Darkness (1976)
- 48245 SF John T. Phillifent Life With Lancelot / William Barton Hunting on Kunderer (August 1973)
- 48494 SF H. Beam Piper Little Fuzzy
- 48520 SF Fred Saberhagen The Berserker Wars
- 48755 WE Tom West Lobo of Lynx Valley / Louis Trimble The Ragbag Army (1971)
- 48862 NA Charles Fort Lo!
- 48877 WE Giles A. Lutz The Lonely Ride
- 48885 WE Brian Garfield (as Brian Wynne) Gunslick Territory / John Callahan Loner With a Gun (1973)
- 48918 WE Nelson Nye Long Run
- 48970 SF Mack Reynolds Looking Backward, from the Year 2000 (1973)
- 49051 SF H. Beam Piper Lord Kalvan of Otherwhen
- 49236 SF Andre Norton Lord of Thunder
- 49252 SF Philip José Farmer Lord of the Trees / The Mad Goblin (May 1970)
- 49294 SF Edgar Rice Burroughs The Lost Continent
- 49301 WE Lin Searles Saddle in the Wind / Tom West Lost Loot of Kittycat Ranch (1965)
- 49501 SF Edgar Rice Burroughs Lost on Venus
- 49504 SF Edgar Rice Burroughs Lost on Venus
- 49506 SF Edgar Rice Burroughs Lost on Venus
- 49507 SF Edgar Rice Burroughs Lost on Venus
- 49548 SF Fred Saberhagen Love Conquers All
- 49851 SF Allen Steele Orbital Decay
- 50485 SF Allen Steele Lunar Descent
- 50531 SF Jack Vance Madouc
- 51356 SF Steve Perry The Machiavelli Interface (1986)
- 51375 SF Philip José Farmer The Mad Goblins / Philip José Farmer Lord of the Trees (September 1970)
- 51388 SF Michael Moorcock The Mad God's Amulet
- 51401 SF Edgar Rice Burroughs The Mad King
- 51402 SF Edgar Rice Burroughs The Mad King
- 51403 SF Edgar Rice Burroughs The Mad King
- 51404 SF Edgar Rice Burroughs The Mad King
- 51409 SF Edgar Rice Burroughs The Mad King
- 51544 SF Larry Niven The Magic Goes Away (1978)
- 51550 NA Adeline McElfresh The Magic of Dr. Farrar (1965)
- 51590 SF John Eric Holmes Mahars of Pellucidar
- 51624 SF Philip José Farmer The Maker of Universes
- 51626 NA Rachel Cosgrove Payes Malverne Hall (1970)
- 51642 WE Ray Hogan The Man from Barranca Negra
- 51647 SF Brian Aldiss The Malacia Tapestry (1976)
- 51700 NA David McDaniel The Hollow Crown Affair (1969)
- 51701 NA Peter Leslie The Unfair Fare Affair (1968)
- 51702 NA John T. Phillifent The Power Cube Affair
- 51702 SF Edgar Rice Burroughs The Mad King
- 51703 NA John T. Phillifent The Corfu Affair (1967)
- 51704 NA Joel Bernard The Thinking Machine Affair (1967)
- 51705 NA John Oram Thomas (as John Oram) The Stone-Cold Dead in the Market Affair
- 51706 NA Peter Leslie The Finger in the Spy Affair (1966)
- 51910 SF Philip K. Dick The Man Who Japed (1975)
- 51918 SF Steve Perry The Man Who Never Missed (1986)
- 51941 NA Bruce Cassiday The Fire's Center; Marcus Welby#3 (1971)
- 51943 SF David Alexander Smith Marathon
- 52035 WE Eric Allen Marshall From Whiskey Smith / Gene Tuttle Imposters in Mesquite
- 52075 SF Henry Kuttner, Bob Pepper, and Alicia Austin The Mask of Circe (1971)
- 52077 SF Fred Saberhagen The Mask of the Sun
- 52078 SF Fred Saberhagen The Mask of the Sun
- 52110 NA Jennifer Sills Massage Parlor (1973)
- 52180 SF Robert Lory A Harvest of Hoodwinks / Masters of the Lamp (July 1970)
- 52207 SF Steve Perry Matadora (1986)
- 52400 SF John Brunner Meeting at Infinity
- 52470 SF Donald A. Wollheim (ed.) Men on the Moon
- 52560 SF Alan E. Nourse The Mercy Men
- 52740 WE L.P. Homes The Maverick Star (1969)
- 52975 SF Gerard F. Conway The Midnight Dancers
- 53151 SF John W. Campbell The Mightiest Machine
- 53167 SF Algis Budrys, Charles G. Waugh, and Martin Harry Greenberg (eds.) Space Dogfights (1992)
- 53183 SF John Varley Millennium
- 53299 SF Spider Robinson Mindkiller
- 53355 SF Ian Watson Miracle Visitors
- 53415 SF John T. Phillifent Hierarchies / Doris Piserchia Mister Justice (May 1973)
- 53503 SF Andrew J. Offutt The Mists of Doom
- 53540 SF George Zebrowski The Monadic Universe
- 53540 WE William E. Vance The Wolf Slayer / Brian Garfield (as Brian Wynne) Mr. Sixgun (1954)
- 53570 SF D. G. Compton The Missionaries (1972)
- 53587 SF Edgar Rice Burroughs The Monster Men
- 53588 SF Edgar Rice Burroughs The Monster Men
- 53591 SF Edgar Rice Burroughs The Monster Men
- 53701 SF Edgar Rice Burroughs The Moon Maid
- 53702 SF Edgar Rice Burroughs The Moon Maid
- 53703 SF Edgar Rice Burroughs The Moon Maid
- 53705 SF Edgar Rice Burroughs The Moon Maid
- 53719 SF Charles de Lint Moonheart (1984)
- 53753 SF Edgar Rice Burroughs The Moon Men
- 53756 SF Edgar Rice Burroughs The Moon Men
- 53780 SF John W. Campbell The Moon is Hell
- 54101 SF Andre Norton Moon of 3 Rings
- 54103 SF Andre Norton Moon of 3 Rings
- 54104 SF Andre Norton Moon of 3 Rings (July 1978)
- 54105 SF Andre Norton Moon of 3 Rings (May 1981)
- 54201 SF Thomas Burnett Swann Moondust
- 54325 NA Rona Randall Mountain of Fear (1971)
- 54378 NA Virginia Coffman Moura (1963)
- 54380 NA Virginia Coffman Moura (1963)
- 54460 NA Edgar Rice Burroughs The Mucker (1974)
- 54462 SF Edgar Rice Burroughs The Mucker (1914)
- 54484 SF Charles de Lint Mulengro: A Romany Tale (1985)
- 54500 SF Mark Adlard Multiface (1975)
- 55145 SF Fritz Leiber You're All Alone (1973)
- 55309 SF Fred Saberhagen The Mask of the Sun
- 56010 SF Gordon R. Dickson Naked to the Stars
- 56940 SF Leigh Brackett The Nemesis from Terra (1976)
- 57140 WE Ray Hogan New Gun For Kingdom City / The Shotgunner
- 57601 WE Reese Sullivan Nemesis of Circle A / Brian Garfield (as Brian Wynne) The Night It Rained Bullets (1965)
- 57751SF Andre Norton Night of Masks
- 57752 SF Andre Norton Night of Masks
- 57975 NA Margaret Summerton Nightingale at Noon
- 58024 SF Mark E. Rogers The Nightmare of God (1988)
- 58050 SF R. A. Lafferty Nine Hundred Grandmothers (1970)
- 58601 WE Merle Constiner Two Pistols South of Deadwood / William Vance No Man's Brand
- 58875 NA Jesse Kornbluth Notes from the New Underground (1968)
- 58880 SF Sam Lundwall Alice's World / No Time For Heroes (January 1971)
- 60563 SF Edgar Rice Burroughs The Oakdale Affair
- 60564 SF Edgar Rice Burroughs The Oakdale Affair
- 60739 SF Fred Saberhagen Octagon (1981)
- 60990 WE Reese Sullivan Man on the Run / John Callahan Odds Against the Texan (1971)
- 61480 NA The Editors of Science & Mechanics (compilers) The Official Guide to UFO's (1968)
- 62160 SF Fred Saberhagen Old Friend of the Family (1979)
- 62380 SF George Zebrowski The Omega Point
- 62938 SF Bob Shaw One Million Tomorrows
- 63165 SF Kenneth Bulmer On the Symb-Socket Circuit (1972)
- 63410 SF Andre Norton Operation Time Search
- 63590 SF John Rankine Operation Umanaq (1973)
- 63780 SF Bob Shaw Orbitsville
- 64146 SF John Dechancie Paradox Alley (1987)
- 64240 SF Bob Shaw Other Days, Other Eyes
- 64400 SF Philip K. Dick Our Friends from Frolix 8 (1970)
- 64401 SF Philip K. Dick Our Friends from Frolix 8 (1977)
- 64484 SF Edgar Rice Burroughs Out of Times Abyss
- 64512 NA Edgar Rice Burroughs The Outlaw of Torn
- 64514 SF Edgar Rice Burroughs The Outlaw of Torn
- 65050 SF Bob Shaw The Palace of Eternity
- 65125 SF Jack Williamson The Pandora Effect (1969)
- 65169 SF H. Beam Piper Paratime (1981)
- 65316 SF Larry Niven The Patchwork Girl (1981)
- 65353 SF Fred Saberhagen Octagon
- 65390 SF Colin Kapp Patterns of Chaos (1978)
- 65412 SF Edgar Rice Burroughs The Outlaw of Torn (1973)
- 65430 SF Keith Roberts Pavane (1966)
- 65442 NA Anne Maybury The Pavilion at Monkshood (1973)
- 65852 SF Edgar Rice Burroughs Pellucidar
- 65855 SF Edgar Rice Burroughs Pellucidar
- 65873 NA Eliot Asinof People vs. Blutcher (1971)
- 65874 SF Robert Sheckley The People Trap / Mindswap
- 65890 SF Jack Williamson People Machines
- 65941 SF Edgar Rice Burroughs The People That Time Forgot
- 65942 SF Edgar Rice Burroughs The People That Time Forgot
- 65946 SF Edgar Rice Burroughs The People That Time Forgot
- 65948 SF Mack Reynolds Perchance to Dream
- 65970 SF K.H. Scheer & Walter Ernsting Perry Rhodan 1: Enterprise Stardust (1969)
- 65971 SF K.H. Scheer & Walter Ernsting Perry Rhodan 2: The Radiant Dome (1969)
- 65972 SF K.H. Scheer & W.W. Shols Perry Rhodan 3: Galactic Alarm (1969)
- 65973 SF Walter Ernsting & Kurt Mahr Perry Rhodan 4: Invasion from Space (1969)
- 65974 SF K.H. Scheer & Kurt Mahr Perry Rhodan 5: The Vega Sector (1970)
- 65975 SF Clark Darlton Perry Rhodan 6: The Secret of the Time Vault (1971)
- 65976 SF K.H. Scheer Perry Rhodan 7: Fortress of the Six Moons (1971)
- 65977 SF Clark Darlton Perry Rhodan 8: The Galactic Riddle (1971)
- 65978 SF Clark Darlton Perry Rhodan 9: Quest thru Time and Space (1971)
- 65979 SF Kurt Mahr Perry Rhodan 10: The Ghosts of Gol (1971)
- 65980 SF Kurt Mahr Perry Rhodan 11: The Planet of the Dying Sun (1972)
- 65981 SF Clark Darlton Perry Rhodan 12: The Rebels of Tuglan (1972)
- 65982 SF K.H. Scheer Perry Rhodan 13: The Immortal Unknown (1972)
- 65983 SF Kurt Mahr Perry Rhodan 14: Venus in Danger (1972)
- 65984 SF Clark Darlton Perry Rhodan 15: Escape to Venus (1972)
- 65986 SF W.W. Shols Perry Rhodan 16: Secret Barrier X (1972)
- 65987 SF Kurt Mahr Perry Rhodan 17: The Venus Trap (1972)
- 66988 SF Kurt Mahr Perry Rhodan 18: Menace of the Mutant Master (1972)
- 66990 SF Clark Darlton Perry Rhodan 19: Mutants vs. Mutants (1972)
- 65991 SF Clark Darlton Perry Rhodan 20: The Thrall of Hypno (1972)
- 65993 SF K.H. Scheer & Walter Ernsting Perry Rhodan 1: Enterprise Stardust (1972) (second printing)
- 65994 SF K.H. Scheer & Walter Ernsting Perry Rhodan 2: The Radiant Dome (1972) (second printing)
- 65995 SF K.H. Scheer & W.W. Shols Perry Rhodan 3: Galactic Alarm (1972) (second printing)
- 65996 SF Walter Ernsting & Kurt Mahr Perry Rhodan 4: Invasion from Space (1972) (second printing)
- 65997 SF K.H. Scheer & Kurt Mahr Perry Rhodan 5: The Vega Sector (1972) (second printing)
- 65998 SF Clark Darlton Perry Rhodan 6: The Secret of the Time Vault (second printing)
- 65999 SF K.H. Scheer Perry Rhodan 7: Fortress of the Six Moons (second printing)
- 66004 SF K.H. Scheer Perry Rhodan 21: The Cosmic Traitor (1973)
- 66005 SF Kurt Mahr Perry Rhodan 22: The Fleet of the Springers (1973)
- 66006 SF Kurt Mahr Perry Rhodan 23: Peril on Ice Planet (1973)
- 66007 SF Clark Darlton Perry Rhodan 24: Infinity Flight (1973)
- 66008 SF Clark Darlton Perry Rhodan 25: Snowman in Flames (1973)
- 66009 SF Kurt Brand Perry Rhodan 26: Cosmic Traitor (1973)
- 66010 SF Kurt Mahr Perry Rhodan 28: The Plague of Oblivion (1973)
- 66011 SF Clark Darlton Perry Rhodan 27: Planet of the Gods (1973)
- 66012 SF Clark Darlton Perry Rhodan 29: A World Gone Mad (1973)
- 66013 SF Kurt Mahr Perry Rhodan 30: To Arkon! (1973)
- 66014 SF K.H. Scheer Perry Rhodan 31: Realm of the Tri-Planets (1973)
- 66015 SF Clark Darlton Perry Rhodan 32: Challenge of the Unknown (1973)
- 66016 SF Clark Darlton Perry Rhodan 33: The Giant's Partner (1973)
- 66017 SF Kurt Brand Perry Rhodan 34: SOS: Spaceship Titan! (1973)
- 66018 SF Kurt Mahr Perry Rhodan 35: Beware The Microbots (1973)
- 66019 SF K.H. Scheer Perry Rhodan 36: Man and Monster (1973)
- 66020 SF Clark Darlton Perry Rhodan 37: Epidemic Center: Aralon (1974)
- 66021 SF Kurt Brand Perry Rhodan 38: Project: Earthsave (1974)
- 66022 SF Kurt Mahr Perry Rhodan 39: The Silence of Gom (1974)
- 66023 SF Clark Darlton Perry Rhodan 40: Red Eye of Betelgeuse (1974)
- 66024 SF Clark Darlton Perry Rhodan 41: The Earth Dies (1974)
- 66025 SF K.H. Scheer Perry Rhodan 42: Time's Lonely One (1974)
- 66026 SF Kurt Brand Perry Rhodan 43: Life Hunt (1974)
- 66027 SF Clark Darlton Perry Rhodan 44: The Pseudo One (1974)
- 66028 SF Kurt Mahr Perry Rhodan 45: Unknown Sector: Milky Way (1974)
- 66029 SF K.H. Scheer Perry Rhodan 46: Again: Atlan! (1974)
- 66030 SF Kurt Brand Perry Rhodan 47: Shadow of the Mutant Master (1974)
- 66031 SF Clark Darlton Perry Rhodan 48: The Dead Live (1974)
- 66032 SF Kurt Mahr Perry Rhodan 49: Solar Assassins (1974)
- 66033 SF Clark Darlton Perry Rhodan 50: Attack from the Unseen (1974)
- 66034 SF Kurt Mahr Perry Rhodan 51: Return from the Void (1974)
- 66035 SF K.H. Scheer Perry Rhodan 52: Fortress Atlantis (1974)
- 66036 SF Clark Darlton Perry Rhodan 53: Spybot! (1974)
- 66037 SF Kurt Mahr Perry Rhodan 54: The Blue Dwarfs (1974)
- 66038 SF Clark Darlton Perry Rhodan 55: The Micro-Techs (1974)
- 66039 SF Clark Darlton Perry Rhodan 56: Prisoner of Time (1974)
- 66040 SF Clark Darlton Perry Rhodan 57: A Touch of Eternity (1974)
- 66041 SF Kurt Mahr Perry Rhodan 58: The Guardians (1974)
- 66042 SF Kurt Brand Perry Rhodan 59: Interlude on Siliko 5 (1974)
- 66043 SF Kurt Mahr Perry Rhodan 60: Dimension Search (1974)
- 66044 SF Kurt Mahr Perry Rhodan 61: Death Waits in Semispace (1975)
- 66045 SF K.H. Scheer Perry Rhodan 62: The Last Days of Atlantis (1975)
- 66046 SF Kurt Brand Perry Rhodan 63: The Tigris Leaps (1975)
- 66047 SF Kurt Mahr Perry Rhodan 64: The Ambassadors from Aurigel (1975)
- 66048 SF Kurt Mahr Perry Rhodan 65: Renegades of the Future (1975)
- 66049 SF William Voltz Perry Rhodan 66: The Horror (1975)
- 66050 NA Cornell Woolrich Phantom Lady
- 66051 SF K.H. Scheer Perry Rhodan 67: Crimson Universe (1975)
- 66052 SF Clark Darlton Perry Rhodan 68: Under the Stars of Druufon (1975)
- 66053 SF Clark Darlton Perry Rhodan 69: The Bonds of Eternity (1975)
- 66054 SF Kurt Brand Perry Rhodan 70: Thora's Sacrifice (1975)
- 66055 SF Kurt Mahr Perry Rhodan 71: The Atom Hell of Grautier (1975)
- 66056 SF Kurt Mahr Perry Rhodan 72: Caves of the Druufs (1975)
- 66057 SF Clark Darlton Perry Rhodan 73: Spaceship of Ancestors (1975)
- 66058 SF Kurt Mahr Perry Rhodan 74: Checkmate: Universe (1975)
- 66059 SF Kurt Brand Perry Rhodan 75: Planet Topide, Please Reply! (1975)
- 66060 SF Clark Darlton Perry Rhodan 76: Recruits for Arkon (1975)
- 66061 SF Clark Darlton Perry Rhodan 77: Conflict Center: Naator (1975)
- 66062 SF K.H. Scheer Perry Rhodan 78: Power Key (1975)
- 66063 SF William Voltz Perry Rhodan 79: The Sleepers (1975)
- 66064 SF K.H. Scheer Perry Rhodan 80: The Columbus Affair (1975)
- 66065 SF Kurt Brand Perry Rhodan 81: Pucky's Greatest Hour (1975)
- 66066 SF Kurt Brand Perry Rhodan 82: Atlan in Danger (1975)
- 66067 SF Clark Darlton Perry Rhodan 83: Ernst Ellert Returns! (1975)
- 66068 SF William Voltz Perry Rhodan 84: Secret Mission: Moluk (1975)
- 66069 SF Kurt Mahr Perry Rhodan 85: Enemy in the Dark (1975)
- 66070 SF Clark Darlton Perry Rhodan 86: Blazing Sun (1976)
- 66071 SF Clark Darlton Perry Rhodan 87: The Starless Realm (1976)
- 66072 SF K.H. Scheer Perry Rhodan 88: The Mystery of the Anti (1976)
- 66073 SF Kurt Brand Perry Rhodan 89: Power's Price (1976)
- 66074 SF Kurt Brand Perry Rhodan 90: Unleashed Powers (1976)
- 66075 SF William Voltz Perry Rhodan 91: Friend to Mankind (1976)
- 66076 SF K.H. Scheer Perry Rhodan 92: The Target Star (1976)
- 66077 SF Clark Darlton Perry Rhodan 93: Vagabond of Space (1976)
- 66078 SF Kurt Mahr Perry Rhodan 94: Action: Division 3 (1976)
- 66079 SF Kurt Mahr Perry Rhodan 95: The Plasma Monster (1976)
- 66080 SF William Voltz Perry Rhodan 96: Horn: Green (1976)
- 66081 SF Clark Darlton Perry Rhodan 97: Phantom Fleet (1976)
- 66082 SF Kurt Mahr Perry Rhodan 98: The Idol from Passa (1976)
- 66083 SF K.H. Scheer Perry Rhodan 99: The Blue System (1976)
- 66084 SF Kurt Mahr Perry Rhodan 100: Desert of Death's Domain (1976)
- 66085 SF Kurt Brand Perry Rhodan 101: Blockade: Lepso (1976)
- 66086 SF William Voltz Perry Rhodan 102: Spoor of the Antis (1976)
- 66087 SF Clark Darlton Perry Rhodan 103: False Front (1976)
- 66088 SF Kurt Brand Perry Rhodan 104: The Man with Two Faces (1976)
- 66089 SF Kurt Mahr Perry Rhodan 105: Wonderflower of Utik (1976)
- 66090 SF Kurt Brand Perry Rhodan 106: Caller from Eternity (1976)
- 66091 SF William Voltz Perry Rhodan 107: The Emperor & The Monster (1977)
- 66092 SF K.H. Scheer Perry Rhodan 108: Duel Under the Double Sun (1977)
- 66093 SF Clark Darlton Perry Rhodan 109: The Stolen Spacefleet / Kurt Mahr Perry Rhodan 110: Sgt. Robot (1977)
- 66094 SF William Voltz Perry Rhodan 111: Seeds of Ruin / K. H. Scheer Perry Rhodan 112: Planet Mechanica (1977)
- 66095 SF Clark Darlton Perry Rhodan 113: Heritage of the Lizard People / Kurt Mahr Perry Rhodan 114: Death's Demand (1977)
- 66096 SF Kurt Brand Perry Rhodan 115: Saboteurs in A-1 / William Voltz Perry Rhodan 116: The Psycho Duel (1977)
- 66097 SF K.H. Scheer Perry Rhodan 117: Savior of the Empire / Clark Darlton Perry Rhodan 118: The Shadows Attack (1977)
- 66098 SF W.W. Shols Perry Rhodan: The Wasp Men Attack / Ernest Vlcek Atlan #1: Spider Desert (1977)
- 66099 SF Kurt Mahr Perry Rhodan: Menace of Atomigeddon / Clark Darlton Atlan #2: Flight from Tarkihl
- 66100 SF Avram Davidson The Phoenix and the Mirror
- 66101 SF K.H. Scheer & Walter Ernsting Perry Rhodan 1: Enterprise Stardust (1974) (third printing)
- 66102 SF K.H. Scheer & Walter Ernsting Perry Rhodan 2: The Radiant Dome (1974) (third printing)
- 66103 SF K.H. Scheer & W.W. Shols Perry Rhodan 3: Galactic Alarm (1974) (third printing)
- 66104 SF Walter Ernsting & Kurt Mahr Perry Rhodan 4: Invasion from Space (1974) (third printing)
- 66105 SF K.H. Scheer & Kurt Mahr Perry Rhodan 5: The Vega Sector (1974) (third printing)
- 66106 SF Clark Darlton Perry Rhodan 6: The Secret of the Time Vault
- 66107 SF K.H. Scheer Perry Rhodan 7: Fortress of the Six Moons
- 66108 SF Clark Darlton Perry Rhodan 8: The Galactic Riddle
- 66109 SF Clark Darlton Perry Rhodan 9: Quest thru Time and Space
- 66110 SF Kurt Mahr Perry Rhodan 10: The Ghosts of Gol
- 66111 SF Kurt Mahr Perry Rhodan 11: The Planet of the Dying Sun
- 66112 SF Clark Darlton Perry Rhodan 12: The Rebels of Tuglan
- 66113 SF K.H. Scheer Perry Rhodan 13: The Immortal Unknown
- 66114 SF Kurt Mahr Perry Rhodan 14: Venus in Danger
- 66115 SF Clark Darlton Perry Rhodan 15: Escape to Venus
- 66116 SF W.W. Shols Perry Rhodan 16: Secret Barrier X
- 66117 SF Kurt Mahr Perry Rhodan 17: The Venus Trap
- 66118 SF Kurt Mahr Perry Rhodan 18: Menace of the Mutant Master (second printing)
- 66119 SF Clark Darlton Perry Rhodan 19: Mutants vs. Mutants (second printing)
- 66121 SF W.W. Shols Perry Rhodan: Robot Threat: New York / Hans Kneifel Atlan #3: Pale Country Pursuit
- 66128 SF K.H. Scheer Atlan #4: The Crystal Prince / Clark Darlton Atlan #5: War of the Ghosts
- 66129 SF Clark Darlton Perry Rhodan: In the Center of the Galaxy (1978)
- 66141 SF Walt Richmond and Leigh Richmond Phase 2
- 66160 SF Nick Kamin Earthrim / Walt Richmond and Leigh Richmond Phoenix Ship (December 1969)
- 66201 SF Joanna Russ Picnic on Paradise
- 66320 SF Robert E. Howard Pigeons from Hell (1978)
- 66502 SF Edgar Rice Burroughs Pirates of Venus
- 66503 SF Edgar Rice Burroughs Pirates of Venus
- 66505 SF Edgar Rice Burroughs Pirates of Venus
- 66509 SF Edgar Rice Burroughs Pirates of Venus
- 66525 SF Murray Leinster The Mutant Weapon / Pirates of Zan (October 1971)
- 66833 SF Andre Norton Plague Ship (1973)
- 66900 SF Jack Vance Planet of Adventure#2: Servants of the Wankh
- 66901 SF Jack Vance Planet of Adventure#3: The Dirdir (1969)
- 66902 SF Jack Vance Planet of Adventure#4: The Pnume (1970)
- 66952 SF Ursula K. Le Guin Planet of Exile
- 66995 SF Mack Reynolds The Rival Rigelians / Planetary Agent X (September 1973)
- 67020 SF Marion Zimmer Bradley The Planet Savers
- 67021 SF Marion Zimmer Bradley The Planet Savers / The Sword of Aldones
- 67025 SF Marion Zimmer Bradley The Planet Savers / The Sword of Aldones
- 67026 SF Marion Zimmer Bradley The Planet Savers / The Sword of Aldones
- 67027 SF Marion Zimmer Bradley The Planet Savers / The Sword of Aldones
- 67060 SF John Jakes The Planet Wizard
- 67061 SF John Jakes The Planet Wizard
- 67110 NA Jack Vance (as John Holbrook Vance) The Pleasant Grove Murder (1967)
- 67131 NA L. L. Foreman Plundering Gun
- 67145 SF Michael Kurland Pluribus
- 67402 SF Robert A. Heinlein Podkayne of Mars
- 67555 SF Andre Norton Postmarked the Stars (1969)
- 67580 WE Ray Hogan The Vengeance Gun / L. L. Foreman Powdersmoke Partners (1973)
- 67800 SF Philip K. Dick The Preserving Machine (1969)
- 67801 SF Philip K. Dick The Preserving Machine (1976)
- 67900 SF Thomas M. Disch The Prisoner (1969)
- 67901 SF David McDaniel The Prisoner#2
- 67902 SF Hank Stine The Prisoner#3 (1970)
- 67937 SF L. Sprague de Camp The Prisoner of Zhamanak
- 68023 SF Gordon R. Dickson Pro
- 68305 SF Stephen Robinette Projections
- 68310 SF John Glasby Project Jove / Ken Bulmer The Hunters of Jundagai (August 1971)
- 69168 SF Arsen Darnay The Purgatory Zone (1981)
- 69190 SF L. Sprague de Camp The Purple Pterodactyls: The Adventures of Wilson Newbury, Ensorcelled Financier (1980)
- 69540 SF D. G. Compton The Quality of Mercy
- 69658 SF L. Sprague de Camp The Queen of Zamba
- 69681 SF Andre Norton Quest Crosstime
- 69682 SF Andre Norton Quest Crosstime
- 69683 SF Andre Norton Quest Crosstime
- 69684 SF Andre Norton Quest Crosstime
- 69700 SF A. E. van Vogt Quest for the Future
- 69770 SF Poul Anderson Question and Answer
- 69992 SF Jack L. Chalker Quintara Marathon#1: The Demons at Rainbow Bridge
- 70350 WE Nelson Nye Hideout Mountain / Rafe (1962)
- 71000 NA Manfred von Richthofen The Red Baron (1969)
- 71001 NA Manfred von Richthofen The Red Baron
- 71065 SF Alfred Coppel (as Robert Cham Gilman) The Rebel of Rhada (1968)
- 71076 NA Clifton Adams Reckless Men
- 71082 SF Claude Nunes and Rhoda Nunes Recoil / E. C. Tubb Lallia (April 1971)
- 71083 SF E. C. Tubb Lallia: Dumarest of Terra#6 (1982)
- 71100 SF Andre Norton Red Hart Magic (1979)
- 71140 SF Robert A. Heinlein Red Planet
- 71156 SF David C. Smith and Richard L. Tierney The Ring of Ikribu: Red Sonja#1 (1981)
- 71157 SF David C. Smith and Richard L. Tierney Demon Night: Red Sonja#2 (1982)
- 71158 SF David C. Smith and Richard L. Tierney When Hell Laughs: Red Sonja#3 (1982)
- 71159 SF David C. Smith and Richard L. Tierney Endithor's Daughter: Red Sonja#4 (1982)
- 71160 SF D. D. Chapman and Deloris Lehman Tarzan Red Tide
- 71161 SF David C. Smith and Richard L. Tierney Against the Prince of Hell: Red Sonja#5 (1983)
- 71162 SF David C. Smith and Richard L. Tierney Star of Doom: Red Sonja#6 (1983)
- 71335 SF Philip José Farmer Behind the Walls of Terra (1970)
- 71372 WE Louis Trimble The Hostile Peaks / Tom West Renegade Roundup (1969)
- 71435 SF John T. Sladek Mechasm
- 71500 SF A. E. van Vogt The Silkie
- 71502 SF Keith Laumer Retief at Large
- 71803 SF E. C. Tubb Lallia
- 71816 NA Edgar Rice Burroughs The Return of the Mucker
- 72260 WE Gordon D. Shirreffs Quicktrigger / Rio Desperado
- 72280 NA Edgar Rice Burroughs The Rider (1915)
- 72360 WE John Callahan Ride the Wild Land / Jernigan (1965)
- 72400 SF A. Bertram Chandler The Rim Gods / Laurence M. Janifer & S. J. Treibich The High Hex (February 1969)
- 72401 SF A. Bertram Chandler The Dark Dimension / The Rim Gods
- 72402 SF A. Bertram Chandler The Rim of Space / The Ship from Outside
- 72403 SF A. Bertram Chandler The Dark Dimension / The Rim Gods (August 1978)
- 72525 WE Brian Garfield (as Frank Wynne) Call Me Hazard / Dean Owen The Rincon Trap (1966)
- 73100 SF A. Bertram Chandler The Road to the Rim / The Hard Way Up
- 73101 SF A. Bertram Chandler The Road to the Rim / The Hard Way Up
- 73102 SF A. Bertram Chandler The Road to the Rim / The Hard Way Up
- 73291 SF Ursula K. Le Guin Rocannon's World (May 1972)
- 73292 SF Ursula K. Le Guin Rocannon's World (November 1974)
- 73293 SF Ursula K. Le Guin Rocannon's World (1976)
- 73330 SF Robert A. Heinlein Rocket Ship Galileo
- 73390 SF Avram Davidson The Kar-Chee Reign / Rogue Dragon
- 73425 WE L. L. Foreman Rogue's Legacy (1968)
- 73438 SF Kenneth Bulmer Roller Coaster World
- 73440 SF Robert A. Heinlein The Rolling Stones
- 73441 SF Robert A. Heinlein The Rolling Stones
- 73450 SF Mack Reynolds Rolltown
- 73471 NA Monica Dickens The Room Upstairs
- 73532 SF Andre Norton Secret of the Lost Race
- 74180 WE Barry Cord Desert Knights / The Running Iron Samaritans (1973)
- 74860 SF Robert A. Heinlein To Sail Beyond the Sunset
- 74981 SF Andre Norton Sargasso of Space (1970)
- 74982 SF Andre Norton Sargasso of Space
- 74983 SF Andre Norton Sargasso of Space (1974)
- 74984 SF Andre Norton Sargasso of Space (July 1978)
- 74985 SF Andre Norton Sargasso of Space (1981)
- 74987 SF Andre Norton Sargasso of Space (September 1985)
- 75045 SF Mack Reynolds Satellite City
- 75131 SF Edgar Rice Burroughs Savage Pellucidar
- 75134 SF Edgar Rice Burroughs Savage Pellucidar
- 75136 SF Edgar Rice Burroughs Savage Pellucidar
- 75150 WE Ray Hogan Track the Man Down / Lee. E. Wells Savage Range (1965)
- 75181 NA Jean Vicary Saverstall
- 75441 SF Sam J. Lundwall Science Fiction: What It's All About (1977)
- 75520 WE Tom West Scorpion Showdown / Clay Ringold Reckoning in Fire Valley (1969)
- 75617 NA Ray Hogan Showdown on Texas Flat
- 75690 SF George Bamber The Sea Is Boiling Hot
- 75695 SF Andre Norton Sea Siege
- 75696 SF Andre Norton Sea Siege
- 75750 NA Sax Rohmer The Secret of Holm Peel and Other Strange Stories (1970)
- 75781 SF Leigh Brackett The Secret of Sinharat / Leigh Brackett People of the Talisman (November 1971)
- 75800 SF George Bamber The Sea Is Boiling Hot (1971)
- 75830 SF Andre Norton Secret of the Lost Race
- 75831 SF Andre Norton Secret of the Lost Race
- 75832 SF Andre Norton Secret of the Lost Race
- 75833 SF Andre Norton Secret of the Lost Race (1978)
- 75834 SF Andre Norton Secret of the Lost Race (1981)
- 75835 SF Andre Norton Secret of the Lost Race
- 75836 SF Andre Norton Secret of the Lost Race
- 75860 SF Mack Reynolds Section G: United Planets
- 75875 SF Robert Silverberg The Seeds of Earth
- 75894 SF Eric Frank Russell Sentinels from Space
- 75940 SF Marion Zimmer Bradley Seven from the Stars
- 75945 NA Ron Goulart The Same Lie Twice (1973)
- 75958 NA Brad Steiger Sex and Satanism (1969)
- 75968 WE Nelson Nye Bancroft's Banco / The Seven Six-Gunners (1963)
- 75980 NA Barbara Levins Sexual Power of Marijuana
- 75987 NA Ruth Abbey The Shadow Between (1974)
- 76015 WE Robert Mccaig The Shadow Maker (1970)
- 76096 SF Jeff Sutton Alton's Unguessable / Kenneth Bulmer The Ships of Durostorum (June 1970)
- 76098 SF Bob Shaw Ship of Strangers
- 76099 SF Robert E. Howard The She Devil (1983)
- 76181 NA Louis L'Amour (as Jim Mayo) Showdown at Yellow Butte
- 76219 SF Robert Silverberg and Randall Garrett (jointly as Robert Randall) The Shrouded Planet (1982)
- 76343 SF Charles Sheffield Sight of Proteus
- 76380 SF William F. Temple Battle on Venus / William F. Temple The Three Suns of Amara (June 1973)
- 76385 SF D. G. Compton The Silent Multitude
- 76390 SF Robert Silverberg The Silent Invaders
- 76391 SF Robert Silverberg The Silent Invaders (1977)
- 76500 SF A. E. van Vogt The Silkie
- 76501 SF A. E. van Vogt The Silkie
- 76502 SF A. E. van Vogt The Silkie
- 76701 SF Philip K. Dick The Simulacra (1976)
- 76801 SF Andre Norton The Sioux Spaceman
- 76802 SF Andre Norton The Sioux Spaceman
- 76836 SF Walt Richmond and Leigh Richmond Siva! (1979)
- 76900 WE Dean Owens The Skull Riders / Merle Constiner The Man Who Shot "The Kid" (1969)
- 76942 SF Harry Harrison Skyfall (1978)
- 76960 SF Lester del Rey Badge of Infamy / The Sky is Falling (January 1973)
- 76972 NA Dorothy Eden Sleep in the Woods (1967)
- 77051 NA Margaret Erskine Sleep No More
- 77408 SF Rudy Rucker Software
- 77410 SF Philip K. Dick Solar Lottery (1974)
- 77411 SF Philip K. Dick Solar Lottery (1975)
- 77419 SF Gordon R. Dickson Soldier, Ask Not (1982)
- 77425 NA Betty Deforrest The Shows of Yesterday
- 77427 SF Brian Herbert (ed.) The Poetry of Frank Herbert: Songs of Muad'dib
- 77471 NA Anne Maybury Someone Waiting (1961)
- 77520 NA Wayne Lee Son of a Gunman / Barry Cord Gun Boss of Triangle
- 77525 SF Jack Vance Son of the Tree / The Houses of Iszm (December 1971)
- 77551 SF Andre Norton Sorceress of the Witch World (1970)
- 77553 SF Andre Norton Sorceress of the Witch World (1976)
- 77554 SF Andre Norton Sorceress of the Witch World (1977)
- 77555 SF Andre Norton Sorceress of the Witch World (November 1978)
- 77556 SF Andre Norton Sorceress of the Witch World (May 1983)
- 77558 SF Andre Norton Sorceress of the Witch World (1986)
- 77598 NA Kenneth Von Gunden The Sounding Stillness
- 77620 SF Robert E. Howard The Sowers of the Thunder (1979)
- 77710 SF Robert Lory The Eyes of Bolsk / Mack Reynolds The Space Barbarians (June 1969)
- 77730 SF Robert A. Heinlein Space Cadet
- 77780 SF H. Beam Piper Space Viking
- 77782 SF Mack Reynolds Space Visitor
- 77783 SF Mack Reynolds Space Visitor
- 77785 SF Eric Frank Russell Six Worlds Yonder 6 unrelated stories. / The Space Willies A spoof on Scientology. (July 1971)
- 77791 SF Fred Saberhagen Specimens
- 77841 NA S.E. Stevenson Spring Magic
- 77905 NA Jane Blackmore The Square of Many Colours
- 77910 WE Dwight Bennett Newton (as Clement Hardin) Stage Line to Rincon / Ray Hogan A Man Called Ryker (1971)
- 77918 WE James Powell Stage to Seven Springs
- 77925 WE Stephen Payne Stampede on Farway Pass / Brian Garfield (as Frank Wynne) Lynch Law Canyon (1965)
- 77953 SF Marion Zimmer Bradley Star of Danger
- 78000 SF Robert A. Heinlein The Star Beast
- 78011 SF Andre Norton Star Born (1970)
- 78014 SF Andre Norton Star Born (July 1978)
- 78015 SF Andre Norton Star Born (February 1980)
- 78016 SF Andre Norton Star Born (May 1981)
- 78017 SF Andre Norton Star Born (September 1984)
- 78035 SF Keith Laumer Star Colony
- 78071 SF Andre Norton Star Gate (June 1971)
- 78072 SF Andre Norton Star Gate (February 1974)
- 78073 SF Andre Norton Star Gate (March 1977)
- 78131 SF Andre Norton Star Guard (June 1973)
- 78132 SF Andre Norton Star Guard (June 1974)
- 78133 SF Andre Norton Star Guard (March 1977)
- 78318 SF Pamela Sargent Starshadows
- 78400 SF John Jakes Mask of Chaos / Barrington Bayley The Star Virus (August 1970)
- 78432 SF Andre Norton The Stars Are Ours
- 78477 SF Gerry Turnbull (ed.) A Star Trek Catalog: The Complete Guide to the Fantastic World of Star Trek (1979)
- 78479 SF Ben Bova Star Watchman
- 78500 NA Warren Smith Strange & Miraculous Cures (1969)
- 78537 SF Robert Sheckley The Status Civilization / Notions: Unlimited
- 78565 SF John Varley Steel Beach
- 78575 SF D. G. Compton The Steel Crocodile (1970)
- 78585 SF Jerry Pournelle A Step Farther Out
- 78650 SF Philip José Farmer The Stone God Awakens (1970)
- 78651 SF Philip José Farmer The Stone God Awakens (1973)
- 78652 SF Philip José Farmer The Stone God Awakens (1975)
- 78653 SF Philip José Farmer The Stone God Awakens (1979)
- 78654 SF Philip José Farmer The Stone God Awakens (1980)
- 78657 SF Poul Anderson Dominic Flandry: A Stone in Heaven
- 78741 SF Andre Norton Storm Over Warlock
- 78742 SF Andre Norton Storm Over Warlock (1973)
- 78830 WE Giles A. Lutz The Stranger
- 78901 NA Brad Steiger Strange Guests (1966)
- 79001 NA Bernhardt J. Hurwood Strange Talents
- 79034 SF Robert A. Heinlein Stranger in a Strange Land
- 79112 SF Marion Zimmer Bradley Survey Ship
- 79117 WE Tom West Sweetgrass Valley Showdown / Owen Gun Country (1971)
- 79141 SF Leigh Brackett The Sword of Rhiannon
- 79150 SF Fritz Leiber Swords Against Death
- 79157 SF Fritz Leiber Swords Against Death
- 79161 SF Fritz Leiber Swords Against Wizardry
- 79165 SF Fritz Leiber Swords Against Wizardry
- 79170 SF Fritz Leiber Swords and Deviltry
- 79176 SF Fritz Leiber Swords and Deviltry
- 79181 SF Fritz Leiber Swords in the Mist
- 79185 SF Fritz Leiber Swords in the Mist
- 79221 SF Fritz Leiber The Swords of Lankhmar
- 79222 SF Fritz Leiber The Swords of Lankhmar
- 79431 SF Andre Norton The Stars Are Ours
- 79601 WE Roger Spellman Tall for a Texan / Big Man from the Brazos (1965)
- 79791 SF Edgar Rice Burroughs Tanar of Pellucidar
- 79797 SF Edgar Rice Burroughs Tanar of Pellucidar
- 79805 NA Roy Manning Tangled Trail
- 79854 SF Edgar Rice Burroughs Tarzan at the Earth's Core
- 79970 NA Isobel Lambot A Taste of Murder
- 79975 SF E. C. Tubb Technos / E. C. Tubb A Scatter of Stardus (March 1972)
- 80010 SF William Shatner Teklords
- 80011 SF William Shatner Teklab
- 80012 SF William Shatner Tekvengeance
- 80180 SF James Tiptree, Jr. Ten Thousand Light-Years from Home
- 80208 SF William Shatner Tekwar
- 80400 WE Nelson Nye The Texas Gun
- 80575 WE Nelson Nye Thief River
- 80661 NA Mildred Davis The Third Half
- 80680 SF Robert Lory The Thirteen Bracelets
- 80691 SF Roger Zelazny This Immortal
- 80705 SF Robert E. Howard Tigers of the Sea
- 80780 SF Robert E. Howard Three-Bladed Doom (1979)
- 80801 SF Andre Norton Three Against the Witch World
- 80805 SF Andre Norton Three Against the Witch World (1978)
- 80855 SF Alexei Panshin The Thurb Revolution (1978)
- 80933 SF Spider Robinson Time Pressure (1988)
- 81000 SF Clifford D. Simak Time & Again
- 81001 SF Clifford D. Simak Time & Again
- 81012 SF Keith Laumer The Time Bender
- 81125 SF Robert A. Heinlein Time for the Stars
- 81126 SF Robert A. Heinlein Time for the Stars
- 81237 SF Gordon R. Dickson Time to Teleport / Delusion World
- 81251 SF Andre Norton The Time Traders
- 81253 SF Andre Norton The Time Traders
- 81254 SF Andre Norton The Time Traders (1984)
- 81270 SF John Brunner Times Without Number (1969)
- 81277 SF Spider Robinson Time Travelers Strictly Cash (1981)
- 81610 SF Donald A. Wollheim (as David Grinnell) To Venus! To Venus! / E. C. Tubb The Jester at Scar (March 1970)
- 81656 SF Bob Shaw Tomorrow Lies in Ambush
- 81670 SF Mack Reynolds Tomorrow Might Be Different
- 81680 SF John Jakes Tonight We Steal the Stars / Laurence M. Janifer and S. J. Treibich The Wagered World (July 1969)
- 81861 WE Merle Constiner Guns at Q Cross / Tom West The Toughest Town in the Territory
- 81900 SF Thomas Burnett Swann The Tournament of Thorns
- 81973 SF E. C. Tubb Toyman: Dumarest of Terra#3
- 82101 WE Brian Garfield Trail Drive / Louis Trimble Trouble at Gunsight (1964)
- 82190 WE Harry Whittington A Trap For Sam Dodge / Valley of Savage Men (1965)
- 82210 SF John Brunner The Traveler in Black
- 82355 SF Andre Norton Trey of Swords (1978)
- 82401 NA Ernest Haycox Trigger Trio
- 82410 WE D.B. Newton Triple Trouble
- 82430 WE Nelson Nye Trouble at Quinn's Crossing
- 82435 WE Barry Cord The Coffin Fillers / Don T. Jenison Trouble on Diamond Seven (1972)
- 82660 SF Robert A. Heinlein Tunnel in the Sky
- 83360 WE Barry Cord Two Graves for a Lawman / The Deadly Amigos
- 84000 SF Andre Norton Uncharted Stars (1970)
- 84001 SF Andre Norton Uncharted Stars (1974)
- 84292 SF H. Beam Piper Uller Uprising
- 84331 SF John W. Campbell The Ultimate Weapon
- 84466 SF Andre Norton Uncharted Stars (1983)
- 84514 SF Andrew Offutt The Undying Wizard
- 84569 SF Axel Madsen Unisave
- 84581 SF A. E. van Vogt The Universe Maker
- 85456 SF Alan E. Nourse The Universe Between (1987)
- 85460 NA Harold E. Hartney Up & At 'Em
- 86022 NA Virginia Coffman Vampire of Moura
- 86050 SF Philip K. Dick The Variable Man and Other Stories (1976)
- 86064 SF Fred Saberhagen The Veils of Azlaroc
- 86065 SF Fred Saberhagen The Veils of Azlaroc
- 86180 SF E. C. Tubb Veruchia
- 86181 SF E. C. Tubb Veruchia: Dumarest of Terra#8 (1982)
- 86190 SF Ian Watson Very Slow Time Machine
- 86321 SF Andre Norton Victory on Janus (March 1973)
- 86322 SF Andre Norton Victory on Janus (1975)
- 86323 SF Andre Norton Victory on Janus (1977)
- 86465 WE Don P. Jenison Zero Hour at Black Butte / Dwight Bennett Newton (as Clement Hardin) Sherriff of Sentinel (1969)
- 86495 SF L. Sprague de Camp The Virgin of Zesh / The Tower of Zanid
- 86607 SF Mark Adlard Volteface (1972)
- 86608 SF Philip K. Dick Vulcan's Hammer (1972)
- 86610 SF Andre Norton, Wojciech Siudmak, and Alicia Austin Voorloper (1980)
- 87015 NA Philip Loraine One to Curtis (1967)
- 87060 SF Michael Moorcock The Warlord of the Air (1971)
- 87070 NA Daoma Winston Walk Around the Square (1975)
- 87101 NA Rona Randall Walk Into My Parlor
- 87180 SF A. E. van Vogt The War Against the Rull
- 87201 SF Poul Anderson War of the Wing-Men
- 87269 SF George Zebrowski Ashes & Stars
- 87300 SF Christopher Shasheff The Warlock in Spite of Himself
- 87301 SF Christopher Shasheff The Warlock in Spite of Himself
- 87319 SF Andre Norton Warlock of the Witch World
- 87321 SF Andre Norton Warlock of the Witch World
- 87322 SF Andre Norton Warlock of the Witch World
- 87323 SF Andre Norton Warlock of the Witch World (1978)
- 87325 SF Christopher Stasheff Warlock Unlocked
- 87328 SF Christopher Stasheff Warlock Unlocked
- 87332 SF Christopher Stasheff Warlock Unlocked
- 87370 NA Herman Raucher Watermelon Man
- 87625 SF Dennis Schmidt Way-Farer
- 87631 SF H. G. Wells The War of the Worlds (1988)
- 87718 NA Harlan Ellison Web of the City (1983)
- 87855 SF A. E. van Vogt The Weapons Shops of Isher
- 87873 SF Andre Norton Web of the Witch World
- 87874 SF Andre Norton Web of the Witch World
- 87875 SF Andre Norton Web of the Witch World
- 87941 SF Thomas Burnett Swann The Weirwoods
- 88010 WE T.V. Olsen Westward They Rode
- 88065 SF Edmond Hamilton What's It Like Out There? (And Other Stories)
- 88075 NA Richard Lamparski Whatever Became Of.....? Volume I
- 88076 NA Richard Lamparski Whatever Became Of.....? Volume II (1970)
- 88091 SF H. G. Wells When the Sleeper Wakes
- 88270 SF Thomas Burnett Swann Where Is the Bird of Fire? (1970)
- 88440 NA Nelle McFather Whispering Island
- 88554 NA Dorothy Eden Whistle For the Grows
- 88564 SF Rudy Rucker White Light
- 88601 SF Clifford D. Simak Why Call Them Back from Heaven?
- 89250 SF Marion Zimmer Bradley The Winds of Darkover / John Rackham The Anything Tree (January 1970)
- 89251 SF Marion Zimmer Bradley The Winds of Darkover
- 89301 SF E. C. Tubb Derai / The Winds of Gath (July 1973)
- 89590 WE L. P. Holmes Smoky Pass / L. P. Holmes Wolf Brand (1962)
- 89701 SF Andre Norton Witch World
- 89702 SF Andre Norton Witch World (May 1974)
- 89703 SF Andre Norton Witch World
- 89704 SF Andre Norton Witch World
- 89705 SF Andre Norton Witch World (1978)
- 89706 SF Andre Norton Witch World (1982)
- 89707 SF Andre Norton Witch World (1984)
- 89708 SF Andre Norton Witch World (1986)
- 89851 SF James H. Schmitz The Witches of Karres
- 90050 NA Charles Lefebure Witness to Witchcraft (1970)
- 90075 SF Ursula K. Le Guin A Wizard of Earthsea
- 90110 NA Georgette Heyer Venetia (1958)
- 90190 SF Edgar Rice Burroughs The Wizard of Venus and Pirate Blood
- 90191 SF Edgar Rice Burroughs The Wizard of Venus (1973)
- 90194 SF Edgar Rice Burroughs The Wizard of Venus and Pirate Blood
- 90426 NA Lee Hoffman Gunfight at Laramie
- 90701 NA Robert J. Hogan The Wolver
- 90872 SF R.A. Salvatore The Woods Out Back
- 90926 SF Frank Herbert The Worlds of Frank Herbert (1971)
- 90951 SF Philip K. Dick The World Jones Made (1975)
- 90955 SF Jack Vance The World of Jack Vance
- 91010 SF Gregory Frost Lyrec (1984)
- 91052 SF John Carr (ed.) The Worlds of H. Beam Piper
- 91055 SF Poul Anderson The Worlds of Poul Anderson
- 91060 SF Theodore Sturgeon The Worlds of Theodore Sturgeon
- 91170 SF Marion Zimmer Bradley The World Wreckers
- 91352 SF Donald A. Wollheim and Terry Carr (eds.) World's Best Science Fiction, 1969
- 91353 SF Donald A. Wollheim and Terry Carr (eds.) World's Best Science Fiction, First Series
- 91354 SF Donald A. Wollheim and Terry Carr (eds.) World's Best Science Fiction, Second Series
- 91355 SF Donald A. Wollheim and Terry Carr (eds.) World's Best Science Fiction, Third Series
- 91356 SF Donald A. Wollheim and Terry Carr (eds.) World's Best Science Fiction, Fourth Series
- 91357 SF Donald A. Wollheim and Terry Carr (eds.) World's Best Science Fiction, 1970
- 91358 SF Donald A. Wollheim and Terry Carr (eds.) World's Best Science Fiction, 1971
- 91359 SF Fredrick Pohl Best Sf For 1972
- 91502 SF Robert A. Heinlein The Worlds of Robert A. Heinlein (1973)
- 91581 SF Keith Laumer Worlds of the Imperium
- 91640 SF Fritz Leiber The Worlds of Fritz Leiber
- 91706 SF Poul Anderson World Without Stars
- 91770 SF Robert E. Howard Worms of the Earth
- 92551 SF Andre Norton The X Factor
- 92553 SF Andre Norton The X Factor
- 93900 SF Ross Rocklynne The Sun Destroyers / Edmond Hamilton A Yank at Valhalla (March 1973)
- 94200 SF Wilson Tucker The Year of the Quiet Sun (1970)
- 94251 SF Andre Norton Year of the Unicorn
- 94254 SF Andre Norton Year of the Unicorn (1979)
- 95490 SF Andre Norton Zarsthor's Bane (November 1978)
- 95491 SF Andre Norton Zarsthor's Bane (1981 & 1983)
- 95492 SF Andre Norton Zarsthor's Bane (January 1984)
- 95493 SF Andre Norton Zarsthor's Bane (August 1986)
- 95501 NA Arch Whitehouse The Zeppelin Fighters
- 95941 SF Andre Norton Zarsthor's Bane
- 95960 SF Andre Norton The Zero Stone
- 95961 SF Andre Norton The Zero Stone
- 95964 SF Andre Norton The Zero Stone (1981)
