= List of Ace titles in M series =

Ace Books published its M series of books from 1964 to 1966, at a price of 45 cents.

- M-100 WE John Callahan A Man Named Raglan / Barry Cord Gun Junction (1964)
- M-101 SF Leigh Brackett The Secret of Sinharat / People of the Talisman (1964)
- M-102 WE Ray Hogan Hoodoo Guns / Rod Patterson Trouble At Hangdog Flats (1964)
- M-103 SF Fred Saberhagen The Golden People / Lan Wright Exile From Xanadu (1964)
- M-104 WE Tom West Sidewinder Showdown / Dan J. Stevens Land Beyond The Law
- M-105 SF Margaret St. Clair Message From the Eocene / Three Worlds of Futury (1964)
- M-106 WE Reese Sullivan The Blind Trail / Tim Kelly Ride Of Fury (1964)
- M-107 SF A. Bertram Chandler The Coils of Time / Into The Alternate Universe (1964)
- M-108 WE Rod Patterson Gunfire Heritage / Wayne C. Lee Warpath West (1965)
- M-109 SF G.C. Edmondson Stranger Than You Think / The Ship That Sailed the Time Stream (1965)
- M-110 WE Tom West Bushwack Brand / Merle Constiner Wolf On Horseback (1965)
- M-111 SF Edmond Hamilton Fugitive of the Stars / Kenneth Bulmer Land Beyond the Map (1965)
- M-112 WE Nelson Nye Rogue's Rendezvous / Gun Feud At Tiedown
- M-113 SF Damon Knight Off Center / The Rithian Terror (1965)
- M-114 WE Brian Garfield (as Frank Wynne) Lynch Law Canyon / Stephen Payne Stampede On Farway Pass
- M-115 SF John Brunner The Repairmen of Cyclops / Enigma From Tantalus (1965)
- M-116 SF Robert P. Mills (ed.) The Best From Fantasy And Science Fiction, Tenth Series
- M-117 SF Bruce W. Ronald Our Man in Space / Jack Sharkey Ultimatum in 2050 A.D. (1965)
- M-118 WE Merle Constiner Guns At Q Cross / Tom West The Toughest Town In The Territory (1965)
- M-119 SF Jules Verne Journey to the Center of the Earth (1965)
- M-120 WE Nelson Nye Ambush At Yuma's Chimney / John Callahan Ride The Wild Land (1965)
- M-121 SF Emil Petaja Alpha Yes, Terra No! / Samuel R. Delany The Ballad of Beta-2 (1965)
- M-122 WE Roger G. Spellman Tall For A Texan / William Vance Outlaw Brand (1965)
- M-123 SF John Brunner The Altar on Asconel / Ted White Android Avenger (1965)
- M-124 WE Stephen Payne Trail Of The Vanishing Ranchers / Tom West Battle At Rattlesnake Pass (1965)
- M-125 SF Jack Vance Monsters in Orbit / The World Between and Other Stories (1965)
- M-126 WE Harry Whittington Valley Of Savage Men / Ben Elliott Brother Badman (1965)
- M-127 SF John Rackham We, The Venusians / Fred Saberhagen The Water of Thought (1965)
- M-128 WE Brian Garfield (as Brian Wynne) The Night It Rained Bullets / Reese Sullivan Nemesis Of Circle A (1965)
- M-129 SF A. Bertram Chandler The Alternate Martians / A. Bertram Chandler Empress of Outer Space (1965)
- M-130 WE John Callahan Half-Injun, Half-Wildcat / Clement Hardin Outcast Of Ute Bend (1965)
- M-131 SF Kenneth Bulmer Behold The Stars / Mack Reynolds Planetary Agent X (1965)
- M-132 SF Robert W. Chambers The King in Yellow (1965)
- M-133 SF A. Bertram Chandler Space Mercenaries / Emil PetajaThe Caves of Mars (1965)
- M-134 WE Tom West Lost Loot Of Kittycat Ranch / Lin Searles Saddle The Wind (1965)
- M-135 SF Philip E. High The Mad Metropolis / Murray Leinster Space Captain (1966)
- M-136 WE Ray Hogan Panhandle Pistolero / Nelson Nye The Marshall Of Pioche (1966)
- M-137 SF Robert P. Mills (ed.) The Best From Fantasy And Science Fiction, Eleventh Series (1966)
- M-138 WE Brian Garfield (as Frank Wynne) Call Me Hazard / Dean Owens The Rincon Trap (1966)
- M-139 SF Samuel R. Delany Empire Star / Tom Purdom The Tree Lord of Imeten (1966)
- M-140 WE Reese Sullivan Deadly Like A .45 / Barry Cord Last Stage To Gomorrah (1966)
- M-141 SF Jack Vance The Brains of Earth / The Many Worlds of Magnus Ridolph (1966)
- M-142 SF H.F. Heard Doppelgangers (1966)
- M-143 SF John W. Campbell Islands of Space (1966)
- M-144 WE Ernest Haycox Trigger Trio (1966)
- M-145 NA Elizabeth Kellier The Patient at Tonesburry Manor (1966)
- M-146 NA anonymous (ed.) Cracked Again (1966)
- M-147 SF Andre Norton The Stars Are Ours!
- M-148 SF Andre Norton Star Born (1966)
- M-149 SF James Holbrook Vance (as Jack Vance) The Eyes of the Overworld (1966)
- M-150 SF Andre Norton The Defiant Agents
- M-151 SF Andre Norton The Last Planet
- M-152 SF H. Warner Munn King Of The World's Edge (1966)
- M-153 SF A. E. van Vogt The Weapon Makers (1966)
- M-154 SF John W. Campbell Invaders from the Infinite (1966)
- M-155 SF Roger Zelazny Four For Tomorrow (1966)
- M-156 SF Andre Norton Key Out Of Time (1966)
- M-157 SF Andre Norton Star Gate (1966)
- M-158 WE Brian Garfield (as Brian Wynne) The Proud Riders (1966)
- M-159 NA Sylvia Lloyd Down East Nurse (1965)
- M-160 WE Nelson Nye Trail Of Lost Skulls (C. 1)
- M-161 NA Sharon Heath Nurse at Moorcroft Manor (1965)
- M-162 SF Donald A. Wollheim (as David Grinnell) Edge Of Time (1966)
- M-163 NA Ray Hogan Wolver
- M-164 NA Suzanne Roberts Cross Country Nurse
- M-165 SF Keith Laumer Worlds Of The Imperium (1966)
