= Michael Connor =

Michael Connor may refer to:

- Michael L. Connor, American politician and government official
- Michael J. Connor, US Navy admiral
- Michael Connor (voice actor) in Spyro the Dragon
- Michael Connor (screenwriter) of Sword of Freedom
- Mike Connor (author), see List of Ace titles in numeric series
- Mike Connor (rugby league), player for South Wales Scorpions

== See also ==
- Michael Connors (disambiguation)
