= Utopia (German science fiction) =

Utopia was the name of several science fiction series published by Erich Pabel Verlag, Rastatt. Together with the Terra series of the rival publisher Arthur Moewig Verlag, Munich, the Utopia series were the most important science fiction work in the early years of West Germany.

== Utopia Zukunftsromane ==
Utopia Zukunftsromane (future novels) was a dime novel series which was produced between 1953 and 1968 and reached 596 volumes. To distinguish Zukunftsromane from Großband ("big issue", see below) they also were unofficially called "Kleinband" ("little issue").

=== Subseries (selection) and spin-off ===
All of the first 43 issues of Zukunftsromane belonged to the subseries Jim Parkers Abenteuer im Weltraum (adventures in space) written by Alf Tjörnsen and other authors. Sixteen more Parkers novels were printed within Zukunftsromane #48 to #129.

Apparently caused by the success of Moewigs series Perry Rhodan 1962 a new subseries started within Zukunftsroman #320 to #352: Mark Powers - Der Held des Weltalls (hero of space, Freder van Holk and others). In the end of 1962 Mark Powers became a separate series with 48 volumes. After the separate series was finalised some more Powers novels were printed within Zukunftsromane starting with #404.

Within Zukunftsromane #550 to #590 the subseries ad astra was published (21 volumes, 1967/68, H. G. Francis and others).

== Utopia Großband / Kriminal ==
1954 Pabel started a new series: Utopia Großband ("big issue")

Whereas a volume of Zukunftsromane normally had 64 pages a volume of Großband typically had 96 pages. Großband was finished 1963 with volume #204. Already with #197 Großband was renamed to "Sonderband" ("special issue") - the same name Utopia Magazin (see below) started what causes confusion until today.

The volumes #26/28/30/32 of Großband were subtitled "Kriminalroman aus der Welt von morgen" ("detective story from the world of tomorrow"). Subsequently, Pabel started a separate series with amazing detective stories: Utopia Kriminal (1956–58, 27 volumes).

== Utopia Magazin ==
1955 Pabel issued "Utopia Sonderband", a magazine with short stories and science fiction related articles.

With volume #3 Sonderband was renamed to "Utopia SF Magazin", with volume #10 it was renamed to Utopia Magazin. Utopia Magazin was finished 1959 with volume #26.

Editors of Utopia Magazin (and temporarily of the other Pabels series) were Walter Ernsting and Walter Spiegl.

== VPM reprints ==
End of the 1970s merged Pabel-Moewig Verlag (VPM), Rastatt started 3 paperbook series of reprints:

- Utopia Bestseller, 44 novels by K. H. Scheer (1978–82)
- Utopia Bestseller aus Zeit und Raum 39 novels by Wolf Detlef Rohr (1979–82)
- Utopia Classics 87 novels by German and international authors (1979–86)

== Other publishers ==
Between 1957 and 1960 57 issues of the pulp series Luna were published by Walter Lehning Verlag, Hanover. Originally the full name was Luna Utopia-Roman, with issue 29 the name was changed to Luna Weltraum (utopischer Roman). There was also a series by this publisher originally called UTR Luna Utopia Taschen Roman (10 paperbacks / 3 dime novel formats, 1957–59).

In the 1980s the East German publishing house Das Neue Berlin, Berlin produced the paperbacks SF-Utopia.

== See also ==
- Zukunftsfantasien

== External links and book ==
- http://www.dsfdb.org/reihen.php?a_z=U // title lists of Utopia Zukunftsromane etc.
- http://www.sf-hefte.homepage.t-online.de/ // title lists of Utopia Zukunftsromane etc.
- http://www.dieter-von-reeken.de/utogross/frame.htm // covers of Utopia Großband / Utopia Kriminal
- http://www.dieter-von-reeken.de/utomag/frame.htm // covers and contents of Utopia Magazin
- http://www.fictionfantasy.de/load.php?name=News&file=article&sid=4478 // title list of Mark Powers (separate series) and short (German) article.
- http://www.fictionfantasy.de/load.php?name=News&file=article&sid=4832 // SciFi-Paperback and Pulp-Series from 1945 to 1980
- http://scifi.gmxhome.de/mark.htm // title list of Mark Powers
- Volksbücher und Heftromane, volume 1, paperback, ISBN 3-8334-3232-2
