= Terra (German science fiction) =

Terra is a series of science fiction novels published by Arthur Moewig Verlag, Munich. Together with the Utopia series of the rival publisher Erich Pabel Verlag, Rastatt the Terra series were the most important science fiction work in the post-World War II West Germany.

== Dime novels ==
In 1957 Moewig started the weekly series Terra - Utopische Romane / Science Fiction, later renamed Terra SF, then only Terra''. For this venture some writers were poached from competitor Pabel, e.g. the editor and author Walter Ernsting, editor Günther M. Schelwokat and cover painter Johny Bruck.

In September 1962 Terra SF was supplemented by the reprint series Terra Extra. From that date onward Terra SF and Terra Extra were published in weekly rotation.

In 1968 both series were combined into the new weekly series Terra Nova, which later was replaced by Terra Astra'.

== Publication history ==
- Terra SF: 1957–68, 555 issues
- Terra Extra: 1962–68, 182 issues
- Terra Nova: 1968–71, 190 issues
- Terra Astra: 1971–86, 643 issues

== Sonderband / Taschenbuch ==
In 1958 Moewig started the series Terra Sonderband ("special issue"). Each issue of Sonderband had 100 pages, allowing more room to publish more challenging novels than within the dime novel format.

With issue #99 (1965) Terra Sonderband was renamed to Terra Taschenbuch ("paperback"), and published in paperback format.

== Subseries, spin-offs and more ==
The Terra series included some subseries of different German and international authors. For example, Isaac Asimov's Foundation series was published as Der 1000 Jahres Plan (The 1000 Year Plan) in issues 22/24/26/28, while E.E. Smith's Lensmen was published in Terra SF #199-222).

In 1968/69 adaptations of the seven episodes of the television series Raumpatrouille, plus five original stories, were published in Terra Taschenbuch. Additional new episodes (#13-35) were printed as separate paperback series.

Since 1972 the episodes were reprinted and continued within Terra Astra, outsourced to a separate dime novel series and finally again reintegrated into Terra Astra (145 volumes in total).

From March 1958 until May 1959 Moewig published 15 issues of the magazine Galaxis-Magazin, the German version of the American magazine Galaxy Science Fiction.

In 1961 Moewig started the space opera series Perry Rhodan which originally was written by K. H. Scheer, Walter Ernsting and other Terra related authors.
