= Jernigan =

Jernigan is a surname. Notable people with the surname include:

- Aaron Jernigan (1813–1891), early U.S. settler
- Anna Jernigan ("Anna Jay") (born 1998), American wrestler
- Billy Jernigan (1923–1997), American wrestler
- Candy Jernigan (1952–1991), U.S. artist and designer
- Darren Jernigan (born 1969), U.S. politician
- Dennis Jernigan (born 1959), U.S. Christian singer-songwriter
- Doug Jernigan (born 1946), U.S. musician
- Garrett Jernigan, American physicist and astronomer
- Gerald D. Jernigan (1942–2006), U.S. politician
- Harry Jernigan, fictional character from The Towering Inferno
- Jerrel Jernigan (born 1989), American football player
- Johnny Jernigan, American football coach and former player
- Joseph Paul Jernigan (1954–1993), U.S. murderer
- Kenneth Jernigan (1926–1998), blind U.S. civil rights activist
- Kenton Jernigan, U.S. squash player
- Mark Jernigan, American politician
- Tamara E. Jernigan (born 1959), U.S. scientist and astronaut
- Terry Jernigan (born 1951/1952), U.S. neuropsychologist
- Thomas R. Jernigan (1847–1920), U.S. diplomat, and consul general in Shanghai
- Wayne Jernigan (1941–2026), American businessman

== See also ==
- Jernigan (novel), by David Gates
