= Kurt Mahr =

German author

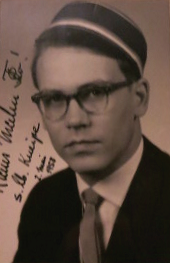
Mahr in the Couleur of his fraternity

Kurt Mahr (8 March 1934 – 27 June 1993, real name Klaus Mahn; former pseudonym Cecil O. Mailer) was a German author and one of the first authors of the series Perry-Rhodan, the largest Science fiction series of the world.

== Life ==
After his Abitur he moved to Darmstadt, where he joined the Corps Franconia Darmstadt. He started to study Civil engineering but changed in 1956 to physics. As examined Diplom physicist he moved to the United States, where he worked on a space travel program and acquired 1968 the American nationality. He also worked as computer expert for private clients. He lived until 1972 in the US and – after an intermezzo in Germany – from 1977 until his death. On 18 October 1985 he married his wife Inge Voltz in Florida.

As well as Perry-Rhodan magazine novels, he also wrote numerous Perry-Rodan planet novels, where he showed a talent to spin yarns. Both before and during his literary activities for the Perry-Rodan editorial department he wrote further Science fiction novels which had no similarities in terms of content. Among this are the short series Krieg der Milchstraßen (war of the milky ways) with six novels and Der lange Weg zur Erde (the long way to earth) with five novels (both at Terra novels).

After the death of William Voltz and the resignation of Thomas Ziegler, Klaus Mahn wrote the memorandums from 1985 (magazine 1250) together with Ernst Vlcek. After his surprising death, Robert Feldhoff took over this job.

== Utopia ==
- 042: Ringed Planet in the NGC 3031 (1960, Moewig)
- 061: Time Like Sand (1960, Pabel)
- 072: The Fog Devours Them All (1960, Moewig, ISBN 3-8118-5018-0)
- 228: Vulcan versus Earth (1960, Pabel)

== Terra ==
- 119: Palin's Creatures (1960, Moewig)
- 129: 110,000 Years Later (1960, Moewig)

== Perry Rhodan ==
- 0146: Behind the Time Wall (1964, Moewig, ISBN 978-3-8453-0145-7)
