= Michael Connors =

Michael or Mike Connors may refer to:

- Mike Connors (vaudevillian) (1891–1949), American-Australian radio presenter
- Mike Connors (1925–2017), American actor
- Michael Connors (mayor) on List of mayors of Holyoke, Massachusetts

== See also ==
- Michael Connor (disambiguation)
