= Kurt Brand =

German science fiction writer

- Born: 10 May 1917; Barmen, Wuppertal, Germany
- Died: 8 November 1991 (aged 74); Kaltern, Italy
- Occupation: Writer

Kurt Brand (10 May 1917 in Barmen – 8 November 1991 in Kaltern) was a German science fiction writer. He wrote 19 science fiction novels between 1946 and 1959, and from 1961 to 1966 he wrote almost forty Perry Rhodan stories. He also wrote novels outside the science fiction genre. He died in 1991, in Kaltern, Italy.

== Publications ==
- The Sinister Power (1978)
- Volunteers for Frago (1978)
- Peril Unlimited (1979)
- Blitzkrieg Galactica (1979)

=== Perry Rhodan series ===
- 0148: Leap into the Intercosmos (1964, Moewig, ISBN 978-3-8453-0147-1)
- SOS: Spaceship Titan! (1973)
- Project Earthsave (1974)
- Shadow of the Mutant Master (1974)
- Pucky's Greatest Hour (1975)
- Power's Price (1976)
- Unleashed Powers (1976)
- Caller from Eternity (1976)
- The Man with Two Faces (1976)
