= Terry Jernigan =

American neuroscientist

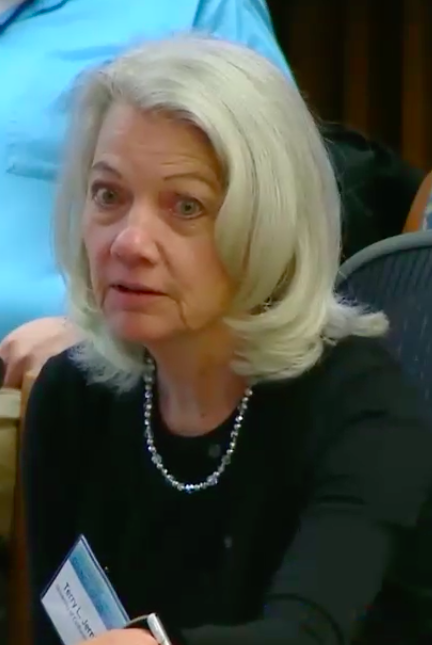
- Jernigan in January 2018
- Born: 1951 or 1952 (age 74–75)

Academic background
- Education: University of California, Irvine BS; University of California, Los Angeles Ph.D.
- Thesis: Cerebral atrophy and cognitive decline in the normal aged (1979)

Academic work
- Discipline: Neuropsychologist
- Institutions: University of California, San Diego

Terry Lynne Jernigan (1951 or 1952 (age 74–75)) is a neuropsychologist and the director of the Center for Human Development at University of California, San Diego.

== Education ==
Jernigan graduated from University of California, Irvine with a bachelor's degree before earning a doctorate from University of California, Los Angeles. She interned and completed her postdoctoral research at Stanford University and Palo Alto VA Medical Center.

== Career ==
In 1984, Jernigan joined the faculty at University of California, San Diego where she is currently a professor of Cognitive Science, Psychiatry, and Radiology. She serves on the advisory council of the National Institutes of Health. She is the national co-director of the Adolescent Brain Cognitive Development (ABCD) Study.
