= I Am a Barbarian =

1967 novel by Edgar Rice Burroughs

- Dust-jacket from the first edition
- Author: Edgar Rice Burroughs
- Illustrator: Jeff Jones (frontispiece)
- Cover artist: Jeff Jones
- Language: English
- Genre: Historical novel
- Publisher: Edgar Rice Burroughs, Inc.
- Publication date: 1967
- Publication place: United States
- Media type: Print (Hardback)
- Pages: 287 pp
- OCLC: 953364

I Am a Barbarian is a historical novel by Edgar Rice Burroughs written in 1941 but was not published until after the author's death, first appearing in hardback on September 1, 1967 published by Edgar Rice Burroughs, Inc. The book was originally to have been published by Canaveral Press. When Canaveral stopped adding titles to its catalog, Edgar Rice Burroughs, Inc. took up the project. It was the first book the firm had published since Llana of Gathol, in 1948. I Am a Barbarian is one of only two historical novels Burroughs wrote. The other, The Outlaw of Torn, set in the England of King Henry III, was published in 1927.

== Plot introduction ==
The story is pitched as a free translation of the memoirs of Britannicus, serving for 25 years as the slave of Caligula, emperor of Rome from AD 37 to 41 who is historically known for being insane. It treats a number of different supposed facets of Caligula's life, including his popular early acts as emperor and his descent into madness.

Britannicus watches as Caligula begins falsely accusing, fining and even killing individuals for the purpose of seizing their estates during a financial crisis caused by his own wasteful spending. A number of other desperate measures by Caligula are described in the book. In order to gain funds, Caligula asks the public to lend the state money. He levies taxes on lawsuits, marriage and prostitution, and begins auctioning the lives of the gladiators at shows.

The novel also includes the famous story that once, at some games at which he was presiding, he ordered his guards to throw an entire section of the crowd into the arena during intermission to be eaten by animals, because there were no criminals to be prosecuted and he was bored.
