= Robert Lory =

US speculative fiction writer

- Born: December 29, 1936 (age 89); Troy, New York, US
- Education: Harpur College
- Occupation: Writer
- Writing career
- Period: 1963-Present

Robert Lory (born December 29, 1936) is an American writer of speculative fiction, predominantly known for the Horrorscope, Shamryke Odell, Return of Dracula, and Trovo fiction series. Also contributed to the John Eagle Expeditor series of novels, writing under the Pyramid Books house name Paul Edwards. Received a BA from Harpur College in 1961, and attended the Famous Writers School in 1964. Worked for the Exxon Corporation as a public relations advisor from 1967, and served as editor of the Esso Manhattan, Exxon Manhattan, and the Esso Eastern Review.

== Select Bibliography ==
=== The Return of Dracula ===
- Dracula Returns (1973)
- The Hand of Dracula (1973)
- Dracula's Brothers (1973)
- Dracula's Gold (1973)
- The Drums of Dracula (1974)
- The Witching of Dracula (1974)
- Dracula's Lost World (1974)
- Dracula's Disciple (1975)
- Challenge to Dracula (1975)

=== Horrorscope ===
- The Green Flames of Aries (1974)
- The Revenge of Taurus (1974)
- The Curse of Leo (1974)
- Gemini Smile, Gemini Kill (1975)
- The Virgo Crypt (1975)
- Claws of the Crab (unknown)

=== Shamryke Odell ===
- Masters of the Lamp (1970)
- The Veiled World (1972)

=== Trovo ===
- The Eyes of Bolsk (1969)
- Master of the Etrax (1970)

=== John Eagle Expeditor (as Paul Edwards) ===
- John Eagle Expeditor #3: The Laughing Death (1973)
- John Eagle Expeditor #4: The Fist of Fatima (1973)
- John Eagle Expeditor #6: The Glyphs of Gold (1974)
- John Eagle Expeditor #8: The Death Devils (1974)
- John Eagle Expeditor #10: The Holocaust Action (1975)

=== Standalone Novels ===
- Identity Seven (1974)
- The Thirteen Bracelets (1974)
- Ragnarok! (2014)
