= The Rim of Space =

1961 novel by A. Bertram Chandler

- First edition
- Author: A. Bertram Chandler
- Cover artist: Ed Emshwiller
- Language: English
- Series: Rim Worlds
- Genre: science fiction
- Publisher: Avalon Books, New York
- Publication date: 1961
- Publication place: Australia
- Media type: Print
- Pages: 220 pp
- Preceded by: –
- Followed by: Bring Back Yesterday

The Rim of Space (1961) is the debut science fiction novel by Anglo-Australian author A. Bertram Chandler. The novel forms a part of the author's "Rim Worlds" series of stories.

== Plot outline ==
The novel follows the adventures of Derek Calver, one of Chandler's early major characters. The novel sees Calver joining up with the Rim Runners in order to undertake an exploration of desolate planets. He joins the crew of Lorn Lady and accompanies it to various planets on the Galactic Rim.

== Reception ==
Floyd C. Gale of Galaxy Science Fiction in 1961 rated The Rim of Space 3.5 stars out of five, stating that "All the elements of the salty sea are in Chandler's deep space thriller ... Art it may not be, but likable it certainly is". Mark Yon of SFFWorld noted in 2016 the dated sexism of the book but found: "This was a book that rose above its rather low expectations. Expecting fast-paced, low quality pulp fiction, I was surprised how contemplative and well thought out the book was. It’s a great read, which, although typically 1950’s pulp and thus unlikely to blaze a trail through SF fiction, is entertaining enough to hold interest and make me want me to read more. Surprisingly reminiscent of early Poul Anderson for its literacy and often melancholic mood, this is an old gem that’s worth a read."

== See also ==
- 1961 in Australian literature

== Notes ==
An early version of this novel was published in the January 1959 of Astounding Science Fiction as a novella under the title "To Run the Rim".

Dedication: "To Susan, who belongs on the Rim".
