= Star Rangers (novel) =

1953 novel by Andre Norton

- First edition cover
- Author: Andre Norton
- Cover artist: Richard Powers
- Language: English
- Series: Central Control
- Genre: Science fiction
- Published: 1953 (Harcourt, Brace & Company)
- Publication place: United States
- Media type: Print (Hardback)
- Pages: 280 (Hardback edition)
- ISBN: 978-0152794262
- OCLC: 586596

Star Rangers, also known as The Last Planet, is a science fiction novel by the American author Andre Norton. The novel was published on August 20, 1953, by Harcourt, Brace & Company. This is one of Norton's Central Control books, which lay out the history of a galactic empire through events suggested by Norton's understanding of Terran history (see also Star Guard).

== Background ==
The First Galactic Empire is disintegrating, and petty tyrants are creating their own fiefdoms. Near the Empire's edge, a Central Control agent seeks to rid himself of the Stellar Patrol, the last protector of law and order in the empire, by sending it out to locate lost stellar systems. Ships are sent to retrieve and align these systems under the benign rule of Central Control. The ship at the heart of the story is the Scout ship Starfire.

Living among the humans are several kinds of aliens. For example, there are the "Bemmies", whose name comes from BEM (short for Bug-Eyed Monster). The types of aliens in the story include the Zacathans, reptilian people from the planet Zacath; the Trystians, a bird people, clad in feathers and very light and nimble; the Faltharians, who come from dusky Falthar and are sensitive to light; and the Ageratans, humanoids from Agerat who are the Romans of the First Galactic Empire. (The term "Ageratan" must be from a recently revised text; in editions published through the 1970s these people were Arcturians, humans from Arcturus Three.)

== Synopsis ==
In the year AD 8054, the Stellar Patrol Scoutship Starfire has crashed in a desert on an Earth-like planet. The planet's atmosphere, gravity, and solar radiation are almost ideal for the Rangers and Patrolmen. On initial examination, there are no signs of civilization. After burying their dead, the survivors set up a camp in a forest beside a river.

One night, one of the men notices the bright beam of a beacon sweeping across the sky. Ranger Sergeant Kartr and Ranger Rolth take the aerial sled to investigate. They find an abandoned city lit up as if it were inhabited. There they meet Joyd Cummi, an Ageratan Vice-Sector Lord who has come to the city with almost two hundred people from a starliner that has made an emergency landing nearby.

Against Kartr's advice, the Patrol's ranking officer decides that the Patrolmen and Rangers will move to the city and join the other refugees. Not trusting Cummi, the Rangers take up residence in a tower isolated from the buildings occupied by the starliner's passengers and crew. Soon Kartr and the others discover that all is not well in the Cummi dictatorship.

Inspired by the arrival of the Patrol, the rebels begin their revolt, and the Rangers are drawn into the battle. With their expertise, the Patrolmen and Rangers help the rebels win the fight. Cummi flees the city, taking telepathic control of Kartr's body and using him to fly the Rangers' aerial sled.

Kartr wakes up on the ground in a rainstorm. The surviving Patrolmen and Rangers soon find him and take him to their new camp. Several days later, Kartr and his Zacathan friend search for Cummi, beginning at the wreckage of the sled. In the wilderness, they rescue an injured native boy and take him to his clan's camp, where Kartr must confront Cummi. In a mind-to-mind battle, Cummi succumbs to the hideous disease, a type of deadly fever called emfire, that he has spread to the natives. The Starfire's crew were immunized, but the natives were not so fortunate.

Kartr and the other refugees decide to avoid the natives, lest they spread even more disease. With nothing else to do and faint hope of finding an intact spaceship, they set out to find the Meeting Place of the Gods that the native boy mentioned to Kartr. When they come to that sacred place, they see a building that looks exactly like the Place of Free Planets in the Imperial capital, but much older. Inside the building, they find the legendary, almost mythical Hall of Leave-Taking and realize that the planet on which they stand is Terra of Sol, old Earth, the original home of humanity.

As they marvel at the discovery, a band of refugees from a Stellar Patrol base which was destroyed by pirates joins them. As ranking officer, Kartr asks for a vote on whether to return to the city or try to live in the wilderness. The people vote unanimously for a new start, and Kartr leads them into their future.

== Reviews ==
The editors at The Magazine of Fantasy and Science Fiction (November 1953), wrote:

A magnificent success, both in romance and wonder. An engrossing adventure that is skillfully set on a small stage against the massive background of intergalactic intrigue and decadence.

== Sources ==
- Clute, John. "Norton, Andre." The Encyclopedia of Science Fiction. Eds. John Clute, David Langford, Peter Nicholls and Graham Sleight. Gollancz, March 8, 2015. Web. March 26, 2015
- Tuck, Donald H. (1974). The Encyclopedia of Science Fiction and Fantasy. Chicago: Advent. pg. 332. ISBN 0-911682-20-1.
