= The Outlaw of Torn =

Historical novel

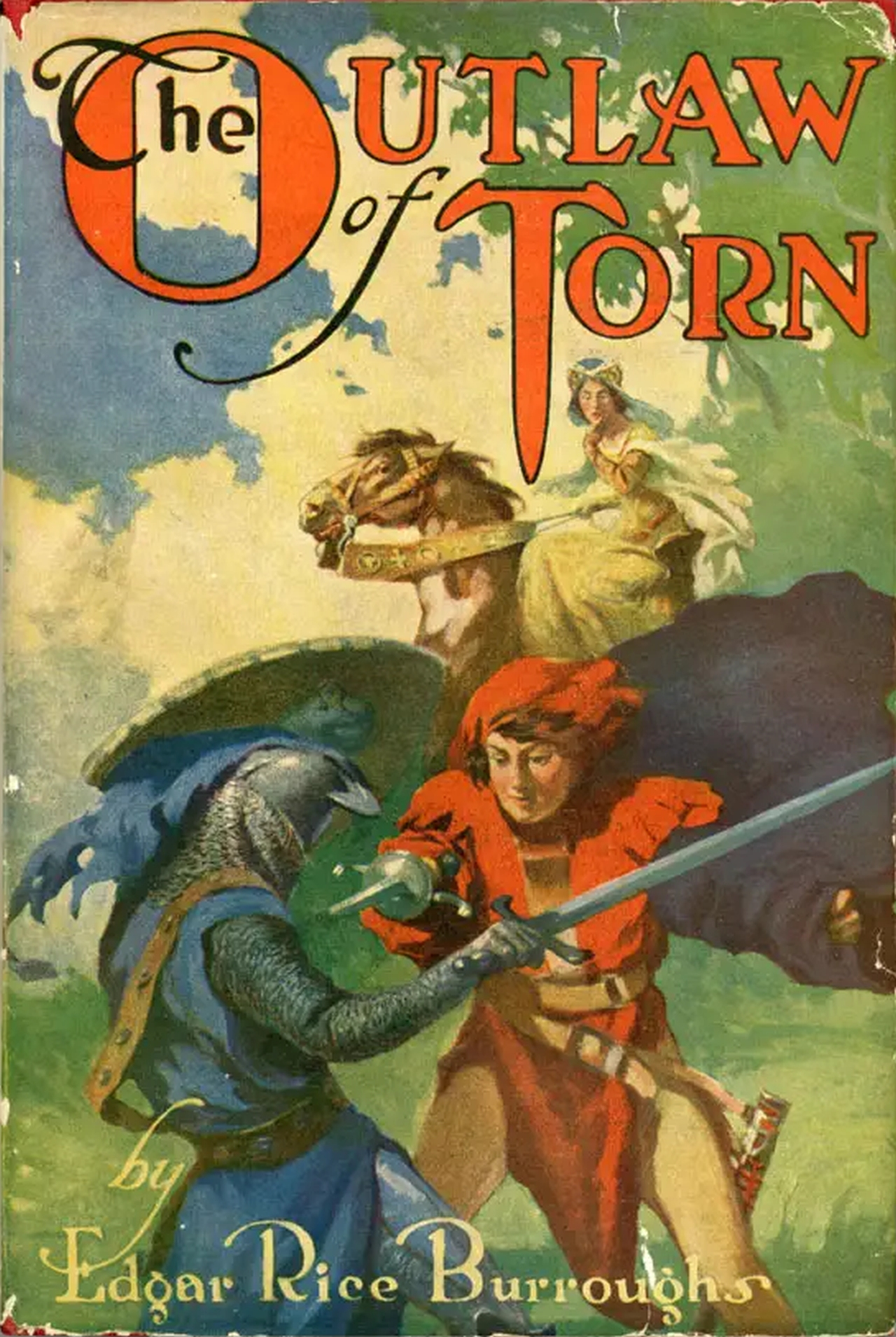
- Dust jacket from the first edition of The Outlaw of Torn
- Author: Edgar Rice Burroughs
- Cover artist: J. Allen St. John
- Language: English
- Genre: Historical novel
- Publisher: A. C. McClurg
- Publication date: 1927
- Publication place: United States
- Media type: Print (Hardback)
- Pages: 298 pp (hardback edition)

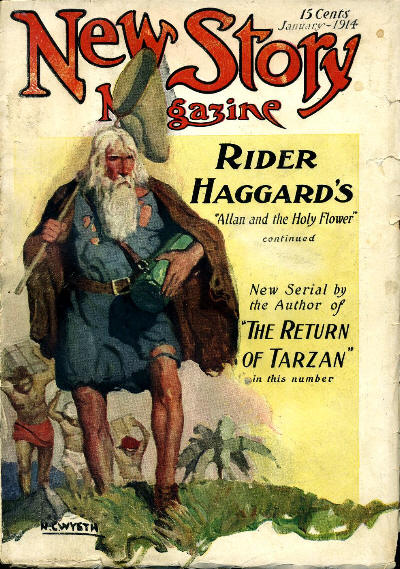
The Outlaw of Torn took second place to an H. Rider Haggard novel on its first magazine publication.

The Outlaw of Torn is a historical novel by Edgar Rice Burroughs, taking place in 13th century England. The novel is primarily set during the Second Barons' War (1264-1267). An adolescent outlaw joins the war on the side of the rebel leader Simon de Montfort and is romantically interested in de Montfort's daughter. The outlaw soon learns that he is a lookalike of the heir apparent Prince Edward (the future king Edward I), and eventually realizes that he is a long-lost son of Henry III of England. Prince Edward is the outlaw's brother, which explains why they resemble each other.

Originally published as a five-part serial in New Story Magazine from January to May 1914, and first published in book form by A. C. McClurg in 1927. It was Burroughs' second novel, his first being the science fiction work A Princess of Mars. His third was Tarzan of the Apes.

The Outlaw of Torn is one of only two historical novels Burroughs wrote. The other, I Am a Barbarian, set in the Rome of Caligula, was not published until 1967, seventeen years after his death.

== Plot summary ==
The story is set in 13th-century England and concerns the fictional outlaw Norman of Torn, who purportedly harried the country during the power struggle between King Henry III and Simon de Montfort. Norman is the supposed son of the Frenchman de Vac, once the king's fencing master, who has a grudge against his former employer and raises the boy to be a simple, brutal killing machine with a hatred of all things English. His intentions are partially subverted by a priest who befriends Norman and teaches him his letters and chivalry towards women.

Otherwise, all goes according to plan. By 17, Norman is the best swordsman in all of England; by the age of 18, he has a large bounty on his head, and by the age of 19, he leads the largest band of thieves in all of England. None can catch or best him. In his hatred for the king, Norman even becomes involved in the Second Barons' War (1264-1267), which turns the tide in favour of de Montfort. In another guise, that of Roger de Conde, he becomes involved with de Montfort's daughter Bertrade, defending her against her and her father's enemies. She notes in him a curious resemblance to the king's son and heir Prince Edward.

Finally brought to bay in a confrontation with both King Henry and de Montfort, Norman is brought down by the treachery of de Vac, who appears to kill him, though at the cost of his own life. As de Vac dies, he reveals that Norman is in fact Richard, long-lost son of King Henry and Queen Eleanor and brother to Prince Edward. The fencing master had kidnapped the prince as a child to serve as the vehicle of his vengeance against the king. Luckily, Norman/Richard turns out not to be truly dead, surviving to be reconciled to his true father and attain the hand of Bertrade.

== Historical allusions ==
While Prince Richard is fictional, a son of that name was attributed to Henry and Eleanor during the Middle Ages, though there is reason to doubt his actual existence. Richard, together with two equally suspect brothers John and Henry, are known only from a 14th-century addition made to a manuscript of Flores Historiarum, and are nowhere contemporaneously recorded.

The historical Simon de Montfort, on whom the character in Burroughs' novel was based did have a daughter, but her name was Eleanor, not Bertrade. She was still a child when her father died, and she married Llywelyn ap Gruffudd, Prince of the Gwynedd, not the fictional Prince Richard of England of Burroughs' story. There was a real Bertrade de Montfort, daughter of Simon I of Montfort, who married Philip I of France; she, however, died more than a century before the events of this tale.

== Copyright ==
The copyright for this story has expired in the United States, and thus now resides in the public domain there. The text is available via Project Gutenberg.
