= Walter Ernsting =

German writer (1920–2005)

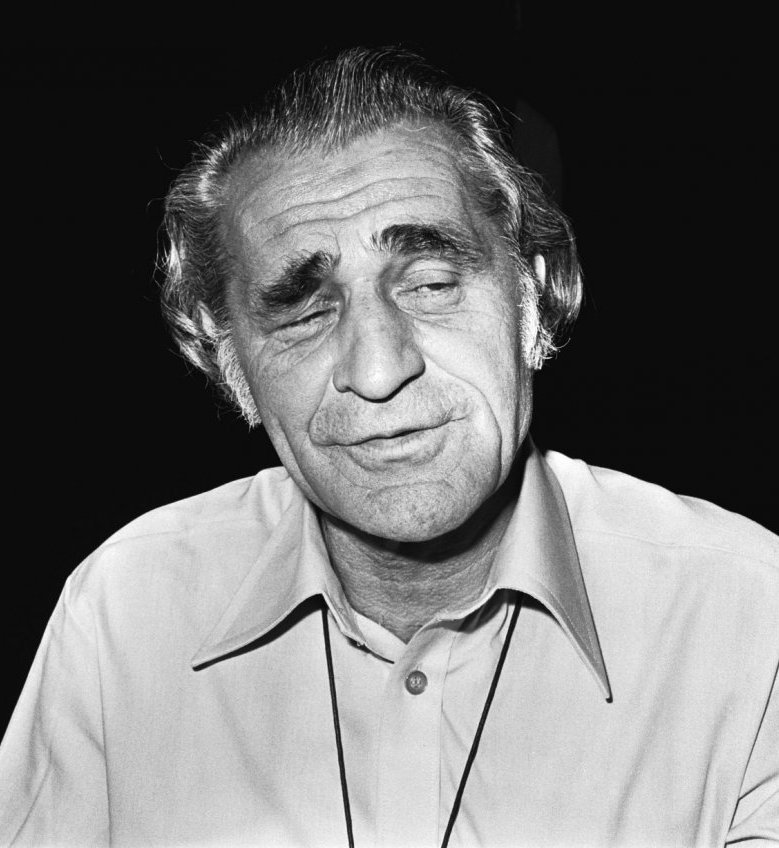
- Walter Ernsting in 1978
- Born: 13 June 1920; Koblenz, Germany
- Died: 15 January 2005 (aged 84); Salzburg, Austria
- Other name: Clark Darlton
- Occupation: Science fiction author

Walter Ernsting (13 June 1920 – 15 January 2005) was a German science fiction and fantasy author who mainly published under the pseudonym Clark Darlton. He grew up in Koblenz and was drafted into the German Wehrmacht shortly after the beginning of World War II. He served in an intelligence unit in Norway and on the Eastern Front, where he was captured and spent several years as a prisoner of war in Siberia.

After returning to Germany, Ernsting started to work as a translator for the British authorities in 1952 and came into contact with Anglo-American science fiction magazines. Intrigued with this literary genre, he started working on some science fiction novels of his own, but Germany's cultural climate was apparently not ready for native science fiction authors. Ernsting finally managed to get some of his novels published by inventing a fictitious British author, Clark Darlton, and selling his own works as translations of Darlton's works. His first novel, Ufo am Nachthimmel, was published in 1955 as issue 19 of Utopia Großband.

Ernsting published several novels under the Darlton pseudonym, and on 4 August 1955, together with other science fiction authors, founded the Science Fiction Club Deutschland (SFCD). Until the end of the 1960s, Ernsting worked as an editor for the club's magazine, Andromeda, and became an important figure in German science fiction fandom.

Over the course of his lifetime, Ernsting wrote more than 300 science fiction novels. Asteroid 15265, discovered in 1990, was named after Ernsting in 2003.

== Utopia and Terra ==
Ernsting started his science fiction career in 1954 as translator for the new science fiction novel collection Utopia Großband of the publishing house Erich Pabel Verlag, Rastatt. In 1955 he got to be editor of this collection and started the readers' column Meteoriten; he also got to be editor of the new science fiction magazine Utopia Sonderband (later renamed to Utopia Magazin).

In 1958 he changed to the publishing house Moewig Verlag, Munich and its series for science fiction novels Terra and its magazine Galaxis. He still wrote science fiction novels and stories using the pseudonyms Clark Darlton and occasionally Fred McPatterson.

== Perry Rhodan ==
In 1961, Ernsting, his colleague K. H. Scheer and other authors invented what would become the most successful German science fiction series, Perry Rhodan. There has been some debate as to which parts of the series' concept were created by whom, but it seems certain that the name of the main protagonist and many of his character traits were developed by Ernsting. Ernsting also invented a number of alien races and many of the series' supporting characters. He stayed with the series until issue 1622, which was published in 1992.

== Science fiction ==
- The Clark Darlton Reader (1983, Moewig, ISBN 3-8118-3612-9)

== External links and references ==
- Walter Ernsting on Perrypedia (in German)
- Walter Ernsting on the official Perry Rhodan website (in German)
- Clark Darlton at the Internet Speculative Fiction Database
- http://jophan.org/1960s/chapter4.htm // about sf fandom in some countries including Germany
- https://web.archive.org/web/20060331082459/http://www.sueddeutsche.de/,kulm1/kultur/artikel/226/46180/ // article (in German)
- http://www.fandomobserver.de/pdf/188.pdf // obituary with biography (in German)
- Heinz J. Galle: Volksbuecher und Heftromane, 1998, ISBN 3-932621-09-3, ISSN 0934-1463 (in German)
- Clark Darlton: Der Mann, der die Zukunft brachte, 2000, ISBN 3-8118-2098-2

Specific
