= The Stars Are Ours! =

1954 novel by Andre Norton

- First edition
- Author: Andre Norton
- Cover artist: Virgil Finlay
- Language: English
- Genre: Science fiction
- Publisher: World
- Publication date: 1954
- Publication place: United States
- Media type: Print (hardback & paperback)
- Pages: 237
- Followed by: Star Born

The Stars Are Ours! is a 1954 science fiction novel by American writer Andre Norton. It describes the first interstellar voyage, undertaken to escape the tyranny that rules the Earth. Norton wrote a sequel, Star Born, which was published in 1957.

== Plot summary ==
=== Back story ===
The Moon, Mars and Venus have been explored and found unsuitable for colonization. Back on the Earth, two very different factions compete to determine the future of humanity: the Free Scientists, who refuse to accept political, racial and religious divisions, and the nationalists. Armed men seize control of one of the space stations orbiting the planet, convert it into a weapon, and (perhaps accidentally) devastate most of the world's heavily populated areas.

A fanatic named Arturo Renzi rises up, blaming the catastrophe on the scientists and "techneers" while advocating a return to a simpler, less technological life. When he is assassinated, the Free Scientists are hunted down. Within a period of three days, most are killed; the few remaining survivors are either enslaved by the ruling Peacemen of the Company of Pax or go into hiding, to be tracked down one over the years. Society is structured into three classes, the Peacemen nobility and their landsmen overseers, a vast peasantry, and the work-slaves, composed of actual or suspected scientists. Most technology is rejected and civilization regresses.

=== In hiding ===
Chemist Lars Nordis, his daughter Dessie, and her younger brother Dard escape the great purge (though Lars was crippled as a result) and find refuge on a small farm. There, Lars continues his research and maintains contact with an underground network of scientists.

One day, Lars finishes his work and notifies his contacts. As a precaution, he makes Dard and Dessie memorize what seems to them to be meaningless words and patterns. But before they can be taken to the stronghold of the scientists, the suspicious local landsman, Hew Folley, calls in the Peacemen to raid their home. Dard and Dessie escape, but Lars is killed.

Dard contacts Sach, an agent of the scientists, who agrees to guide them to the underground's last refuge. There, Dard learns that the scientists and their supporters are feverishly building a starship to escape deep space. They desperately need what Lars was working on: suspended animation, without which their journey - which will last several years - would not be possible. The information that Dard and Dessie had memorized turns out to be what the scientists have been waiting for. The Peacemen, however, are closing in.

Before they can leave, there is one more task. They need to plot a course using a computer, but the only one they know of that still works is located in Pax headquarters. Dard volunteers to lead pilot-astrogator Simba Kimber to it, since he once visited the place years ago. They succeed, though they barely avoid capture, and manage to return with the calculations.

Then the Peacemen discover and attack the refuge. Fighting a desperate rearguard action, the defenders manage to hold off the Peacemen long enough to blast off. Then, trusting in Lars' invention, they set their course and undergo suspended animation.

=== Ad astra (To the stars) ===
When they awaken (though a few never do), they find themselves near a star with a hospitable planet. They land and begin to build their new colony. While exploring the surroundings, they discover a cargo container; though they detected no signs of technology from orbit, the planet may still be inhabited by an intelligent race.

Dard goes along on a scouting expedition. The explorers find the remains of a road, which leads to a war-wrecked, abandoned city. While travelling in their rocket sled, they barely survive being shot down by decrepit, automated anti-aircraft guns. The sled can barely fly, so some of the explorers have to walk back. When they return, they find a thriving settlement.

Soon afterwards, Dessie protects a "sea baby" from small flying "dragons". It turns out that the creature is intelligent. Its parents appear out of the ocean and retrieve their offspring. Seeing that the humans are friendly, their tribe or clan is soon trading goods and information. They are telepathic and can communicate with the newcomers if they hold hands. They reveal that they were once the slaves of the species that built the city. They escaped when the Others warred with each other. Now there are none of the Others left on the continent, but they still live across the sea.

But that is a problem for another day. For now, the humans have found a new home.

== Reception ==
Reviewer Groff Conklin praised the novel as a "genuinely exciting adventure," but faulted it for "an entirely unwarranted amount of cruelty and almost sadistically contrived bloodshed." Anthony Boucher characterized it as "a good adventure story" and "a pleasing travelog." P. Schuyler Miller described the novel as "a stirring adventure story in the good old mold, but told with thoroughly modern deftness and smoothness."

The book was also reviewed by Kirkus Reviews (August 1, 1954 issue), which called it "a graphic picture of a hard won trial at new life in another planetary system" and "Thoughtful."

== Sources ==
- Barron, Neil (2004). Anatomy of Wonder: A Critical Guide to Science Fiction, 5th Edition. Westport, Connecticut: Libraries Unlimited. p. 323. ISBN 1-59158-171-0.
- Tuck, Donald H. (1978). The Encyclopedia of Science Fiction and Fantasy. Chicago: Advent. p. 332. ISBN 0-911682-22-8.
