= Star Gate (novel) =

1958 science fantasy novel by Andre Norton

- First edition cover
- Author: Andre Norton
- Cover artist: Richard Powers
- Language: English
- Genre: Science fantasy
- Published: 1958 by Harcourt, Brace & Company
- Publication place: United States
- Media type: Print (Hardcover)
- Pages: 192 (Hardback edition)
- OCLC: 586718
- Dewey Decimal: 813.52
- LC Class: PS3527.O632

Star Gate is a science fantasy novel by American writer Andre Norton, published by Harcourt, Brace & Company in 1958. The story is science fiction with a blend of sword and sorcery, mingling technologically advanced humans from Earth with the human natives of the far-off world of Gorth and a native culture that has achieved the development level of medieval Europe.

== Premise ==
In her prologue, Norton postulated a mechanism that enables people to travel between alternate versions of the same world and even meet alternate versions of themselves. This appears to be based on the Everett interpretation of quantum mechanics (Many-worlds interpretation), published the year before the first edition.

== Plot ==
Long ago people came from beyond the sky and landed on Gorth. There they raised the human natives out of the wild state and led them to develop a civilization analogous to that of medieval Europe. Then they went away, leaving behind a few of their number, memories, and a small population of cross-breeds. Kincar s’Rud is one of those cross-breeds. Part native and part Star Lord, he has assumed that he will inherit the throne of a small fief when his grandfather dies. Instead, his grandfather bestows upon him the livery of a Star Lord and warns him to leave Styr Holding immediately, because his uncle intends to kill him in order to take the throne for himself.

Riding his larng Cim, the four-eyed analogue of a horse, and accompanied by his pterodactyl-like hunting mord, Vorken, he leaves the only world he has known, following a map that his grandfather gave him. Falling in with a party of cross-breeds and a Star Lord, he helps them fight off outlaws and follows them through a pair of luminous webs to another Gorth. As they pass through the Star Gate Kincar is burned by an amulet, a Tie, that he wears. Joined by others, the group takes refuge in an abandoned keep that they find on their new world. Kincar meets a healer, Lady Asgar, who treats his burn while Lord Dillan tells him about many worlds and travel between them. They have come to a Gorth that they had not intended to occupy, so they will have to build another Star Gate.

While out hunting, Kincar captures a small man who was trying to steal his kill. Back at the keep the man reacts to the Star Lords’ presence with fear, telling the refugees that the Star Lords he knows, the Dark Ones, are cruel people who have enslaved the native Gorthians. One of the Dark Ones is Rud, a doppelgänger of Kincar’s father.

Kincar volunteers to reconnoiter the lands occupied by the Dark Ones and their slaves. Before he can even reach the city where he would spy out what the refugees need to know, he is captured and taken to an open field to be eaten alive by mords. The Tie burns the thug who tries to take it and the mords finish him off while Vorken, who has become leader of the flock, protects Kincar.

Astounded by Kincar’s survival, the evil Lords Rud and Dillan take him and Vorken to the place where their starships stand grounded. Desperate, putting his faith in the Tie, Kincar escapes and goes back to the mountains to meet up again with the refugees and the bastard son of this Gorth’s Rud.

In the aircar that Kincar used in his escape, the Star Lords go to the starships on a day when all of the Dark Lords will be in them. They set the automatic controls and send the ships back into space, thereby ending the cruel dictatorship of the Dark Ones. The Star Lords then use materials that they took from the ships to build another Star Gate and they, Kincar, and the other refugees pass through it into yet another alternate Gorth.

== Publication history ==
- 1958, USA, Harcourt, Brace & Company, Pub date 1958 Aug 20, Hardback (192 pp)
- 1958, Canada, Longmans, Pub date Oct 1958, Hardback (192 pp)
- 1963, USA, Ace Books (#F-231), Paperback (190 pp)
- 1963, USA, Harcourt, Brace & World, Hardback (192 pp)
- 1967, USA, Ace Books (#M-157), Paperback (190 pp)
- 1970, UK, Gollancz, ISBN 0-575-00396-0, Pub date Mar 1970, Hardback (192 pp)
- 1973, Germany, Pabel Verlag (Pabel TB 216), OCLC 74175641, Paperback (159 pp), as “Blut der Sternengötter (Blood of the Star Gods)
- 1974, USA, Ace Books (#78072), Pub date Feb 1974, Paperback (188 pp)
- 1977, USA, Ace Books (#78073), Pub date Mar 1977, Paperback (188 pp)
- 1980, USA, Fawcett Crest, ISBN 0-449-24276-5, Pub date Mar 1980, Paperback (223 pp)
- 1983, USA, Del Rey/Ballantine, ISBN 0-345-31193-0, Pub date Dec 1983, Paperback (223 pp)
- 1983, Canada, Del Rey/Ballantine, ISBN 0-345-31193-0, Pub date Dec 1983, Paperback (223 pp)
- 1987, UK, Victor Gollancz Science Fiction, ISBN 0-575-04007-6, Pub date Jul 1987, Paperback (192 pp)

== Sources ==
- Schlobin, Roger C. & Irene R. Harrison, "Andre Norton: a primary and secondary bibliography", 1994, NESFA Press (Framingham, MA), ISBN 0-915368-64-1, Pg 5
- Tuck, Donald H. (1974). The Encyclopedia of Science Fiction and Fantasy. Chicago: Advent. pg. 331. ISBN 0-911682-20-1.
