= Star Guard =

1955 novel by Andre Norton

- First edition cover
- Author: Andre Norton
- Cover artist: Richard M. Powers
- Language: English
- Genre: Science fiction
- Published: 1955
- Publisher: Harcourt, Brace & Company
- Publication place: United States
- Media type: Print (hardcover)
- Pages: 247 pp (Hardcover; 1st edition)

Star Guard is a science fiction novel by American writer Andre Norton, published in 1955 by Harcourt, Brace & Company. It is an example of military science fiction, based on European ancient history.

== Plot introduction ==
Information given in the story indicates that humanity only developed space travel far enough to attract the attention of Central Control in the 37th century AD. Norton explains the implied retardation of human development through references to nuclear wars, which presumably caused so much destruction that civilization took an extra sixteen or seventeen centuries to achieve a level of development suitable for resuming humanity's reach for the stars.

Presented in the guise of a history lecture at an alien university, Norton's introduction explains that in the 40th century the people of Terra (the Latin name having replaced the Anglo-Saxon Earth) can only go to the stars as mercenaries. On alien worlds Terrans fight brushfire wars and thereby help Central Control maintain peace within its vast interstellar empire. Archs, armed with relatively primitive weapons, are organized into Hordes, which fight on underdeveloped barbarian planets, and Mechs, who use more modern weapons, are organized into Legions, which fight on advanced, civilized worlds. But then a Horde fighting on the primitive planet Fronn encounters a Legion of Mechs.

== Plot summary ==
In the year 3956 AD. Kana Karr, Arch Swordsman, Third Class, newly graduated from combat training, has come to Prime to obtain his first assignment. He signs up to join Yorke's Horde, which is headed for action on the planet Fronn. In the library adjacent to the Hiring Hall he checks out a record-pak, takes it into a booth, and goes into an induced sleep while the mechanism impresses all that is known of Fronn directly into his brain. As he leaves the library he notices, reflected in a polished surface, a Mech taking the record-pak off the return conveyor, which is strange because the Mech are not allowed to go to Fronn.

On the troop ship to Secundus Kana shares a cabin with Swordtan Trig Hansu, who seems pleased that Kana has had special training in extraterrestrial contact. From Secundus Yorke's Horde proceeds to Fronn, where Kana is paired with Deke Mills, a veteran close to being promoted to Swordtan. While the Horde is marching to meet their employer, a Llor prince contending for the throne of a kingdom, Kana and another swordsman detect a spy hidden in a caravan of Venturi merchants. Kana and his companion are obliged to shoot the spy dead when they see that he is armed with a flamer, a Mech weapon that is absolutely forbidden on Fronn.

In their first battle the Terran combatants see the prince who hired them killed by a flamer. Uncertain that they have safe passage back to the spaceport at Tharc, Yorke marches his men along the mountain front to camp by a river. At a meeting with Mech officers and a Galactic Agent, Yorke, two of his top Swordtans, and Deke Mills are burned down by flamers. Mills survives his burns long enough to summon Kana and tell him what happened. Told of the treachery, Hansu takes command of the Horde and leads it, stripped to its bare essentials, into the mountains.

In the mountains the Horde encounters the Cos, a people similar to the Llor but physically smaller. At first the Horde must bypass various booby traps, but then the Cos attack. The Horde fights back and conquers a Cos fortress. Then the Cos melt away and the Horde meets no further resistance as it marches through the mountains, across a wide valley, and over a range of coastal mountains.

The adventures of York's horde on Fronn until they get away from the Llor are based on The Anabasis of Xenophon.

As they cross the valley the Terrans become aware that the Llor have declared war upon the amphibious Venturi. Because the Horde has rescued several Venturi from Llor captors, the Terrans find that the Venturi are willing to give them some help. As they have always done when the pogroms start, the Venturi abandon the continents and retreat to their islands, where the Llor cannot follow, so they invite the Horde to occupy the small port that they have just abandoned. The Horde moves into its new quarters just as Fronn enters the season of nearly constant hurricane-force winds.

During a lull in the winds the Archs find the wreckage of a six-man crawler, a small, tank-like vehicle, that was carrying Mech weapons to an unknown receiver. This discovery implies the existence of a ship nearby and the Venturi tell Hansu where to find it. After sending the rest of the Horde to stay with the Venturi on one of their islands, Hansu takes Kana and several other men to find the ship. After several days of riding the Fronnian equivalent of camels, the men arrive at the ship just in time to see a squad of Mechs and their Llor helpers finish setting up a disturbing tableau around what turns out to be a Galactic Patrol vessel.

With the stolen ship emptied of its cargo of weapons, the Mechs lay out the bodies of half a dozen Patrolmen who had been shot with Arch rifles. An alien among them takes pictures, clearly intending to blame Yorke's Horde for an atrocity against the most respected institution in the galaxy. Once the Mechs and their Llor helpers leave, Hansu takes his men down into the scene and they give the Patrolmen a proper burial. They find that the ship, appearing to have been looted, is still spaceworthy, so the four men strap themselves into the acceleration seats and the Horde's engineer lifts them into space, setting course for Terra. The men need to get their message of betrayal to Deputy-Commander Matthias.

As they approach Terra the men must resort to using the ship's lifeboats, Hansu and Kana taking one and the other two men another. Hansu and Kana land close enough to Prime that they can get there in a hopper stolen from an automated agricultural depot. They infer, correctly, that they are being hunted by highly placed authorities and they take appropriate evasive actions, even entering Prime through one of the old subway tunnels from before the nuclear wars. In spite of their caution, they are captured.

Interrogated under drugs, Kana tells his interrogators all what happened on Fronn. Nonetheless, he is convicted of several serious charges and sentenced to life in a labor camp. Later, seizing an opportunity, he escapes, but is soon recaptured. This time, though, he is taken to an underground room on the outskirts of Prime, where he sees Hansu and Matthias waiting for him. The sentencing had been a scam, worked for the benefit of the Galactic Agent who had been present. Now Kana can go to the stars as a free man, to settle on one of the worlds that Terrans have been secretly colonizing for ten generations.
