= K. H. Scheer =

German writer (1928–1991)

Karl-Herbert Scheer (19 June 1928 in Harheim (now part of Frankfurt) – 15 September 1991) was a German science fiction writer, usually credited as K. H. Scheer.

Scheer was born in the Hessian town of Harheim in 1928. Towards the end of World War II he began training as a marine engineer, but the war ended before he was called to active service. After the war, he started working on science fiction novels.

His novel Stern A funkt Hilfe ("Star A sends help"), which started his successful career in German science fiction, was possibly first published in serialised form in 1948 (sources differ), but certainly in 1952 as a library edition hardcover.

Scheer created the science fiction series "ZbV", which ran from 1957 to 1980. In 1960 he joined forces with Walter Ernsting (under the pen name Clark Dalton). Together, they developed the Perry Rhodan series, which has since become the world's largest science fiction series, with uninterrupted weekly publication of a new novel/novella since Unternehmen Stardust in 1961, and a circulation exceeding 1.5 billion volumes. Scheer wrote over 70 of the novels in the series, as well as the synopses for the first ca. 650 volumes, before passing on the role as lead author to William Voltz. He also developed the concept for Perry Rhodan's sibling series Atlan, which published 850 instalments between 1969 and 1988.

In the 1970s, health issues caused him to withdraw from Perry Rhodan, but continued to work on other projects. He returned to his biggest creation in the 1980s. Scheer died in 1991 at the age of 63 in Friedrichsdorf.

== Utopia ==
- 11: Expedition (1961, Balowa)
- 16: The Big Ones in the Depths (1961, Balowa)
