= List of Ace SF numeric-series single titles =

List of science fiction books

Ace Books have published hundreds of science fiction titles, starting in 1953. Many of these were Ace Doubles (dos-à-dos format), but they also published many single volumes. Between 1953 and 1968, the books had a letter-series identifier; after that date they were given five digit numeric serial numbers. There are 693 numeric-series sf titles in the list below, but the list is very incomplete.

The list given here gives a date of publication; in all cases this refers to the date of publication by Ace, and not the date of original publication of the novels. For more information about the history of these titles, see Ace Books, which includes a discussion of the serial numbering conventions used and an explanation of the letter-code system.

- 00075 SF John Jakes When the Star Kings Die
- 00078 SF Peter George (as Peter Bryant) Red Alert
- 00078 SF R.A. Salvatore The Dragons Dagger
- 00092 SF John Macklin Dwellers in Darkness
- 00093 SF Fred Saberhagen The Black Mountains
- 00094 SF Leigh Brackett The Big Jump
- 00104 SF Mack Reynolds Section G: United Planets
- 00106 SF John Macklin Passport to the Unknown
- 00107 SF James White The Secret Visitors
- 00108 SF Roger Zelazny Four For Tomorrow
- 00109 SF Mark S. Geston Lords of the Starship
- 00110 SF Fritz Leiber Swords in the Mist
- 00111 SF John W. Campbell Invaders from the Infinite
- 00119 SF William Shatner Teksecret
- 00125 SF Mary Staton From the Legend of Biel
- 00142 SF Steve Perry The Forever Drug (1995)
- 00153 SF Fritz Leiber Swords Against Wizardry
- 00265 SF Mack Reynolds Ability Quotient
- 00275 SF Donald A. Wollheim (ed.) Ace Science Fiction Reader (1971)
- 00289 SF William Shatner Tekpower
- 00348 SF Greg Bear Blood Music (1996)
- 00390 SF William Shatner Tekmoney
- 00950 SF Ron Goulart After Things Fell Apart (1970)
- 00958 SF Mack Reynolds After Utopia (1977)
- 01000 SF John Brunner Age of Miracles
- 01040 SF Larry Maddock Agent of T.E.R.R.A.#1: The Flying Saucer Gambit
- 01041 SF Larry Maddock Agent of T.E.R.R.A.#2: The Golden Goddess Gambit
- 01042 SF Larry Maddock Agent of T.E.R.R.A.#3: The Emerald Elephant Gambit
- 01043 SF Larry Maddock Agent of T.E.R.R.A.#4: The Time Trap Gambit
- 01066 SF Poul Anderson Agent of the Terran Empire
- 01501 SF Robert A. Heinlein The Worlds of Robert A. Heinlein
- 01570 SF Fletcher Pratt Alien Planet
- 01750 SF Robert E. Howard Almuric
- 01770 SF Leigh Brackett Alpha Centauri Or Die (1976)
- 02236 SF Stanley Schmidt (ed.) Analog Yearbook Ii
- 02268 SF Joanna Russ And Chaos Died (1970)
- 02274 SF Donald R. Bensen And Having Writ... (1978)
- 02295 SF Keith Roberts Anita (1970)
- 02320 SF Alexei Panshin Masque World
- 02380 SF Tim Powers The Anubis Gates
- 02935 SF Philip Francis Nowland Armageddon 2419 A.D.
- 02936 SF Philip Francis Nowland Armageddon 2419 A.D.
- 02938 SF Philip Francis Nowland Armageddon 2419 A.D.
- 03297 SF Jack Vance The Asutra
- 03300 SF John Brunner The Atlantic Abomination (1960)
- 03322 SF Edgar Rice Burroughs At the Earth's Core
- 03325 SF Edgar Rice Burroughs At the Earth's Core
- 03326 SF Edgar Rice Burroughs At the Earth's Core (1978)
- 03328 SF Edgar Rice Burroughs At the Earth's Core (1985)
- 04040 SF Joanna Russ Picnic on Paradise
- 04591 SF Samuel R. Delany Babel-17 (1966)
- 04592 SF Samuel R. Delany Babel-17 (1974)
- 04636 SF Edgar Rice Burroughs Back to the Stone Age
- 04722 SF Samuel R. Delany The Ballad of Beta-2
- 04760 SF Tom Purdom The Barons of Behavior (1972)
- 04860 SF A. E. van Vogt The Battle of Forever (1971)
- 05330 SF Jack London Before Adam
- 05404 SF Fred Saberhagen Berserker
- 05407 SF Fred Saberhagen Berserker Man
- 05408 SF Fred Saberhagen Berserker's Planet (1980)
- 05424 SF Fred Saberhagen Berserker Man
- 05454 SF Edward L. Ferman (ed.) The Best from Fantasy and Science Fiction, 15th Series (1966)
- 05455 SF Edward L. Ferman (ed.) The Best from Fantasy and Science Fiction, 16th Series
- 05456 SF Edward L. Ferman (ed.) The Best from Fantasy and Science Fiction, 17th Series
- 05457 SF Edward L. Ferman (ed.) The Best from Fantasy and Science Fiction, 18th Series
- 05458 SF Edward L. Ferman (ed.) The Best from Fantasy and Science Fiction, 19th Series (1973)
- 05460 SF Edward L. Ferman (ed.) The Best from Fantasy and Science Fiction: A Special 25th Anniversary Anthology
- 05461 SF Edward L. Ferman (ed.) The Best from Fantasy and Science Fiction, 22nd Series (1978)
- 05475 SF Lester Del Rey (ed.) Best Science Fiction Stories of the Year (1st Annual Collection) (1972)
- 05476 SF Lester Del Rey (ed.) Best Science Fiction Stories of the Year (2nd Annual Collection)
- 05477 SF Lester Del Rey (ed.) Best Science Fiction Stories of the Year (3rd Annual Collection) (1974)
- 05478 SF Lester Del Rey (ed.) Best Science Fiction Stories of the Year (4th Annual Collection) (1977)
- 05479 SF Lester Del Rey (ed.) Best Science Fiction Stories of the Year (5th Annual Collection) (1977)
- 05481 SF Mack Reynolds The Best Ye Breed
- 05496 SF Fred Saberhagen Berserker Man
- 05500 SF Robert A. Heinlein Between Planets
- 05586 SF John Varley The Golden Globe
- 05655 SF Edgar Rice Burroughs Beyond the Farthest Star (1973)
- 05656 SF Edgar Rice Burroughs Beyond the Farthest Star
- 05785 SF Shepherd Mead The Big Ball of Wax
- 06061 SF Leigh Brackett The Big Jump (1976)
- 06171 SF Jack Vance Big Planet (1978)
- 06177 SF Keith Laumer The Big Show
- 06530 SF Michael Moorcock The Black Corridor
- 06615 SF Fred Saberhagen The Black Mountains
- 06701 SF John W. Campbell The Black Star Passes
- 06854 SF Marion Zimmer Bradley The Bloody Sun
- 07012 SF L. Sprague de Camp and Catherine Crook De Camp The Bones of Zora
- 07162 SF John Brunner Born Under Mars
- 07180 SF Marion Zimmer Bradley The Brass Dragon
- 07200 SF Jack Vance The Brave Free Men: Book II of the Durdane Trilogy
- 07690 SF Murray Leinster The Brain-Stealers
- 07840 SF Ray Cummings A Brand New World
- 07895 SF Andre Norton Breed to Come (1973)
- 08145 SF John Rankine The Bromius Phenomenon
- 08215 SF Fred Saberhagen Brother Assassin
- 09022 SF Robert O'Riodan Cadre One
- 09037 SF Spider Robinson Callahan's Crosstime Saloon (1977)
- 09069 SF Spider Robinson Callahan's Crosstime Saloon
- 09072 SF Spider Robinson Callahan's Lady (1989)
- 09200 SF Edgar Rice Burroughs Carson of Venus (1969)
- 09203 SF Edgar Rice Burroughs Carson of Venus
- 09205 SF Edgar Rice Burroughs Carson of Venus (1982)
- 09265 SF Andre Norton Catseye
- 09281 SF Edgar Rice Burroughs The Cave Girl
- 09284 SF Edgar Rice Burroughs The Cave Girl
- 10150 SF Walt Richmond Challenge the Hellmaker
- 10258 SF Margaret St. Clair Change the Sky and Other Stories (1974)
- 10307 SF Ursula K. Le Guin City of Illusions (1967)
- 10410 SF A. E. van Vogt Children of Tomorrow
- 10411 SF A. E. van Vogt Children of Tomorrow
- 10600 SF Robert A. Heinlein Citizen of the Galaxy
- 10621 SF Clifford D. Simak City
- 10701 SF Ursula K. Le Guin City of Illusions (1967)
- 10702 SF Ursula K. Le Guin City of Illusion
- 11036 SF Philip K. Dick Clans of the Alphane Moon (1972)
- 11457 SF Robert E. Howard, L. Sprague de Camp, and Lin Carter Conan the Freebooter
- 11467 SF Robert E. Howard, Björn Nyberg, and L. Sprague de Camp Conan the Avenger (Conan#10)
- 11546 SF Leigh Brackett The Coming of the Terrans (1976)
- 11603 SF Robert E. Howard (edited by L. Sprague de Camp) Conan the Conqueror (Conan#9)
- 11622 SF Anthony Boucher The Complete Werewolf & Other Stories of Fantasy & Science Fiction (1969)
- 11630 SF Robert E. Howard, L. Sprague de Camp, and Lin Carter Conan
- 11633 SF Robert E. Howard, L. Sprague de Camp, and Lin Carter Conan: The Wanderer
- 11659 SF Andrew J. Offutt Conan: The Mercenary (1981)
- 11669 SF L. Sprague de Camp (ed.) The Spell of Conan (1980)
- 11670 SF L. Sprague de Camp (ed.) The Blade of Conan (1979)
- 11671 SF Robert E. Howard, L. Sprague de Camp, and Lin Carter Conan (1967)
- 11672 SF Robert E. Howard, L. Sprague de Camp, and Lin Carter Conan of Cimmeria
- 11673 SF Robert E. Howard, L. Sprague de Camp, and Lin Carter Conan the Freebooter
- 11674 SF Robert E. Howard, L. Sprague de Camp, and Lin Carter Conan: The Wanderer
- 11675 SF Robert E. Howard and L. Sprague de Camp Conan: The Adventurer
- 11676 SF L. Sprague de Camp and Lin Carter Conan the Buccaneer
- 11677 SF Robert E. Howard and L. Sprague de Camp Conan: The Warrior
- 11678 SF Robert E. Howard and L. Sprague de Camp Conan: The Usurper
- 11679 SF Robert E. Howard (ed. L. Sprague de Camp) Conan: The Conqueror
- 11680 SF Robert E. Howard, Björn Nyberg, and L. Sprague de Camp Conan: The Avenger
- 11681 SF L. Sprague de Camp and Lin Carter Conan of the Isles
- 11682 SF L. Sprague de Camp and Lin Carter Conan of Aquilonia
- 11684 SF Andrew J. Offutt Conan and the Sorcerer (1979)
- 11705 SF Robert Silverberg Conquerors from the Darkness
- 11759 SF H. Beam Piper The Cosmic Computer
- 11863 SF Robert E. Howard and L. Sprague de Camp Conan the Freebooter
- 12126 SF Philip K. Dick The Crack in Space (1966)
- 12311 SF Andre Norton The Crossroads of Time
- 12313 SF Andre Norton The Crossroads of Time (1978)
- 13245 SF Alan Dean Foster Cyber Way
- 13600 SF Margaret St. Clair The Dancers of Noyo (1973)
- 13612 SF Robert E. Howard and L. Sprague de Camp Conan the Freebooter
- 13795 SF Andre Norton Dark Piper
- 13798 SF A. E. van Vogt The Darkness on Diamondia
- 13898 SF Robert Silverberg and Randall Garrett (jointly as Robert Randall) The Dawning Light (1982)
- 13902 SF Barry N. Malzberg The Day of the Burning
- 13921 SF Thomas Burnett Swann Day of the Minotaur
- 13960 SF Mack Reynolds Day After Tomorrow
- 13972 SF Brian M. Stableford Days of Wrath
- 13994 SF Andre Norton Daybreak - 2250 A. D.
- 14000 SF Brian M. Stableford The Days of Glory
- 14215 SF Greg Benford Deeper Than the Darkness
- 14235 SF Andre Norton The Defiant Agents (1978)
- 14236 SF Andre Norton The Defiant Agents
- 14244 SF James Schmitz The Demon Breed (1979)
- 14249 SF Andre Norton The Defiant Agents
- 14250 SF Mack Reynolds Depression Or Bust! and Dawnman's Planet
- 14251 SF Poul Anderson, Mildred Downey Broxon, Michael Whelan, and Alicia Austin The Demon of Scattery (1979)
- 14277 SF James Baen (ed.) Destinies Vol. 1, No. 3 (April - June, 1979)
- 14879 SF Tim Powers Dinner at Deviants Palace
- 14903 SF Frank Herbert Direct Descent
- 15238 SF George Warren Dominant Species
- 15670 SF Philip K. Dick Dr. Bloodmoney, Or How We Got Along After the Bomb (1976)
- 15697 SF Philip K. Dick The Unteleported Man (1972)
- 16600 SF Fred Saberhagen The Dracula Tape (1972)
- 16647 SF Andre Norton Dragon Magic
- 16648 SF Jack Vance The Dragon Masters
- 16651 SF Jack Vance The Dragon Masters
- 16668 SF John Brunner The Dramaturges of Yan
- 16669 SF Andre Norton Dread Companion (1970)
- 16670 SF Andre Norton Dread Companion (1970)
- 16701 SF Roger Zelazny The Dream Master
- 16728 SF Larry Niven and Steven Barnes Dream Park (1983)
- 17239 SF Ben Bova The Dueling Machine
- 17625 SF Frank Herbert Dune
- 18630 SF Gordon Eklund The Eclipse of Dawn (1970)
- 18770 SF Edgar Rice Burroughs Master of Adventure (1968)
- 19681 SF Samuel R. Delany The Einstein Intersection
- 19710 SF Bob Shaw A Wreath of Stars
- 20275 SF Alan Garner Elidor
- 20563 SF Fred Saberhagen Empire of the East
- 20565 SF Barrington J. Bayley Empire of Two Worlds
- 20571 SF Samuel R. Delany The Ballad of Beta-2 and Empire Star
- 20664 SF Jerry Pournelle Endless Frontier, Volume I
- 20670 SF Judith Merril (ed.) England Swings Sf: Stories of Speculative Fiction
- 20724 SF Poul Anderson Ensign Flandry
- 20730 SF Keith Laumer Envoy To New Worlds
- 21560 SF Edgar Rice Burroughs Escape on Venus (1969)
- 21561 SF Edgar Rice Burroughs Escape on Venus (1969)
- 21562 SF Edgar Rice Burroughs Escape on Venus
- 21567 SF Edgar Rice Burroughs Escape on Venus
- 21590 SF James White The Escape Orbit (1983)
- 21599 SF Christopher Stasheff Escape Velocity
- 21801 SF Edgar Rice Burroughs The Eternal Savage (July 1969)
- 21803 SF Edgar Rice Burroughs The Eternal Savage
- 21804 SF Edgar Rice Burroughs The Eternal Savage
- 21806 SF Edgar Rice Burroughs The Eternal Savage
- 21885 SF Jerry Pournelle Exiles To Glory (1977)
- 22215 SF Jerry Pournelle Exiles To Glory
- 22216 SF Jerry Pournelle Exiles To Glory
- 22365 SF Andre Norton Exiles of the Stars
- 22375 SF Andre Norton Eye of the Monster
- 22386 SF Philip K. Dick Eye in the Sky (1975)
- 22387 SF Philip K. Dick Eye in the Sky (1980)
- 22500 SF Jack Vance The Faceless Man: Book One of the Durdane Trilogy
- 22577 SF Marion Zimmer Bradley Falcons of Narabedla (1979)
- 22690 SF Barry N. Malzberg The Falling Astronauts
- 22811 SF A. E. van Vogt The Far-Out Worlds of Van Vogt (1968)
- 22812 SF A. E. van Vogt The Worlds of A.E. van Vogt
- 22819 SF Edmund Cooper A Far Sunset
- 22830 SF D. G. Compton Farewell, Earth's Bliss
- 23189 SF H. Beam Piper Federation (1982)
- 23419 SF H. Beam Piper (ed. Michael Kurland) First Cycle (1982)
- 23929 SF Dennis Schmidt Twilight of the Gods: The First Name
- 23998 SF Shariann Lewitt First and Final Rites
- 24035 SF Mack Reynolds Five Way Secret Agent and Mercenary from Tomorrow
- 24590 SF R. A. Lafferty Fourth Mansions (1969)
- 24620 SF Andre Norton Forerunner Foray (1973)
- 24622 SF Andre Norton Forerunner Foray (1980)
- 24623 SF Andre Norton Forerunner Foray (1982)
- 24624 SF Andre Norton Forerunner Foray (1984)
- 24800 SF Jules Verne For the Flag (1961)
- 24806 SF David C. Smith and Richard Tierney For the Witch of the Mists (1981)
- 24892 SF H. Beam Piper Four-Day Planet and Lone Star Planet
- 24903 SF Roger Zelazny Four For Tomorrow
- 25306 SF Arsen Darnay A Hostage For Hinterland (1976)
- 25460 SF Mary Staton From the Legend of Biel
- 25461 SF Mary Staton From the Legend of Biel
- 25950 SF Suzette Haden Elgin Furthest (1971)
- 25980 SF A. E. van Vogt Future Glitter (1973)
- 26176 SF H. Beam Piper Fuzzies and Other People
- 26181 SF William Tuning Fuzzy Bones
- 26192 SF H. Beam Piper Fuzzy Sapiens
- 26194 SF H. Beam Piper The Fuzzy Papers
- 26196 SF H. Beam Piper Fuzzy Sapiens
- 27226 SF Andre Norton Galactic Derelict
- 27227 SF Andre Norton Galactic Derelict
- 27228 SF Andre Norton Galactic Derelict
- 27229 SF Andre Norton Galactic Derelict (1978)
- 27231 SF Andre Norton Galactic Derelict (1982)
- 27232 SF Jack Vance Galactic Effectuator (1981)
- 27233 SF Andre Norton Galactic Derelict (1984)
- 27234 SF Andre Norton Galactic Derelict (1987)
- 27240 SF Mack Reynolds Galactic Medal of Honor
- 27310 SF Philip K. Dick The Game-Players of Titan (1972)
- 27346 SF Philip K. Dick and Ray Nelson The Ganymede Takeover (1977)
- 27389 SF Philip José Farmer The Gates of Creation (1981)
- 27419 SF Edmund Cooper A Far Sunset (1977)
- 27501 SF Samuel R. Delany The Fall of the Towers
- 27910 SF Howard Fast The General Zapped An Angel
- 28702 SF James P. Blaylock The Stone Giant (1989)
- 29400 SF L. Sprague de Camp The Glory That Was (1979)
- 29525 SF Robert E. Howard The Gods of Bal-Sagoth
- 30261 SF Frank Herbert The Green Brain
- 30262 SF Frank Herbert The Green Brain
- 30263 SF Frank Herbert The Green Brain
- 30274 SF Lucius Shepard Green Eyes (1984)
- 30295 SF Charles de Lint Greenmantle (1988)
- 30301 SF Fritz Leiber The Green Millennium
- 30590 SF Louis Trimble and Jacquelyn Trimble Guardians of the Gate
- 30600 SF Edwin L. Arnold Gulliver of Mars (1905)
- 31557 SF Andre Norton The X Factor
- 31590 SF Leigh Brackett The Halfling and Other Stories (1973)
- 31800 SF Robert A. Heinlein Have Space Suit - Will Travel
- 31801 SF Robert A. Heinlein Have Space Suit - Will Travel
- 31986 SF David Drake Hammer's Slammers
- 32800 SF Frank Herbert Heretics of Dune (1987)
- 33700 SF Andre Norton High Sorcery
- 33701 SF Andre Norton High Sorcery (1970)
- 33704 SF Andre Norton High Sorcery
- 34245 SF Fred Saberhagen The Holmes-Dracula File (1978)
- 34345 SF Orson Scott Card Hot Sleep: The Worthing Chronicle
- 34458 SF Glenn Lord (ed.) The Howard Collector
- 34900 SF Bruce McAllister Humanity Prime
- 35421 SF Andre Norton Huon of the Horn (1968)
- 35422 SF Andre Norton Huon of the Horn (1973)
- 35804 SF Edgar Rice Burroughs I Am a Barbarian
- 35805 SF Edgar Rice Burroughs I Am a Barbarian (1978)
- 35840 SF Andre Norton Ice Crown (1970)
- 35843 SF Andre Norton Ice Crown
- 35854 SF Kim Stanley Robinson Icehenge (1984)
- 36321 SF Andre Norton Victory on Janus
- 37088 SF Walt Richmond The Probability Corner
- 37090 SF Mark Adlard Interface (1971)
- 37100 SF Arthur K. Barnes Interplanetary Hunter (1972)
- 37106 SF Brian M. Stableford In the Kingdom of the Beasts
- 37217 SF Colin Kapp The Ion War (1978)
- 37291 SF Andre Norton Iron Cage (1974)
- 37365 SF Robert E. Howard The Iron Man
- 37421 SF H.G. Wells The Island of Dr. Moreau (1977)
- 37425 SF Avram Davidson An Island Under the Earth (1969)
- 37465 SF Roger Zelazny Isle of the Dead (1969)
- 37466 SF Roger Zelazny Isle of the Dead (1974)
- 37468 SF Roger Zelazny Isle of the Dead (1976)
- 37470 SF Roger Zelazny Isle of the Dead (1982)
- 37797 SF Esther Friesner Here Be Demons
- 38120 SF John Brunner The Jagged Orbit (March 1969)
- 38122 SF John Brunner The Jagged Orbit
- 38287 SF Jerry Pournelle The Janissaries
- 38536 SF E. C. Tubb The Jester at Scar: Dumarest of Terra#5 (1982)
- 38570 SF C. L. Moore Jirel of Joiry
- 40850 SF Robert Sheckley The Journey of Joenes
- 41550 SF Andre Norton Judgement on Janus
- 41551 SF Andre Norton Judgement on Janus
- 42801 SF E. C. Tubb Kalin
- 43525 SF Dennis Schmidt Kensho
- 43672 SF Andre Norton Key Out of Time (1978)
- 43679 SF Andre Norton Key Out of Time
- 44470 SF Edgar Wallace and Merian C. Cooper King Kong (1976)
- 44485 SF Christopher Stasheff King Kobold
- 44489 SF Christopher Stasheff King Kobold Revived
- 45000 SF Andre Norton Knave of Dreams (1976)
- 45001 SF Andre Norton Knave of Dreams
- 46272 SF Edgar Rice Burroughs The Lad and the Lion (1978)
- 46850 SF Thomas Burnett Swann Lady of the Bees
- 46996 SF Edgar Rice Burroughs Land of Terror
- 46997 SF Edgar Rice Burroughs Land of Terror
- 47000 SF Edgar Rice Burroughs Land of Terror
- 47013 SF Edgar Rice Burroughs The Land of Hidden Men
- 47020 SF Edgar Rice Burroughs The Land That Time Forgot
- 47022 SF Edgar Rice Burroughs The Land That Time Forgot
- 47023 SF Edgar Rice Burroughs The Land That Time Forgot
- 47026 SF Edgar Rice Burroughs The Land That Time Forgot
- 47042 SF Jack Vance The Languages of Pao
- 47161 SF Andre Norton The Last Planet
- 47162 SF Andre Norton The Last Planet
- 47440 SF Andre Norton Lavender-Green Magic (1977)
- 47800 SF Ursula K. Le Guin The Left Hand of Darkness (1969)
- 47805 SF Ursula K. Le Guin The Left Hand of Darkness (1976)
- 48494 SF H. Beam Piper Little Fuzzy
- 48520 SF Fred Saberhagen The Berserker Wars
- 48970 SF Mack Reynolds Looking Backward, From the Year 2000 (1973)
- 49051 SF H. Beam Piper Lord Kalvan of Otherwhen
- 49236 SF Andre Norton Lord of Thunder
- 49291 SF Edgar Rice Burroughs The Lost Continent (September 1969)
- 49294 SF Edgar Rice Burroughs The Lost Continent
- 49500 SF Edgar Rice Burroughs Lost on Venus (1969)
- 49501 SF Edgar Rice Burroughs Lost on Venus
- 49504 SF Edgar Rice Burroughs Lost on Venus
- 49506 SF Edgar Rice Burroughs Lost on Venus
- 49507 SF Edgar Rice Burroughs Lost on Venus
- 49548 SF Fred Saberhagen Love Conquers All
- 49851 SF Allen Steele Orbital Decay
- 50485 SF Allen Steele Lunar Descent
- 50531 SF Jack Vance Madouc
- 51356 SF Steve Perry The Machiavelli Interface (1986)
- 51388 SF Michael Moorcock The Mad God's Amulet
- 51401 SF Edgar Rice Burroughs The Mad King
- 51402 SF Edgar Rice Burroughs The Mad King
- 51403 SF Edgar Rice Burroughs The Mad King
- 51404 SF Edgar Rice Burroughs The Mad King
- 51409 SF Edgar Rice Burroughs The Mad King
- 51544 SF Larry Niven The Magic Goes Away (1978)
- 51590 SF John Eric Holmes Mahars of Pellucidar
- 51624 SF Philip José Farmer The Maker of Universes
- 51647 SF Brian Aldiss The Malacia Tapestry (1976)
- 51702 SF Edgar Rice Burroughs The Mad King
- 51910 SF Philip K. Dick The Man Who Japed (1975)
- 51918 SF Steve Perry The Man Who Never Missed (1986)
- 51943 SF David Alexander Smith Marathon
- 52075 SF Henry Kuttner, Bob Pepper, and Alicia Austin The Mask of Circe (1971)
- 52077 SF Fred Saberhagen The Mask of the Sun
- 52078 SF Fred Saberhagen The Mask of the Sun
- 52207 SF Steve Perry Matadora (1986)
- 52400 SF John Brunner Meeting at Infinity (February 1969)
- 52470 SF Donald A. Wollheim (ed.) Men on the Moon
- 52560 SF Alan E. Nourse The Mercy Men
- 52975 SF Gerard F. Conway The Midnight Dancers
- 53151 SF John W. Campbell The Mightiest Machine
- 53167 SF Algis Budrys, Charles G. Waugh, and Martin Harry Greenberg (eds.) Space Dogfights (1992)
- 53183 SF John Varley Millennium
- 53299 SF Spider Robinson Mindkiller
- 53355 SF Ian Watson Miracle Visitors
- 53503 SF Andrew J. Offutt The Mists of Doom
- 53540 SF George Zebrowski The Monadic Universe
- 53570 SF D. G. Compton The Missionaries (1972)
- 53587 SF Edgar Rice Burroughs The Monster Men
- 53588 SF Edgar Rice Burroughs The Monster Men
- 53591 SF Edgar Rice Burroughs The Monster Men
- 53701 SF Edgar Rice Burroughs The Moon Maid
- 53702 SF Edgar Rice Burroughs The Moon Maid
- 53703 SF Edgar Rice Burroughs The Moon Maid
- 53705 SF Edgar Rice Burroughs The Moon Maid
- 53719 SF Charles de Lint Moonheart (1984)
- 53753 SF Edgar Rice Burroughs The Moon Men
- 53756 SF Edgar Rice Burroughs The Moon Men
- 53780 SF John W. Campbell The Moon is Hell
- 54101 SF Andre Norton Moon of 3 Rings
- 54201 SF Thomas Burnett Swann Moondust
- 54460 SF Edgar Rice Burroughs The Mucker (1974)
- 54462 SF Edgar Rice Burroughs The Mucker (1914)
- 54484 SF Charles De Lint Mulengro: A Romany Tale (1985)
- 54500 SF Mark Adlard Multiface (1975)
- 55145 SF Fritz Leiber You're All Alone (1973)
- 55309 SF Fred Saberhagen The Mask of the Sun
- 56010 SF Gordon R. Dickson Naked to the Stars
- 56940 SF Leigh Brackett The Nemesis from Terra (1976)
- 57752 SF Andre Norton Night of Masks
- 58024 SF Mark E. Rogers The Nightmare of God (1988)
- 58050 SF R. A. Lafferty Nine Hundred Grandmothers (1970)
- 60563 SF Edgar Rice Burroughs The Oakdale Affair
- 60564 SF Edgar Rice Burroughs The Oakdale Affair
- 60739 SF Fred Saberhagen Octagon (1981)
- 62160 SF Fred Saberhagen Old Friend of the Family (1979)
- 62380 SF George Zebrowski The Omega Point
- 62938 SF Bob Shaw One Million Tomorrows (1970)
- 63165 SF Kenneth Bulmer On the Symb-Socket Circuit (1972)
- 63410 SF Andre Norton Operation Time Search
- 63590 SF John Rankine Operation Umanaq (1973)
- 63780 SF Bob Shaw Orbitsville
- 64146 SF John Dechancie Paradox Alley (1987)
- 64240 SF Bob Shaw Other Days, Other Eyes
- 64400 SF Philip K. Dick Our Friends from Frolix 8 (1970)
- 64401 SF Philip K. Dick Our Friends from Frolix 8 (1977)
- 64484 SF Edgar Rice Burroughs Out of Times Abyss
- 64514 SF Edgar Rice Burroughs The Outlaw of Torn
- 65050 SF Bob Shaw The Palace of Eternity
- 65125 SF Jack Williamson The Pandora Effect (1969)
- 65169 SF H. Beam Piper Paratime (1981)
- 65316 SF Larry Niven The Patchwork Girl (1981)
- 65353 SF Fred Saberhagen Octagon
- 65390 SF Colin Kapp Patterns of Chaos (1978)
- 65412 SF Edgar Rice Burroughs The Outlaw of Torn (1973)
- 65430 SF Keith Roberts Pavane (1966)
- 65852 SF Edgar Rice Burroughs Pellucidar
- 65855 SF Edgar Rice Burroughs Pellucidar
- 65890 SF Jack Williamson People Machines
- 65941 SF Edgar Rice Burroughs The People That Time Forgot
- 65942 SF Edgar Rice Burroughs The People That Time Forgot
- 65946 SF Edgar Rice Burroughs The People That Time Forgot
- 65948 SF Mack Reynolds Perchance To Dream
- 66100 SF Avram Davidson The Phoenix and the Mirror
- 66141 SF Walt Richmond and Leigh Richmond Phase 2
- 66201 SF Joanna Russ Picnic on Paradise
- 66320 SF Robert E. Howard Pigeons from Hell (1978)
- 66502 SF Edgar Rice Burroughs Pirates of Venus
- 66503 SF Edgar Rice Burroughs Pirates of Venus
- 66505 SF Edgar Rice Burroughs Pirates of Venus
- 66509 SF Edgar Rice Burroughs Pirates of Venus
- 66833 SF Andre Norton Plague Ship (1973)
- 66899 SF Jack Vance Planet of Adventure#1: City of the Chasch
- 66900 SF Jack Vance Planet of Adventure#2: Servants of the Wankh
- 66901 SF Jack Vance Planet of Adventure#3: The Dirdir (1969)
- 66902 SF Jack Vance Planet of Adventure#4: The Pnume (1970)
- 66952 SF Ursula K. Le Guin Planet of Exile
- 67020 SF Marion Zimmer Bradley The Planet Savers
- 67025 SF Marion Zimmer Bradley The Planet Savers and The Sword of Aldones
- 67060 SF John Jakes The Planet Wizard
- 67061 SF John Jakes The Planet Wizard
- 67145 SF Michael Kurland Pluribus
- 67402 SF Robert A. Heinlein Podkayne of Mars
- 67555 SF Andre Norton Postmarked the Stars (1969)
- 67800 SF Philip K. Dick The Preserving Machine (1969)
- 67801 SF Philip K. Dick The Preserving Machine (1976)
- 67900 SF Thomas M. Disch The Prisoner (1969)
- 67901 SF David McDaniel The Prisoner#2
- 67902 SF Hank Stine The Prisoner#3 (1970)
- 67937 SF L. Sprague de Camp The Prisoner of Zhamanak
- 68023 SF Gordon R. Dickson Pro
- 68305 SF Stephen Robinette Projections
- 69168 SF Arsen Darnay The Purgatory Zone (1981)
- 69190 SF L. Sprague de Camp The Purple Pterodactyls: The Adventures of Wilson Newbury, Ensorcelled Financier (1980)
- 69540 SF D. G. Compton The Quality of Mercy
- 69658 SF L. Sprague de Camp The Queen of Zamba
- 69681 SF Andre Norton Quest Crosstime
- 69682 SF Andre Norton Quest Crosstime
- 69683 SF Andre Norton Quest Crosstime
- 69684 SF Andre Norton Quest Crosstime
- 69700 SF A. E. van Vogt Quest for the Future
- 69770 SF Poul Anderson Question and Answer
- 69992 SF Jack L. Chalker Quintara Marathon#1: The Demons at Rainbow Bridge
- 71065 SF Alfred Coppel (as Robert Cham Gilman) The Rebel of Rhada (1968)
- 71083 SF E. C. Tubb Lallia: Dumarest of Terra#6 (1982)
- 71100 SF Andre Norton Red Hart Magic (1979)
- 71140 SF Robert A. Heinlein Red Planet
- 71156 SF David C. Smith and Richard L. Tierney The Ring of Ikribu: Red Sonja#1 (1981)
- 71157 SF David C. Smith and Richard L. Tierney Demon Night: Red Sonja#2 (1982)
- 71158 SF David C. Smith and Richard L. Tierney When Hell Laughs: Red Sonja#3 (1982)
- 71159 SF David C. Smith and Richard L. Tierney Endithor's Daughter: Red Sonja#4 (1982)
- 71160 SF D. D. Chapman and Deloris Lehman Tarzan Red Tide
- 71161 SF David C. Smith and Richard L. Tierney Against the Prince of Hell: Red Sonja#5 (1983)
- 71162 SF David C. Smith and Richard L. Tierney Star of Doom: Red Sonja#6 (1983)
- 71335 SF Philip José Farmer Behind the Walls of Terra (1970)
- 71435 SF John T. Sladek Mechasm
- 71500 SF A. E. van Vogt The Silkie
- 71502 SF Keith Laumer Retief at Large
- 71803 SF E. C. Tubb Lallia
- 72280 SF Edgar Rice Burroughs The Rider
- 73293 SF Ursula K. Le Guin Rocannon's World
- 73330 SF Robert A. Heinlein Rocket Ship Galileo
- 73438 SF Kenneth Bulmer Roller Coaster World
- 73440 SF Robert A. Heinlein The Rolling Stones
- 73441 SF Robert A. Heinlein The Rolling Stones
- 73450 SF Mack Reynolds Rolltown
- 73532 SF Andre Norton Secret of the Lost Race
- 74860 SF Robert A. Heinlein To Sail Beyond the Sunset
- 74981 SF Andre Norton Sargasso of Space
- 74982 SF Andre Norton Sargasso of Space
- 75045 SF Mack Reynolds Satellite City
- 75131 SF Edgar Rice Burroughs Savage Pellucidar
- 75134 SF Edgar Rice Burroughs Savage Pellucidar
- 75136 SF Edgar Rice Burroughs Savage Pellucidar
- 75441 SF Sam J. Lundwall Science Fiction: What It's All About (1977)
- 75690 SF George Bamber The Sea Is Boiling Hot
- 75695 SF Andre Norton Sea Siege
- 75696 SF Andre Norton Sea Siege
- 75800 SF George Bamber The Sea Is Boiling Hot (1971)
- 75830 SF Andre Norton Secret of the Lost Race
- 75831 SF Andre Norton Secret of the Lost Race
- 75832 SF Andre Norton Secret of the Lost Race
- 75833 SF Andre Norton Secret of the Lost Race (1978)
- 75834 SF Andre Norton Secret of the Lost Race (1981)
- 75835 SF Andre Norton Secret of the Lost Race
- 75836 SF Andre Norton Secret of the Lost Race
- 75860 SF Mack Reynolds Section G: United Planets
- 75875 SF Robert Silverberg The Seeds of Earth
- 75894 SF Eric Frank Russell Sentinels from Space
- 75940 SF Marion Zimmer Bradley Seven from the Stars
- 76098 SF Bob Shaw Ship of Strangers
- 76099 SF Robert E. Howard The She Devil (1983)
- 76219 SF Robert Silverberg and Randall Garrett (jointly as Robert Randall) The Shrouded Planet (1982)
- 76343 SF Charles Sheffield Sight of Proteus
- 76385 SF D. G. Compton The Silent Multitude
- 76390 SF Robert Silverberg The Silent Invaders
- 76391 SF Robert Silverberg The Silent Invaders (1977)
- 76500 SF A. E. van Vogt The Silkie
- 76501 SF A. E. van Vogt The Silkie
- 76502 SF A. E. van Vogt The Silkie
- 76701 SF Philip K. Dick The Simulacra (1976)
- 76801 SF Andre Norton The Sioux Spaceman
- 76802 SF Andre Norton The Sioux Spaceman
- 76836 SF Walt Richmond and Leigh Richmond Siva! (1979)
- 76942 SF Harry Harrison Skyfall (1978)
- 77408 SF Rudy Rucker Software
- 77410 SF Philip K. Dick Solar Lottery (1974)
- 77411 SF Philip K. Dick Solar Lottery (1975)
- 77419 SF Gordon R. Dickson Soldier, Ask Not (1982)
- 77427 SF Brian Herbert (ed.) The Poetry of Frank Herbert: Songs of Muad'dib
- 77551 SF Andre Norton Sorceress of the Witch World
- 77554 SF Andre Norton Sorceress of the Witch World (1968)
- 77620 SF Robert E. Howard The Sowers of the Thunder (1979)
- 77730 SF Robert A. Heinlein Space Cadet
- 77780 SF H. Beam Piper Space Viking
- 77782 SF Mack Reynolds Space Visitor
- 77783 SF Mack Reynolds Space Visitor
- 77791 SF Fred Saberhagen Specimens
- 77953 SF Marion Zimmer Bradley Star of Danger
- 78000 SF Robert A. Heinlein The Star Beast
- 78011 SF Andre Norton Star Born
- 78035 SF Keith Laumer Star Colony
- 78071 SF Andre Norton Star Gate
- 78318 SF Pamela Sargent Starshadows
- 78432 SF Andre Norton The Stars Are Ours!
- 78477 SF Gerry Turnbull (ed.) A Star Trek Catalog: The Complete Guide to the Fantastic World of Star Trek (1979)
- 78479 SF Ben Bova Star Watchman
- 78565 SF John Varley Steel Beach
- 78575 SF D. G. Compton The Steel Crocodile (1970)
- 78585 SF Jerry Pournelle A Step Farther Out
- 78650 SF Philip José Farmer The Stone God Awakens (1970)
- 78651 SF Philip José Farmer The Stone God Awakens (1973)
- 78652 SF Philip José Farmer The Stone God Awakens (1975)
- 78653 SF Philip José Farmer The Stone God Awakens (1979)
- 78654 SF Philip José Farmer The Stone God Awakens (1980)
- 78657 SF Poul Anderson Dominic Flandry: A Stone in Heaven
- 78741 SF Andre Norton Storm Over Warlock
- 78742 SF Andre Norton Storm Over Warlock (1973)
- 79034 SF Robert A. Heinlein Stranger in a Strange Land
- 79112 SF Marion Zimmer Bradley Survey Ship
- 79141 SF Leigh Brackett The Sword of Rhiannon
- 79150 SF Fritz Leiber Swords Against Death
- 79157 SF Fritz Leiber Swords Against Death
- 79161 SF Fritz Leiber Swords Against Wizardry
- 79165 SF Fritz Leiber Swords Against Wizardry
- 79170 SF Fritz Leiber Swords and Deviltry
- 79176 SF Fritz Leiber Swords and Deviltry
- 79181 SF Fritz Leiber Swords in the Mist
- 79185 SF Fritz Leiber Swords in the Mist
- 79221 SF Fritz Leiber The Swords of Lankhmar
- 79222 SF Fritz Leiber The Swords of Lankhmar
- 79431 SF Andre Norton The Stars Are Ours!
- 79791 SF Edgar Rice Burroughs Tanar of Pellucidar
- 79797 SF Edgar Rice Burroughs Tanar of Pellucidar
- 79854 SF Edgar Rice Burroughs Tarzan at the Earth's Core
- 80010 SF William Shatner Teklords
- 80011 SF William Shatner Teklab
- 80012 SF William Shatner Tekvengeance
- 80180 SF James Tiptree, Jr. Ten Thousand Light-Years from Home
- 80208 SF William Shatner Tekwar
- 80680 SF Robert Lory The Thirteen Bracelets
- 80691 SF Roger Zelazny This Immortal
- 80705 SF Robert E. Howard Tigers of the Sea
- 80780 SF Robert E. Howard Three-Bladed Doom (1979)
- 80801 SF Andre Norton Three Against the Witch World
- 80805 SF Andre Norton Three Against the Witch World (1978)
- 80855 SF Alexei Panshin The Thurb Revolution (1978)
- 80933 SF Spider Robinson Time Pressure (1988)
- 81000 SF Clifford D. Simak Time & Again
- 81001 SF Clifford D. Simak Time & Again
- 81012 SF Keith Laumer The Time Bender
- 81125 SF Robert A. Heinlein Time for the Stars
- 81126 SF Robert A. Heinlein Time for the Stars
- 81251 SF Andre Norton The Time Traders
- 81253 SF Andre Norton The Time Traders
- 81254 SF Andre Norton The Time Traders (1984)
- 81270 SF John Brunner Times Without Number (October 1969)
- 81277 SF Spider Robinson Time Travelers Strictly Cash (1981)
- 81656 SF Bob Shaw Tomorrow Lies in Ambush
- 81670 SF Mack Reynolds Tomorrow Might Be Different
- 81900 SF Thomas Burnett Swann The Tournament of Thorns
- 81973 SF E. C. Tubb Toyman: Dumarest of Terra#3
- 82210 SF John Brunner The Traveler in Black
- 82355 SF Andre Norton Trey of Swords (1978)
- 82660 SF Robert A. Heinlein Tunnel in the Sky
- 84000 SF Andre Norton Uncharted Stars
- 84292 SF H. Beam Piper Uller Uprising
- 84331 SF John W. Campbell The Ultimate Weapon
- 84514 SF Andrew Offutt The Undying Wizard
- 84569 SF Axel Madsen Unisave
- 84581 SF A. E. van Vogt The Universe Maker
- 85456 SF Alan E. Nourse The Universe Between (1987)
- 86050 SF Philip K. Dick The Variable Man and Other Stories (1976)
- 86064 SF Fred Saberhagen The Veils of Azlaroc
- 86065 SF Fred Saberhagen The Veils of Azlaroc
- 86180 SF E. C. Tubb Veruchia
- 86181 SF E. C. Tubb Veruchia: Dumarest of Terra#8 (1982)
- 86190 SF Ian Watson Very Slow Time Machine
- 86607 SF Mark Adlard Volteface (1972)
- 86608 SF Philip K. Dick Vulcan's Hammer (1972)
- 86610 SF Andre Norton, Wojciech Siudmak, and Alicia Austin Voorloper (1980)
- 87060 SF Michael Moorcock The Warlord of the Air (1971)
- 87180 SF A. E. van Vogt The War Against the Rull
- 87201 SF Poul Anderson War of the Wing-Men
- 87269 SF George Zebrowski Ashes & Stars
- 87300 SF Christopher Shasheff The Warlock in Spite of Himself
- 87301 SF Christopher Shasheff The Warlock in Spite of Himself
- 87319 SF Andre Norton Warlock of the Witch World
- 87321 SF Andre Norton Warlock of the Witch World
- 87322 SF Andre Norton Warlock of the Witch World
- 87323 SF Andre Norton Warlock of the Witch World (1978)
- 87325 SF Christopher Stasheff Warlock Unlocked
- 87328 SF Christopher Stasheff Warlock Unlocked
- 87332 SF Christopher Stasheff Warlock Unlocked
- 87625 SF Dennis Schmidt Way-Farer
- 87631 SF H. G. Wells The War of the Worlds (1988)
- 87855 SF A. E. van Vogt The Weapon Shops of Isher
- 87873 SF Andre Norton Web of the Witch World
- 87874 SF Andre Norton Web of the Witch World
- 87875 SF Andre Norton Web of the Witch World
- 87941 SF Thomas Burnett Swann The Weirwoods
- 88065 SF Edmond Hamilton What's It Like Out There? (And Other Stories)
- 88091 SF H. G. Wells When the Sleeper Wakes
- 88270 SF Thomas Burnett Swann Where Is the Bird of Fire? (1970)
- 88564 SF Rudy Rucker White Light
- 88601 SF Clifford D. Simak Why Call Them Back from Heaven?
- 89251 SF Marion Zimmer Bradley The Winds of Darkover
- 89701 SF Andre Norton Witch World
- 89702 SF Andre Norton Witch World
- 89851 SF James H. Schmitz The Witches of Karres
- 90075 SF Ursula K. Le Guin A Wizard of Earthsea
- 90190 SF Edgar Rice Burroughs The Wizard of Venus and Pirate Blood
- 90191 SF Edgar Rice Burroughs The Wizard of Venus (1973)
- 90194 SF Edgar Rice Burroughs The Wizard of Venus and Pirate Blood
- 90872 SF R.A. Salvatore The Woods Out Back
- 90926 SF Frank Herbert The Worlds of Frank Herbert (1971)
- 90951 SF Philip K. Dick The World Jones Made (1975)
- 90955 SF Jack Vance The World of Jack Vance
- 91010 SF Gregory Frost Lyrec (1984)
- 91052 SF John Carr (ed.) The Worlds of H. Beam Piper
- 91055 SF Poul Anderson The Worlds of Poul Anderson
- 91060 SF Theodore Sturgeon The Worlds of Theodore Sturgeon
- 91170 SF Marion Zimmer Bradley The World Wreckers
- 91352 SF Donald A. Wollheim and Terry Carr (eds.) World's Best Science Fiction, 1969
- 91353 SF Donald A. Wollheim and Terry Carr (eds.) World's Best Science Fiction, First Series
- 91354 SF Donald A. Wollheim and Terry Carr (eds.) World's Best Science Fiction, Second Series
- 91355 SF Donald A. Wollheim and Terry Carr (eds.) World's Best Science Fiction, Third Series
- 91356 SF Donald A. Wollheim and Terry Carr (eds.) World's Best Science Fiction, Fourth Series
- 91357 SF Donald A. Wollheim and Terry Carr (eds.) World's Best Science Fiction, 1970
- 91358 SF Donald A. Wollheim and Terry Carr (eds.) World's Best Science Fiction, 1971
- 91359 SF Frederik Pohl Best SF for 1972
- 91502 SF Robert A. Heinlein The Worlds of Robert A. Heinlein (1973)
- 91581 SF Keith Laumer Worlds of the Imperium
- 91640 SF Fritz Leiber The Worlds of Fritz Leiber
- 91706 SF Poul Anderson World Without Stars
- 91770 SF Robert E. Howard Worms of the Earth
- 92551 SF Andre Norton The X Factor
- 92553 SF Andre Norton The X Factor
- 94200 SF Wilson Tucker The Year of the Quiet Sun (1970)
- 94251 SF Andre Norton Year of the Unicorn
- 94254 SF Andre Norton Year of the Unicorn (1979)
- 95490 SF Andre Norton Zarsthor's Bane (1978)
- 95941 SF Andre Norton Zarsthor's Bane
- 95960 SF Andre Norton The Zero Stone
- 95961 SF Andre Norton The Zero Stone
- 95964 SF Andre Norton The Zero Stone (1981)
