= List of Ace titles in F series =

Ace Books published its F-series of books, priced at 40 cents, from 1960 to 1967.

- F-101 NA Joan Sargent Cruise Nurse / Margaret Howe Calling Dr. Merriman (1960)
- F-102 MY Bob McKnight The Flying Eye / Clayton Fox Never Forget, Never Forgive (1961)
- F-103 WE Harry Whittington A Trap For Sam Dodge / Lee Floren High Thunder (1961)
- F-104 SF Kenneth Bulmer No Man's World / Poul Anderson Mayday Orbit (1961)
- F-105 SF William A. P. White (as Anthony Boucher) (ed.) The Best From Fantasy And Science Fiction, Fifth Series
- F-106 WE Brian Garfield Justice At Spanish Flat / Tom West The Gun From Nowhere (1961)
- F-107 MY Chester Warwick My Pal, The Killer / John Trinian Scratch A Thief (1961)
- F-108 SF G. McDonald Wallis The Light of Lilith / Damon Knight The Sun Saboteurs (1961)
- F-109 SF Andre Norton Storm Over Warlock (1961)
- F-110 WE Ray Hogan Track The Man Down / Lee Wells Savage Range (1961)
- F-111 MY J. M. Flynn The Girl From Las Vegas / Robert Martin To Have And To Kill (1960)
- F-112 NA Jeanne Judson Barbara Ames - Private Secretary / Nell Marr Dean Ratzlaff (as Nell Marr Dean) Fashions For Carol (1961)
- F-113 SF Charles L. Fontenay Rebels of The Red Planet / J. T. McIntosh 200 Years to Christmas (1961)
- F-114 SF Wallace West The Bird of Time (1961)
- F-115 MY John Creighton The Blonde Cried Murder / Fletcher Flora Killing Cousins (1961)
- F-116 WE Dwight Bennett Newton (as Clement Hardin) The Lurking Gun / Louis Trimble Deadman Canyon (1961)
- F-117 SF Marion Zimmer Bradley The Door Through Space / A. Bertram Chandler Rendezvous on a Lost World (1961)
- F-118 NA Jacob O. Kamm Making Profits In The Stock Market (1961)
- F-119 SF Gordon R. Dickson Spacial Delivery / Delusion World (1961)
- F-120 WE Jack M. Brickham Gunman Can't Hide / John Callahan Come In Shooting (1961)
- F-121 MY Helen Nielson Sing Me A Murder / Helen Nielson Woman Missing And Other Stories (1961)
- F-122 NA [Dorothy Worley] Dr. Kilbourne Comes Home/[Patti Stone] Calling Nurse Linda (1961)
- F-123 SF Leigh Brackett The Nemesis From Terra
- F-123 SF Robert Silverberg Collision Course / Leigh Brackett The Nemesis From Terra (1961)
- F-124 WE Steven G. Lawrence Slatterly / Steven G. Lawrence Bullet Welcome For Slatterly (1961)
- F-125 MY J. M. Flynn Deep Six / Frank Diamond The Widow Maker (1961)
- F-126 WE Edwin Booth The Troublemaker / Ray Hogan A Marshall For Lawless (1962)
- F-127 SF Marion Zimmer BradleySeven From The Stars / Keith Laumer Worlds Of The Imperium (1962)
- F-128 WE Tom West The Buzzard's Nest / Louis Trimble Siege At High Meadow (1962)
- F-129 SF William F. Temple The Automated Goliath / William F. Temple The Three Suns Of Amara (1962)
- F-130 MY J. M. Flynn The Screaming Cargo / James A. Howard The Bullet-Proof Martyr (1961)
- F-131 SF William A. P. White (as Anthony Boucher) (ed.) The Best From Fantasy And Science Fiction, Sixth Series
- F-132 NA Mario Cappelli Scramble! (1962)
- F-133 SF John Brunner Secret Agent of Terra / A. Bertram Chandler The Rim of Space (1962)
- F-134 WE Rod Patterson A Shooting At Sundust / Gordon D. Shirreffs Tumbleweed Trigger (1962)
- F-135 SF Leigh Brackett The Long Tomorrow (1962)
- F-136 NA [Elyse Michaels Sommer (ed.)] Childbirth: True Accounts of Unusual Experiences (1962)
- F-137 NA R. Dewitt Miller Impossible: Yet It Happened! (1962)
- F-138 WE Steven G. Lawrence Walk A Narrow Trail / Steven G. Lawrence A Noose For Slattery (1962)
- F-139 SF Poul Anderson The Makeshift Rocket/Un-Man and Other Stories (1962)
- F-140 NA Leonie St. John Love With A Harvard Accent (1962)
- F-141 SF Robert Moore Williams The Darkness Before Tomorrow / John Brunner (as Keith Woodcott) The Ladder In The Sky (1962)
- F-142 WE L. P. Holmes Wolf Brand / Smoky Pass (1962)
- F-143 MY Bob McKnight A Stone Around Her Neck / Clayton Fox End Of A Big Wheel (1962)
- F-144 WE Brian Garfield (as Frank Wynne) Massacre Basin / Dwight Bennett Newton (as Clement Hardin) The Badge Shooters (1962)
- F-145 SF Robert Silverberg Next Stop The Stars / The Seed of Earth (1962)
- F-146 NA John Jakes (as Jay Scotland) Sir Scoundrel (1962)
- F-147 SF Andre Norton The Sea Siege / The Eye of The Monster (1962)
- F-148 WE Harry Whittington Wild Sky / Tom West Dead Man's Double Cross (1962)
- F-149 SF Robert Moore Williams King of the Fourth Planet / Charles V. DeVet & Katherine MacLean Cosmic Checkmate (1962)
- F-150 WE Nelson C. Nye Hideout Mountain / Rafe (1962)
- F-151 NA Nedra Tyre Reformatory Girls (1962)
- F-152 WE Gordon D. Shirreffs Rio Desperado //Voice Of The Gun (1962)
- F-153 SF Marion Zimmer Bradley The Sword of Aldones / The Planet Savers (1962)
- F-154 SF A. E. van Vogt The Wizard Of Linn (1962)
- F-155 MY Lionel White A Death At Sea / The Time Of Terror (1961)
- F-156 SF Edgar Rice Burroughs At The Earth's Core (1962)
- F-157 SF Edgar Rice Burroughs The Moon Maid (1962)
- F-158 SF Edgar Rice Burroughs Pellucidar (1962)
- F-159 SF Edgar Rice Burroughs The Moon Men (1962)
- F-160 WE Ray Hogan New Gun For Kingdom City / The Shotgunner (1962)
- F-161 SF John Brunner Times Without Number / Donald A. Wollheim (as David Grinnell) Destiny's Orbit (1962)
- F-162 SF William A. P. White (as Anthony Boucher) (ed.) The Best From Fantasy And Science Fiction, Seventh Series (1962)
- F-163 NA Adele De Leeuw Doctor Ellen (1962)
- F-164 WE Steven G. Lawrence Longhorns North / Slattery's Gun Says "No" (1962)
- F-165 SF Philip José Farmer Cache From Outer Space / The Celestial Blueprint (1962)
- F-166 MY Georges Simenon Maigret And The Reluctant Witness / Maigret Has Scruples (1958)
- F-167 SF Andre Norton Catseye (1962)
- F-168 SF Edgar Rice Burroughs Thuvia, Maid Of Mars (1962)
- F-169 SF Edgar Rice Burroughs Tarzan And The Lost Empire (1962)
- F-170 SF Edgar Rice Burroughs The Chessmen Of Mars (1962)
- F-171 SF Edgar Rice Burroughs Tanar Of Pellucidar (1962)
- F-172 WE Tom West Battling Buckeroos / Giles A. Lutz Gun Rich (1962)
- F-173 SF James White Second Ending / Samuel R. Delany The Jewels of Aptor (1962)
- F-174 SF S. B. Hough (as Rex Gordon) First Through Time (1962)
- F-175 NA Evelyn Berckman Lament For Four Brides (1962)
- F-176 WE Dan J. Stevens Gun Trap At Bright Water / Ray Hogan The Outside Gun (1963)
- F-177 SF Terry Carr Warlord of Kor / Robert Moore Williams The Star Wasps (1963)
- F-178 SF Donald A. Wollheim (ed.) More Adventures On Other Planets (1963)
- F-179 SF Edgar Rice Burroughs Pirates Of Venus (1963)
- F-180 SF Edgar Rice Burroughs Tarzan At The Earth's Core (1963)
- F-181 SF Edgar Rice Burroughs The Master Mind Of Mars (1963)
- F-182 SF Edgar Rice Burroughs The Monster Men (1963)
- F-183 SF Andre Norton The Defiant Agents (1963)
- F-184 WE Nelson C. Nye Death Valley Slim / The Kid From Lincoln County (1963)
- F-185 SF Jack Vance The Five Gold Bands / The Dragon Masters (1963)
- F-186 WE William O. Turner The High Hander / Louis Trimble Wild Horse Range (1963) (may be misprinted as F-185 on some copies)
- F-187 SF Leigh Brackett Alpha Centauri or Die! / G. MacDonald Wallis Legend of Lost Earth (1963)
- F-188 SF Philip Francis Nowlan Armageddon 2419 A.D. (1963)
- F-189 SF Edgar Rice Burroughs Tarzan The Invincible (1963)
- F-190 SF Edgar Rice Burroughs A Fighting Man Of Mars (1963)
- F-191 SF Jules Verne Journey To The Center Of The Earth (1963)
- F-192 SF Andre Norton Star Born (1963)
- F-193 SF Edgar Rice Burroughs The Son Of Tarzan (1963)
- F-194 SF Edgar Rice Burroughs Tarzan Triumphant (1963)
- F-195 SF Robert Silverberg The Silent Invaders / William F. Temple Battle on Venus (1963)
- F-196 WE Harry Whittington Dry Gulch Town / Prairie Raiders (1963)
- F-197 SF Andre Norton Witch World (1963)
- F-198 NA Simenon The Short Cases Of Inspector Maigret
- F-199 SF John Brunner (as Keith Woodcott) The Psionic Menace / Samuel R. Delany Captives of the Flame (1963)
- F-200 WE Tom West Triggering Texan / Brian Garfield (as Frank Wynne) The Big Snow (1963)
- F-201 SF Robert James Adam (as Paul Mactyre) Doomsday, 1999 (1963)
- F-202 NA Evelyn Berckman The Hovering Darkness (1963)
- F-203 SF Edgar Rice Burroughs The Beasts Of Tarzan
- F-204 SF Edgar Rice Burroughs Tarzan And The Jewels Of Opar (1963)
- F-205 SF Edgar Rice Burroughs Tarzan And The City Of Gold (1963)
- F-206 SF Edgar Rice Burroughs Jungle Tales Of Tarzan (1963)
- F-207 SF Andre Norton The Stars Are Ours!
- F-208 WE L. P. Holmes Side Me At Sundown / The Buzzards Of Rocky Pass
- F-209 SF Kenneth Bulmer The Wizard of Starship Poseidon / Poul Anderson Let The Spacemen Beware! (1963)
- F-210 SF Peter George (as Peter Bryant) Red Alert (1959)
- F-211 SF Otis Adelbert Kline Planet Of Peril (1963)
- F-212 SF Edgar Rice Burroughs Tarzan And The Lion Man
- F-213 SF Edgar Rice Burroughs The Land That Time Forgot (1963)
- F-214 WE Louis Trimble The Man From Colorado / Bill Burchardt The Wildcatters (1963)
- F-215 SF John Brunner Listen! The Stars / Jane Roberts The Rebellers (1963)
- F-216 SF Isaac Asimov The Man Who Upset The Universe (1963)
- F-217 SF William A. P. White (as Anthony Boucher) (ed.) The Best From Fantasy And Science Fiction, Eighth Series (1963)
- F-218 NA Allen Churchill They Never Came Back (1960)
- F-219 NA Henry Makow Ask Henry (1963)
- F-220 SF Edgar Rice Burroughs The People That Time Forgot (1963)
- F-221 SF Edgar Rice Burroughs Lost On Venus (1963)
- F-222 SF Jeff Sutton First On The Moon (1963)
- F-223 SF Keith Laumer Envoy to New Worlds / Robert Moore Williams Flight From Yesterday (1963)
- F-224 WE Nelson C. Nye Bancroft's Banco / The Seven Six-Gunners (1963)
- F-225 SF H. Beam Piper Space Viking (1963)
- F-226 SF Andre Norton Huon Of The Horn (1963)
- F-227 SF John Brunner The Astronauts Must Not Land / The Space-Time Juggler (1963)
- F-228 NA David Howarth We Die Alone (1963)
- F-229 MY Louis Trimble The Dead And The Deadly / Bob McKnight Homicide Handicap (1963)
- F-230 WE Tom West Lobo Lawman / Ray Hogan Trail Of The Fresno Kid (1963)
- F-231 SF Andre Norton Star Gate (1963)
- F-232 SF Edgar Rice Burroughs The Land Of Hidden Men (1963)
- F-233 SF Edgar Rice Burroughs Out Of Time's Abyss (1963)
- F-234 SF Edgar Rice Burroughs The Eternal Savage (1963)
- F-235 SF Edgar Rice Burroughs The Lost Continent (1963)
- F-236 SF Andre Norton The Time Traders
- F-237 SF A. Bertram Chandler The Ship From Outside / Beyond the Galactic Rim (1963)
- F-238 WE Stephen Payne Brand Him Outlaw / Gordon D. Shirreffs Quicktrigger (1963)
- F-239 SF Clifford D. Simak Time And Again (1963)
- F-240 SF H. G. Wells When The Sleeper Wakes (1963)
- F-241 SF Jack Williamson and James E. Gunn Star Bridge (1963)
- F-242 SF John Brunner The Rites of Ohe / Castaways World (1963)
- F-243 SF Andre Norton Lord Of Thunder (1963)
- F-244 WE Ray Hogan Last Gun At Cabresto / Edwin Booth Valley Of Violence (1962)
- F-245 SF Edgar Rice Burroughs Back To The Stone Age (1963)
- F-246 SF Thea von Harbou Metropolis (1963)
- F-247 SF Edgar Rice Burroughs Carson Of Venus (1963)
- F-248 SF Ray Cummings Beyond The Stars (1963)
- F-249 SF L. Sprague de Camp The Hand of Zei/The Search for Zei (1963)
- F-250 WE Barry Cord The Masked Gun / Tom West Gallows Gulch (1963)
- F-251 SF Philip K. Dick The Game-Players Of Titan (1963)
- F-252 WE J. C. Bayliss (as John Clifford) The Shooting Of Storey James (1964)
- F-253 SF Robert Silverberg (as Calvin M. Knox) One of Our Asteroids is Missing / A. E. van Vogt The Twisted Men (1964)
- F-254 WE Philip Ketchum The Ghost Riders / William Heuman Hardcase Halloran (1964)
- F-255 SF Philip E. High The Prodigal Sun (1964)
- F-256 SF Edgar Rice Burroughs Land Of Terror (1964)
- F-257 SF Fletcher Pratt Alien Planet (1964)
- F-258 SF Edgar Rice Burroughs The Cave Girl (1964)
- F-259 SF Otis Adelbert Kline Prince Of Peril (1964)
- F-260 WE Louis Trimble Trouble At Gunsight / Brian Garfield Trail Drive
- F-261 SF Samuel R. Delany The Towers of Toron / Robert Moore Williams The Lunar Eye (1964)
- F-262 WE Clifton Adams Reckless Men (1964)
- F-263 SF Andre Norton Web Of The Witch World (1964)
- F-264 WE Ben Elliott Contract In Cartridges / Tom West Don't Cross My Line (1964)
- F-265 SF Jack Vance The Houses of Iszm / Son of The Tree (1964)
- F-266 WE Allan Vaughan Elston Roundup On The Yellowstone
- F-267 SF Robert P. Mills (ed.) The Best From Fantasy And Science Fiction, 9th Series (1964)
- F-268 SF Edgar Rice Burroughs Escape On Venus (1964)
- F-269 SF J. H. Rosny Quest Of The Dawn Man (1964)
- F-270 SF Edgar Rice Burroughs The Mad King (1964)
- F-271 SF Edmond Hamilton Outside The Universe (1964)
- F-272 WE Ray Hogan The Man From Barranca Negra / Stephen Payne No Job For A Cowboy (1964)
- F-273 SF Marion Zimmer Bradley Falcons of Narabedla / The Dark Intruder (1964)
- F-274 SF H. Beam Piper The Cosmic Computer (1964)
- F-275 SF Philip E. High No Truce With Terra / Murray Leinster The Duplicators (1964)
- F-276 WE Brian Garfield (as Brian Wynne) Mr. Six Gun / William E. Vance The Wolf Slayer (1964)
- F-277 SF John Brunner To Conquer Chaos (1964)
- F-278 NA Frances Spatz Leighton Patty Goes To Washington (1964)
- F-279 SF Andre Norton (as Andrew North) Sargasso of Space
- F-280 SF Edgar Rice Burroughs Savage Pellucidar (1964)
- F-281 SF Pierre Benoit Atlantida (1964)
- F-282 SF Edgar Rice Burroughs Beyond The Farthest Star (1964)
- F-283 SF Arthur Sarsfield Ward (as Sax Rohmer) The Day The World Ended (1964)
- F-284 WE Lin Searles Border Passage / Ben Smith The Homesteader (1964)
- F-285 SF Fritz Leiber Ships to the Stars / Ken Bulmer The Million Year Hunt (1964)
- F-286 WE Jim Bosworth The Long Way North (1964)
- F-287 SF Andre Norton Key Out Of Time (1964)
- F-288 NA Hal Sherman Fishing For Laughs
- F-289 SF Kenneth Bulmer Demons' World / Tom Purdom I Want the Stars (1964)
- F-290 WE D. B. Olsen Night Of The Bowstring (1954)
- F-291 SF Andre Norton (as Andrew North) Plague Ship (1964)
- F-292 WE Gordon D. Shirreffs The Hidden Rider Of Dark Mountain / Tom West The Man At Rope's End (1964)
- F-293 SF E. C. Tubb Moonbase (1964)
- F-294 SF Otis Adelbert Kline The Port of Peril (1964)
- F-295 SF A. E. van Vogt The World Of Null-A
- F-296 SF Edwin L. Arnold Gulliver Of Mars (1964)
- F-297 SF Henry Kuttner Valley Of The Flame (1964)
- F-298 WE Nelson C. Nye Treasure Trail From Tucson / Sudden Country (1964)
- F-299 SF John Brunner Endless Shadow/ Gardner Fox The Arsenal of Miracles (1964)
- F-300 WE Brian Garfield Vultures in the Sun
- F-301 SF Philip K. Dick The Simulacra (1964)
- F-302 WE Brian Garfield (as Frank Wynne) Dragoon Pass
- F-303 SF Marion Zimmer Bradley The Bloody Sun
- F-304 SF Roger Sherman Hoar (as Ralph Milne Farley) The Radio Beasts (1964)
- F-305 SF Robert E. Howard Almuric (1964)
- F-306 SF C. L. Moore and Henry Kuttner Earth's Last Citadel (1964)
- F-307 SF Gardner F. Fox Warrior Of Llarn (1964)
- F-308 SF Andre Norton Judgment on Janus (1964)
- F-309 SF Philip K. Dick Clans of the Alphane Moon (1964)
- F-310 SF Andre Norton Galactic Derelict (1964)
- F-311 SF Donald A. Wollheim (ed.) Swordsmen in the Sky (1964)
- F-312 SF Roger Sherman Hoar (as Ralph Milne Farley) The Radio Planet
- F-313 SF Ray Cummings A Brand New World (1964)
- F-314 SF James H. Schmitz The Universe Against Her (1964)
- F-315 SF Andre Norton The Beast Master
- F-316 WE Robert McCaig The Burntwood Men (1964)
- F-317 SF James White The Escape Orbit (1965)
- F-318 SF Austin Hall The Spot Of Life (1965)
- F-319 SF Edmond Hamilton Crashing Suns (1965)
- F-320 SF John Brunner (as Keith Woodcott) The Martian Sphinx (1965)
- F-321 SF Otis Adelbert Kline Maza Of The Moon (1965)
- F-322 SF Samuel R. Delany City Of A Thousand Suns (1965)
- F-323 SF Andre Norton Daybreak - 2250 A.D.
- F-324 WE Brian Garfield Apache Canyon
- F-325 SF Andre Norton Ordeal In Otherwhere (1965)
- F-326 SF Lin Carter The Wizard Of Lemuria (1965)
- F-327 SF Henry Kuttner The Dark World (1965)
- F-328 SF Edward E. Smith The Galaxy Primes (1965)
- F-329 SF Andre Norton Storm Over Warlock (1965)
- F-330 SF Avram Davidson What Strange Stars And Skies (1965)
- F-331 NA Gahan Wilson Graveside Manner (1965)
- F-332 SF Andre Norton Three Against The Witch World (1965)
- F-333 SF L. Sprague de Camp Rogue Queen (1965)
- F-334 SF Rex Dean Levie The Insect Warriors (1965)
- F-335 SF Robert Moore Williams The Second Atlantis (1965)
- F-336 WE Ernest Hacox Six-Gun Duo (1965)
- F-337 SF Philip K. Dick Dr. Bloodmoney, Or How We Got Along After The Bomb (1965)
- F-338 NA Ace Crossword Puzzle Book No. 1 (1965)
- F-339 NA Arlene Hale Private Duty for Nurse Scott (1965)
- F-340 WE John L. Shelley and David Shelley The Relentless Rider (1965)
- F-341 NA Suzanne Roberts A Prize For Nurse Darci (1965)
- F-342 SF H. Beam Piper Lord Kalvan Of Otherwhen (1965)
- F-343 SF Ray Cummings The Exile Of Time (1965)
- F-344 SF Henry Kuttner The Well Of The Worlds (1965)
- F-345 SF Homer Eon Flint The Lord Of Death And The Queen Of Life (1965)
- F-346 SF John W. Campbell Jr. The Black Star Passes (1965)
- F-347 SF Ian Wright The Last Hope Of Earth (1965)
- F-348 WE Nelson C. Nye Guns Of Horse Prairie
- F-349 NA Suzanne Roberts Celebrity Suite Nurse (1965)
- F-350 SF Marion Zimmer Bradley Star Of Danger (1965)
- F-351 WE Louis Trimble The Holdout In The Diablos
- F-352 NA Arlene Hale Nurse On Leave (1965)
- F-353 SF Avram Davidson Rogue Dragon (1965)
- F-354 SF Gardner F. Fox The Hunter Out Of Time (1965)
- F-355 SF Homer Eon Flint The Devolutionist And The Emancipatrix (1965)
- F-356 SF Henry Kuttner The Time Axis (1965)
- F-357 SF Andre Norton Year Of The Unicorn (1965)
- F-358 WE William Vance The Wild Riders Of Savage Valley (1965)
- F-359 NA Sharon Heath Jungle Nurse (1965)
- F-360 WE L. L. Foreman Rawhiders Of The Brasada (1965)
- F-361 SF John Brunner The Day Of The Star Cities (1965)
- F-362 NA Suzanne Roberts The Two Dr. Barlowes (1965)
- F-363 SF Ray Cummings Tama Of The Light Country (1965)
- F-364 SF John W. Campbell Jr. The Mightiest Machine (1965)
- F-365 SF Andre Norton Night Of Masks (1965)
- F-366 SF Andre Norton The Last Planet
- F-367 SF Philip José Farmer The Maker Of Universes (1965)
- F-368 NA Arlene Hale Chicago Nurse (1965)
- F-369 NA Samuel A. Peeples (as Samuel Anthony Peeples) The Lobo Horseman (1965)
- F-370 WE Samuel A. Peeples (as Brad Ward) The Man From Andersonville (1965)
- F-371 NA Arlene Hale Camp Nurse (1965)
- F-372 SF Edward E. Smith Spacehounds of IPC (1966)
- F-373 SF Jack Jardine and Julie Anne Jardine (jointly as Howard L. Cory) The Sword Of Lankor (1966)
- F-374 SF Jeff Sutton The Atom Conspiracy (1966)
- F-375 SF Robert A. Heinlein The Worlds Of Robert A. Heinlein (1966)
- F-376 WE Lewis B. Patten The Odds Against Circle L (1966)
- F-377 SF Philip K. Dick The Crack In Space (1966)
- F-378 NA Mary Mann Fletcher Danger - Nurse At Work (1966)
- F-379 SF Frank Herbert The Green Brain (1966)
- F-380 WE Lee Hoffman The Legend Of Blackjack Sam (1966)
- F-381 NA Sharon Heath Nurse At Shadow Manor (1966)
- F-382 SF Brian W. Aldiss Bow Down To Nul (1966)
- F-383 SF Lin Carter Thongor Of Lemuria (1966)
- F-384 NA L. P. Holmes The Savage Hours (1966)
- F-385 NA Arlene Hale Emergency For Nurse Selena (1966)
- F-386 SF Andre Norton The Time Traders (1966)
- F-387 NA Arlene Hale Mountain Nurse (1966)
- F-388 SF Samuel R. Delany Babel-17 (1966)
- F-389 WE William Colt MacDonald Shoot Him On Sight
- F-390 SF James Holbrook Vance (as Jack Vance) The Languages of Pao (1966)
- F-391 SF Andre Norton The Crossroads of Time (1966)
- F-392 SF Emil Petaja Saga Of Lost Earths (1966)
- F-393 SF Roger Zelazny This Immortal (1966)
- F-394 NA Gail Everett Journey For A Nurse (1966)
- F-395 WE Nelson C. Nye Iron Hand
- F-396 SF Kenneth Bulmer Worlds For The Taking (1966)
- F-397 NA Willo Davis Roberts Nurse Kay's Conquest (1966)
- F-398 SF Eric Frank Russell Somewhere A Voice (1966)
- F-399 SF Gardner F. Fox Thief Of Llarn (1966)
- F-400 SF Otis Adelbert Kline Jan Of The Jungle (1966)
- F-401 WE Merle Constiner Outrage At Bearskin Forks (1966)
- F-402 SF Paul Linebarger (as Cordwainer Smith) Quest Of The Three Worlds (1966)
- F-403 SF Roger Zelazny The Dream Master (1966)
- F-404 WE Clifton Adams The Grabhorn Bounty (1966)
- F-405 NA Suzanne Roberts Vietnam Nurse (1966)
- F-406 SF Ray Cummings Tama, Princess Of Mercury (1966)
- F-407 SF Thomas Burnett Swann Day Of The Minotaur (1966)
- F-408 SF Andre Norton The Sioux Spaceman (1966)
- F-409 WE Lin Searles Cliff Rider (1966)
- F-410 NA Arlene Hale Lake Resort Nurse (1966)
- F-411 WE L. L. Foreman The Mustang Trail (1966)
- F-412 SF Philip José Farmer The Gates Of Creation (1966)
- F-413 NA Sharon Heath A Vacation For Nurse Dean (1966)
- F-414 SF Emil Petaja The Star Mill (1966)
- F-415 WE Brian Garfield (as Frank Wynne) The Bravos
- F-416 SF S. B. Hough (as Rex Gordon) Utopia Minus X (1966)
- F-417 NA Willo Davis Roberts Once A Nurse (1966)
- F-418 WE Nelson C. Nye Single Action (1967)
- F-419 NA Suzanne Roberts Rangeland Nurse (1967)
- F-420 SF Neil R. Jones Professor Jameson Space Adventure 1: The Planet Of The Double Sun (1967)
- F-421 SF Donald E. Westlake (as Curt Clark) Anarchaos (1967)
- F-422 SF Leigh Brackett The Sword Of Rhiannon (1967)
- F-423 WE Lewis B. Patten Giant On Horseback (1967)
- F-424 NA Arlene Hale Community Nurse (1967)
- F-425 SF Poul Anderson World Without Stars (1967)
- F-426 SF Gordon R. Dickson The Genetic General (1967)
- F-427 SF Samuel R. Delany The Einstein Intersection (1967)
- F-428 WE William Colt Macdonald Mascarada Pass (1967)
- F-429 SF Philip K. Dick The World Jones Made (1967)
- F-430 NA Arlene Hale Nurse On The Beach (1967)
