= Silkie =

Silkie or Silky may refer to:

- Silkie (chicken breed), a breed of domestic chicken
- Silkie, guinea pig of one specific variety
- Silkie, a character in Teen Titans
- Silkie, a mythical species, a.k.a. Selkie, that passes for both seal and human
- Silkie, a type of brownie (folklore) that dresses in grey silk
- Silkies, a superhuman race in The Silkie, a science fiction novel by A. E. van Vogt
- Silky, a character from the anime series I'm Gonna Be An Angel!
- Silky Nutmeg Ganache, American drag queen
- The Silkie, English folk group
- Silkie, English dubstep producer and DJ
- "Silkie", a song from the album Joan Baez, Vol. 2
- The Silkie (novel), a 1969 novel by A. E. Van Vogt

== See also ==
- Australian Silky Terrier, known in North America as a Silky Terrier
- Selkie (disambiguation)
