= F-313 =

F-313, F 313, F.313, F313 may refer to:

== Transport and vehicular ==
=== Aviation ===
- IAIO Qaher-313 (Persian: قاهر-۳۱۳, romanized: Qahir-313, lit. 'Conqueror-313'; also: Ghaher-313, Tamer-313, Q-313, "F-313"), an Iranian stealth fighter project and future unmanned aerial combat vehicle platform
- Royal Danish Air Force Aeromedical Biological Containment System unit F-313, an adapted Gulfstream III bizjet

=== Automotive ===
- Dallara F313, a 2010s open-wheel open-cockpit single-seat racecar for Formula 3
- Feeder Bus route 313 (F-313), Vasundhara Enclave, East Delhi, National Capital Territory, India
- New Taipei F313 bus route, Luzhou, Taipei, Taiwan; see List of bus routes in Taipei

=== Nautical ===
- HNoMS Helge Ingstad, a 21st-century Fridtjof Nansen-class frigate of the Royal Norwegian Navy
- HNoMS Draug (F313), a mid-20th-century Royal Norwegian Navy frigate, the former River-class frigate of the Royal Canadian Navy HMCS Penetang

=== Rail ===
- F313, a 1950s Victorian Railways F class (diesel) locomotive

== Other uses ==
- A Brand New World by Ray Cummings, published by ACE Books as volume F-313 in 1964; see List of Ace titles in F series
- The Restaurant de la Sirène at Asnières (F313), a painting by Vincent van Gogh

== See also ==
- 313 (disambiguation)
