= A Man Without a Soul =

A Man Without a Soul may refer to:

- "A Man Without a Soul", an early published version of Edgar Rice Burroughs's novel The Monster Men
- The Man Without a Soul, a version of Edgar Rice Burroughs's novel The Mucker
