= Darnay =

Darnay is a given name and a surname. People with the name include:

== Given name ==
- Darnay Scott (born 1972), American football wide receiver
- Darnay Holmes (born 1997), American football cornerback

== Surname ==
- Arsen Darnay (born 1936), Hungarian-American science fiction writer
- Toni Darnay (1921–1983), American actress and dancer
- Christiane Darnay Neckaerts, Belgian beauty queen

=== Fictional characters ===
- Charles Darnay, fictional character in A Tale of Two Cities by Charles Dickens
