= Selkie (disambiguation) =

A selkie is a mythological creature found in Faroese, Icelandic, Irish, and Scottish folklore.

Selkie may refer to:

- Selkie (film), a 2000 Australian film
- Selkies, an android race in the Final Fantasy Crystal Chronicles universe
- Selkie, Finland, a town in central-eastern Finland

== See also ==
- "Selkies: The Endless Obsession", song from Alaska by Between the Buried and Me
- Seelkee, a lake monster from Canada
- Silkie
