= Quest Crosstime =

1965 novel written by Andre Norton

- Cover of first edition
- Author: Andre Norton
- Cover artist: Yukio Tashiro
- Language: English
- Series: Blake Walker
- Genre: Science fiction
- Published: 1965 (The Viking Press)
- Publication place: United States
- Pages: 253 (Hardback edition)
- OCLC: 761231222
- Preceded by: The Crossroads of Time

Quest Crosstime is a science fiction novel by American writer Andre Norton, first published in 1965 by The Viking Press. The novel features the same characters of The Crossroads of Time.

== Main characters ==
- Blake Walker: taken to the alternate Earth of Vroom at the end of The Crossroads of Time, he has just completed his training and bears the rank of Apt Wardsman in the Crosstime Corps. Unlike the natives of Vroom, he has no teledynamic abilities, only very accurate forebodings of danger and a mind block that no telepath can penetrate.
- Com Varlt: Master Wardsman, who used the cover name Mark Kittson in The Crossroads of Time, is now Blake's commanding officer.
- Pague Lo Sige: Apt Wardsman, who used the cover name Stan Erskine in The Crossroads of Time, is Blake's colleague.
- Erc Rogan: a member of the Hundred, the ruling council of Vroom, which council oversees all crosstime travel.
- Marfy and Marva Rogan: Erc Rogan's twin daughters. They are telepaths with a deep connection to each other.
- Saur To'Kekrops: a member of the Hundred, is the stereotypical sociopath who wants to rule the world in order to compensate his feelings of inadequacy and uselessness. Frustrated by the subtle trade that the crosstime agents carry out, he wants to replace the Crosstime Corps with his own group, which will engage in blatant acts of piracy.

== Plot summary ==
While visiting with her sister a version of Earth on which life never began, Marva Rogan has gone missing. Her sister Marfy is certain that she is still alive, but is equally certain that she is no longer on that timetrack. Blake Walker, on his first solo mission as an Apt Wardsman, picks up Marfy to take her back to Vroom, succeeding in spite of someone having sabotaged his crosstime shuttle.

Based on clues found in Marva's personal possessions, Com Varlt decides to take a search team into a world in which Richard III won the Battle of Bosworth in 1485 and Cortez and Pizarro failed to subdue the Mesoamerican civilizations in the New World. In its twentieth century, the postcolonial Nation of New Britain and the Toltec Empire are engaged in cold war with each other across the Mississippi River, although intra-American trade does occur between the feuding powers. Varlt, Walker, Marfy, Pague Lo Sige, and several other agents disguise themselves as a team of licensed traders and make their way to the trade town of Xomatl.

Marfy locates Marva on the estate of a minor lord and she, Walker, and Lo Sige extract Marva from that estate, carrying her, wrapped in vines covered with fragrant flowers, off the estate during a ceremony in which guests are expected to ravish and plunder the estate's formal garden. The person driving the getaway van then takes the four of them to an isolated house, where they are rendered unconscious. When they wake up they discover that they have been taken to the lifeless Earth and abandoned to starve to death.

Using components salvaged from the ruined communications system, Lo Sige builds a device that will amplify the telepathic signals that he and the Rogan twins transmit and, he hopes, will send them to alternate timetracks. The device succeeds in attracting a rescuer, who takes the four strandees to a world where other wardsmen have come with their shuttles to avoid being captured by forces loyal to Saur To'Kekrops, the would-be dictator of Vroom.

With time running out, Walker goes to Vroom alone, allegedly to join To'Kekrops. He offers to lead a capture team to pick up Erc Rogan, To'Kekrops' most dangerous nemesis. Once back on the refuge world, Walker betrays To'Kekrops' men and leads his own team back to Vroom to confront To'Kekrops, the spider at the center of the web of treason. With a more powerful teledynamic amplifier, Lo Sige, Erc Rogan, his daughters, and another wardsman confront To'Kekrops and neutralize him. All that is left to do is to pick up the pieces and put the crosstime trading system back together again.

== Sources ==
- Barron, Neil (2004). Anatomy of Wonder: A Critical Guide to Science Fiction, 5th Edition. Westport, CT: Libraries Unlimited. Pg 322. ISBN 1-59158-171-0.
- Clute, John. "Norton, Andre". The Encyclopedia of Science Fiction. Eds. John Clute, David Langford, Peter Nicholls and Graham Sleight. Gollancz, 2 Apr. 2015. Web. 5 June 2015.
- Tuck, Donald H. (1974). The Encyclopedia of Science Fiction and Fantasy. Chicago: Advent. pg. 331. ISBN 0-911682-20-1.
