= The Mad King =

Novel by Edgar Rice Burroughs

- Dust jacket from the first edition of The Mad King
- Author: Edgar Rice Burroughs
- Language: English
- Genre: Ruritanian romance
- Publisher: A.C. McClurg
- Publication date: 1914 - 1915
- Publication place: United States
- Media type: Print (hardback)
- Pages: 296 (hardback edition)
- Preceded by: The Eternal Lover

The Mad King is a Ruritanian romance by American writer Edgar Rice Burroughs, originally published in two parts as "The Mad King" and "Barney Custer of Beatrice" in All-Story Weekly, in 1914 and 1915, respectively. These were combined for the book edition, first published in hardcover by A. C. McClurg in 1926.

== Plot summary ==
Set in the fictional European kingdom of Lutha, the protagonist is a young American named Barney Custer, of Beatrice, Nebraska, who is the son of an American farmer and a runaway Luthan princess, Victoria Rubinroth. Unaware of his royal blood, much less that he is a dead ringer for his relative Leopold, the current king of Lutha, Barney visits Lutha on the eve of the First World War to see for himself his mother's native land. As he arrives in Lutha, King Leopold has just escaped from his ten years' imprisonment at the hands of his scheming uncle, Prince Peter of Blentz. Much to his own and everyone else's confusion, Barney is naturally mistaken for the king, leading to numerous complications.

Barney meets and falls in love with Princess Emma Von Der Tann, Leopold's promised bride, and then becomes intimately involved in Luthan affairs, working to help the king and ultimately allowing himself to be proclaimed as king while impersonating Leopold to prevent Prince Peter from seizing the throne. He finally succeeds in foiling Peter's plans to become king himself by rescuing and fighting for the real king. Unfortunately, after his coronation, King Leopold discovers the shared love between Barney and Princess Emma, and Barney is forced to leave Lutha, mimicking the flight of his father years earlier, though his father left with a princess—Barney has only a soldier. Thus ends part one.

In the second part of the novel, the European skies are darkening as World War I has begun. In Lutha, King Leopold has proven himself to be a bad ruler and has not yet persuaded Princess Emma to marry him. In Nebraska, Barney's soldier friend leaves the farm to return to Lutha. Barney himself is attacked by one of Prince Peter's henchmen and he decides to return to Lutha as well. After an adventurous trip across war-torn Europe, which includes being mistaken for a spy by the Austrians and barely escaping a firing squad, Barney finally reaches Lutha, where he once again is forced to impersonate the king in order to save Lutha from the advancing Austrians. He makes a diplomatic alliance with Serbia, and defeats the Austrians in person, thereby saving Lutha. The real king Leopold, who has been his antagonist throughout the second part of the novel, is mistaken for Barney and killed by one of Prince Peter's henchmen. Barney then consents to remain as king of Lutha, married at last to Princess Emma.

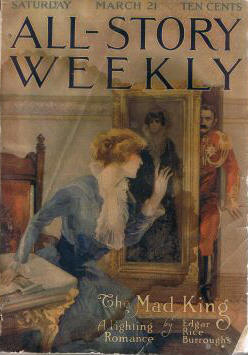
The Mad King was serialized in All-Story Weekly in 1914.

== Historical background ==
Unlike Anthony Hope's Ruritanian novels, The Mad King is set in a real world situation. Lutha's location is easy to find, as Burroughs describes it as being between Austria and Serbia. Lutha's circumstances mirror those of many Balkan nations forced to choose sides in the opening phase of the First World War. Burroughs also clearly chooses sides in the conflict, portraying Austria (and by extension her German allies) as the bad guys. Serbia is represented as being a good power.

At the time of writing and publication in 1914-15, developments in the actual war—where Serbia seemed able to hold its own in the fighting with the Austrians—made the book's ending plausible. This was, however, decisively changed by the entry of Bulgaria into the war; Serbia was completely overrun, devastated, and occupied until the end of the war. If Lutha were real, it would probably have shared Serbia's fate. If liberated from Austrian occupation in 1918, Lutha might have struggled to preserve independence and avoid incorporation in the new Kingdom of Yugoslavia. Had Lutha remained independent, having an American citizen on its throne might have come under close international scrutiny in the Versailles Conference.

== Interlude ==
The Eternal Lover—a collection of two novellas written in 1914/1915 and first published together in 1925—has as its protagonist Barney's sister Victoria Custer. These stories take place between Barney's two Luthan adventures, when he and his sister are the guests of Tarzan on the latter's African estate. When cave man Nu is released from suspended animation, Victoria discovers that she is the reincarnation of his great love Nat-ul. The story covers her adventures with Nu.

== Copyright ==
The copyright for this story has expired in the United States and, thus, now resides in the public domain there. The text is available via Project Gutenberg and Wikisource.
