= Axel Madsen =

American journalist

Axel Madsen (May 27, 1930 – April 23, 2007) was a Danish-American biographer and journalist.

Born in Copenhagen and raised in Paris, Madsen turned from music to writing in the early 1950s, initially for the Paris edition of the New York Herald Tribune. In 1956 he moved to Canada and began working for United Press International. He moved to Hollywood in the early 1960s and began writing biographies.

== Books ==
Madsen wrote on topics such as cross country truck drivers and the CBS news magazine "60 minutes". He was best known for his biographies of Hollywood celebrities, fashion pioneers, and business titans. Biographies included Billy Wilder, Barbara Stanwyck, Coco Chanel, Greta Garbo, John Jacob Astor, Jacques Cousteau, Yves St. Laurent, André Malraux, Jean-Paul Sartre, Simone de Beauvoir, William C. Durant, William Wyler, and John Huston. In 1980, he wrote a science fiction novel called Unisave.

Partial list of books published:

- 1969 : Billy Wilder
- 1973 : William Wyler: the authorized biography
- 1975 : The new Hollywood; American movies in the '70s
- 1977 : Hearts and minds : the common journey of Simone de Beauvoir and Jean-Paul Sartre
- 1976 : Malraux : a biography
- 1978 : John Huston: a biography
- 1979 : Living for design : the Yves Saint Laurent story
- 1980 : Private power : multinational corporations for the survival of our planet
- 1980 : Unisave
- 1982 : Open road : truckin' on the biting edge
- 1984 : 60 Minutes: The Power and Politics of America’s Most Popular TV News Show
- 1986 : Cousteau : an unauthorized biography
- 1989 : Gloria and Joe
- 1989 : Silk roads: : the Asian adventures of Clara and André Malraux
- 1989 : Sonia Delaunay: artist of the lost generation
- 1990 : Coco Chanel : a biography
- 1995 : Stanwyck: A Biography
- 1996 : The Sewing Circle : Hollywood's greatest secret : female stars who loved other women
- 1999 : The deal maker : how William C. Durant made General Motors
- 2001 : John Jacob Astor : America's first multimillionaire
- 2002 : The Marshall Fields

== Family ==
Madsen was married to Midori.

== Death ==
He died of pancreatic cancer in Los Angeles at the age of 76.
