= A Far Sunset =

1967 novel by Edmund Cooper

- First US edition
- Author: Edmund Cooper
- Language: English
- Genre: Science fiction
- Published: 1967
- Publisher: Hodder & Stoughton (UK); Walker & Company (US)
- Publication place: England
- Pages: 189
- ISBN: 0-340-04364-4
- OCLC: 463957

A Far Sunset is a science fiction novel by Edmund Cooper, published by Hodder & Stoughton in July 1967 in the UK and by Walker and Company that year.

== Plot summary ==
The starship Gloria Mundi, built and crewed by the United States of Europe, lands on the planet Altair Five in the year 2032. When part of the crew ventures out to explore the region around their touchdown point, their radio communication soon ceases and they do not return. Three of the crew sent to rescue their mates vanish within hours. Of the three remaining, all of whom are captured after they finally leave the ship in search of the missing, only psychiatrist Paul Marlow, the book's protagonist, survives. The planet is inhabited by primeval humanoids.

A central theme in the novel is the clash between Marlowe's rational worldview and the indigenous peoples' superstitious and often brutal culture. His name is pronounced Poul Mer Lo by the Bayani tribe he lives amongst; he gains a leading position in the primitive society.

Marlow eventually goes on a journey which has the result of demystifying the natives' religion by discovering its factual origin - thereby uncovering that the humans of Altair Five share their ancestry with humans of Earth and of other worlds in the Milky Way.

When he returns from this journey, he is raised to the most powerful position within the society. Marlow uses this power to educate the alien race; he introduces them to writing, to transforming Earth inventions such as the wheel, the ball-bearing and the axle, and to better industrial and agricultural methods.

While throughout his stay on this world, Marlow has longed to go home, he reaches a point where he adapts to the simplicity and naivety of the Bayani lifestyle, and starts seeing the complexities of Earth as absurd. When, after less than three Altair Five years, he is contacted by a starship and rescue is imminent, he decides to stay in spite of a specific fate which awaits him.

== See also ==
- Lest Darkness Fall
