= The Silent Invaders =

1963 science fiction novel by Robert Silverberg

- First edition
- Author: Robert Silverberg
- Cover artist: Ed Valigursky
- Language: English
- Genre: Science fiction
- Publication place: United States
- Media type: Print (hardback & paperback)

The Silent Invaders is a science fiction novel by American author Robert Silverberg, first published as a paperback Ace Double in 1963, which reissued it as a stand-alone volume in 1973; a Tor paperback appeared in 1985. The novel was expanded from a novelette which first appeared in Infinity Science Fiction in 1958.

== Plot summary ==
The novel is set in a future in which Earth is a rising galactic power. Two older starfaring species, the Darruu and the Medlins, are ancient enemies, and both have concluded that their respective survivals will require enlisting Earth on their side in the conflict. To this end, both have dispatched agents (surgically altered to pass for human) to infiltrate Earth and manipulate public opinion and politics. Major Abner Harris is a Darruu agent freshly arrived on Earth, who coincidentally encounters a Medlin agent. When his attempt to kill her fails and she has him at her mercy, she confounds him by letting him live. Harris eventually discovers that the Medlin presence on Earth has been subverted; their agents have allied themselves with a secret group of human mutants, who are evolving toward transcendence. The latest generation of the latter are fully conscious and telepathic even in the womb, and the Medlin agents have accepted them as the natural superiors and successors of all three species. Harris must choose whether he will side with his hatefully nationalistic Darruu superiors or with the Medlin and human mutant cabal, which requires that he kill all the Darruu agents known to him in cold blood as his price of admission.

== Reception ==
Foundation, reviewing the 1975 edition, stated that it had been "inflicted" on readers, and expressed gratitude that Silverberg's skills as a writer had developed in the intervening years.

Galactic Journey praised the worldbuilding, but criticized "Silverberg's immature style" and overall "amateur quality to the writing", noting that the "emotions don't ring true", and ultimately concluding that the plot "just isn't big enough for two big revelations".
