= Unisave =

Unisave is a novel by Axel Madsen published in 1980.

== Plot summary ==
Unisave is a novel set in the future in which the overpopulation of the world has become a critical problem.

== Reception ==
Greg Costikyan reviewed Unisave in Ares Magazine #3 and commented that "Despite the potentially intense emotional nature of his subject material, the novel progresses slowly and unemotionally. His one attempt at a dramatic scene fails to communicate any real feeling of drama, and his characters are uniformly bland, almost clones of one another. An remarkable novel to which I have devoted too much space."

== Reviews ==
- Science Fiction Review 36 (August 1980)
