= Octagon (novel) =

1981 novel by Fred Saberhagen

First edition (publ. Ace Books)

Octagon is a novel by Fred Saberhagen published in 1981.

== Plot summary ==
Protagonist Alex Barrow discovers that his opponents in the science fiction play-by-mail game Starweb are being murdered.

== Reception ==
Greg Costikyan reviewed Octagon in Ares Magazine #11 and commented that "Octagon is a good mystery novel which explores a rather interesting theme: the idea that a clever programmer can manipulate records and programs in our computer-based world to his own ends."

Dave Langford reviewed Octagon for White Dwarf #68, and stated that "it's a pleasant thriller with the computer-moderated RPG Starweb getting uncomfortable as players are eliminated not by strategy but by assassination. I recommend this technique to Diplomacy addicts. The villain's identity is obvious long before the story reveals it, but it's all quite tense nevertheless."

== Reviews ==
- Review by Tom Easton (1982) in Analog Science Fiction/Science Fact, March 1, 1982
- Review by Tom A. Jones (1985) in Vector 127
