= The Eternal Lover =

Novel by Edgar Rice Burroughs

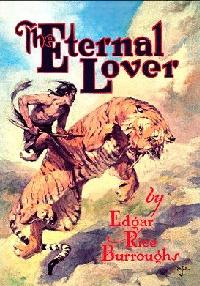
- Dust cover from the first edition.
- Author: Edgar Rice Burroughs
- Cover artist: J. Allen St. John
- Language: English
- Genre: Fantasy, Lost world
- Publisher: A. C. McClurg
- Publication date: October 1925
- Publication place: United States
- Media type: Print (hardback)
- Pages: 316
- Followed by: The Mad King

The Eternal Lover is a fantasy-adventure novel by American writer Edgar Rice Burroughs. The story was begun in November 1913 under the working title Nu of the Niocene. It was first run serially in two parts by All-Story Weekly. The first part, released March 7, 1914 was titled "The Eternal Lover" and the second part, released in four installments from January 23, 1915 to February 13, 1915 was titled "Sweetheart Primeval". The book version was first published by A. C. McClurg on October 3, 1925.

In 1963, Ace Paperback published a version under the title The Eternal Savage. An E-Text edition has been published by Edgar Rice Burroughs, Inc. and is available online.

== Plot summary ==
A cliff-dwelling warrior of 100,000 years ago, Nu, is magically transported to the present, falls in love with Victoria Custer of Beatrice, Nebraska, the reincarnation of his lost lover Nat-ul, and the two are transported back to the Stone Age. The story is set in Africa, and the present-day sequences include Victoria's brother Barney Custer, protagonist of Burroughs's Ruritanian novel The Mad King, as well as Burroughs's iconic hero Tarzan from his Tarzan novels.

== Publication ==
While the four Custer sibling novellas were first published in an alternating fashion; chronologically-speaking, the events of the two halves of The Eternal Lover/Savage occur between the two halves of The Mad King.

Publication order:

- "The Eternal Lover" (The Eternal Lover Part 1) All-Story Weekly, March 7, 1914
- "The Mad King" (The Mad King Part 1) All-Story Weekly March 21, 1914
- "Sweetheart Primeval" (The Eternal Lover Part 2) All-Story Weekly, Jan.–Feb. 1915
- "Barney Custer of Beatrice" (The Mad King Part 2) All-Story Weekly, August 1915

== Other Media ==
In 2013, Edgar Rice Burroughs, Inc., began a paid webcomic on their official website, by Martin Powell (script) and Steven E. Gordon (art).

== Copyright ==
All four novellas—as they were serialized in All-Story Weekly—are in the public domain in the United States.
