= Dennis Schmidt (author) =

American novelist (1939–2003)

Dennis Arthur Schmidt
- Born: January 30, 1939; Illinois, United States
- Died: May 29, 2003 (aged 64); Spokane, Washington, United States
- Occupation: Novelist
- Writing career
- Period: 1978–1990
- Genres: science fiction and fantasy

Dennis Schmidt was an American science fiction and fantasy author who published from 1978 to 1990. He published his ten novels in three series. He was known for incorporating elements of Zen philosophy and martial arts into space opera and fantasy plots.

== Publications ==
Kensho (series): A series of martial arts stories taking place on a distant world.

- Way-Farer, Ace Books, 1978
- Kensho, Ace Books, 1979
- Satori, Ace Books, 1981
- Wanderer, Ace Science Fiction Books, 1985

Twilight of the Gods (trilogy): A series of fantasy novels.

- The First Name, 1985
- Groa's Other Eye, 1986
- Three Trumps Sounding, 1987

The Questioner Trilogy

- Labyrinth, 1989
- City of Crystal Shadow, 1990
- Dark Paradise, 1990
