= The Monster Men =

1913 novel by Edgar Rice Burroughs

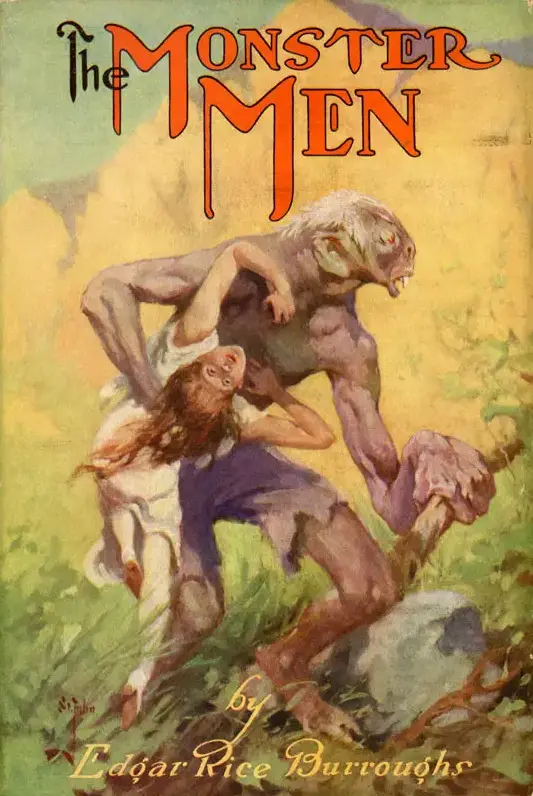
- Dust-jacket illustration.
- Author: Edgar Rice Burroughs
- Illustrator: J. Allen St. John
- Cover artist: J. Allen St. John
- Language: English
- Genre: Science fiction
- Publisher: A. C. McClurg
- Publication date: 1929
- Publication place: United States
- Media type: Print (Hardback)
- Pages: 304

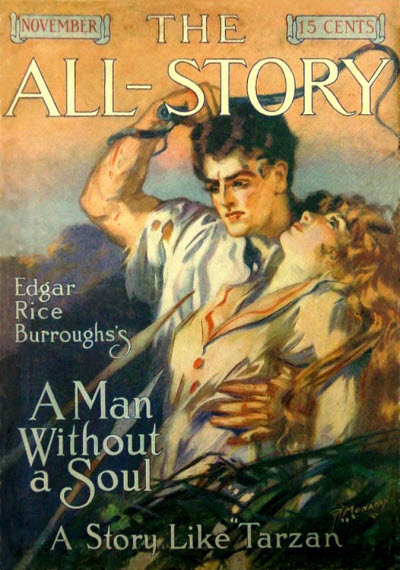
A shorter version of The Monster Men was published in All Story Magazine in 1913 as "A Man Without a Soul".

The Monster Men is a 1913 science fiction novel by American author Edgar Rice Burroughs, written under the working title "Number Thirteen". It first appeared in print under the title of "A Man Without a Soul" in the November, 1913 issue of All-Story Magazine, and was first published in book form in hardcover by A. C. McClurg in March, 1929 under the present title. It has been reissued a number of times since by various publishers. The first paperback edition was issued by Ace Books in February 1963.

The book features prominently the theme of a scientist trying to create an artificial human being, familiar from the classic Frankenstein.

== Plot summary ==
Cornell University professor Arthur Maxon, who has been experimenting in the creation of artificial life, travels with his daughter Virginia to one of the remote Pamarung Islands in the East Indies to pursue his project. Their departure is noted with interest by a young man, Townsend J. Harper, Jr., who is quite taken with Virginia and determines to find out where they are going. In Singapore, Maxon commissions Dr. Carl von Horn to take them the remainder of the way to their destination in his yacht the Ithaca, and then to assist him in his experiments. On the island the group fights off a pirate attack and builds a fort.

Maxon and von Horn begin their experiments, growing several living creatures in chemical vats, humanoid but mindless and ugly. Maxon hopes Experiment Number Thirteen will result in a perfect human being, and in his fanatic obsession plans to wed Virginia to this ultimate creation. Von Horn retains a more realistic viewpoint and hopes to marry her himself, leading to friction. Meanwhile, locals including Budadreen, one of von Horn's crewmen, and Muda Saffir, leader of the pirates, conspire against the scientists, who they believe are hiding treasure. They are watched closely by Chinese cook Sing Lee, who recognizes the pirate.

Experiment Number Thirteen indeed appears to result in a physically perfect man, but as soon as the scientists discover this an emergency distracts them. Experiment Number One has escaped and abducted Virginia. Maxon, von Horn and Sing Lee pursue the monster, only to find it dead at the hands of Number Thirteen, also escaped from the lab in the wake of the scientists’ departure. Thinking Virginia still in danger, von Horn attacks the creature and is nearly killed himself, but is spared by Thirteen when Virginia pleads for his life. Ignorant of the handsome stranger's origin, the girl finds herself attracted to him.

Maxon and von Horn return Thirteen to the lab and begin educating him. Von Horn privately discloses to Virginia Maxon's plan to wed her to one of his creatures, while concealing it is her rescuer to whom she is to be wed. Separately, he informs Thirteen of his artificial origin. Both recipients of his confidences are horrified. Thirteen, or Bulan, as he is now called, is convinced that he is a soulless monster and that Maxon must be stopped.

Von Horn absconds with Virginia while Bulan goes to confront Maxon, while Budadreen and six crewmen steal a chest they believe holds Maxon's wealth. Muda Saffir's pirates attack the compound and appropriate the chest. Bulan, reconsidering his rage, defends Maxon and Sing Lee against the pirates. Virginia rebuff's von Horn's advances and falls in with Budadreen, who takes her captive and sails off in von Horn's yacht. Von Horn, since his effort to turn Bulan against Maxon has failed, releases the other eleven monsters against them. Bulan overawes the creatures and gains control of them, but Maxon, apparently regaining his sanity, turns on him and drives him away.

The Ithaca is wrecked in a gale, and Budadreen and his men swept overboard; later the drifting hulk is boarded by headhunters. Bulan and the eleven monsters search for Virginia and find the yacht in the harbor, when it is boarded by Muda Saffir's pirates, the monsters attack them. Saffir takes Virginia and flees the battle in his prahu; the monsters, capturing another prahu, pursue them.

Having witnessed these events from hiding, von Horn returns to Maxon, who offers him his fortune and Virginia if he can save her. Bulan and his monsters overtake and fight the pirates in Borneo, resulting in six monsters and many of the pirates killed, but Saffir, still holding Virginia, escapes up river in his boat. The monsters join with Barunda and a crew of captive Dayaks and resume pursuit. Meanwhile, Saffir has bungled a rape attempt against Virginia and been shoved overboard by her; his lieutenant Ninaka assumes command. He stops at a native village, hides the chest and Virginia, and when Bulan arrives conspires with Barunda to have the natives lead him astray. He then recovers his contraband and continues up river; Virginia ultimately escapes by diving off the boat.

Meanwhile, Von Horn, Maxon and Sing Lee sail to Borneo, encounter the Ithaca, and enlist the Dayaks to take them to Muda Saffir. The latter, having survived his dip in the drink, flags them down. He and von Horn make a secret deal and continue up river without Maxon, who is stricken with fever. Bulan's band, lost, encounters an orangutan band after fighting off more Dayaks. Finding one of them has captured Virginia, they fight the apes. Von Horn, Muda Saffir and a group of native warriors happen on the battle and spirit off the unconscious Virginia; Sing Lee, following, sees all. Von Horn's group and Sing Lee go back to Maxon, who is recovering. Von Horn presses his suit with Virginia.

Ninaka and Barunda fall out; Barunda is murdered, but this drives Ninaka ashore. Ninaka buries the chest lest it encumber his escape. Von Horn and a couple of Dayaks, returned from delivering Virginia to her father, witness this. Afterwards von Horn kills his companions to keep the secret of the treasure to himself and flees back down river, narrowly missing Muda Saffir heading the other way with two war prahus; Saffir has again abducted Virginia. She escapes again and falls in with Bulan and his surviving monsters; spotted by the pirates, they flee, one of the monsters dying to cover the retreat while Bulan carries Virginia to safety. Making his stand in a small canyon, he casts boulders down on their pursuers until they retreat. He promises the girl he will take her back to her father, but soon after is stricken with a fever. She tends him in his delirium.

Maxon, von Horn, and Sing Lee search for Virginia, and come across the two just as Bulan's fever breaks. Von Horn shoots Bulan, but Sing Lee disarms him, stopping him from finishing him off. Von Horn finally reveals to Virginia that Bulan is Number Thirteen, but she decides she loves Bulan regardless. Then Sing Lee declares Bulan is not a monster after all, but an amnesiac he had found drifting in a lifeboat and substituted for Maxon's failed experiment. He then exposes the crimes of von Horn, who flees into the jungle. An American naval vessel arrives; it turns out to be seeking von Horn, a deserter, to arrest him. The pursuit finally ends at the site of the buried "treasure," which von Horn has dug up; his headless body is found next to the opened chest. It had contained books, not treasure, and von Horn's native accomplices were evidently upset.

The Maxons and Bulan leave Borneo on the navy ship, and Bulan's memory returns. He is conveniently revealed as Townsend Harper, the wealthy (and single) young man who took an interest in Virginia at the beginning of the book. Wedding bells are plainly not far off.

== Critical reception ==
Galaxy columnist Floyd C. Gale, discussing the 1963 reprints, said that "although this book suffers from some of Burroughs's worst writing, there is still a lot of excitement in his tale".
