= The Silkie (novel) =

1969 novel by A.E. van Vogt

First edition, published by Ace Books. Cover art by Jack Gaughan.

The Silkie is a fix-up science fiction novel by Canadian-American writer A. E. van Vogt, first published in complete form in 1969. The component stories had previously been published in Galaxy Science Fiction magazine.

== Plot introduction ==
Taking its inspiration from the Celtic legend of the Selkie, the novel describes a race of apparent humans with the ability to change into other forms. One, like the Selkie of legend, can live underwater. Another can survive and travel unprotected in outer space. In all three forms the Silkies can wield mental powers over energy to some degree.

After a prologue which purports to explain the origin of the Silkies as an experiment in genetic manipulation, the action moves forward over a hundred years to a future in which the Silkies are numerous and live on Earth. Humanity has assimilated them by means of the Special People, who can establish telepathic rapport with the Silkies. All Silkies are male, and most are married to women of the Special People. They are employed as police in space, and most are comfortable with that role. One dedicated Silkie, Nat Cemp, encounters three different alien races, and with each encounter he gains more powers and learns more about the true nature of the Silkies, and of the Universe.

As with other Van Vogt works, the novel introduces a psychological element similar to general semantics. Here the Silkies use the so-called "Logic of Levels". Instead of the symbol/reality dichotomy of General Semantics, the Logic of Levels substitutes the concept of behaviors and instincts as complex neurological structures and feedback loops, more complex levels being built on simpler ones. By manipulating these complexes with their powers the Silkies can defeat adversaries, who find themselves caught in self-amplifying feedback from their own instincts and desires.

== Plot summary ==
The novel has four sections. The prologue was created specifically for the book; each of the remaining sections consists of a story previously published as part of a series.

=== Prologue to the Silkie ===
A young woman, eking out an existence with her father on a boat moored somewhere in Haiti, learns of a medical man with a possible secret of eternal youth. Suspecting a swindle, but keen to get close to any source of money, she joins the various elderly expatriates in a trek to Echo Island, where the supposed genius, Dr. Sawyer, is living. Instead she is confronted with a young man who emerges from swimming underwater, transforming from a fish-like form to human as he does so. He identifies himself as the product of Sawyer's work, and tells her that he and Sawyer need women to bear his children. The story concludes with him saying, "I'm a Silkie. The first Silkie."

=== The Silkie ===
Nat Cemp, a Silkie travelling through space under his own power, is hailed by a ship full of Variants. These are the result of further experimentation on the Silkie genome. Each has Silkie abilities to some degree. This particular ship consists mostly of aquatic Variants. Cemp is conducted into the ship, shifting from his hard, bony, space-travelling form into his aquatic shape as he does so.

Cemp meets a powerful boy aged about 10 who claims to be his son. Since Silkies have to return to water to breed every 9.5 years, and are not allowed to meet their children afterwards, the boy's claim is credible. He tells Cemp that he wishes to return to Earth to learn how to tame his unusual powers.

Cemp agrees to this, even though it means he himself will not be allowed to return to Earth as he needs to, in order to complete another breeding cycle. However, after Cemp contacts Earth and then leaves the ship, the boy reveals himself to be a malevolent shape-shifting alien.

Cemp returns to Earth clandestinely in order to see his wife Joanne, but finds that the alien has taken on her form and is waiting in his house. The alien, known as the Kibmadine, displays Silkie-like control over energy during the fight which occurs after Cemp discovers the deception. The alien flees.

With the aid of the main computer at Silkie Authority, Cemp analyzes his own sense-impressions of the Kibmadine. The result is a picture of a race which enters into an erotic-cannibalistic relationship with its victims, taking on their shapes and then consuming them. Armed with this, Cemp meets the Kibmadine and uses Logic of Levels to send it into an amplified memory of the previous victims. Taking on the shape of the former race, the alien then consumes itself.

=== Silkies in Space ===
Silkies all across Earth are confronted by apparent doubles of themselves, who then flee as space-travelling Silkies. Cemp traces them to an asteroid making a close approach to the Sun, inside which is a mysterious power which both controls these new Silkies and also gives them abilities that Cemp and the Earth Silkies cannot match.

On the asteroid is a complete population of Silkies, both male and female, who can take on any shape, unlike Earth Silkies. This discovery threatens the relationship between Silkies and humans, especially between Silkies and their wives. Apparently the story of Dr. Sawyer was a fraud, intended to allow Silkies to live on Earth after the asteroid first approached the Sun. On subsequent returns the space Silkies had to deal with the discovery of the Special People and the creation of Variants. The latest return is part of a long-term plan.

However, just as the Earth authorities come to an agreement with the space Silkies and the unknown power behind them, a new force encloses the Earth and drags it from orbit. Cemp manages to escape, only to find the Earth now reduced in size and mounted as a trophy inside the asteroid. The being in the asteroid, known as the Glis, seems to come from an ancient time when the laws of nature were different. The Glis openly threatens to destroy all Silkies if Cemp moves against it, as the asteroid moves many light-years from the Sun. Cemp, however, finds the Logic of Levels key to the Glis's true nature and trips a feedback which forces it out of its state of retarded development, into the next phase. The Glis becomes a huge pink star, liberating thousands of planets from its collection to orbit around it. Many are dead, having been in storage for too long, but on the liberated Earth mere seconds have passed and all are well. Now humanity and the space Silkies must learn to co-exist on an Earth which is part of a huge new Solar System.

=== Enemy of the Silkies ===
While exploring the new planets, one of the Earth Silkies is killed by an unknown force. Cemp tries to investigate, but meets hostility from the other space Silkies. It is possible the victim recognized the nature of the attacker before dying, out of some ancient racial memory.

Cemp eventually confronts a powerful alien called a Nijjan, which seems to be able to manipulate time and space itself. Using one of the Glis's weapons, he survives the encounter, but Nijjans begin kidnapping Silkies and Special People from Earth. Alarmingly, this means they learn the Logic of Levels, one of the few weapons which might work against them.

Cemp learns that each Nijjan lives alone on a planet, ruling its people like a god. Like the Glis, the Nijjans seem to come from an ancient time, when time and space were plastic and could be ruled by Will. Pushing his shape-shifting abilities, Cemp is able to take on the form of the Nijjans. Using Logic of Levels, he starts a sequence of reactions in them which infects each one and passes to another Nijjan along the communication links they maintain. The self-destruction caused by this collapses reality itself, until Cemp's awareness is the only thing left in existence. Cemp realizes that, while in the form of a Nijjan, he can imagine any kind of Universe and bring it into being. He decides to imagine one without the Nijjans, the Glis or the Kibmadine. He restores the Earth to its place in orbit around the Sun, also decides to make all humans into Silkies, abolishing the divisions threatening to tear the Earth apart. He then enters this universe and re-joins his people, and especially his wife.
