= Arsen Darnay =

Hungarian-American science fiction writer

Arsen Julius Darnay (born July 31, 1936 in Budapest) is a Hungarian-American science fiction writer.

Darnay emigrated to the United States in 1953. His first science fiction stories were published in Galaxy Science Fiction in 1974–75, after being purchased by editor Jim Baen; Mike Ashley has estimated that of all Baen's discoveries, Darnay was "the most prolific (...) at least for the next four years before he moved on to become a management consultant."

== Critical reaction ==
In 1976, Darnay was a finalist for the John W. Campbell Award for Best New Writer. His works were twice finalists for the Locus Award for Best Novella.

Kirkus Reviews described Darnay as a "diamond in the rough".

== Novels ==
- A Hostage for Hinterland (1976)
- Karma (St. Martin's Press, 1978). Also published as The Karma Affair (Ace Books, 1979).
- The Siege of Faltara (1978)
- The Purgatory Zone (1981)
- Ghulf Genes (2009)
- In Search of Anna Magna (2009)
