= Thomas Burnett Swann =

American poet

- Born: October 12, 1928
- Died: May 5, 1976 (aged 47)
- Occupations: Poet; Critic; Author
- Writing career
- Genres: Fantasy, science fiction, poetry, literary criticism

Thomas Burnett Swann (October 12, 1928 – May 5, 1976) was an American poet, critic and fantasy author. His criticism includes works on the poetry of H.D. and Christina Rossetti. Swann died of cancer and several of his novels were published posthumously.

== Poetry ==
Swann's poetry consists largely of short, whimsical pieces evoking a naive innocence. Many of them were later incorporated into his novels and placed in the mouths of his characters – sometimes the same poem is spoken by two or three different characters in novels set centuries and continents apart.

Poets also frequently appear as characters in his novels, always on the side of good: Sappho in Wolfwinter (1972); Robert Herrick in Will-o-the-Wisp (1977, serialized 1974); a fictionalized Charles Sorley in The Goat Without Horns (1971); and Thomas Chatterton in The Not-World (1975).

== Fiction ==
=== Science fiction ===
Swann began writing fiction in 1958 with "Winged Victory", a science fiction story based on the famous headless statue known as the Winged Victory of Samothrace. In Swann's story the statue's head is discovered and found to have been modeled upon an alien visitor whom the sculptor took for a goddess.

Extraterrestrials also feature in "The Painter", in which the painter Hieronymous Bosch is abducted by hideous aliens and forced to paint them, thereby providing the inspiration for the grotesque images in his painting The Garden of Earthly Delights. This and many other early stories appeared in the British magazine Science Fantasy. Some stories also appeared in The Magazine of Fantasy & Science Fiction (F&SF).

=== Fantasy ===
Most of Swann's fiction was outright fantasy. The early story "The Dryad-tree" is set in contemporary Florida and features a woman's reaction to the knowledge that her new husband's garden contains a tree possessed by a jealous dryad. The story was adapted as a short film in 2017.

The bulk of Swann's fantasy fits into a rough chronology that begins in ancient Egypt around 2500 BC and chronicles the steady decline of magic and mythological races such as dryads, centaurs, satyrs, selkies and minotaurs. The coming of more "advanced" civilisations constantly threatens to destroy their pre-industrial world, and they must continually seek refuge wherever they can. They see the advent of Christianity as a major tragedy; the Christians regard magic and mythological beings as evil and seek to destroy the surviving creatures, although some manage to survive and preserve some of their old ways through medieval times down to the late 19th century and perhaps even the 20th.

=== Sexuality as a topic ===
An undercurrent of sexuality runs through all of these stories. Many of Swann's characters are sexually adventurous and regard sexual repression as spiritually damaging. Casual and sometimes permanent nudity is common. Homosexual relationships between both male and female characters are often hinted at, although seldom made explicit.

The most openly homosexual relationship in Swann's stories is also the most controversial. His novel How Are the Mighty Fallen (1974) depicts the Biblical Jonathan and David as lovers, and furthermore suggests that Jonathan was himself a member of an ancient winged half-human race. The book appeared from Swann's regular publisher DAW Books, but only after DAW's founder and chief executive Donald A. Wollheim fought to prevent distributor New American Library from banning it. However, Swann was reportedly unhappy with George Barr's cover artwork, which showed two of the characters being chased by a cyclops, because he felt it misrepresented the style of the novel.

== Works (excluding non-fiction and poetry) ==
=== The Minotaur Trilogy ===
(Written in reverse order. Swann claimed that he would correct the inconsistencies between the two earlier books if there was a second edition, but in the event there was not.)

- Cry Silver Bells (1977)
- The Forest of Forever (1971)
- Day of the Minotaur (1966; previously serialized in 1964–1965 as The Blue Monkeys in Science Fantasy)

The three novels were collected as The Minotaur Trilogy (1997)

=== The Latium Trilogy ===
(Not Swann's title; also written largely in reverse)

- Queens Walk in the Dusk (1977)
  - Formerly Swann's rarest novel, only published in a limited edition of 2000 copies. It has since been reprinted in both hardcover and paperback editions.
- Green Phoenix: The Last Stand of the Prehumans (1972; based on the novella "Love Is A Dragonfly" published in The Magazine of Fantasy & Science Fiction March 1972)
- Lady of the Bees (1976; expanded from the 1962 Science Fantasy story "Where is the Bird of Fire?")

=== Others ===
- The Weirwoods (1967; serialized in Science Fantasy 1965)
- Moondust (1968)
- The Goat Without Horns (1971)
- Wolfwinter (1972)
- How Are the Mighty Fallen (1974)
- Will-o-the-Wisp (1976; serialized in Fantastic in 1974); the book seems to have been typeset directly from the magazine, resulting in part of the synopsis of part 1 being erroneously included in the book. The cover design, depicting a woman riding a giant insect, also seems to have been inspired by the cover of the magazine issue containing part 1, although this actually had no connection with Swann's story.
- The Not-World (1975)
- The Gods Abide (1976)
- The Tournament of Thorns (1976, assembled from two stories in F&SF; The Manor Of Roses [1966] and The Stalking Trees [January 1973])
- The Minikins of Yam (1976). This novel's prologue is printed before the title page, opposite the inside front cover where promotional text would normally be placed.

=== Short story collections ===
- The Dolphin and the Deep (1968)
- Where is the Bird of Fire? (1970)
