= The Green Brain =

1966 novel by Frank Herbert

- Cover of first edition (paperback)
- Author: Frank Herbert
- Cover artist: Gerald McConnell
- Language: English
- Genre: Science fiction
- Publisher: Ace Books
- Publication date: 1966
- Publication place: United States
- Media type: Print (hardback & paperback)
- Pages: 160 pp

The Green Brain (1966), initially published as Greenslaves, is a science fiction novel by American writer Frank Herbert.

== Plot introduction ==
The book is set in the not-so-distant future, where humankind has all but succeeded in controlling all life on the planet and almost completely wiping out all insect life. The Earth is divided into a "Green Zone" which humans totally dominate (or so they believe) and a diminishing "Red Zone" that is not yet conquered.

The "Green Brain" of the title is an intelligent organism that embodies and arises from nature's resistance to human domination. It is able to command social insects to form humanoid-shaped collective organisms which it uses to infiltrate the "Green Zone".

The book is about a small team sent into the jungles of Brazil to investigate the problem, who find out that some of their assumptions were wrong.

== Reception ==
David Pringle described the novel as "a giant-insect story, full of grotesquerie and done with verve". Pringle rated the novel two stars out of four.

== Adaptation ==
By the time of Herbert's death, arrangements also had been made to make a movie adaptation of the novel.
