= The Crossroads of Time =

1956 novel by Andre Norton

- First edition
- Author: Andre Norton
- Cover artist: Robert Schulz
- Language: English
- Series: Crosstime
- Genre: Science fiction
- Published: 1956 (Ace Books)
- Publication place: United States
- Media type: Print (Paperback)
- Pages: 169 (Paperback edition)
- OCLC: 904427840
- Followed by: Quest Crosstime

The Crossroads of Time is a science fiction novel by American writer Andre Norton, first published in 1956 by Ace Books as one of their double novels. The story takes its protagonist through several versions of Earth as it might have been if history had gone differently. The book has been translated into Spanish, Italian, and German.

== Premise ==
In a twist on the theme of time travel, Norton has her characters traveling across time, rather than forward or backward. The dates do not change as the men travel from one timeline to another, but the histories of those worlds differ from each other.

== Main characters ==
- Blake Walker: Main protagonist who accidentally becomes part of the book's plot. Found abandoned in an alley at age two, he discovers growing up that certain forebodings of danger always come true.
- Mark Kittson (real name Com Varlt): Leader of a team of crosstime agents.
- Jason Saxton (Horman Tilis): The senior member of Kittson's team.
- Stan Erskine (Pague Lo Sig), Hoyt (Fal Korf): Other members of Kittson's team.
- Kmoat Vo Pranj: Chief antagonist, psychopath/sociopath who wants to rule the world. Sometimes disguised as petty crook Lefty Conners.

== Plot summary ==
In the fall of 1955, in New York City, as the snow begins to fall, Blake Walker has come from Ohio to attend college. Goaded by one of the forebodings that have punctuated his life, he rescues a man from a kidnapper and then discovers that the kidnapper's friends have taken an unhealthy interest in him. The man he rescued, Mark Kittson, arranges for him to disappear into an organization that occupies a hidden apartment. There he meets the other members of Kittson's team, Jason Saxton, Stan Erskine, and Hoyt.

The next day, alone in the apartment, Blake hears someone trying to break in. At the same time he is subjected to a telepathic assault that knocks him out. When he regains consciousness he tells Kittson and the others what happened. Kittson explains to him that he and the others are agents from an alternate Earth, one more advanced technologically and psychically than is Blake's Earth. They are hunting a criminal, Kmoat Vo Pranj, who may have been Blake's assailant. Discerning that their hideout has been discovered and may be subject to a police raid, the men move their operation to another safehouse, picking up a stray kitten that Hoyt begins to train telepathically.

As he returns to the house from a local drug store, Blake is kidnapped by gangsters working for Pranj and taken to Pranj's hideout. There he is thrown into a dark cellar with a timid petty crook named Lefty Conners. Searching the cellar for a way out, the two men come upon a square platform that has a rod like a crowbar jutting up from it. Lefty tries to pull the rod loose and activates a mechanism that takes the platform and both men into a laboratory on an alternate Earth.

As he explores the building above the laboratory Blake becomes trapped. He manages to escape and discovers that Lefty is really Pranj. He returns to the weird vehicle in the laboratory and activates it just as one of the world's natives shoots him in the left shoulder with a heat ray. The vehicle then takes Blake to a world in which Manhattan is a bleak landscape dotted with stone towers and patrolled by carnivorous hag-like creatures accompanied by giant robot centipedes.

Escaping from that world and trying to get back to his own world, Blake comes to a similar one, a world in which Nazi Germany won the Battle of Britain, Operation Sea Lion went ahead in May 1940 and the Axis subsequently launched an invasion of the United States. As a consequence of this sequence of events, civilization has collapsed and New York has been bombed into ruins. As he confronts one of the natives, the carrier activates itself and vanishes. The native takes him to Sarge, a benign dictator whose group has colonized Central Park and hopes to restore some measure of civilization on Manhattan after they have cleared out the "hiders", the criminal element that preys upon them. Sarge tells Blake about a shadowy character called Ares, who appears to be organizing the hiders, and Blake assumes that it is Pranj, using his psychic abilities to control the lesser men.

Believing that Kittson and his team will eventually come to this world, Blake leads a team to the location of the safehouse, pointing out the drug store on the way so that some of the men can scavenge its contents. At the house the men find evidence of a recent visit and they leave Blake and one young man to wait. Warned by his sense of foreboding, Blake pushes the young man into the garage just as the booby-trapped house explodes. Blake takes the injured man to the drug store to hole up for the night and wait for the rest of Sarge's men to return.

The next day Kittson and his team show up. They hope to capture Pranj at a mass meeting of the hiders, where Pranj intends to hand out advanced weapons. Sarge's men show up as well and a battle rages. Blake and the others thwart Pranj's plan, leaving the battle to be won by Sarge. They return to Blake's original timeline to find Hoyt and Pranj locked in a psychic duel, a true battle of wills. With reinforcement Hoyt wins the battle and the men capture Pranj. Because Blake knows too much he is obliged to accompany the men to their home timeline.

== Sources ==
- Clute, John. "Norton, Andre." The Encyclopedia of Science Fiction. Eds. John Clute, David Langford, Peter Nicholls and Graham Sleight. Gollancz, 2 Apr. 2015. Web. 12 June 2015.
- Tuck, Donald H. (1974). The Encyclopedia of Science Fiction and Fantasy. Chicago: Advent. pg. 331. ISBN 0-911682-20-1.
