= Ray Cummings =

American writer

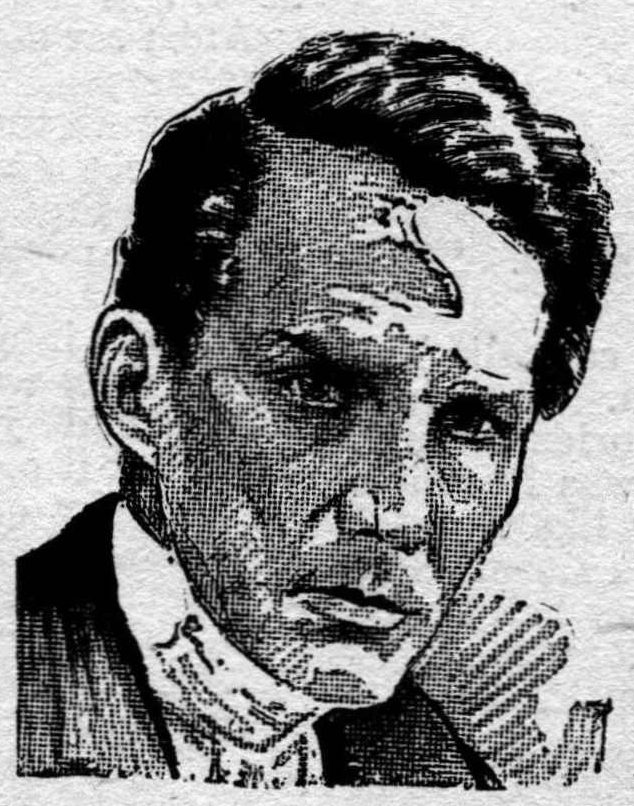
- Born: Ray King Cummings; August 20, 1887; New York City, New York
- Died: January 23, 1957 (aged 69); Mount Vernon, New York, U.S.
- Writing career
- Genre: Science fiction

Ray Cummings (born Raymond King Cummings) (August 30, 1887 – January 23, 1957) was an American author of science fiction literature and comic books.

== Early life ==
Cummings was born in New York City in 1887. He worked with Thomas Edison as a personal assistant from 1914 to 1919, where he arranged phonograph record albums and wrote labels for Edison Records. Facsimiles of his signature appear on many of the labels.

== Literary career ==
Cummings is identified as one of the "founding fathers" of the science fiction genre. His most highly regarded fictional work was the novel The Girl in the Golden Atom published in 1922, which was a consolidation of a short story by the same name published in 1919 (where Cummings combined the idea of Fitz James O'Brien's The Diamond Lens with H. G. Wells's The Time Machine) and a sequel, The People of the Golden Atom, published in 1920.

Before taking book form, several of Cummings's stories appeared serialized in pulp magazines. The first eight chapters of his The Girl in the Golden Atom appeared in All-Story Magazine on March 15, 1919.

Ray Cummings wrote in "The Girl in the Golden Atom": "Time . . . is what keeps everything from happening at once", a sentence repeated by scientists such as C. J. Overbeck, and John Archibald Wheeler, and often misattributed to the likes of Einstein or Feynman. Cummings repeated this sentence in several of his novellas. Sources focus on his earlier work, The Time Professor, published in 1921, as its earliest documented usage.

== Later work ==
During the 1940s, with his literary career in eclipse, Cummings anonymously scripted comic book stories for Timely Comics, the predecessor to Marvel Comics. He recycled the plot of The Princess of the Atom for a two-part Captain America tale, Princess of the Atom (Captain America Comics #25 & 26). He also contributed stories to the Human Torch and Sub-Mariner, which his daughter Betty Cummings often penned.

Cummings died on January 22, 1957, at Mount Vernon, New York, of a cerebral hemorrhage.

== Selected literary works ==
- The Girl in the Golden Atom, short story (1919)
- The People of the Golden Atom (1920)
- Moon Plot (Argosy c. 1920)
- The Girl in the Golden Atom, novel (1922)
- The Man Who Mastered Time (Argosy 1924)
- A Brand New World (Argosy 1928)
- Snow Girl (Argosy 1929)
- The Shadow Girl (Argosy 1929)
- The Sea Girl (Argosy 1929)
- The Princess of the Atom (1929)
- Tama of the Light Country (Argosy 1930)
- Beyond the Vanishing Point, Astounding (March 1931)
- Brigands of the Moon (McClurg, 1931)
- Jungle Rebellion (Argosy 1931)
- Tama, Princess of Mercury (Argosy 1931)
- Bandits of the Cylinder (Argosy 1931)
- Beyond the Stars, Future (February 1942)
- He who served, (1954)

== Gallery ==
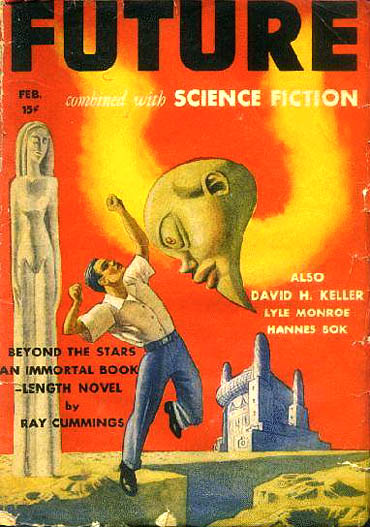
Cummings's novel Beyond the Stars was reprinted in the February 1942 issue of Future under a cover by Hannes Bok.

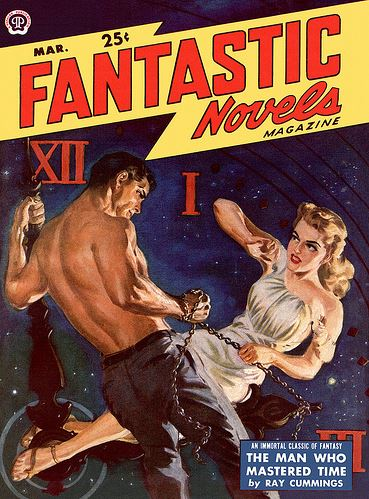
The Man Who Mastered Time was republished in Fantastic Novels in 1950.

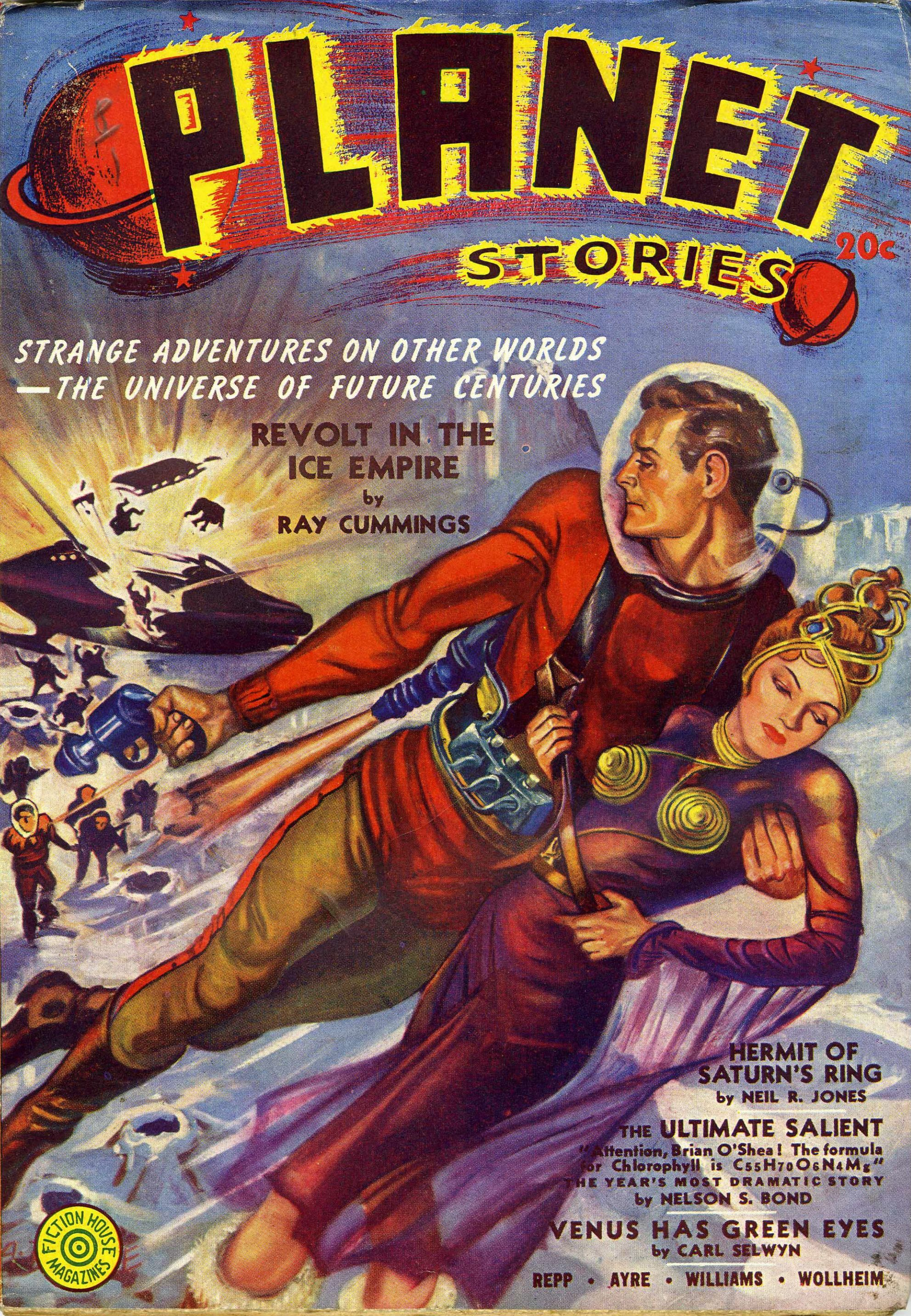
Cummings had the title story for the Fall 1940 issue of Planet Stories
