= Almuric =

1939 novel by Robert E. Howard

- Cover of the first edition
- Author: Robert E. Howard
- Cover artist: Jack Gaughan
- Language: English
- Genre: Science fiction
- Publisher: Ace Books
- Publication date: 1964
- Publication place: United States
- Media type: Print (Paperback)
- Pages: 157
- OCLC: 5821930

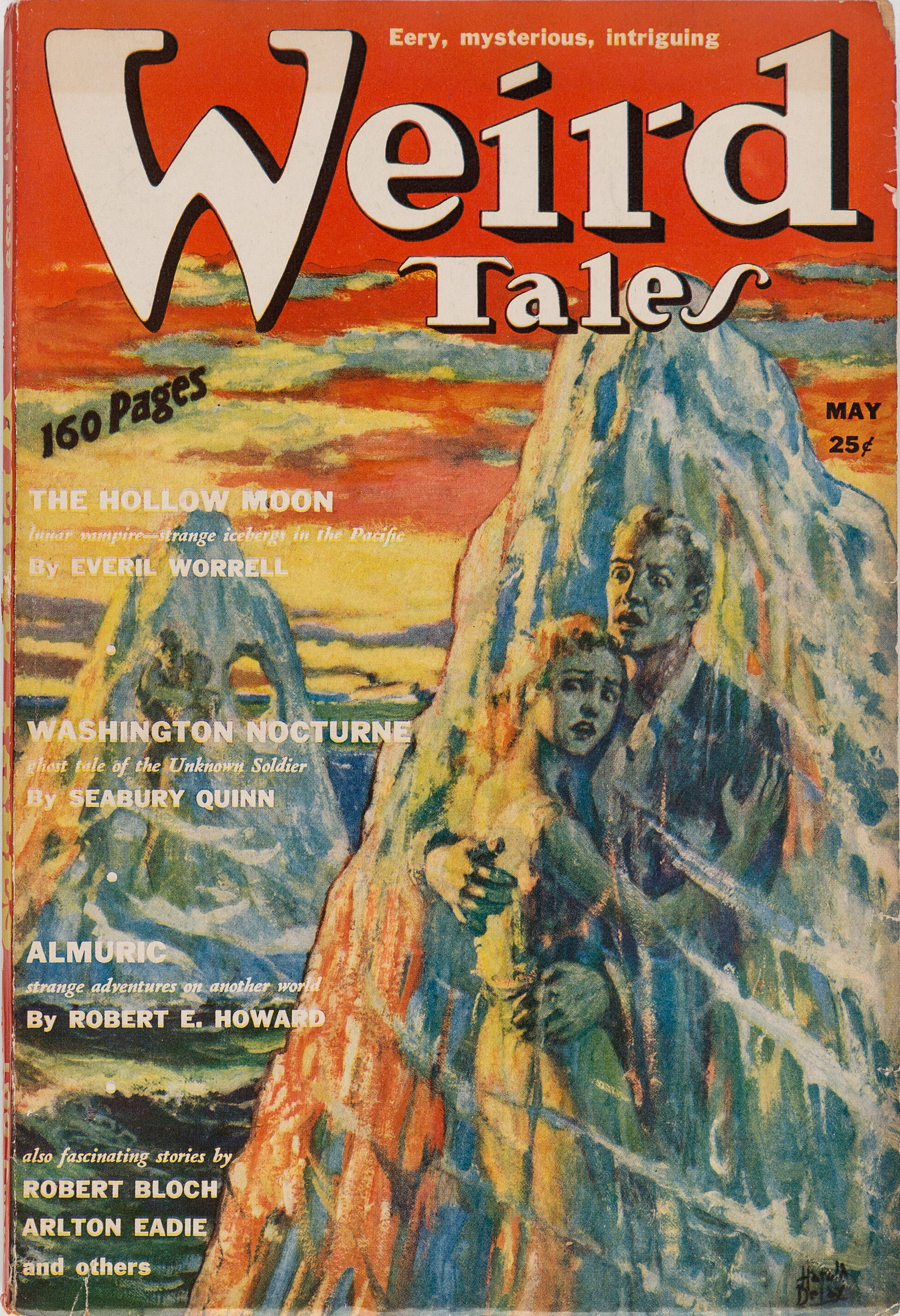
Almuric was serialized in Weird Tales, beginning in the May 1939 issue.

Almuric is a planetary romance novel by American writer Robert E. Howard. It was originally serialized in three parts in the magazine Weird Tales beginning in May 1939. The novel was first published in book form in 1964 by Ace Books. The novel shares similar elements with the John Carter of Mars series by Edgar Rice Burroughs.

== Premise ==
Esau Cairn, a misfit in modern America who "belongs in a simpler age" is exploited by a corrupt political boss whom he finally kills with his bare hands, Cairn must flee. A sympathetic scientist helps him get through space to a world known as Almuric, by unspecified scientific methods. There he finds a life to which he is more fitted, encountering both frightening monsters as well as beautiful women. Cairn becomes known as Iron Hand due to his powerful punches and boxing skills.

== Plot ==
Almuric is a planetary romance penned in the Burroughsian style. Its hero is Esau Cairn, an old-fashioned boxer hopelessly incompatible with the modern American society. When a crooked politician tricks him into complicity, Cairn is overcome with blind rage and thrashes the politician to death. Realizing there is no future for him on Earth, Cairn asks help from a scientist friend, who teleports him to the recently discovered alien planet of Almuric, a savage but habitable world in another universe.

Lone and naked, Cairn must gather and hunt his food and battle various bizarre animals. Eventually he stumbles upon the native people of Almuric, the Guras, who are hairy, ape-like men with a violent but pragmatic way of life. They live in great fortified cities and wage endless wars against each other, carbine and sword being their weapons of choice. Cairn begins to enjoy this new, simpler and truer existence, and his strength and fighting prowess earn him the nickname Ironhand.

The Gura women are not apish at all but resemble human women; for the male Guras endure all hardships and evolved to be powerful and animalistic, while female Guras are shielded from hardship and evolved to be soft and beautiful. Cairn falls in love with a beautiful Gura female Altha, whose temperament and worldview are the most human-like of all Guras.

Yagas are a black-skinned race of winged men, and sempiternal enemies of the Guras. Every now and then they raid Gura cities in search of new slaves to torture and cannibalize. Cairn and Altha are captured by Yagas and taken to their "black citadel of Yugga, on the rock Yuthla, by the river of Yogh, in the land of Yagg". The Yaga queen Yasmeena attempts to seduce Cairn, who declines and escapes. Discovering a secret tunnel unknown to most Yagas, Cairn returns to the Guras and persuades them to stop infighting and unites them against a common enemy.

Cairn leads a combined army of Gura warriors to Yugga through the secret tunnel, taking the Yagas by surprise. Seeing her people defeated, Yasmeena unleashes "the ultimate horror", a monstrous slug with dozens of spark-emitting and flame-flashing tentacles, but Cairn manages to defeat the abomination. The surviving Gura warriors, as well as 50,000 freed slave-women, return to the Gura homeland. Cairn takes Altha as his wife. The two decide to do what they can to pacify the quarrelsome Gura, making life on Almuric somewhat more civilized.

== Comic ==
In 1980, Marvel Comics' magazine Epic Illustrated published a comic book adaptation of the story, a limited series in four parts written by Roy Thomas and drawn by Tim Conrad over issues #2-5. It was later reprinted in graphic album form by Dark Horse Comics in 1991, and a 4 issue sequel was done by Dark Horse Comics: Ironhand of Almuric.

== Authorship ==
There is some question as to whether Howard was the actual author of the novel. It was not published until after his death and some speculate that it was written by his editor, Otis Adelbert Kline, and published as Howard's. Some of the writing, and the ending in particular, seem inconsistent with Howard's previous work. It may be that Howard created a draft for such a story that was later completed by another writer.

== Publication history ==
- 1939, US, Weird Tales, Pub date May, July, August 1939, magazine serialization in 3 parts
- 1964, US, Ace Books F-305 OCLC 5821930, Pub date 1964, Paperback, first book publication
- 1975, US, Donald M. Grant, Publisher, Inc. OCLC 1367492, Pub date 1975, Hardback
