= Andre Norton bibliography =

These works were written or edited by the American fiction writer Andre Norton (Andre Alice Norton, born Alice Mary Norton, 1912–2005). Before 1960 she used the pen name Andrew North several times and, jointly with Grace Allen Hogarth, Allen Weston once. (Note: Works first published as by Andrew North or Allen Weston may have been reissued, or issued in collections, as by Andre Norton. Such publication with alternative authorial credit is not noted here.)

Norton is known best for science-fiction and fantasy, or speculative fiction, a field where her work was first published in the 1950s. She also wrote crime fiction, romantic fiction, and historical fiction, mainly before 1960. The term non-genre distinguishes that other work here, which expresses the perspective of the Internet Speculative Fiction Database (ISFDB).

== Single titles ==
- The Prince Commands, being sundry adventures of Michael Karl, sometime crown prince & pretender to the throne of Morvania (D. Appleton–Century Company, 1934; republished by Open Road Media, 2014, ISBN 9781497656574), illustrated by Kate Seredy – nongenre
- Ralestone Luck (Appleton–Century, 1938 OCLC 1133318), illus. James Reid – nongenre – complete text via Standard Ebooks
- Follow the Drum, being the ventures and misadventures of one Johanna Lovell, sometime lady of Catkept manor in Kent county of Lord Baltimore's proprietary of Maryland, in the gracious reign of King Charles the Second (New York: William Penn Publishing Corp., 1942, OCLC 6143183) – nongenre
- Rogue Reynard (Houghton Mifflin, 1947, OCLC 1709667), chapterbook, illus. Laura Bannon – nongenre
- Scarface, being the story of one Justin Blade, late of the pirate isle of Tortuga, and how fate did justly deal with him, to his great profit (Harcourt, Brace, 1948, OCLC 6707170), illus. Lorence Bjorklund – nongenre
- Huon of the Horn, being a tale of that Duke of Bordeaux who came to sorrow at the hands of Charlemagne and yet won the favor of Oberon, the Elf King, to his lasting fame and great glory (Harcourt, Brace, 1951, OCLC 1216996), illustrated by Joe Krush – "Based upon the English translation by Sir John Bourchier, Lord Berners, as it appears in the publications of the Early English Text Society."
- Star Man's Son, 2250 A.D. (Harcourt, Brace, 1952, OCLC 190248), illus. Nicholas Mordvinoff – (also issued 1954 as Daybreak: 2250 A.D., as an Ace Double with Beyond Earth's Gates by Lewis Padgett; reissued 1978 as Star Man's Son)
- Murders for Sale (1954; reissued 1992 as Sneeze on Sunday; republished by Wildside Press in 2011, ISBN 9781434449894), by Norton and Grace Allen Hogarth as Allen Weston – nongenre
- Yankee Privateer (World Pub. Co., 1955, OCLC 1499269), illus. Leonard W. Vosburgh – nongenre
- Stand to Horse (1956) – nongenre
- Sea Siege (1957)
- Star Gate (1958)
- Secret of the Lost Race (1959, as an Ace Double with One Against Herculum by Jerry Sohl; reissued 1977 as Wolfshead)
- Shadow Hawk (1960) – nongenre (set during the reign of Sekenenre III)
- The Sioux Spaceman (1960, as an Ace Double with And Then the Town Took Off by Richard Wilson, reissued 1966 as standalone)
- Star Hunter (1961, as an Ace Double with Voodoo Planet)
- Eye of the Monster (1962, as an Ace Double with Sea Siege)
- The X Factor (1965)
- Operation Time Search (1967)
- Bertie and May (1969), with Bertha Stemm Norton – nongenre
- High Sorcery (1970), collection
- Android at Arms (1971)
- Garan the Eternal (1972), collection
- Breed to Come (1972)
- Here Abide Monsters (1973)
- The Many Worlds of Andre Norton (1974), collection, edited by Roger Elwood; also issued as The Book of Andre Norton
- Iron Cage (1974)
- Outside (Walker & Co., 1974), chapterbook, illus. Bernard Colonna
- The Day of the Ness (Walker, 1975), chapterbook by Norton and Michael Gilbert, illus. Michael Gilbert
- The White Jade Fox (1975)
- Merlin's Mirror (1975)
- No Night Without Stars (1975)
- Knave of Dreams (1975)
- Wraiths of Time (1976)
- Perilous Dreams (1976), collection
- The Opal-eyed Fan (1977) – nongenre
- Velvet Shadows (1977) – nongenre
- Yurth Burden (1978)
- Seven Spells to Sunday (1979), with Phyllis Miller
- Snow Shadow (1979) – nongenre
- Voorloper (1980), illus. Wojciech Siudmak, and Alicia Austin
- Iron Butterflies (1980) – nongenre
- Maid at Arms (1981), with Enid Cushing (Norton not named on the cover)
- Ten Mile Treasure (1981) – nongenre
- Moon Called (1982)
- Caroline (1983), with Enid Cushing – nongenre
- Wheel of Stars (1983)
- House of Shadows (1984), with Phyllis Miller
- Stand and Deliver (1984) – nongenre, sequel to Yankee Privateer
- Ride the Green Dragon (1985), with Phyllis Miller – nongenre
- Serpent's Tooth (Andre Norton, Ltd., 1987), chapterbook, illus. Mary Hanson-Roberts – limited edition of 999 copies
- Moon Mirror (1988), collection, illus. Yvonne Gilbert
- The Jekyll Legacy (1990), with Robert Bloch
- Sneeze on Sunday (1992), with Grace Allen Hogarth, mystery
- Brother to Shadows (1993)
- Tiger Burning Bright (1995), with Marion Zimmer Bradley and Mercedes Lackey
- The Monster's Legacy (1996)
- Three Hands for Scorpio (2005)

== Series ==
=== Astra, or Pax ===
A sequence of two novels, starting with the first interstellar flight made by humans escaping a tyrannical civilization on Earth.

- The Stars Are Ours! (1954; reissued 1955 as an Ace Double with Three Faces of Time by Sam Merwin, Jr.)
- Star Born (1957; reissued 1958 as an Ace Double with A Planet for Texans by H. Beam Piper and John J. McGuire) – complete text via Project Gutenberg

=== Beast Master (Hosteen Storm) ===
The story of ex-soldier Hosteen Storm and his companions, a group of genetically altered animals with whom he has a telepathic connection.

- The Beast Master (1959)
- Lord of Thunder (1962)
- Beast Master's Ark (2002), with Lyn McConchie
- Beast Master's Circus (2004), with Lyn McConchie
- Beast Master's Quest (2006), with Lyn McConchie

=== Cycle of Oak, Yew, Ash, and Rowan ===
Also known as The Book of Oak, Yew, Ash, and Rowan.

- To the King a Daughter: The Book of the Oak (2000), with Sasha Miller
- Knight or Knave: The Book of the Yew (2001), with Sasha Miller
- A Crown Disowned: The Book of the Ash and the Rowan (2002), with Sasha Miller
- Dragon Blade: The Book of the Rowan (2005), with Sasha Miller
- Knight of the Red Beard (2008), with Sasha Miller

=== Carolus Rex ===
- The Shadow of Albion (1999), with Rosemary Edghill
- Leopard in Exile (2001), with Rosemary Edghill

=== Central Asia ===
Two books by Norton and Susan Shwartz.

- Imperial Lady: A Fantasy of Han China (1989)
- Empire of the Eagle (1993)

=== Central Control ===
Military SF in a milieu where humans are initially only permitted out into the wider universe as mercenaries.

- Star Rangers (1953; also issued 1955 as Ace Double The Last Planet with A Man Obsessed by Alan E. Nourse)
- Star Guard (1955; also issued 1956 as Ace Double with Planet of No Return by Poul Anderson)

=== Crosstime (Blake Walker) ===
A young time-traveler attempts to stop a tyrant from conquering all of reality.

- The Crossroads of Time (1956, as an Ace Double with Mankind On the Run by Gordon R. Dickson; first published alone in 1962)
- Quest Crosstime (1965; also issued as Crosstime Agent, UK, 1975)

=== Drew Rennie ===
Westerns starring a former Confederate soldier.

- Ride Proud, Rebel! (1961) – complete text via Project Gutenberg
- Rebel Spurs (1962) – complete text via Project Gutenberg

=== Elvenbane, or the Halfblood Chronicles ===
The Halfblood Chronicles fantasy series by Norton and Mercedes Lackey.

- The Elvenbane (1991, ISBN 0312851065)
- Elvenblood (1995, ISBN 0312855486)
- Elvenborn (2002, ISBN 0812571231)
- Elvenbred (TBD, but likely cancelled due to copyright issues following Norton's death in 2005)

=== Five Senses ===
Loosely connected fantasies, each concentrating on one of the five senses.

- The Hands of Lyr (Touch) (1994)
- Mirror of Destiny (Sight) (1995)
- The Scent of Magic (Smell) (1998)
- Wind in the Stone (Hearing) (1999)
- A Taste of Magic (Taste) (2006) with Jean Rabe

=== Lorens Van Norreys ===
About a Dutch espionage agent during and after World War II.

- The Sword is Drawn (Houghton Mifflin, 1944, OCLC 2685438), illus. Duncan Coburn
- Sword in Sheath (Harcourt, Brace, 1949, OCLC 4163524), illus. Lorence Bjorklund (published in the UK as Island of the Lost, 1953)
- At Swords' Points (Harcourt, Brace, 1954, OCLC 1287331)

=== The Magic Sequence ===
- Steel Magic (1965; also issued as Gray Magic, 1967)
- Octagon Magic (1967)
- Fur Magic (1968)
- Dragon Magic (1972)
- Lavender-Green Magic (1974)
- Red Hart Magic (1976)
- Dragon Mage: A Sequel to Dragon Magic (2008), by Norton and Jean Rabe

=== Mark of the Cat ===
- The Mark of the Cat (1992)
- Mark of the Cat, Year of the Rat (2002) – The Mark of the Cat packaged with a new and related novel

=== Quag Keep ===
Part of the Greyhawk campaign setting for Dungeons & Dragons.

- Quag Keep (1979)
- Return to Quag Keep (2005), Norton and Jean Rabe

=== Star Ka'at ===
Four novels by Norton and Dorothy Madlee.

- Star Ka'at (1976)
- Star Ka'at World (1978)
- Star Ka'ats and the Plant People (1979)
- Star Ka'ats and the Winged Warriors (1981)

=== The Time Traders (Ross Murdock) ===
Time agents Ross Murdock and Travis Fox travel through time and space to safeguard Earth.

- The Time Traders (1958)
- Galactic Derelict (1959)
- The Defiant Agents (1962)
- Key Out of Time (1963)
- Firehand (1994), with P. M. Griffin
- Echoes in Time (1999), with Sherwood Smith
- Atlantis Endgame (2002), with Sherwood Smith

=== Trillium, or World of the Three Moons ===
Only the third book was written solely by Norton; the first book was a collaboration of Norton, Marion Zimmer Bradley and Julian May. The other books are included here for completeness but had no input from Norton. For further details see Trillium series.

- Black Trillium (1990), with Marion Zimmer Bradley and Julian May
- Blood Trillium (1993), by Julian May
- Golden Trillium (1993), by Andre Norton
- Lady of the Trillium (1995), by Marion Zimmer Bradley
- Sky Trillium (1997), by Julian May

=== Free Traders universe ===
- Dark Piper (1968) - Vere Collis and his companions are the only human survivors on the planet Beltane
- Dread Companion (1970) - Kilda is governess to a child with a magical companion on the planet Dylan

==== Dipple ====
Stories featuring people displaced by interstellar war trying to escape their status as "dipples".

- Catseye (1961)
- Night of Masks (1964)

==== Forerunner ====
Featuring the Forerunners, a powerful vanished alien race whose artifacts survive them.

- Storm Over Warlock (1960)
- Ordeal in Otherwhere (1964)
- Ice Crown (1970)
- Forerunner Foray (1973)
- Forerunner (1981) – the first book published by Tom Doherty Associates under the Tor Books imprint
- Forerunner: The Second Venture (1985)

==== Janus ====
The story of Naill Renfro who, changed by an alien artifact, sets out to protect the planet of Janus from external threats.

- Judgment on Janus (1963; also issued as Judgement on Janus)
- Victory on Janus (1966)

==== Moon Magic or Moon Singer ====
A series following free trader Krip Vorlund, psychic sorceress Lady Maelen, and their telepathic companions.

- Moon of Three Rings (1966)
- Exiles of the Stars (1971)
- Flight in Yiktor (1986)
- Dare to Go A-Hunting (1989)

==== Solar Queen ====
A series following the Free Traders on the Solar Queen starship under captain Jellico exploring and making contact with new worlds.

- Sargasso of Space (1955, as by Andrew North; reissued 1957 as an Ace Double with The Cosmic Puppets by Philip K. Dick)
- Plague Ship (1956, as by Andrew North; reissued 1959 as an Ace Double with Voodoo Planet) – complete text via Project Gutenberg
- Voodoo Planet (1959, as by Andrew North; issued only as an Ace Double, first with Plague Ship and in 1968 with Star Hunter) – complete text via Project Gutenberg
- Postmarked the Stars (1969)
- Redline the Stars (1993), with P. M. Griffin
- Derelict for Trade (1997), with Sherwood Smith
- A Mind for Trade (1997), with Sherwood Smith

==== Zero Stone (Murdoc Jern) ====
A series following Murdoc Jern, son of a murdered interstellar gem trader, who discovers that the ring his father left him contains one of the powerful Zero Stones.

- The Zero Stone (1968)
- Uncharted Stars (1969)

=== Witch World ===
==== Estcarp Cycle ====
- Witch World (1963)
- Web of the Witch World (1964)
- Three Against the Witch World (1965)
- Warlock of the Witch World (1967)
- Sorceress of the Witch World (1968)
- Trey of Swords (1977)
- Ware Hawk (1983)
- The Gate of the Cat (1987)
- Ciara's Song (1998), with Lyn McConchie
- The Duke's Ballad (2005), with Lyn McConchie

==== High Hallack Cycle ====
- Year of the Unicorn (1965)
- The Crystal Gryphon (1972) – first book of the Gryphon trilogy
- Spell of the Witch World (1972), collection
- The Jargoon Pard (1974) - sequel to Year of the Unicorn
- Zarsthor's Bane (1978)
- Lore of the Witch World (1980), collection
- Gryphon in Glory (1981) – second book of the Gryphon trilogy
- Horn Crown (1981)
- Gryphon's Eyrie (1984), with A. C. Crispin – third book of the Gryphon trilogy
- Were-Wrath (Cheap Street, 1984), chapterbook, illus. Judy King-Rieniets – limited edition of 177 copies, very rare
- Wizards' Worlds (1989), collection - contains all of the stories from the previous collection Lore of the Witch World except "Legacy from Sorn Fen", as well as additional stories including "Were-Wrath"
- Songsmith (1992), with A. C. Crispin
- Silver May Tarnish (2005), with Lyn McConchie

==== The Turning ====
- Storms of Victory (omnibus) (1991) contains Port of Dead Ships by Andre Norton & Seakeep by P. M. Griffin
- Flight of Vengeance (omnibus) (1992) contains Exile by Mary H. Schaub & Falcon Hope by P. M. Griffin
- On Wings of Magic (omnibus) (1994) contains We the Women by Patricia Matthews & Falcon Magic by Sasha Miller

===== Secrets of the Witch World =====
(also part of The Turning)

- The Key of the Keplian (1995) with Lyn McConchie
- The Magestone (1996) with Mary H. Schaub
- The Warding of Witch World (1996)

==== Witch World anthologies edited ====
- Tales of the Witch World 1 (1987) – Norton wrote the introduction and Of the Shaping of Ulm's Heir
- Four from the Witch World (1989) – Norton wrote the introduction
- Tales of the Witch World 2 (1988) – Norton wrote the introduction
- Tales of the Witch World 3 (1990) – Norton wrote the introduction

== Omnibus editions ==
- The Beast Master / Star Hunter (1961, an Ace Double)
- Eye of the Monster / Sea Siege (1962, an Ace Double)
- Star Hunter / Voodoo Planet (1968, an Ace Double)
- Star Hunter and Voodoo Planet (1980, contains both Star Hunter and Voodoo Planet but is not an Ace Double)
- Sword Series Trilogy (1984 boxed set containing The Sword is Drawn, Sword in Sheath and At Swords' Point)
- Witch World: Swords and Spells (omnibus) (SFBC) (1987) contains Trey of Swords, Ware Hawk & The Gate of the Cat
- The Magic Books (1988 omnibus of Fur Magic, Steel Magic and Octagon Magic)
- Annals of the Witch World (omnibus) (SFBC) (1994) also published as The Gates to Witch World contains Witch World, Web of Witch World & Year of the Unicorn
- Chronicles of the Witch World (omnibus) (SFBC) (1998) also published as Lost Lands of Witch World contains Three Against the Witch World, Warlock of the Witch World & Sorceress of the Witch World
- Time Traders (2000 omnibus of The Time Traders and Galactic Derelict)
- Time Traders II (2001 omnibus of The Defiant Agents and Key Out of Time)
- The Gates to Witch World (omnibus) (TOR) (2001) also published as Annals of the Witch World contains Witch World, Web of Witch World & Year of the Unicorn
- Secrets of the Witch World (omnibus) (2001) contains Key of the Keplain, The Magestone & The Warding of Witch World – released as Digital Media Only
- Star Soldiers (2001 omnibus of Star Guard and Star Rangers)
- Time Traders III (2002 omnibus of Echoes in Time and Atlantis Endgame)
- Warlock (2002 omnibus of Storm Over Warlock, Ordeal in Otherwhere and Forerunner Foray)
- Janus (2002 omnibus of Judgment on Janus and Victory on Janus)
- Darkness and Dawn (2003 omnibus of Daybreak – 2250 AD & No Night Without Stars)
- Solar Queen (2003 omnibus of Sargasso of Space and Plague Ship)
- Lost Lands of Witch World (omnibus) (TOR) (2004) also published as Chronicles of the Witch World contains Three Against the Witch World, Warlock of the Witch World & Sorceress of the Witch World
- Gods and Androids (2004 omnibus of Android at Arms and Wraiths of Time)
- Beast Master Team (2004, omnibus of Beast Master's Ark and Beast Master's Circus)
- Beast Master's Planet (2005, omnibus of Beast Master and Lord of Thunder)
- Masks of the Outcasts (2005 omnibus of Catseye and Night of Masks)
- Dark Companion (2005 omnibus of Dark Piper and Dread Companion)
- Moonsinger (2006 omnibus of Moon of Three Rings and Exiles of the Stars)
- Quag Keep & Return to Quag Keep (2006 omnibus of Quag Keep and Return to Quag Keep)
- From the Sea To the Stars (2007 omnibus of Sea Siege and Star Gate)
- Star Flight (2007 omnibus edition of The Stars are Ours! and Star Born)
- Crosstime (2008 omnibus of The Crossroads of Time and Quest Crosstime)
- Search for the Star Stones (2008 omnibus of The Zero Stone and Uncharted Stars)
- The Game of Stars and Comets (2009 omnibus of The Sioux Spaceman, The Eye of the Monster, The X Factor and Voorloper)
- Deadly Dreams (2011 omnibus of Perilous Dreams and Knave of Dreams)
- Moonsinger's Quest (2011 omnibus of Flight in Yiktor and Dare to Go A-Hunting)
- Ice and Shadow (2012 omnibus of Ice Crown and Brother to Shadows)
- The Forerunner Factor (2012 omnibus of Forerunner & Forerunner: The Second Venture)
- The Iron Breed (2013 omnibus of Iron Cage and Breed to Come)
- Children of the Gates (2013 omnibus of Here Abide Monsters and Yurth Burden)
- Secret of the Stars (2014 omnibus of Secret of the Lost Race and Star Hunter)
- Tales from High Hallack (2014 short story omnibus in three volumes)

== Short stories ==
Some short stories appear in multiple books but only one book publication is listed for each.

- "Black Irish" (1939), Boys' Life
- "Freedom" (1943), poem, Cleveland Press, September

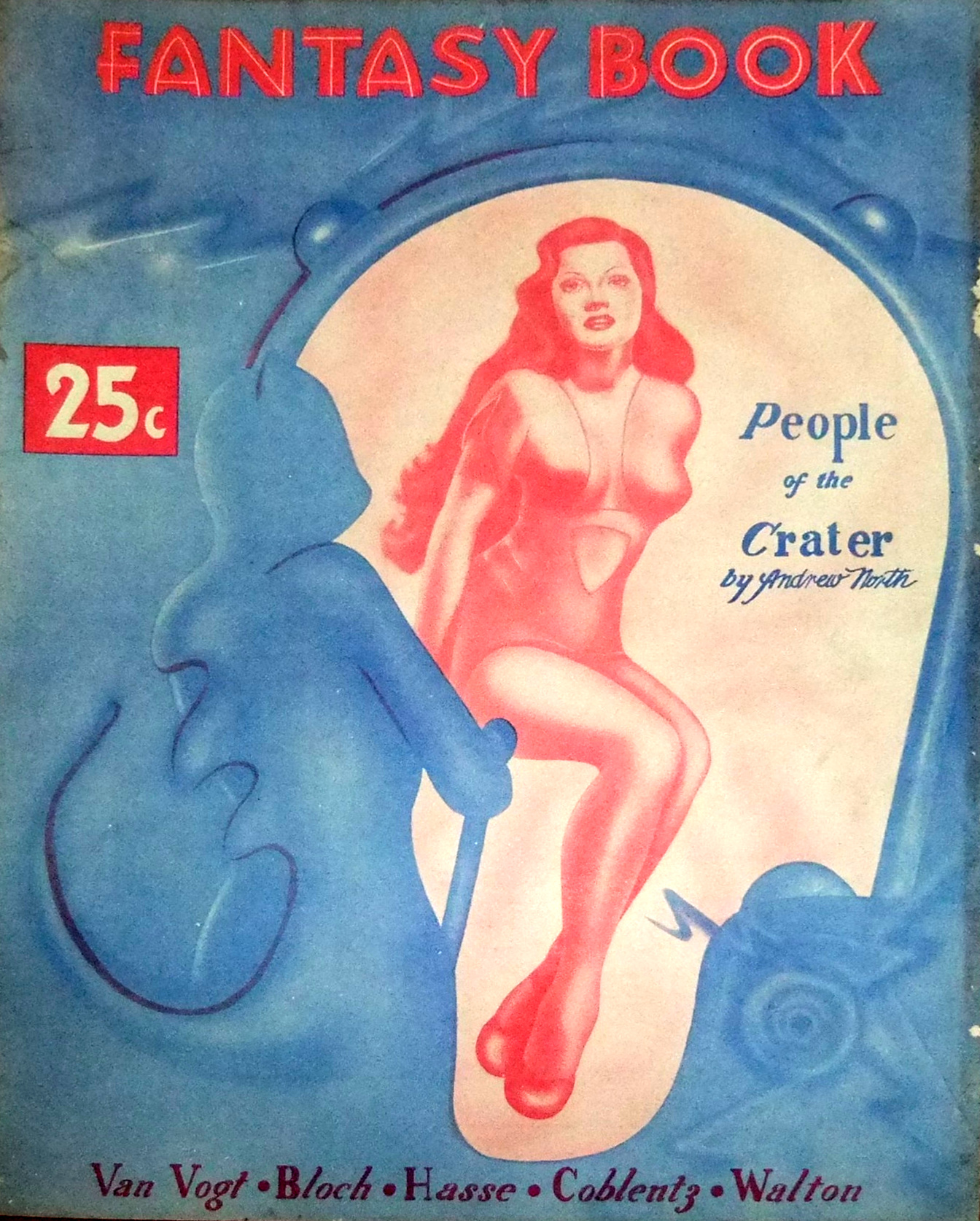
"The People of the Crater", published under Norton's "Andrew North" pseudonym, was the cover story in the debut issue of Fantasy Book in 1947

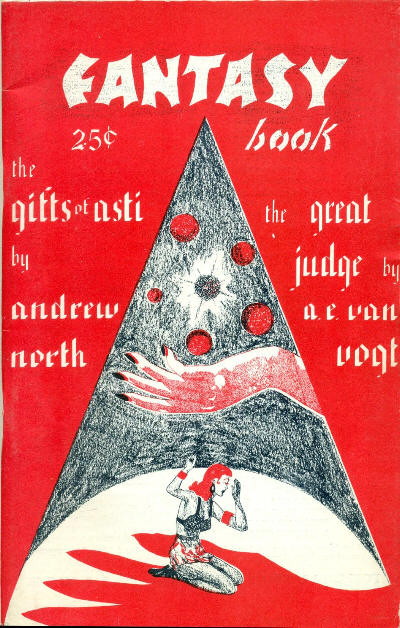
"The Gifts of Asti", also published under the "North" byline, took the cover of the third issue of Fantasy Book in 1948

- "People of the Crater" (1947), as by Andrew North, Fantasy Book, Vol. 1. No. 1; also issued as "Garin of Tav" (1972) – Garan the Eternal
- "The Gifts of Asti" (1948), as by Andrew North, Fantasy Book, Vol. 1, No. 3 – The Book of Andre Norton – complete text via Project Gutenberg
- "All Cats Are Gray" (1953), as by Andrew North, Fantastic Universe, Aug./Sep. 1953 – The Book of Andre Norton – complete text via Project Gutenberg
- "Mousetrap" (1954) – The Book of Andre Norton
- "By A Hair" (1958) – High Sorcery
- "The Boy and the Ogre" (1966) – Golden Magazine, September 1966
- "The Toymaker's Snuffbox" (1966) – Moon Mirror
- "Wizards' Worlds" (1967) – High Sorcery
- "Garan of Yu-Lac" (1969) – Garan the Eternal
- "Toys of Tamisan" (1969) – High Sorcery
- "Long Live Lord Kor!" (1970) – The Book of Andre Norton
- "Through the Needle's Eye" (1970) – High Sorcery
- "Ully the Piper" (1970) – High Sorcery
- "Ghost Tour" (1971) – Witchcraft and Sorcery, Vol. 1, No. 5, Feb. 1971
- "Amber out of Quayth" (1972) – Spell of Witch World
- "Artos, Son of Marius" (1972) – Dragon Magic
- "Dragon Scale Silver" (1972) – Spell of Witch World
- "Dream Smith" (1972) – Spell of Witch World
- "Legacy from Sorn Fen" (1972) – Garan the Eternal
- "One Spell Wizard" (1972) – Garan the Eternal
- "A Desirable Lakeside Residence" (1973) – Moon Mirror
- "London Bridge" (1973) – The Book of Andre Norton
- "Teddi" (1973) – Moon Mirror
- "The Toads of Grimmerdale" (1973) – The Book of Andre Norton
- "The Long Night of Waiting" (1974) – The Book of Andre Norton
- "Outside" (1974) – Moon Mirror
- "Cats" (1976), poem – Omniumgathum by Jonathan Bacon
- "The Last Cohort" (1976), poem – Omniumgathum
- "Song of the Barbarian Swordsman" (1976), poem – Omniumgathum by Jonathan Bacon
- "Get Out of My Dream!" (1976) – Perilous Dreams
- "Nightmare" (1976) – Perilous Dreams
- "Ship of Mist" (1976) – Perilous Dreams
- "Spider Silk" (1976) – Lore of the Witch World
- "Sword of Ice" (1977) – Trey of Swords
- "Sword of Lost Battles" (1977) – Trey of Swords
- "Sword of Shadow" (1977) – Trey of Swords
- "Sword of Unbelief" (1977) – Lore of the Witch World
- "Falcon Blood" (1979) – Lore of the Witch World
- "Sand Sister" (1979) – Lore of the Witch World
- "Changeling" (1980) – Lore of the Witch World
- "Moon Mirror" (1982) – Moon Mirror
- "Swamp Dweller" (1985) – Magic of Ithkar 1
- "Of the Shaping of Ulm's Heir" (1987) – Tales of the Witch World 1
- "Rider on a Mountain" (1987) – Friends of the Horseclans by Robert Adams
- "Serpent's Tooth" (1987 limited ed. chapterbook, above) – The SFWA Grand Masters, Vol. 2 by Frederik Pohl
- "The Dowry of the Rag Picker's Daughter" (1988) – Arabesques by Susan Shwartz
- "How Many Miles to Babylon?" (1988) – Moon Mirror
- "Noble Warrior" (1989) – Catfantastic
- "Hob's Pot" (1991) – Catfantastic II
- "The Silent One" (1991) – Chilled to the Bone by Robert T. Garcia
- "The Chronicler: `There was a time ...`" (1991) – Storms of Victory
- "The Chronicler: `Once I was Duratan ...`" (1992) – Flight of Vengeance
- "The Nabob's Gift" (1992) – All Hallows Eve: Tales of Love and the Supernatural by Mary Elizabeth Allen
- "Nine Threads of Gold" (1992) – After the King by Martin H. Greenberg
- "That Which Overfloweth" (1992) – Grails; Quest of the Dawn by Richard Gillium
- "A Very Dickensy Christmas" (1992) – The Magic of Christmas by John Silbersack
- "The Chronicler: `There are places `" (1994) – On Wings of Magic
- "Noble Warrior Meets with a Ghost" (1994) – Catfantastic III
- "The Last Spell" (1995) – Ancient Enchantresses by Kathleen M. Massie-Ferch
- "The Way Wind" (1995) – Sisters in Fantasy, Vol. 1 by Susan Shwartz and Martin H. Greenberg
- "Auour the Deepminded" (1996) – Warrior Enchantresses by Kathleen M. Massie-Ferch
- "No Folded Hands" (1996) – The Williamson Effect by Roger Zelazny
- "Noble Warrior; Teller of Fortunes" (1996) – Catfantastic IV
- "Bard's Crown" (1997) – Elf Fantastic by Martin H. Greenberg
- "Frog Magic" (1997) – Wizard Fantastic by Martin H. Greenberg
- "Herne's Lady" (1998) – Lamps on the Brow by James Cahill
- "The Outling" (1998) – Lord of the Fantastic: Fantastic Stories in Honor of Roger Zelazny by Martin H. Greenberg
- "The Stonish Men" (1998) – On Crusade: More Tales of the Knights Templar by Katherine Kurtz
- "Churchyard Yew" (1999) – Dangerous Magic by Denise Little
- "Noble Warrior and the `Gentleman`" (1999) – Catfantastic V
- "Root and Branch Shall Change" (1999) – Merlin by Martin H. Greenberg
- "White Violets" (1999) – Marion Zimmer Bradley's Fantasy Magazine, Autumn 1999
- "Needle and Dream" (2000) – Perchance to Dream by Denise Little
- "Procession to Var" (2000) – Guardsmen of Tomorrow by Martin H. Greenberg
- "Set in Stone" (2000) – Far Frontiers by Martin H. Greenberg
- "Ravenmere" (2001) – Historical Hauntings by Jean Rabe
- "Three-Inch Trouble" (2001) – A Constellation of Cats by Denise Little
- "The End is the Beginning" (2002) – Oceans of Space by Brian Thomsen
- "The Familiar" (2002) – Familiars by Denise Little
- "Red Cross, White Cross" (2002) – Knight Fantastic by Martin H. Greenberg
- "Sow's Ear – Silk Purse" (2002) – 30th Anniversary DAW: Fantasy by Elizabeth R. Wollheim
- "Earthborne" (2004) – Masters of Fantasy by Bill Fawcett and Brian Thomsen
- "The Cobwebbed Princess" (2005) – Magic Tails by Martin H. Greenberg and Janet Pack
- "Faire Likeness" (2005) – Renaissance Faire

== Anthologies edited ==
This section does not include four Witch World anthologies.

- Bullard of the Space Patrol (Cleveland: World Publishing Company, 1951), collection of stories by Malcolm Jameson, edited with an introduction by Norton
- Space Service (World, 1953), ed. with introduction by Norton
- Space Pioneers (World, 1954), ed. with preface by Norton
- Space Police (World, 1956), ed. with foreword by Norton
- Gates to Tomorrow: An Introduction to Science Fiction (1973), ed. with Ernestine Donaldy
- Small Shadows Creep (1974)
- Baleful Beasts and Eerie Creatures (1976), ed. with Rod Ruth, introduction by Norton
- Grand Masters' Choice (1989), ed. with Ingrid Zierhut and Robert Bloch, includes "The Toads Of Grimmerdale" by Norton
- Renaissance Faire (2005), ed. with Jean Rabe, introduction and "Faire Likeness" by Norton

=== Catfantastic ===
Five anthologies edited by Norton and Martin H. Greenberg, published by DAW books.

- Catfantastic: Nine Lives and Fifteen Tales (1989), introduction and "Noble Warrior" by Norton
- Catfantastic II (1991; also issued as Fantastic Cat), introduction by Norton and Greenberg, "Hob's Pot" by Norton
- Catfantastic III (1994), introduction and "Noble Warrior Meets with a Ghost" by Norton
- Catfantastic IV (1996), introduction and "Noble Warrior, Teller of Fortunes" by Norton
- Catfantastic V (1999), introduction and "Noble Warrior and the "Gentleman"" by Norton

=== Magic in Ithkar ===
Four anthologies edited by Norton and Robert Adams, published by Tor Books. Adams is credited with the four Prologues and the Biographical Notes for volume 4, Norton with the Biographical Notes for volume 1 (vols. 2 and 3 not credited).

- Magic in Ithkar (1985), includes "Swamp Dweller" by Norton
- Magic in Ithkar 2 (1985)
- Magic in Ithkar 3 (1986)
- Magic in Ithkar 4 (1987)

== Works by Andre Norton published exclusively at Andre-Norton.com ==
- The Cat Who Used His Wits - (ss)
- Explorer IV - (ss)
- The Fat Troll - (ss)
- Fanus - (ss)
- The Hobyahs - (ss)
- The Legend of the Fairy Stone - (ss)
- The Knights of the Fish - (ss)
- Place by the Window - (ss)
- Ring of Stone - (ss)
- Rusted Armor - (ss)
- Rusted Armor - (novel co-authored with Caroline Fike)
- The Scribbling Women - (text book for universities covering female Victorian authors)
- Strong Medicine - (ss)
- The Telling of Tales - (collection of 13 previously unpublished short stories.
- Trouble in Mayapan - (fourth novel in the Lorens Van Norreys series)
- Ully the Piper (draft) - (ss)
- Water Wizard - (ss)
- Who Dreams of Dragons? - (ss) Dedicated to Anne McCaffrey
- Yankee Camels - (ss)

== Non-fiction ==
Journal articles

- Norton, Andre (Summer 1985). "Feminist Pied Piper in SF". Children's Literature Association Quarterly. 10 (2): 66–70. doi:10.1353/chq.0.0179. S2CID 143650199.
