= Wizards' Worlds =

Book by Andre Norton

- First edition cover
- Author: Andre Norton
- Cover artist: Lucy Synk
- Language: English
- Genre: Science fantasy
- Publisher: Tor Books
- Publication date: 1989
- Publication place: United States
- Media type: Print (hardcover)
- Pages: 500
- ISBN: 0-312-93191-3

Wizards' Worlds is a collection of science fantasy short stories by American writer Andre Norton. It was first published in hardcover by Tor Books in September 1989, with a limited edition, also in hardcover, following in December of the same year from Easton Press as part of its "Signed First Editions of Science Fiction" series. The book was reprinted in paperback by Tor in July 1990.

== Summary ==
The book collects thirteen novellas, novelettes and short stories by Norton, most of them previously published in her collections High Sorcery (1970) and Lore of the Witch World (1980). The title story was previously published as "Wizards' World". Included are seven stories set in Norton's "Witch World" series ("Falcon Blood", "The Toads of Grimmerdale", "Changeling", "Spider Silk", "Sword of Unbelief", "Sand Sister", and "Were-Wrath".

== Contents ==
- "Falcon Blood" (from Amazons!, edited by Jessica Amanda Salmonson, 1979)
- "The Toads of Grimmerdale" (from Flashing Swords! #2, edited by Lin Carter, 1974)
- "Changeling" (from Lore of the Witch World, by Andre Norton, 1980)
- "Spider Silk" (from Flashing Swords! #3, edited by Lin Carter, 1976)
- "Sword of Unbelief" (from Swords Against Darkness II, edited by Andrew J. Offutt, 1977)
- "Sand Sister" (from Heroic Fantasy, edited by Gerald W. Page and Hank Reinhardt, 1979)
- "Toys of Tamisan" (from If, v. 19, nos. 4–5, April–May 1969)
- "Wizards' Worlds" (from If, v, 17, no. 6, June 1967 (as "Wizards' World")
- "Mousetrap" (from The Magazine of Fantasy and Science Fiction, v. 6, no. 6, June 1954)
- "Were-Wrath" (from a hand-printed 1984 limited edition)
- "By a Hair" (from Phantom Magazine, July 1958)
- "All Cats Are Gray" (from Fantastic Universe, v. 1, no. 2, August–September 1953)
- "Swamp Dweller" (from Magic in Ithkar, edited by Andre Norton and Robert Adams, 1985)
