= Sargasso of Space =

1955 novel by Andre Norton

- Cover of the edition
- Author: Andrew North
- Cover artist: Ed Emshwiller
- Language: English
- Series: Solar Queen
- Genre: Science fiction
- Publisher: Gnome Press
- Publication date: 1955
- Publication place: United States
- Media type: Print (Hardcover)
- Pages: 185
- OCLC: 6536915
- Followed by: Plague Ship

"The Sargasso of Space" is also the title of a 1931 sf novelette by Edmond Hamilton

Sargasso of Space is a science fiction novel by American writer Andre Norton, written under the alternate pseudonym "Andrew North". It was published in 1955 by Gnome Press in an edition of 4,000 copies.

== Sequels ==
- Plague Ship (1956)
- Voodoo Planet (1959)
- Postmarked the Stars (1969)
- Redline the Stars (1993), with P. M. Griffin
- Derelict for Trade (1997), with Sherwood Smith
- A Mind for Trade (1997), with Sherwood Smith

== Plot ==
Fresh out of Training Pool, a trade school for spaceship crews, Dane Thorson discovers that his first assignment as apprentice-Cargo Master puts him on Solar Queen, a Free Trader: basically an interstellar tramp freighter. At the end of Dane’s first flight, the ship’s captain gains an opportunity to bid on a planet newly opened for possible trade and the crew goes all in to get the contract for a planet named Limbo. The information on the planet, which comes with the contract, does not look promising, but things look up a bit when a team of archaeologists hires Solar Queen to take them to Limbo.

On Limbo the archaeologists set up camp in the ruins of a Forerunner town, a trace of the people who ran a galactic empire long before humans ventured into space and who had wiped themselves out in an interstellar war. Dane and four others go exploring, to try to find intelligent life and potential trade goods. One of the group, Ali Kamil, disappears, apparently kidnapped by people using alien technology.

Spooked, a group including Dane goes to the ruins to check up on the archaeologists and finds that they have disappeared. Suspicion makes them return to Solar Queen by an alternate route and they begin to find wrecked spaceships, some from thousands of years previous, that show signs of having been looted. Approaching their landing site, they find Solar Queen under siege by pirates and they discern that the archaeologists are part of the pirate gang.

While watching their ship from cover, Dane and his companions capture a pirate and invade the pirates’ underground base. There they find Forerunner technology still operating. In particular, they see two of the pirates operating a machine that draws in spaceships and crashes them on the planet. They also see signals indicating that one of the pirates’ own ships is being pursued by a Stellar Patrol cruiser.

Dane and his companions shut down the Forerunner base as the Patrol ship approaches and then try to fight their way out of the base. As the Solar Queen's crew engages the pirates in a blaster battle, the Patrol comes in and rescues them, putting a complete end to the pirates’ operation.

The Patrol insists that Solar Queen's crew give up their contract for Limbo, due to Forerunner artifacts, but they are allowed to take over the contract of one of the pirates’ victims, for trade with a planet called Sargol.

== Reception ==
Galaxy reviewer Floyd C. Gale praised the novel as "unpretentious space opera. . . . good adventure reading for a couple of carefree hours." Anthony Boucher was less impressed, finding Sargasso "a competent routine space opera obviously aimed at the audience whose concept of s.f. is derived from T.V. serials."

== Sources ==
- Chalker, Jack L.; Mark Owings (1998). The Science-Fantasy Publishers: A Bibliographic History, 1923-1998. Westminster, MD and Baltimore: Mirage Press, Ltd. p. 304.
- Tuck, Donald H. (1978). The Encyclopedia of Science Fiction and Fantasy. Chicago: Advent. p. 331. ISBN 0-911682-22-8.
