= Lore of the Witch World =

Book by Andre Norton

- Cover of the first edition
- Author: Andre Norton
- Cover artist: Michael Whelan
- Language: English
- Series: Witch World
- Genre: Science fantasy
- Publisher: DAW Books
- Publication date: 1980
- Publication place: United States
- Media type: Print (paperback)
- Pages: 223
- ISBN: 0-87997-560-1
- OCLC: 6738437
- Preceded by: Spell of the Witch World

Lore of the Witch World is a collection of science fantasy short stories by American writer Andre Norton, forming part of her Witch World series. It was first published in paperback by DAW Books in September 1980, and has been reprinted numerous times since. Early printings had cover art by Michael Whelan and a frontispiece by Jack Gaughan.

== Summary ==
The book collects seven "Witch World" pieces by Norton: two short stories, three novelettes, and two novellas, most of which had been previously published elsewhere, together with an introduction by C. J. Cherryh.

== Contents ==
- "Introduction" (C. J. Cherryh)
- "Spider Silk" (from Flashing Swords! #3, edited by Lin Carter, 1976)
- "Sand Sister" (from Heroic Fantasy, edited by Gerald W. Page and Hank Reinhardt, 1979)
- "Falcon Blood" (from Amazons!, edited by Jessica Amanda Salmonson, 1979)
- "Legacy from Sorn Fen" (from Norton's earlier collection Garan the Eternal, 1973)
- "Sword of Unbelief" (from Swords Against Darkness II, edited by Andrew J. Offutt, 1977)
- "The Toads of Grimmerdale" (from Flashing Swords! #2, edited by Lin Carter, 1974)
- "Changeling" (written for this collection)
