= GURPS Witch World =

Tabletop role-playing game

- GURPS Witch World cover
- Designers: Sasha Miller and Ben W. Miller
- Publishers: Steve Jackson Games
- Publication: 1989
- Genres: Fantasy
- Systems: GURPS 3rd Edition
- Based on the Witch World novels by Andre Norton

GURPS Witch World is a supplement published by Steve Jackson Games in 1989 for use with the GURPS (Generic Universal Role-Playing System) game rules that describes how to set a role-playing campaign in Andre Norton's Witch World.

== Contents ==
GURPS Witch World is a GURPS supplement and campaign setting describing play in Andre Norton's fantastic Witch World. The book includes a history of the world, a guide and maps to its various lands, character creation rules, Witch World magic and psionics, magic items, and creatures. It covers both the western and eastern continents where the book stories had taken place.

The book is divided into eight chapters and an appendix, covering the history, geography, the creation of GURPS characters, and the system of color-based magic used in those lands. It also gives a description of various magic items; psionic abilities; the use and properties of herbs, and a bestiary of Witch World creatures, most of which were mentioned in Andre Norton's books. The appendix gives details of the main characters from the books, and a bibliography of the Witch World novels.

The Witch World setting includes several different non-human races which were detailed in the novels. These are fully detailed in the book, as well as several NPC races that are not suitable for player characters. The various human cultures and peoples are also detailed, along with their general characteristics and skills. An example of the non-human races is the Old Race, a telepathically gifted people with strong wills who did not grow old until they reached 400 years of age.

The magic system of Witch World divides the spells into colors, rather than using the system of colleges as in the standard GURPS Magic system. The cultural bias of this world setting only allows females to receive magic instructions. Males can also possess magical aptitude, but they find it difficult to receive instruction in the arts. Characters can be trained in spells from multiple different colors of magic.

The colors correspond to the GURPS Magic spells as follows:

- Red — Healing, restoring strength, war, and fire.
- Orange — Move, break, and repair objects; teleport, time travel, and gate between worlds.
- Yellow — Illusion, telepathy, and thought control.
- Green — Earth and nature.
- Blue — Emotions and foretelling.
- Indigo — Air and water.
- Purple — Control and enslave the minds of others.
- Violet — Summon spirits, demons, and other beings; detect, control, and resist spells.
- Brown — Beasts and animals.

The force of evil in this setting is known as the Shadow, and various unsavory creatures are allied with this aspect. These are detailed in the bestiary, along with unique animals and plants found on the Witch World.

The only other book required to use this supplement is the GURPS Basic Set (3rd edition), although GURPS Magic is recommended.

== Publication history ==
GURPS Witch World: Roleplaying in Andre Norton's Witch World was written by Sasha Miller and Ben W. Miller, and was published by Steve Jackson Games in 1989 as a 128-page book. The book features a color-illustrated stiff paper jacket and black-and-white interior illustrations.

In his 2011 book Designers & Dragons, games historian Shannon Appelcline noted that GURPS Witch World was one of the earliest licensed properties produced by Steve Jackson Games.

== Reception ==
In the June 1989 edition of Games International (Issue 6), James Wallis thought that the book had done a good job of interpreting the Witch World series, commenting, "authority and knowledgebility are apparent throughout." He concluded by giving this book an above-average rating of 4 out of 5, saying, "Fans of Witch World should certainly buy this book. Avid devourers of fantasy fiction would probably also find it appealing."
