= Spell of the Witch World =

Book by Andre Norton

- Cover of the first edition
- Author: Andre Norton
- Cover artist: Jack Gaughan
- Language: English
- Series: Witch World
- Genre: Science fantasy
- Publisher: DAW Books
- Publication date: 1972
- Publication place: United States
- Media type: Print (paperback)
- Pages: 159
- ISBN: 978-0-88677-242-0
- Followed by: Lore of the Witch World

Spell of the Witch World is a collection of science fantasy short fiction by American writer Andre Norton, forming part of her Witch World series. It was first published in paperback by DAW Books in April 1972, and has been reprinted numerous times since. It has the distinction of being the first book released by that publisher. Early printings had cover art and a frontispiece by artist Jack Gaughan; later printings replaced the cover art (but not the frontispiece) with new art by Michael Whelan. The first hardcover edition was a photographic reprint of the DAW edition published by Gregg Press in 1977. It featured a new frontispiece by Alice D. Phalen and endpaper maps of the Witch World by Barbi Johnson.

== Summary ==
The book collects three "Witch World" pieces by Norton, two novellas and one short story, all original to the collection.

== Contents ==
- "Dragon Scale Silver"
- "Dream Smith"
- "Amber out of Quayth"
