= Horn Crown =

- Cover of the 1981 Daw Books edition
- Author: Andre Norton
- Language: English
- Publisher: Daw
- Publication date: 1981

Horn Crown is a 1981 novel written by Andre Norton.

== Plot summary ==
Horn Crown is a novel in which a prequel to the Witch World series traces the origins of humanity's arrival in the mystical realm after the departure of the Elder People. Set during the early days of human settlement, the novel explores the lingering presence of ancient powers—shrines of light and darkness, magical traps, and ominous guardians—that shape the landscape and the fate of its new inhabitants. The story centers on two contrasting figures: Elron the Clanless, a principled warrior seeking redemption by rescuing his ex-lord's missing daughter, and Gathea the Wise Woman, whose pursuit of the same girl is driven by ambition and a desire for power. Their paths intertwine and diverge throughout the narrative, revealing their distinct motivations and personalities. Written from Elron's perspective, the novel offers a view of the quest while hinting at Gathea's parallel journey.

== Reception ==
C. J. Henderson reviewed Horn Crown for Pegasus magazine and stated that "Horn Crown is good reading. For anyone who has ever read a Witch World novel, this one is an absolute must. For anyone who has never read one, I couldn't recommend a better one to start with."

== Reviews ==
- Review by Kendra Usack (1982) in Science Fiction Review, Winter 1982
