= Nameless Places =

- Dust-jacket illustration by Tim Kirk for the original edition.
- Editor: Gerald W. Page
- Cover artist: Tim Kirk
- Language: English
- Genre: Fantasy, horror, science fiction
- Publisher: Arkham House
- Publication date: 1975
- Publication place: United States
- Media type: Print (hardback)
- Pages: viii, 279
- ISBN: 0-87054-073-4
- OCLC: 1940187
- Dewey Decimal: 823/.9/1408
- LC Class: PZ1 .N2 PS648.F3

Nameless Places is an anthology of science fiction, fantasy and horror stories edited by Gerald W. Page. It was released in 1975 by Arkham House in an edition of 4,160 copies. The stories in this volume had not been previously published.

== Contents ==
- "Foreword", by Gerald W. Page
- "Glimpses", by A.A. Attanasio
- "The Night of the Unicorn", by Thomas Burnett Swann
- "The Warlord of Kul Satu", by Brian Ball
- "More Things", by G.N. Gabbard
- "The Real Road to the Church", by Robert Aickman
- "The Gods of Earth", by Gary Myers
- "Walls of Yellow Clay", by Robert E. Gilbert
- "Businessman's Lament", by Scott Edelstein
- "Dark Vintage", by Joseph F. Pumilia
- "Simaitha", by David A. English
- "In the Land of Angra Mainyu", by Stephen Goldin
- "Worldsong", by Gerald W. Page
- "What Dark God?", by Brian Lumley
- "The Stuff of Heroes", by Bob Maurus
- "Forringer's Fortune", by Joseph Payne Brennan
- "Before the Event", by Denys Val Baker
- "In 'Ygiroth", by Walter C. DeBill, Jr.
- "The Last Hand", by Ramsey Campbell
- "Out of the Ages", by Lin Carter
- "Chameleon Town", by Carl Jacobi
- "Botch", by Scott Edelstein
- "Black Iron", by David Drake
- "Selene", by E. Hoffmann Price
- "The Christmas Present", by Ramsey Campbell
- "Lifeguard", by Arthur Byron Cover
- "Biographical Data" by Cyrus Hadavi

== Sources ==
- Jaffery, Sheldon (1989). The Arkham House Companion. Mercer Island, WA: Starmont House, Inc. pp. 110–111. ISBN 1-55742-005-X.
- Chalker, Jack L.; Mark Owings (1998). The Science-Fantasy Publishers: A Bibliographic History, 1923-1998. Westminster, MD and Baltimore: Mirage Press, Ltd. p. 51.
- Joshi, S.T. (1999). Sixty Years of Arkham House: A History and Bibliography. Sauk City, WI: Arkham House. p. 134. ISBN 0-87054-176-5.
- Nielsen, Leon (2004). Arkham House Books: A Collector's Guide. Jefferson, NC and London: McFarland & Company, Inc. pp. 119–120. ISBN 0-7864-1785-4.
