= Flashing Swords! 3: Warriors and Wizards =

1976 anthology edited by Lin Carter

Flashing Swords! #3: Warriors and Wizards
- Cover art from the first paperback edition.
- Editor: Lin Carter
- Cover artist: Don Maitz
- Language: English
- Series: Flashing Swords!
- Genre: Fantasy
- Publisher: Dell Books
- Publication date: 1976
- Publication place: United States
- Media type: Print (paperback)
- Preceded by: Flashing Swords! #2
- Followed by: Flashing Swords! #4: Barbarians and Black Magicians

Flashing Swords! #3: Warriors and Wizards is an anthology of fantasy stories, edited by American writer Lin Carter. The first two volumes of this series had been published in hardcover by Doubleday. However, Volume #3 was published only in paperback(Dell Books, August 1976). The first German edition was issued by Pabel in November 1978.

== Summary ==
The book collects five heroic fantasy novelettes by members of the Swordsmen and Sorcerers' Guild of America (SAGA), an informal literary group of fantasy authors active from the 1960s to the 1980s, of which Carter was also a member and guiding force, together with a general introduction and introductions to the individual stories by the editor.

== Contents ==
- "Introduction: Warriors and Wizards" by Lin Carter
- "Two Yards of Dragon" (Eudoric Dambertson) by L. Sprague de Camp
- "The Frost Monstreme" (Fafhrd and the Gray Mouser) by Fritz Leiber
- "Spider Silk" (Witch World) by Andre Norton
- "The Curious Custom of the Turjan Seraad" (Amalric the Mangod) by Lin Carter
- "Caravan to Illiel" by Avram Davidson

== Awards ==
The book was nominated for the 1977 World Fantasy Award for Best Anthology/Collection.

== Reception ==
The anthology was reviewed by J. P. Manteel and Byron Roarke in The Howard Review (second edition) no. 3, August 1998, and in The Howard Review no. 3.5, December 1990, by Alan Winston in Delap's F & SF Review, January 1977, Carter himself in The Year's Best Fantasy Stories: 3, Michael Nagula in SF Perry Rhodan Magazin, 2/79, and Helmut W. Pesch in Magira no. 32, 1979.
