= The Defiant Agents =

1962 novel by Andre Norton

- Cover of the first edition
- Author: Andre Norton
- Cover artist: Ed Emshwiller
- Language: English
- Series: The Time Traders
- Genre: Science fiction
- Publisher: World Publishing Company
- Publication date: 1962
- Publication place: United States
- Media type: Print (Hardcover, paperback, and electronic)
- Pages: 224
- Preceded by: Galactic Derelict
- Followed by: Key Out of Time

The Defiant Agents is a science fiction novel by American writer Andre Norton, the third book in her Time Traders series. It was first published in 1962, and as of 2012, had been reprinted in ten editions with cover changes, as well as twice in a combined edition with Key Out of Time. It is part of Norton's Forerunner universe.

The Defiant Agents continues the series’ premise, an encounter between Western heroes, and the Russian Communists, and a mysterious alien race that has used time travel to alter Earth. Most interaction in this novel is in an American Indian-like setting.

Kirkus Reviews comments, “Andre Norton, a polished writer of science fiction, weaves [her] outlandish fare in patterns intricate enough to attract the most devoted addict. Do not try to contrive a consistent political allegory out of [her] flight into fantasy. This is pure science fiction ...”

== Plot ==
The alien library discovered in the previous novel proved to have locations of many unknown worlds. Finding the secure location of planet Topaz compromised, Apache operatives, including Travis Fox, are sent on an emergency trip with a mind-altering machine, Redax, which activates their ancestral memories. Their ship crash lands. Travis discovers he has the ability to communicate with the coyotes, but none of the survivors have any idea why they are there.

They encounter Russians who have undergone similar treatment, and similarly lacking their memories, which have been replaced by those of ancestors from the Mongolian Golden Horde. Unlike the Apache, the Mongols are subject to governing mind-control. With their common experience, they join forces against the modern Russian mind-controllers. Memories gradually return. After finding alien technology too dangerous for the anybody to have, Travis seeks allies. They lay a successful trap for the Russian controllers. Defeating the source of Russian control, the allies agree to guard the alien technology from outsiders in the years to come.

== Novels in the series ==
- The Time Traders (1958)
- Galactic Derelict (1959)
- The Defiant Agents (1962)
- Key Out of Time (1963)
- Firehand (1994) (with Pauline M Griffin)
- Echoes in Time (1999) (with Sherwood Smith)
- Time Traders II (2001)
- Atlantis Endgame (2002) (with Sherwood Smith)
