= The Warding of Witch World =

- First edition cover
- Author: Andre Norton
- Language: English
- Publisher: Warner Books
- Publication date: 1996
- ISBN: 0-446-51991-X (first edition)
- Dewey Decimal: 813.52
- LC Class: PS3527.O632 W37

The Warding of Witch World is a 1996 novel written by Andre Norton.

== Themes ==
The Warding of Witch World is a novel in which magical phenomena and creatures from across genres are featured, and women are portrayed as capable, courageous, and inventive figures. The series includes symbolism associating "cold" and "dark" with evil and "light" and "white" with good.

== Reception ==
Jonathan Palmer reviewed The Warding of Witch World for Arcane magazine, rating it a 6 out of 10 overall, and stated that "it's all extremely understated and follows accepted, though fundamentally wrong, premises. In fact, it wouldn't surprise me one iota if it had never crossed Andre Norton's mind that what she was saying could actually be construed as racist. It certainly never crossed mine until I came to read her again 25 years later. Maybe, it's never crossed yours, either. It's just a shame, though, that Andre Norton, like almost everybody else you'll ever meet in this life, has forgotten that Jesus was a black man."

== Reviews ==
- Review by Shira Daemon (1996) in Locus, #427 August 1996
- Review by Mark L. Olson (1998) in Aboriginal Science Fiction, Summer 1998
