= Perilous Dreams =

Book by Andre Norton

- Cover of the first edition
- Author: Andre Norton
- Cover artist: George Barr
- Language: English
- Genre: Science fantasy
- Publisher: DAW Books
- Publication date: 1976
- Publication place: United States
- Media type: Print (paperback)
- Pages: 199

Perilous Dreams is a collection of science fantasy short stories by American writer Andre Norton. It was first published in paperback by DAW Books in June 1976, with a cover and frontispiece by George Barr; it was reprinted in September 1978, July 1982 and September 1987. Barr's art was replaced with new art by Kevin Eugene Johnson and then Ken W. Kelly on the covers of the reprints, though the original frontispiece was retained. The book has also been translated into Italian. It was later gathered together with the author's novel Knave of Dreams into the omnibus collection Deadly Dreams (Baen Books, June 2011).

The book collects four novelettes and novellas by Norton, one originally published in If, the other three apparently original to the collection.

== Contents ==
- "Toys of Tamisan" (from If, v. 19, nos. 4-5, April–May 1969)
- "Ship of Mist"
- "Get Out of My Dream"
- "Nightmare"
