= Quag Keep =

1978 fantasy novel by Andre Norton

- Cover of the 1st edition, 1978
- Author: Andre Norton
- Genre: Fantasy novel
- Set in: World of Greyhawk
- Published: 1978
- Publisher: Atheneum Books
- Media type: Hardcover
- Pages: 222
- ISBN: 9780689501074
- Followed by: Return to Quag Keep

Quag Keep is a fantasy novel by Andre Norton published in 1978. Written after Norton had participated in a session of Dungeons & Dragons with Gary Gygax, it was the first novel to be set in Gygax's World of Greyhawk, and the first to be based on the game of D&D.

== Plot summary ==
Martin, a player in a game of D&D, touches a figurine of a warrior, and is unwillingly transported into the body of Milo Jagon, a warrior in the city of Greyhawk. Milo/Martin gradually meets others likewise transported to this world. Bound together by forces they do not understand, the players struggle to trust each other. Under the compulsion of a geas, everyone is forced to go on a quest. They eventually confront the one controlling them, the Gamemaster, and battle with him to regain control of their lives. Although they win, they find that they cannot return to "reality", and must remain in Greyhawk. Rather than splitting up, they realize they make a good team and decide to continue their adventures together.

== Publication history ==
Gary Gygax co-invented the game of Dungeons & Dragons, and formed the company TSR in 1974 to publish the new game. Two years later, with sales of the game booming, Gygax invited the popular science fiction/fantasy author Andre Norton to play a session of D&D set within his own home campaign world of Greyhawk. Gygax later published details of this campaign world in the World of Greyhawk Fantasy Game Setting two years after their session.

Norton subsequently wrote Quag Keep using concepts from the role-playing game. The 222-page hardcover book was published by Atheneum Books in 1978. Just prior to the novel's release, it was excerpted in issue 12 of Dragon (February 1978). It was the first novel based on a role-playing game, the first to use the Greyhawk setting, and the first to be based on D&D.

In the early 2000s, Norton and Jean Rabe began to collaborate on a sequel to Quag Keep, but Norton died before the book was completed. Rabe subsequently finished Return to Quag Keep, which was published by Tor Books in 2006.

== Reception ==
Quag Keep was one of Norton's less successful novels, and adult audience reviews were generally dismissive.

Joyce Scrivner, writing for Graustark, found that "the concepts are much too strong for the book. The story is of course a quest. But there is not enough time spent on the characters' interactions or the story of the travel." Scrivner thought that much more could have been done with the plot, saying, "There is not enough of a story here. The book is entirely too short for the story/plot/characters." She concluded, "Interesting, but minor, this book could be a good first draft for a novel three times as long."

Chuck Schacht, writing for the School Library Journal, agreed that the book was not Norton's finest work, finding that the main characters "are insufficiently developed and in general too cold and competent to invite empathy." Scacht also found the ending of the book lacked a finale, saying, "Norton, with the deft touch of a master, puts them through their paces in exciting action scenes set in vividly evoked alien atmospheres — until she gets them to where they've been headed all along; but then she has a hard time explaining satisfactorily what it's all been about."

In the April 1980 issue of Analog, Tom Easton found the quality matched Norton's previous output, writing, "She has never produced anything that could be called great, but she has consistently been entertaining and readable. Her latest, Quag Keep, is no exception, for all that its framework and premise are curious ... The story's opening may seem to require a taste for literary incest, but one soon gets past that and into the parallel reality, returning to the game-frame only toward the end, when she seems to set the reader up for a sequel."

Due to its cast of young people, Quag Keep also received attention from educators, who generally thought it was a good book for teenage readers:

- The North Carolina Department of Public Instruction listed Quag Keep in its Advisory List of Fiction, commenting that "this fantasy by a popular science fiction writer will appeal to junior high school students who love quest books with battles between Law (good) and Chaos (evil)."
- Publishers Weekly called Quag Keep "an arresting novel about people confused in time and identities [...] Norton keeps readers nearly entranced as the actors are, in her expertly realized drama."
- Charlotte Draper, in The Horn Book Magazine, called the fantasy setting "cleverly devised and integrated." She concluded "The game seems deadly serious and involves a restructuring of the identity not only of the players — but ultimately of the gamemaster himself."
- H. Flick Jr., writing for Kliatt, called it "a typically exciting Norton fantasy tale."
