= Voodoo Planet =

1959 novel by Andre Norton

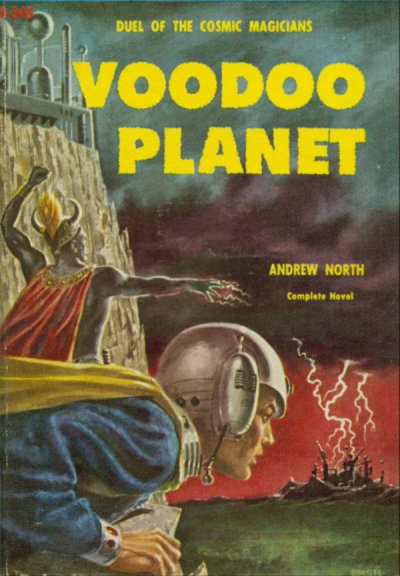
- Cover of Voodoo Planet in 1959.
- Author: Andre Norton
- Cover artist: Ed Valigursky
- Language: English
- Series: Solar Queen/Dane Thorson
- Genre: Science fiction
- Published: 1959 (Ace Books)
- Publication place: United States
- Media type: Print (Paperback)
- Pages: 78 (Paperback edition)
- OCLC: 654440303
- Preceded by: Plague Ship
- Followed by: Postmarked the Stars

Voodoo Planet is a science fiction novel by American writer Andre Norton, first published in 1959 by Ace Books. This is a short novel that was usually published in a double-novel format. It is part of the Solar Queen series of novels.

The story involves two witch doctors who conjure up ghosts and demons against each other. Norton based the wizards’ magic on the use of mildly hallucinogenic drugs, psychological manipulation, and latent telepathy, which place the story within the realm of science fiction.

== Plot ==
On the hot, humid ocean world of Xecho Dane Thorson has just finished his part in preparing the Free Trader (i.e. tramp freighter) Solar Queen to begin her run on an interstellar mail route. While waiting for the ship they are to relieve on the route, Dane, Captain Jellico, and Medic Craig Tau are invited to visit Xecho’s sister planet, Khatka, by Chief Ranger Kort Asaki. A jungle world originally settled thousands of years before by native-African refugees from one of Earth’s atomic wars, Khatka is a safari world, essentially a giant hunting ground where big-game hunters come to try their skill against large, dangerous animals.

On Khatka the three starmen discover that Ranger Asaki is being undermined by a witch doctor named Lumbrilo. During a ceremony in which Lumbrilo has disguised himself as the local version of a lion, Medic Tau, who has studied magic on many worlds, conjures the image of an elephant, thereby earning Lumbrilo’s enmity.

On a visit to see Zoboru, a new, no-kill preserve, the three starmen, Ranger Asaki, and the flitter pilot are stranded in the jungle when their flitter crashes. The men must walk back to their base while avoiding encounters with Khatka’s dangerous fauna. One such encounter tells them that they are being tracked and herded by Lumbrilo.

In a deadly swamp the men come to a camp occupied by a small team of poachers. There Tau confronts Lumbrilo, turns his magic back on him, and sends him screaming into the jungle, thereby solving Ranger Asaki’s problem. Captain Jellico and his men then return to the Solar Queen for what they hope will be a nice quiet mail run.

== Sources ==
- Clute, John, “Norton, Andre”, The Encyclopedia of Science Fiction, Eds. John Clute, David Langford, Peter Nicholls and Graham Sleight, Gollancz, 28 May 2016. <http://www.sf-encyclopedia.com/entry/norton_andre>.
- Tuck, Donald H. (1974). The Encyclopedia of Science Fiction and Fantasy. Chicago: Advent. pg. 332. ISBN 0-911682-20-1.
