= Child's Play (module) =

Dungeons & Dragons adventure module

- Code: WG10
- Authors: Jean Rabe and Skip Williams
- First published: 1989

Child's Play is an adventure module published in 1989 for the Dungeons & Dragons fantasy role-playing game. It was originally created as an RPGA Network Tournament module for characters of levels 13 through 15.

== Plot summary ==
Child's Play is high-level introductory scenario to the 2nd edition rules, designed for beginning dungeon masters and player characters.

The monarchy of Rhesdain, nestled deep in Greyhawk, somewhere on the edge of the Yetil Mountains, is in danger of toppling. A group of young noblemen, among them a few of Queen Joanna Lune's grandchildren, have launched a campaign to turn the country into a democracy. The group claims a Constitution exists which proves Rhesdain was never intended to be a monarchy. The rebels claim the land is free and the people who live there, according to the constitution, are free to choose their own rulers.

== Publication history ==
WG10 Child's Play was written by Jean Rabe and Skip Williams, and published by TSR in 1989 as a 32-page booklet with an outer folder.
