= Postmarked the Stars =

1969 novel by Andre Norton

- First edition
- Author: Andre Norton
- Cover artist: Richard M. Powers
- Language: English
- Series: Solar Queen/Dane Thorson
- Genre: Science fiction
- Published: 1969 (Harcourt, Brace & World)
- Publication place: United States
- Media type: Print (Hardback)
- Pages: 223 (Hardback edition)
- OCLC: 23511
- Preceded by: Voodoo Planet
- Followed by: Redline the Stars (with P. M. Griffin)

Postmarked the Stars is a science fiction novel by American writer Andre Norton, first published in the United States in 1969 by Harcourt, Brace & World. It is part of the series about the adventures of the interstellar tramp freighter Solar Queen and her crew.

== Plot ==
Sick from being drugged, Dane Thorson staggers out of a flophouse on the planet Xecho and gets back to his ship, the Free Trader (i.e. tramp freighter) Solar Queen, just in time for the ship's blastoff on its first mail run to Trewsworld. Once the ship is secured, Dane and the crew find a man made up to look like Dane lying dead in Dane's bunk. After storing the corpse in a freezer, the crew discovers that part of their cargo, creatures called brachs, has become sentient. They find a radiation source that seems to be responsible for the change and which may have also changed the lathsmer embryos that they are carrying. For the nonce, until they can solve the mystery of the dead man and the radiation source, they put the brachs and the lathsmers into Solar Queen's lifeboat and Dane, astrogator Rip Shannon and engineer Ali Kamil land it on Trewsworld away from the starport to wait.

The usually bird-like lathsmers are hatching and looking more like dragons. They manage to escape into the wild and Dane and Ali go looking for them. During the hunt, with the male brach assisting with his telepathic ability, Dane finds a crawler with the crew murdered and robbed of their cargo. Returning to the lifeboat, the two men find Medic Tau waiting there with Ranger Wim Meshler, who tells them that the crew have all been arrested on a long list of charges, including the murder of the dead man they found.

After explaining the situation to Meshler, the men note that the dragon-like lathsmers are still on the loose. Using Meshler's flitter, Meshler, Tau, Dane and the brach find the dragons and capture them. As they attempt to return to the lifeboat a control beam pulls the flitter to an enemy camp. There the men are captured and the flitter destroyed. With the aid of the brach, Meshler, Tau, Dane, and the brach escape into the night.

Following a crawler track, they find the enemy's main base with monsters, mutated animals, in force-field pens. They also discover that they are inside one of the pens and must evade two monsters. The brach turns off the force-field, allowing the men to escape but also releasing the monsters. The men and the brach steal a flitter and escape, flying it to Cartl's holding, a large farmstead where they can call the authorities in Trewsport.

Another holding is being attacked by the released monsters, so Dane, Meshler and the brach go to help the evacuation. The enemy brings down the flitter, but can't use it, so they plan to use Dane and Meshler as bait to draw in a rescue flitter which they can then steal. The rescue flitter brings a team of Stellar Patrolmen, Trewsport Police, and the rest of Solar Queen's crew and they defeat the crooks.

Dane guides the rescue party to the crooks' base and the Patrol captures it before the crooks' spaceship can blast off. Thus begins the unraveling of a galaxy-wide criminal empire. The crew of the Solar Queen are allowed to acquire the crooks' spaceship cheaply and they will use it for interplanetary cargo runs in the Trewsworld system.

== Sources ==
- Clute, John. "Norton, Andre". The Encyclopedia of Science Fiction. Eds. John Clute, David Langford, Peter Nicholls and Graham Sleight. Gollancz, 28 May 2016. Web. 23 June 2016. <http://www.sf-encyclopedia.com/entry/norton_andre>.
- Schlobin, Roger C. & Irene R. Harrison, "Andre Norton: A Primary and Secondary Bibliography", Pg 10, 1994, NESFA Press (Framingham, MA), ISBN 0-915368-64-1.
