= Key Out of Time =

1963 novel by Andre Norton

- First edition
- Author: Andre Norton
- Cover artist: Giac Faragasso
- Language: English
- Series: The Time Traders
- Genre: Science fiction
- Publisher: World Publishing Co.
- Publication date: 1963
- Publication place: United States
- Media type: Print (hardcover, paperback, and electronic)
- Pages: 224
- Preceded by: The Defiant Agents
- Followed by: Firehand

Key Out of Time is a science fiction novel by American writer Andre Norton, set on the world, Hawaika, that appears to be a tropical paradise.

It is the fourth in Norton's series starts in The Time Traders, part of her Forerunner universe, and continues the series’ premise: A hostile encounter between Western heroes, and the Russian Communists, and the Baldies – a mysterious alien race that used time travel to alter Earth. In the previous novel, The Defiant Agents, events are treated as a Time Agent failure – but re-read that novel for a different interpretation.

== Plot ==
In the present day, Time Agents Ross Murdock and Gordon Ashe come with settlers to the water-dominated planet, Hawaika, to search remains from the distant past of the alien Baldies. They are assisted by intelligent dolphins, with whom the humans can communicate. While setting up their time gate, a storm destroys it and strands them in widely separated locations in Hawaika's unknown past.

Murdock learns from a native named Loketh that Gordon is being held in a castle. Murdock and Loketh are captured by seafaring Rovers, then join them. They liberate a Rover island that had been captured by the Baldies. Murdock convinces a coalition of natives that the Baldies are playing them against one another.

Murdock finds Ashe at last, in the company of the mystic and advanced Foanna, of whom there turns out to be only three – the last of their race. The Foanna set a trap for the Baldies, using their castle as bait, but with only three of them, they cannot win against the whole attacking force. Murdock and Ashe agree to a process that mentally joins them with the Foanna, and in a second encounter with the Baldies, they win.

In a final encounter, Murdock is teleported into a Baldy ship like the one familiar to him from Galactic Derelict, and sets its course to a random destination. The main Baldy installation is simultaneously attacked and the Baldies driven off the planet.

== Reception ==
Kirkus Reviews, strongly supportive after following the series for years, writes

Again, Andre Norton, one of the greats among writers of teenage science fiction (Galactic Derelict, 1959, p. 658, J-316, for one), has employed [her] boundless imagination ... Owing to the author’s exceptional mastery of detail, and astute control of plot, Key Out of Time stands as a novel which should more than satisfy young science fiction fanciers and fanatics.

== Publication history ==
Key out of Time was first published in 1963, and as of 2012, had been reprinted in 17 editions with cover changes, as well as twice in a combined edition with The Defiant Agents.

== Novels in the series ==
- The Time Traders (1958)
- Galactic Derelict (1959)
- The Defiant Agents (1962)
- Key Out of Time (1963)
- Firehand (1994) (with Pauline M Griffin)
- Echoes in Time (1999) (with Sherwood Smith)
- Atlantis Endgame (2002) (with Sherwood Smith)
