= The Halfblood Chronicles =

Novel series by Andre Norton and Mercedes Lackey

- Elvenbane; Elvenblood; Elvenborn; Elvenbred
- Author: Andre Norton; Mercedes Lackey; Ben Ohlander
- Country: United States
- Language: English
- Genre: Fantasy
- Publisher: Tor Books, Arc Manor
- Published: April 1991 – current
- Media type: Print

The Halfblood Chronicles is a series of fantasy books originally written by Andre Norton and Mercedes Lackey. The series is set in a mystical world of elves, wizards and dragons. The series was originally released by Tor Books, and comprised three books: Elvenbane (1991), Elvenblood (1995), Elvenborn (2002). Elvenbred, the fourth book in the series, was not finished due to the death of Andre Norton in 2005.

In 2025 Arc Manor acquired the rights to republish the original three books and the fourth book "Elvenbred", which was completed by Mercedes Lackey and Ben Ohlander and is expected to be released in March 2027.

== Novels ==
=== The Elvenbane (1991) ===
The Elvenbane was published November 1, 1991.

The world is dominated by elves, who came to the humans' world by a portal from their world, Evelon. The humans are treated as slaves and animals, but the elves have a good life. One thing mars their happiness, however, when a prophecy spread by the dragons says that a halfblood will come and bring about a revolution. Serina Daeth is the concubine of Elven-lord Dyran and pregnant with his child. Concubines bearing half-blood children to Elven-lords is not allowed, so concubines normally are given drugs in their food to prevent conception. Another of Dyran's concubines, vying for the top position, tampers with Serina's food, leading her to become pregnant. Serina escapes into the desert, where her child, Shana, is delivered by Alamarana, a dragon shaman who takes her home, where she is raised with Kemanorel, Alara's son.

Further into the story, Shana is expelled from the dragons' clan and gets into Elven lands. There she discovers that "two leggers" still exist, but she also discovers the misery lived by some of the human slaves and is barely rescued by free halfbloods. Halfbloods have power of the mind (telekinesis, telepathy...etc.) as part of their human heritage and some power over matter as part of their elven heritage. They were known as "wizards".

Shana is brought into a secret hideout of the remaining wizards and taught a bit about magic. She discovers on her own even more applications of her power. After she convinces a group of young wizard to steal some full-human kids that are to be "culled", she endangers the secret of the existence of wizards. Thereafter a war for survival pushes the wizards to fight some of the Elven Lords.

=== Elvenblood ===
Elvenblood was published June 1, 1995.

Shana and a group consisting of halfblood wizards, escaped human slaves, and dragon shamans have defeated the elves in one instance. A group known as the Iron People has remained undetected by the elvenlords. The method of their long-term survival is unknown.

The elven world is now changing with revolt a very close option for some, while this is happening Shana meets the ancient Iron People and discovers a secret which could help free her people or could break it down to nothing. She is helped by a pair running from their father's estate because of one dangerous reason – in their small group there is a halfblood and everyone is checking to see if they have halfbloods in their midst. Lady Sheyrena an Treves and her brother Lorryn help the wizards by giving the young Lords iron jewelry, since most of them are treated no better than slaves.

=== Elvenborn (2002) ===
Elvenborn was published October 1, 2002.

This story moves away slightly from Shana and her band of rebels and focuses on Kyrtian, an elvenlord who becomes a hero in the war scarred world in which they live. When his cousin, Aelmarkin, tries to prove Kyrtian is unfit to run the estate, Kyrtian gets more power than he wants. Kyrtian is different from the other lords and keeps the humans as servants than as slaves. Thanks to his father's legacy he stumbles upon an ancient secret. This long forgotten secret elevates him to Commander of the Elven Army.

The Young Lords have started rebelling against their fathers and are waging war. Kyrtian however has taken advantage of his new command and power, alongside some unexpected friends to embark on his own quest to find the Great Portal, through which the elvenlords entered this world. By finding this mystic gateway he hopes to find the reason for the disappearance of his own father and also unravel the secrets behind the origin of elvenkind. Once again the Great Portal is reopened only to hint at some strange transformation of the elves of Evelon.

== Reception ==
Kirkus Reviews criticized Elvenbane's "shallow characters and a lack of real tension", but stated that it was an overall entertaining book. Kirkus also reviewed Elvenblood and Elvenborn, writing that Elvenblood was "modestly appealing and involving, if lacking real bite". Publishers Weekly praised all three books, calling Elvenbane "one of the season's liveliest and most appealing fantasy epics".
