= Galactic Derelict =

1959 novel by Andre Norton

- First edition
- Author: Andre Norton
- Cover artist: Ed Emshwiller
- Language: English
- Series: The Time Traders
- Genre: Science fiction
- Publisher: World Publishing Company
- Publication date: 1959
- Publication place: United States
- Media type: Print (Hardcover, paperback, and electronic)
- Pages: 225
- Preceded by: The Time Traders
- Followed by: The Defiant Agents

Galactic Derelict is a science fiction novel by American writer Andre Norton, the second in her Time Traders series. It was first published in 1959, and as of 2012, had been reprinted in eight editions. It is part of Norton's Forerunner universe.

Galactic Derelict continues the series' premise, an encounter between Western heroes and a mysterious alien race that has used time travel to alter Earth. This novel shifts between present day and the time of Folsom Man, some 10,000 years ago.

Kirkus Reviews comments for this novel "Andre Norton has no peer in his [sic] chosen field of science fiction for teenagers ... [here] there's a hint of racial antagonism." (The novel has pointed comments about racism against American Indians.)

In the 2000 republished version Norton changed the word Reds to Russians. No change was made in the story.

== Plot ==
While seeking water for his cattle, Travis Fox enters a little known canyon in the Arizona desert and gets captured by three men, one of whom he recognizes as Dr. Gordon Ashe, an archaeologist. After discovering that Fox studied archaeology and had done some digging in the canyon they now occupy, the men have him cleared through security and offer to make him part of their team. Then Ashe tells him that he will be joining an expedition 10,000 years into the past to look for a spaceship.

Disguised as Folsom hunters, Fox, Ashe, and Ross Murdock travel into the past to scout out the area around the wreckage of an alien starship, a sphere perhaps 120 feet in diameter. They find the wreck near a lake and then, across a ridge, they find a smaller spaceship intact, its crew of alien "Baldies" dead. After receiving the scouts' report via transtemporal telegraph, Major Kelgarries and several technicians come into the past and examine the small ship, determining that they can shift it directly into the present.

Fox, Ashe, and Murdock serve as roving sentries in the area around the smaller globeship as technicians build a time transfer cage around it. On the day the transfer is to be made, ash from a volcanic explosion and a stampede of mammoths drive the three men into the ship along with Case Renfry, an electronics technician. An earthquake triggers the transfer, bringing the ship into the present. The ship's preset autopilot, jolted into action, takes the ship into space.

After carrying the men through hyperspace, the ship lands on a planet where faltering robots refuel the ship. Another leap through hyperspace brings the ship to the second planet of an alien solar system. The ship lands in a desert, sits for a couple of days, and then blasts off on a course that takes it to the system's Earth-like third planet. Upon landing, the ship indicates that the voyage has ended by ejecting a small disc from its autopilot.

Renfry attempts to understand the autopilot and to rewind the course "tape" while the three time agents explore the jungle-draped ruins of a once-great city, in which they have landed. After several weeks Renfry believes that he has succeeded and he attempts to launch the ship. The ship runs its course in reverse, pausing on the desert planet and the refueling station, and brings the four men back to Earth, landing on the very spot from which they had blasted off.

== Reviews ==
Floyd C. Gale of Galaxy Science Fiction rated the novel five stars out of five for children, stating that it had "All the classic elements that make a good juvenile – or a good adult book, for that matter – are present in full measure in Galactic Derelict". He concluded that it was "a top-notch science-adventure yarn".

== Novels in the series ==
- The Time Traders (1958)
- Galactic Derelict (1959)
- The Defiant Agents (1962)
- Key out of Time (1963)
- Firehand (1994) (with Pauline M Griffin)
- Echoes in Time (1999) (with Sherwood Smith)
- Atlantis Endgame (2002) (with Sherwood Smith)

== Sources ==
- Tuck, Donald H. (1974). The Encyclopedia of Science Fiction and Fantasy. Chicago: Advent. p. 331. ISBN 0-911682-20-1..
- Norton, Andre (1959). Galactic Derelict. Cleveland, World Pub. Co. OL 24746618M.
