= P. M. Griffin =

American speculative fiction writer (1947–2020)

- Born: July 5, 1947; Brooklyn, New York City, New York, US
- Died: August 11, 2020 (aged 73)
- Occupation: Writer
- Writing career
- Period: 1986–2020
- Genres: science fiction, military sf

Pauline Margaret Griffin (July 5, 1947 – August 11, 2020), who wrote as P. M. Griffin, was an American author of speculative fiction. She was predominately known for her Star Commandos military science fiction series (1986–2004), described as "untaxing" in her Encyclopedia of Science Fiction entry, as well as her contributions to various Andre Norton series, such as Time Traders, Solar Queen, and Witch World.

== Select bibliography ==
=== Star Commandos ===
- Star Commandos (1986)
- Colony in Peril (1987)
- Mission Underground (1988)
- Death Planet (1989)
- Mind Slayer (1990)
- Return to War (1990)
- Fire Planet (1990)
- Call to Arms (1991)
- Jungle Assault (1991)
- Watchdogs of Space (2003)
- Pariah (2003)
- War Prince (2004)

=== Time Traders ===
- Firehand (1994) with Andre Norton

=== Solar Queen ===
- Redline the Stars (1993) with Andre Norton

=== Witch World universe ===
- Witch World: The Turning: Storms of Victory (1991) with Andre Norton
- Seakeep (1991)
- Flight of Vengeance (1992) with Andre Norton and Mary H. Schaub
- Falcon Hope (1992)

=== Standalone novels ===
- Stand at Cornith (2014)
- Survivor (2014)
- Fell Conquest (2015)
- The Purgatorio Virus (2015)
- Haunted World (2016)
- Bad Neighbors (2016)
- The Elven King (2017)
- Rebels' World (2017)
