= Flashing Swords! 2 =

1973 anthology edited by Lin Carter

Flashing Swords! #2
- Cover art from the first hardcover edition
- Editor: Lin Carter
- Cover artist: Frank Frazetta
- Language: English
- Series: Flashing Swords!
- Genre: Fantasy
- Publisher: Nelson Doubleday
- Publication date: 1973
- Publication place: United States
- Media type: Print (Hardcover)
- Preceded by: Flashing Swords! #1
- Followed by: Flashing Swords! #3: Warriors and Wizards

Flashing Swords! #2 is an anthology of fantasy stories, edited by American writer Lin Carter. It was first published in hardcover by Nelson Doubleday in 1973 as a selection in its Science Fiction Book Club and in paperback by Dell Books in February 1974. The first British edition was issued by Mayflower in February 1975.

== Summary ==
The book collects four heroic fantasy novelettes by members of the Swordsmen and Sorcerers' Guild of America (SAGA), an informal literary group of fantasy authors active from the 1960s to the 1980s, of which Carter was also a member and guiding force, together with a general introduction and introductions to the individual stories by the editor.

== Contents ==
- "Introduction: Flashing Swords and Black Magicians" by Lin Carter
- "The Rug and the Bull" (Pusad) by L. Sprague de Camp
- "The Jade Man’s Eyes" (Elric of Melniboné) by Michael Moorcock
- "Toads of Grimmerdale" (Witch World) by Andre Norton
- "Ghoul’s Garden" (Brak the Barbarian) by John Jakes

== Reception ==
The anthology was reviewed by Carter himself in The Year's Best Fantasy Stories, 1975, and by Bert Duch in Amra v. 5, no. 65, April 1976.
