= Sasha Miller =

American writer

- Born: October 15, 1933 (age 92); Erick, Oklahoma, U.S.
- Occupation: Writer
- Writing career
- Pen name: Sasha Miller; Georgia Sallaska; Myrle Benedict; G. S. Madden
- Genre: Fantasy
- Website: www.sashamiller.com

Sasha Miller is the pseudonym of American fantasy writer Georgia Myrle Miller (born October 15, 1933 in Erick, Oklahoma). She has also written under the names Georgia Sallaska, Myrle Benedict, and G. S. Madden.

In 1958 and 1959 she published a trio of stories in Fantastic Universe as Myrle Benedict: "Sit by the Fire", "The Dancing that We Did", and "The Comanleigh". Fantastic editor Hans Stefan Santesson included "Sit by the Fire" in his best of anthology The Fantastic Universe Omnibus (1960). As Georgia Sallaska, she wrote three novels of historical fiction: Three Ships and Three Kings (1969), The Last Heracles (1971), and Priam's Daughter (1974).

In the 1980s she began publishing as Sasha Miller. She wrote a number of works set in Andre Norton's Witch World, including GURPS Witch World (1989) with Ben W. Miller, a rule book for the GURPS role-playing game system, and the novel Falcon Magic (1994), published in the On Wings of Magic omnibus. She also collaborated with Norton on the five novels in the Cycle of Oak, Yew, Ash, and Rowan series. Miller's fantasy novel Ladylord (1995), set in medieval Japan, was praised by reviewers.
