= Swamplight =

D&D game module

- Code: GA2
- TSR product code: 9424
- Authors: Jean Rabe
- First published: 1993

Swamplight is an adventure for the 2nd edition of the Advanced Dungeons & Dragons fantasy role-playing game, published in 1993.

== Publication history ==
The module was written by Jean Rabe and published by TSR.

== Contents ==
The module is a "general adventure" which can be set anywhere. This module, set in a dangerous swamp, is designed for player characters of level 7 to 9.

This module features an introduction for the Dungeon Master (DM) on the adventure; an Adventure Background for information for both the DM and the players; and finally a section guiding the DM through the encounters up to the resolution of the module.

== Reception ==
Gene Alloway reviewed Swamplight in a 1993 issue of White Wolf. He stated that it has good content and "is a great adventure for the price". He also noted that it "should keep your players more than busy for a night. If this is the trend in adventures for this series, I am looking forward to the next". Overall, Alloway rated the module a 4 out of a possible 5.
