= Heroic Fantasy (anthology) =

1979 anthology edited by Gerald W. Page and Hank Reinhardt

- Cover of the first edition
- Editors: Gerald W. Page and Hank Reinhardt
- Cover artist: Jad
- Language: English
- Genre: Fantasy
- Publisher: DAW Books
- Publication date: 1979
- Publication place: United States
- Media type: Print (paperback)
- Pages: 320
- ISBN: 0-87997-455-9
- OCLC: 4930482
- LC Class: CPB Box no. 1730 vol. 23

Heroic Fantasy is an anthology of fantasy stories, edited by Gerald W. Page and Hank Reinhardt. It was first published in paperback by DAW Books in April 1979.

The book collects fourteen short stories and novelettes by various fantasy authors, together with an overall introduction by both editors and three essays on arms by Reinhardt alone.

== Contents ==
- "Editor's Introduction" (Gerald W. Page) and (Hank Reinhardt)
- "Sand Sister" (Andre Norton)
- "The Valley of the Sorrows" (Galad Elflandsson)
- "Ghoul's-Head" (Donald J. Walsh, Jr.)
- "Commentary on Swords and Swordplay" (essay) (Hank Reinhardt)
- "Astral Stray" (Adrian Cole)
- "Blood in the Mist" (E. C. Tubb)
- "Commentary on Armor" (essay) (Hank Reinhardt)
- "The Murderous Dove" (Tanith Lee)
- "Death in Jukun" (Charles R. Saunders)
- "The De Pertriche Ring" (H. Warner Munn)
- "Commentary on Courage and Heroism" (essay) (Hank Reinhardt)
- "The Hero Who Returned" (Gerald W. Page)
- " The Riddle of the Horn" (Darrell Schweitzer)
- "The Age of the Warrior" (Hank Reinhardt)
- "The Mistaken Oracle" (A. E. Silas)
- "Demonsong" (F. Paul Wilson)
- "The Seeker in the Fortress" (Manly Wade Wellman)
