= Museum Replicas Ltd =

American period clothing and armor manufacturer

Museum Replicas Ltd. (MRL)
- Company type: Corporation
- Industry: Manufacturing
- Founded: Atlanta (1985; 41 years ago)
- Headquarters: Conyers, GA
- Key people: Hank Reinhardt (Founder), Pradeep Windlass (President)
- Products: Design, manufacture, reseller of Swords, Knives, historical arms, armor, period clothing, replicas
- Website: www.museumreplicas.com

Museum Replicas Ltd. (MRL) is a wholly owned subsidiary of Atlanta Cutlery Corp. (ACC) designing, replicating, manufacturing, reselling arms, armor and period clothing for men and women. It features swords, daggers, helmets, suits of armor, accessories, costumes and home accents with the historical themes of Greek, Roman, Viking, Medieval, Renaissance and the industrial niche of steampunk. MRL has supplied sets as well as acquired licensing rights for prop replicas and costumes for movies such as Star Wars, The Lord of the Rings, Harry Potter, Gladiator and Braveheart. MRL products are sold retail and wholesale in approved territories globally. MRL is also part of the Windlass Group. It has its manufacturing facilities at Dehradun in India, Conyers, Georgia and Atlanta, Georgia in the US and Toledo in Spain.

== History ==
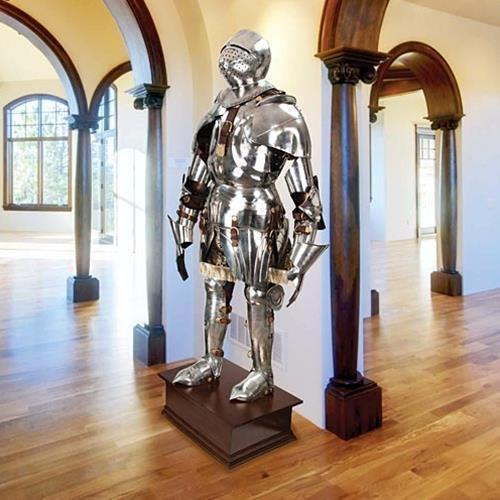
Gothic Suit of Armor, hand forged by Windlass Steelcrafts, is made of 18 gauge steel. Complete with full skeletal body and decorative skirt and leather straps. It comes with wooden pedestal making this piece stand approximately 6-1/2 feet tall!

In 1985, Hank Reinhardt (American author, armorer and medieval weaponry authority) came together with Atlanta Cutlery Corp (ACC) founder Bill Adams to expand ACC knife offerings to affordable medieval swords and related historical weapons, armor and accessories. On a trip to Europe they discovered the Del Tin brothers in Italy producing historically researched and accurate swords at prices that they considered relatively affordable. Over the next decade MRL focused on historical edged weapons like daggers, maces, axes, pole arms, helmets, armor, shields and period clothing. The firm produced various replicas, many made and tested by Reinhardt himself. In 1995 ACC founder Bill Adams eventually retired and the company was sold to its primary supplier of parts and blades - Windlass Steelcrafts - the largest sword maker in the world.

Over the next two decades MRL established business partnerships with Studio Canal SA, Paramount, Warner Bros., Universal, 20th Century Fox, Disney, HBO, Starz, Lucasfilm, Sony, Marvel, DC, Gaming companies like Blizzard Entertainment, Ubisoft and popular authors like Robert Jorden, RR Martin and Brent Weeks. This foray into entertainment was a key catalyst for the widest selection of products made in the company's 30-year history.

In 2011, Atlanta Cutlery Corp, acquired Marto, a leading European company in Toledo, Spain that manufactures decorative historical swords.

== Products ==
MRL creates mostly original and some licensed consumer line products for companies and individuals. Some of its significant licensed works are life size replicas and/or props from movies, TV, books and more.

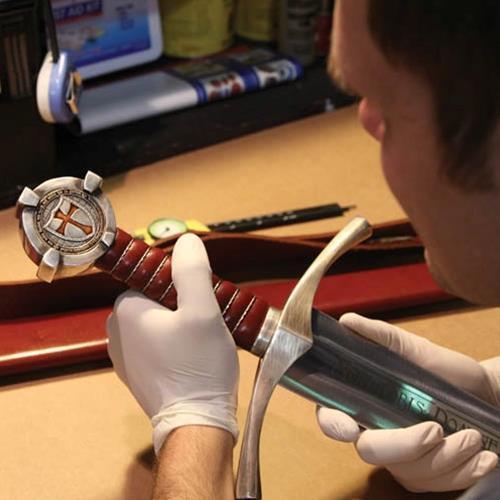
Trained Staff handling the Accolade sword of the Knights Templar

A list of products include historical collectibles:

- Hand-Forged Swords, Knives & Daggers
- Helmets, Armor & Shields
- Women's Costumes & Accessories
- Men's Costumes & Accessories
- Children's Costumes & Toys
- Jewelry
- Home Décor & Accessories

The MRL staff includes experts from the fields of metallurgy, forging, research and the accurate and practical use of historical items from swords and armor to clothing. Museums are a primary source for inspiration and research.

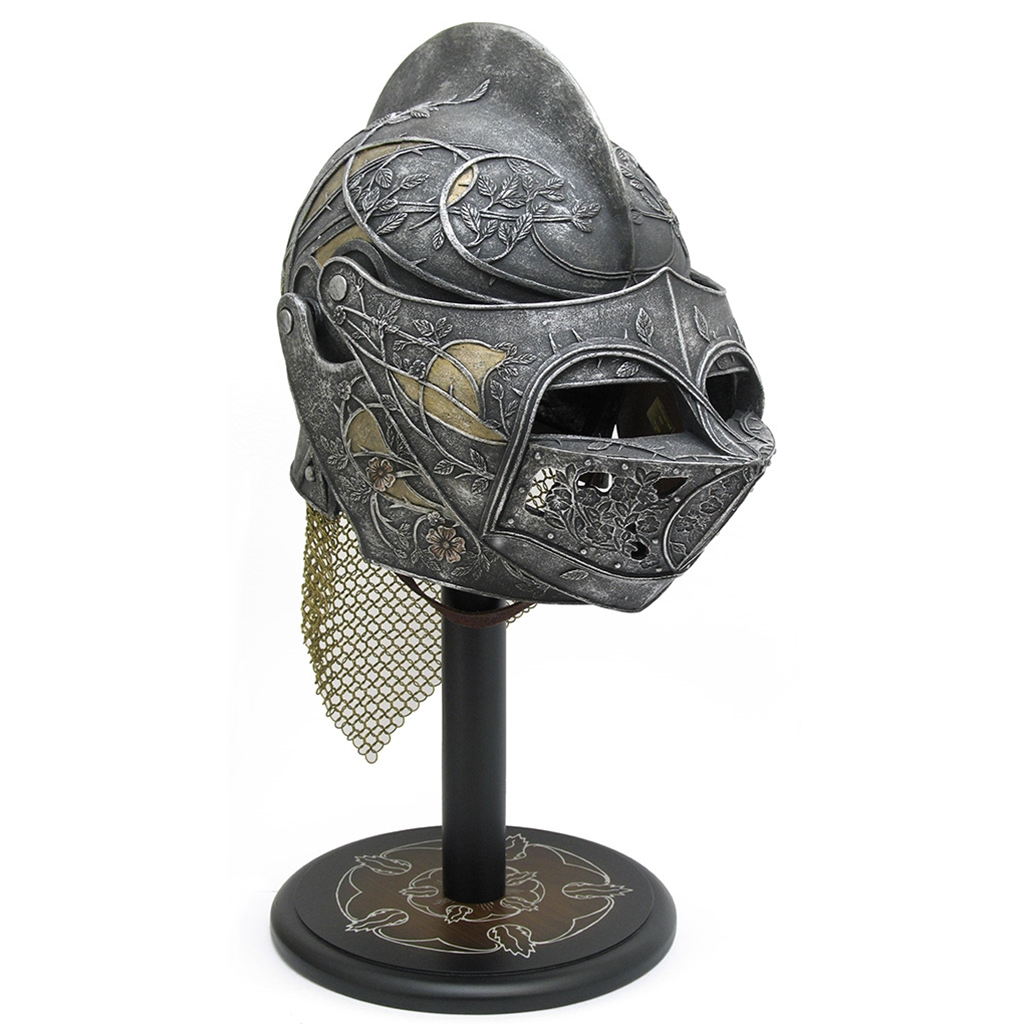
Fiberglass replica of the helm worn by Loras Tyrell in Game of Thrones.
