= Return to Quag Keep =

2006 novel by Andre Norton and Jean Rabe

- Cover of the first edition
- Author: Andre Norton, Jean Rabe
- Cover artist: Justin Sweet
- Language: English
- Genre: Fantasy novel
- Published: 2006
- Publisher: Tor Books
- Publication place: United States
- Media type: Print
- ISBN: 9780765312983
- Preceded by: Quag Keep

Return to Quag Keep, a 2006 fantasy novel by Andre Norton and Jean Rabe, is a sequel to the fantasy novel Quag Keep written by Norton in 1978. Although Norton and Rabe began their collaboration in the early 2000s, Norton's death in 2005 meant that Rabe had to complete the novel on her own. Many critics were not impressed with the finished work.

== Plot summary ==
In Norton's previous book Quag Keep, seven Dungeons & Dragons (D&D) players had been mysteriously transported to the world of Greyhawk. In this sequel, the adventurers trapped in Greyhawk regain their memories and learn that they are gamers from Earth. They seek to return home.

== Publication history ==
Gary Gygax co-invented the game of D&D, and formed the company TSR in 1974 to publish the new game. Two years later, Gygax invited the popular sf/fantasy author Andre Norton to play a session of D&D set within his own home campaign world of Greyhawk. Norton subsequently wrote a novel titled Quag Keep, which was the first published novel based on a tabletop role-playing game. The book was published in 1978.

In the early 2000s, Norton and Jean Rabe began to collaborate on a sequel to Quag Keep, but Norton died before the book was completed. Rabe subsequently finished Return to Quag Keep, which was published by Tor Books in 2006.

== Reception ==
Critics were unimpressed by this novel. Publishers Weekly didn't think Rabe's writing compared to her predecessor's, saying, "For the most part, the story and characters lack the magic and imagination typical of the late SF Grand Master Norton at her best."

Don D'Ammassa also reviewed Rabe's sequel for the Science Fiction Chronicle and called it "another routine quest adventure with the same cast of characters. It's not a bad story, but it doesn't read like something Norton would have written, not does it feel like it's based on a role-playing game."

Kirkus Reviews called it "Derivative, stale rubbish."
