= Hank Reinhardt =

American writer, editor, and science fiction fan

Julius Henry Reinhardt
- Born: January 18, 1934; Atlanta, Georgia
- Died: October 30, 2007 (aged 73); Athens, Georgia
- Occupations: editor, author, arms authority
- Spouse(s): Janet Reinhardt; Toni Weisskopf

Julius Henry ("Hank") Reinhardt (January 18, 1934 – October 30, 2007) was an American author, editor, science fiction fan, and noted armorer and authority on medieval weaponry. He wrote as Hank Reinhardt, the nickname by which he was widely known. He was the husband of editor Toni Weisskopf, formerly married to publisher Jim Baen, whom she succeeded as publisher of Baen Books.

== Life and family ==
Reinhardt was born and raised in Atlanta, Georgia. He served in the U.S. Army in Europe in the 1950s. He later lived for many years in Alabama. He was married twice, first to Janet, who predeceased him and with whom he had two daughters, and second to Toni Weisskopf. He died in Athens, Georgia at the age of seventy-three of a staph infection contracted in the wake of heart bypass surgery. He was survived by his second wife, daughters Dana and Cathy, and two grandchildren.

== Career ==
Interested in knives and swords from an early age, Reinhardt furthered his education in arms during his Army service and through visits to various European museums. Back in America he held a number of jobs before joining in the 1980s with Bill Adams, president of Atlanta Cutlery, to establish Museum Replicas Ltd, a mail order firm specializing in recreations of medieval weaponry and armor. Thanks in part to Reinhardt's access to the Tower of London Armories, facilitated by his friendship with Ewart Oakeshott, the Armories' head curator, the firm was able to produce quality replicas, many made and tested by Reinhardt himself. He remained connected to the company as a consultant until his death, and also served as a consultant to other sword makers.

== Literary career ==
Reinhardt was a prolific author of articles on swords and knives, and wrote a column on swords in the movies for Blade magazine. Together with Gerald W. Page he edited the anthology Heroic Fantasy (DAW Books, 1979. He had a book on the history of the sword in progress at the time of his death. It was published after his death by Baen Books as The Book of Swords. He also produced two videos on the sword with Paladin Press. In addition, he played an integral role in Reclaiming the Blade, which includes an in depth interview detailing his experiences in Historical European Martial Arts (HEMA).

== Career in science fiction fandom ==
A pivotal figure in Southern science fiction fandom for more than half a century, Reinhardt helped establish ASFO, the earliest science fiction club in Atlanta, Georgia, in 1950. He subsequently co-founded the first such club in Birmingham, Alabama as well. He served as a guest speaker, panelist on arms and armor, and demonstrator of medieval fighting techniques at many science fiction conventions. He also founded the Historical Armed Combat Association and branches of the Society for Creative Anachronism in Alabama, Georgia, and Louisiana.

== Recognition ==
Reinhardt received a number of awards in recognition of his fan activity and promotion of medieval weaponry, including the 1973 Rebel Award, DragonCon's 1990 Georgia Fandom Award (of which he was the inaugural recipient), and the 2006 Blade Show in Atlanta's Industry Achievement Award.

== Published works ==
=== Anthologies edited ===
- Heroic Fantasy (with Gerald W. Page) (1979)

=== Short stories ===
- "Fearn" (1978)
- "Farewell, Mars" (1970) (with Gerald W. Page) (1970)
- "The Age of the Warrior" (1979)

=== Nonfiction ===
- Commentary on Armor (1979)
- Commentary on Courage and Heroism (1979)
- Commentary on Swords and Swordplay (1979)
- Editor's Introduction (with Gerald W. Page) (1979)
- Hype - An Ancient an Art as Swordmaking
- There Is No Best Sword
- Hank Reinhardt's The Book of Swords (Baen, August 2009) ISBN 978-1-4391-3281-4

=== Reviews ===
- "An Army at Dawn - Rick Atkinson"
- "The Archer’s Tale - Bernard Cornwell"
- "The Barbarians of Asia - Stuart Legg"
- "Blood Red Roses - Fiorato, Boylston & Knusel"
- "Catastrophe - David Keys"
- "Demonic Males - Wrangham & Peterson"
- "Ghost Soldiers - Hampton Sides"
- "Guns & Violence: The English Experience - Joyce Lee Malcolm"
- "Jane Goodall’s Return to Goombe"
- "The Long Ships - Frans G. Bengtsson"
- "The Mighty Manslayer and The Curved Sword - Harold Lamb"
- "The Power of Logical Thinking - Marilyn Vos Savant & How To Think Straight - Robert Thouless"
- "A Short History of Nearly Everything - Bill Bryson"
- "Slander - Ann Coulter"
