= High Sorcery =

Book by Andre Norton

- Cover of the first edition
- Author: Andre Norton
- Illustrator: Jack Gaughan
- Cover artist: Gray Morrow; Steve Hickman
- Language: English
- Genre: Fantasy
- Publisher: Ace Books
- Publication date: 1970
- Publication place: United States
- Media type: Print (Paperback)
- Pages: 156
- OCLC: 01984336
- LC Class: PS3527.O632 H5 1970

High Sorcery is a collection of fantasy short stories by American writer Andre Norton, and illustrated by the likes of Gray Morrow, Jack Gaughan, and Steve Hickman. It was first published in paperback by Ace Books in March 1970, and was reprinted by the same publisher in 1971, 1973, and 1976; a second edition, reset but otherwise unchanged, was published in paperback by Ace in March 1979, and was reprinted in 1982 and 1984. All printings of the first edition bore cover art by artist Gray Morrow, which was replaced in all printings of the second edition with new art by Steve Hickman.

== Summary ==
The book collects five novellas and short stories by Norton, including the "Witch World" story "Ully the Piper".

== Contents ==
- "Wizards' World" (from If, v, 17, no. 6, June 1967)
- "Through the Needle's Eye" (original to this collection)
- "By a Hair" (from Phantom Magazine, July 1958)
- "Ully the Piper" (original to this collection)
- "Toys of Tamisan" (from If, v. 19, nos. 4–5, April–May 1969)

== Bibliography ==
- Fantasy Stories (1994), compiled by Diana Wynne Jones, written by The Brothers Grimm (Wilhelm Grimm and Jacob Grimm), Jane Yolen, Tove Jansson, Andre Norton, Norton Juster, Joan Aiken, C. S. Lewis, Katharine Mary Briggs, Isaac Asimov, John Masefield, L. Frank Baum, Rudyard Kipling, Eva Ibbotson, Elizabeth Goudge, E. Nesbit, Patricia C. Wrede, Andrew Lang, and Diana Wynne Jones, illustrated by Wayne Anderson and Robin Lawrie, published by Kingfisher Books
