= The Time Traders =

1958 novel by Andre Norton

- First edition
- Author: Andre Norton
- Cover artist: Virgil Finlay
- Language: English
- Series: The Time Traders
- Genre: Science fiction
- Publisher: World Publishing Co.
- Publication date: 1958
- Publication place: United States
- Media type: Print (Hardcover, paperback, and electronic)
- Pages: 219
- Followed by: Galactic Derelict

The Time Traders is a science fiction novel by American writer Andre Norton, the first in The Time Traders series. It was first published in 1958, and has been printed in several editions. It was updated by Norton in 2000 to account for real world changes. It is part of Norton's Forerunner universe.

The Time Traders introduces the premise: a confrontation between Western heroes and the "Reds", AKA the Soviets, plus the "Baldies", a mysterious alien race that has used time travel to alter Earth. This novel alternates among the present day, a trading tribal society in Britain, 2000 B.C., and a glacial outpost in the last ice age.

== Premise ==
In her Time Trader novels, Norton tacitly assumes that the physics of time travel differs so significantly from the physics of space travel, especially hyperdrive-propelled interstellar flight, that a civilization that discovers the technology of one simply will not discover the technology of the other. Earth’s physicists have discovered the secret of time travel, but the engineers and scientists who built and use the time transporters have devised a clever way to obtain the secrets of space travel: if it is not possible to discover the secrets, we get them from someone who did.

== Plot ==
The outline below follows the 1958 version; afterward, the changes in the 2000 edition are described.

At the end of the twentieth century, petty criminal Ross Murdock is given the choice of facing a new psychiatric medical procedure called rehabilitation or volunteering to join a secret government project. Hoping for a chance to escape, Ross volunteers to join Operation Retrograde and is taken by Major John Kelgarries to a base built under the ice near the North Pole. Teamed with archaeologist Gordon Ashe, he is trained to mimic a trader of the Beaker culture of Bronze-Age Europe.

Sent back to southern Britain around 2000 B.C., Ross and Ashe (as Rossa and Assha) find that their outpost has been bombed. According to two of the natives, it was destroyed by the wrath of Lurgha, the local storm god. Discovering the direction whence the bomber came and other clues pointing to the general area occupied by a Soviet base, Ross, Ashe, and McNeil, the lone survivor of the bombing, go to that area.

Somewhere near the Baltic Sea, Ross, Ashe, and McNeil begin building a Beaker trading post and learn from the locals that to their southeast lies a land populated by ghosts, a land whither no man of good sense would go. Ross gets separated from Ashe and McNeil in a night attack and must go into the taboo area alone in an effort to find them. Far inside the ghostland he finds the Soviet base and is captured by the Reds.

In an effort to escape, Ross steps onto the base's transporter plate and is transferred to a Soviet base even further back in time. The Reds recapture him and take him outside the base, abandoning him on a glacier to freeze to death. He climbs out of the crevice into which he was shoved and follows the trail leading away from the Soviet base, coming to a giant globe half buried in the ice. Half dead from the abuse he has received, he enters the globe and then falls through a panel and into a tub full of transparent-red gel.

When he regains consciousness, Ross discovers that all of his wounds are healed, he is no longer hungry or thirsty, and his Beaker-folk clothing is gone. A mechanism offers him a skin-tight suit made of an iridescent dark-blue fabric that covers all but his head and his hands. He explores what is clearly some kind of ship and is recaptured by the Reds, but not before he activates the ship’s communication system and comes face to face with a hostile-looking humanoid with a large bald head.

The Reds' interrogation of Ross is interrupted by explosions that rock the base. Ross is reunited with Ashe and McNeil and the three men escape to the time transporter, pausing only to steal some recording tapes. Back in the Soviet Bronze-Age base, the men leave the time-travel building and escape from the village just as the alien Baldies attack. The men then make their way to the river that will take them to the Baltic Sea to be picked up by their submarine (disguised as a whale).

Ross is again separated from Ashe and McNeil when he falls off their hastily built and uncontrollable raft. He discovers that the Baldies are hunting him when he is captured by warriors from a barbarian tribe. Again he escapes and continues down the river, reaching the sea and the camp occupied by Ashe and/or McNeil only hours after the sub took them away. Two of the Baldies attempt to capture him with telepathic hypnosis, but they flee when Kelgarries and his men arrive. Leaving the alien skinsuit on the beach so that the Baldies can't trace the Americans to their base, the men take Ross to the sub and home. There, Ashe tells him that the tapes he stole indicate other alien spaceships abandoned on Earth, at least three of them in the Americas. Operation Retrograde is about to become much more interesting and Ross still wants to be part of the action.

=== Changes in the 2000 edition ===
The 2000 version Norton modified the 1958 version by making three changes in the text:

- She reset the story in the first quarter of the Twenty-First Century instead of in the last quarter of the Twentieth, shifting the action future-ward by a full generation.
- The “Reds” have become the Russians and Greater Russia has replaced the Soviet Union.
- Space travel has not gone beyond the first lunar landings instead of having not gotten beyond the first attempts to put satellites into orbit. Instead of being ridiculed as impossible, space travel is publicly ridiculed as infeasible.

== Reception ==
Floyd C. Gale wrote that "Traders gets Miss Norton back solidly and admirably on her track of excellence", and was one of her "topnotchers".

== Novels in the series ==
- The Time Traders (1958)
- Galactic Derelict (1959)
- The Defiant Agents (1962)
- Key Out of Time (1963)
- Firehand (1994) (with Pauline M Griffin)
- Echoes in Time (1999) (with Sherwood Smith)
- Atlantis Endgame (2002) (with Sherwood Smith)

== Sources ==
- Clute, John. "Norton, Andre." The Encyclopedia of Science Fiction. Eds. John Clute, David Langford, Peter Nicholls and Graham Sleight. Gollancz, 12 June 2014. Web. 23 Aug. 2014. <https://www.sf-encyclopedia.com/entry/norton_andre>.
- Schlobin, Irene R., and Harrison, Roger C., Andre Norton: a primary and secondary bibliography, NESFA Press (P.O. Box 809, Framingham, MA, 01701-0809), 1998, pg. 5, ISBN 0-915368-64-1.
- Tuck, Donald H. (1974). The Encyclopedia of Science Fiction and Fantasy. Chicago: Advent. pg. 332. ISBN 0-911682-20-1.
