= Witch World (novel) =

1963 novel by Andre Norton

- Cover of first edition, 1967 printing
- Author: Andre Norton
- Cover artist: Jack Gaughan
- Language: English
- Series: Witch World
- Genre: Science fantasy
- Publisher: Ace Books
- Publication date: 1963
- Publication place: United States
- Media type: Print (paperback original)
- Pages: 222 (first ed.)
- ISBN: 0-8398-2355-X (Gregg, 1977)
- OCLC: 1403433
- LC Class: PZ3.N8187 Wj5 PS3527.O632 (Gregg Press, 1977)
- Followed by: Web of the Witch World

Witch World is a science fantasy novel by American writer Andre Norton, published as a paperback original by Ace Books in 1963. It inaugurated the Witch World series and established a setting that Norton eventually shared with other writers.

The first hardcover edition was published by Gregg Press of Boston in 1977 as #1 in a set of seven called "The Witch World Novels of Andre Norton". Later it appeared in three-novel omnibus editions and as an audiobook.

== Plot summary ==
During World War II, Simon Tregarth rose from a common soldier in the U.S. Army to the rank of lieutenant colonel. In post-war Berlin, he became involved in the black market, only to be caught and discharged in disgrace from the Army. He later also managed to anger a powerful criminal organization enough for it to send assassins after him. After months on the run, he knows his time is running out.

Then Tregarth is contacted by Dr. Jorge Petronius, a man with an amazing reputation for hiding men in dire straits. Petronius recounts a fantastic tale of a stone of power, the Siege Perilous of Arthurian legend, that has the power to open a gateway to a world attuned to the person who sits on it. Disbelieving, but with little to lose, Tregarth gives him all the money he has left, and is transported to a land where magic vies with more mundane swords and bows.

He arrives in a nearly empty countryside, just in time to witness a savage hunt: a lone woman being chased down by hounds followed by two horsemen. Tregarth rescues the woman, who he much later learns is a witch, and enters the service of her homeland Estcarp, a land ruled by witches and threatened by many enemies. One of these enemies is the land of Gorm, which was bloodily taken over by the far-off, mysterious realm of Kolder.

Estcarp's sole trusted ally is a nation of seafaring traders, the Sulcarmen. When Magnis Osberic, leader of the Sulcarmen, requests help at their citadel, Sulcarkeep, Tregarth and the witch are among those sent to its aid. On the way, they are ambushed by, but defeat, men who appear to be mind-controlled by some unseen entity. Afterwards, Koris, a refugee from Gorm and now Estcarp's Captain, recognizes some of the bodies as men of Gorm. The group reaches the island fortress of Sulcarkeep, but most of the Sulcarmen are away in the season of trading, and an attack including troops coming from the air overwhelms the few defenders. While a handful of survivors flee in small boats, Osberic remains behind to blow up Sulcarkeep, taking many of the enemy with him.

The violence of the explosion causes the tiny vessels to founder; Tregarth and the witch both reach land, but are separated. The witch is captured by Fulk of Verlaine, a coastal lord, but then helped to escape by Loyse, his daughter. Together, the two women make their way to Kars, capital of Estcarp's restive southern neighbor Karsten. Tregarth, guided by a mental link with the witch, is reunited with her there.

Soon afterwards, Karsten erupts in a frenzy of killing targeting those of the Old Race, the principal ethnic group of Estcarp. Tregarth, the witch, Koris and Loyse flee the carnage. Tregarth organizes a guerrilla force, drawing on his military experience, but is caught and shipped to Gorm to be turned into a mindless slave, like those encountered on the way to Sulcarkeep; however, he is able to escape.

The witches of Estcarp launch an attack on Gorm's capital city. When Tregarth fights and kills the enemy leader, during the intense struggle, he inadvertently achieves a mental rapport with his opponent and learns that the people of Kolder are like him in some respects; they are a small number of soldiers, refugees from another universe, though one with a higher level of technology than Earth. Estcarp is victorious, but the threat from Kolder remains.

The story is concluded in the sequel, Web of the Witch World, which with Witch World makes one complete story.

== Awards and honors ==
Witch World was nominated for the 1964 Hugo Award.

It was ranked 28th in Locus magazine's 1998 all-time poll of the best fantasy novels (before 1990).

== Sources ==
- Tuck, Donald H. (1978). The Encyclopedia of Science Fiction and Fantasy. Chicago: Advent. p. 332. ISBN 0-911682-22-8.
