= Jean Rabe =

American journalist and writer (1957–2026)

- Born: June 19, 1957; Ottawa, Illinois, U.S.
- Died: January 19, 2026 (aged 68); Urbana, Illinois, U.S.
- Education: Northern Illinois University (BS)
- Occupations: Writer, Editor
- Spouse: Bruce Rabe

Jean Rabe (19 June 1957 – 19 January 2026) was an American journalist, editor, gamer and writer of fantasy and mystery. After a career as a newspaper reporter, she was employed by TSR, Inc. for several years as head of the Role Playing Game Association and editor of the Polyhedron magazine. Rabe began a career as a novelist for TSR and Wizards of the Coast, and over the last 30 years has produced over three dozen books and scores of short stories, at first in the genres of game-related fantasy and science fiction and later as an author of mystery novels.

Rabe wrote game accessories and novels for the Dungeons & Dragons fantasy worlds of Greyhawk, Forgotten Realms and Dragonlance, and contributed to West End Games' Star Wars: The Roleplaying Game and FASA's BattleTech product lines. She served the Science Fiction and Fantasy Writers of America as business manager and editor of the association's SFWA Bulletin until 2013.

Rabe became known for collaborations with Andre Norton and a series of short story anthologies frequently co-edited with Martin H. Greenberg. Rabe admitted she had ghost written a few works, and had co-written fiction and non-fiction works with such diverse writers as Gene DeWeese, Stephen D. Sullivan, Don Bingle, and F. Lee Bailey. She wrote her first "Piper Blackwell mystery" novel in 2018 and published five books in the series.

== Early life ==
Jean Rabe was born in Ottawa, Illinois, and learned to play games at an early age—checkers, chess, and euchre by the age of 7, and board wargames in high school. In 1974 she enrolled in journalism at Northern Illinois University. In her junior year, while attending the inaugural Windycon games convention, she was introduced to the fantasy role-playing game Dungeons & Dragons, which had just been published by TSR earlier that year. She subsequently took up the game as a hobby and social activity. She graduated from Northern Illinois with a Bachelor of Science in Journalism.

== Career ==
=== Journalism ===
After graduating from university, Rabe worked as a newspaper reporter and bureau chief for the Quincy Herald-Whig in Quincy, Illinois. Rabe joined the Evansville Courier & Press in Evansville, Indiana in late 1983, covering critical news subjects like labor relations, prison conditions, and groundwater contamination, but frequently writing stories which highlighted her love of animals. Before Christmas 1985, reporter Rabe was dispatched to Fort Campbell, Kentucky to cover President Reagan's visit consoling family members after a tragic crash at Gander, Newfoundland took the lives of 256 servicemen and crew. Although others got the front page bylines, the Courier & Press credited Rabe with essential journalism which significantly affected the coverage. Rabe later worked as a stringer for the Rockford Register Star.

=== Gamer ===
TSR hired Rabe in 1987 to coordinate the RPGA Network. She also used her writing skills to create magazine articles and novels. In addition, Rabe wrote and edited Dungeons & Dragons and Gamma World adventure modules.

Rabe became the editor of a BattleTech magazine, MechForce Quarterly, in 1995. For Dragonlance, TSR had Rabe write the next major event for Krynn after Dragons of Summer Flame, which came to be the Dragons of a New Age trilogy, beginning with The Dawning of a New Age (1996).

When Wizards of the Coast purchased TSR, they published the rest of Rabe's Dragons of a New Age trilogy before bringing back Margaret Weis and Tracy Hickman as the main authors of Dragonlance. Her Dragons of a New Age trilogy consisted of Dawning of a New Age, Day of the Tempest, and Eve of the Maelstrom. Her other Dragonlance work includes Maquesta Kar-Thon, co-authored with Tina Daniell, and The Silver Star. Her other work for TSR includes Red Magic, Secret of the Djinn, and Night of the Tiger. Rabe also created content for Imperium Games. Rabe worked with Janet Pack on The Forces of Dagnarus for the Sovereign Stone role-playing game.

She also wrote more than four dozen short stories, including stories set in the Dragonlance, Forgotten Realms, and Star Wars settings. Three of her Star Wars short stories—"The Breath of Gelgelar", "Day of the Sepulchral Night", and "The Farrimmer Cafe"—have been published in the Star Wars Adventure Journals. She wrote science fiction stories for Martin H. Greenberg's office in Green Bay, Wisconsin, and coedited a number of all-original anthologies with Greenberg for DAW Books.

=== Writer ===
Rabe also wrote articles for On The Lake, a local magazine for tourists. In 2005, Rabe served as a juror for the Andre Norton Award for young adult fiction, which was established that year.

Rabe was the business manager and later the editor of the bimonthly SFWA Bulletin, published by the Science Fiction and Fantasy Writers of America. In June 2013, Rabe resigned the post in the course of a controversy about alleged sexism in SFWA Bulletin articles written by, among others, Mike Resnick and Barry N. Malzberg.

== Awards ==
Dragonlance: Death March was nominated for the 2009 Special Gaming Scribe Award—awarded by the International Association of Media Tie-in Writers—for "Best Original gaming-related tie-in novel of 2009".

In 2020 the IAMTW elected her Grandmaster.

== Bibliography ==
=== Dungeons & Dragons modules ===
- Rabe, Jean; Williams, Skip (1989). Child's Play. WG10. World of Greyhawk: TSR, inc. p. 32. ISBN 0-88038-756-4. 9265.
- Rabe, Jean; Rabe, Bruce (1989). Terrible Trouble at Tragidore. Generic Setting. Included with the 2nd edition Dungeon Master's Screen.: TSR, inc.
- Rabe, Jean (1989). Vale of the Mage. WG12. World of Greyhawk: TSR, inc. p. 64. ISBN 0-88038-816-1. 9270XXXX1401.
- Rabe, Jean (1993). Swamplight. GA2. TSR, inc. p. 32. ISBN 1-56076-588-7. 9424XXX1501.

=== Dragonlance series ===
- 1993 Krynnspace, a crossover setting for Dragonlance and Spelljammer
- 1995 Maquesta Kar-Thon, with Tina Daniell
- 1996 The Dawning of a New Age, Dragons of a New Age series
- 1997 Day of the Tempest, Dragons of a New Age series
- 1998 Eve of the Maelstrom, Dragons of a New Age series
- 1999 The Silver Stair, Bridges of Time series
- 2000 Downfall, the Dhamon Saga
- 2001 Betrayal, the Dhamon Saga
- 2002 Redemption, the Dhamon Saga
- 2004 The Lake of Death, Age of Mortals series
- 2007 The Rebellion, The Stonetellers series
- 2008 Death March, The Stonetellers series
- 2009 Goblin Nation, The Stonetellers series

=== Novels connected to other fantasy role-playing settings ===
- 1991 Red Magic, a Forgotten Realms: The Harpers series
- 1994 Secret of the Djinn, Endless Quest series
- 1995 Night of the Tiger, Endless Quest series
- 1996 Sands of Deception, Endless Quest series
- 2004 The Finest Creation, Finest Trilogy
- 2005 The Finest Choice, Finest Trilogy
- 2006 The Finest Challenge, Finest Trilogy
- 2006 Aftershock, a Shadowrun novel with John Helfers
- 2006 Return to Quag Keep, with Andre Norton
- 2006 A Taste of Magic, with Andre Norton
- 2007 Fenzig's Fortune
- 2008 Dragon Mage, with Andre Norton
- 2018 The Bone Shroud
- 2018 Shadows Down Under, a Shadowrun novel
- 2024 The Love-Haight Case Files, with Donald J. Bingle

=== Piper Blackwell Mysteries series ===
- 2018 The Dead of Winter: A Piper Blackwell Mystery
- 2018 The Dead of Night: A Piper Blackwell Mystery
- 2019 The Dead of Summer: A Piper Blackwell Mystery
- 2020 The Dead of Jerusalem Ridge: A Piper Blackwell Mystery
- 2022 The Dead of Autumn: A Piper Blackwell Mystery
- 2023 The Dead of Sled Run: A Piper Blackwell Mystery

=== Anthologies edited by Rabe ===
- Historical Hauntings, with Martin H. Greenberg (DAW, 2001; ISBN 0-88677-992-8)
- Sol's Children, with Martin H. Greenberg (DAW, 2002)
- Renaissance Faire, with Andre Norton (DAW, 2005)
- Furry Fantastic, with Brian M Thomsen (DAW, 2006; ISBN 0-7564-0381-2)
- Time Twisters, with Martin H Greenberg (DAW, 2007; ISBN 0-7564-0405-3)
- Pandora's Closet, with Martin H Greenberg (DAW, 2007; ISBN 0-7564-0437-1)
- Terribly Twisted Tales, with Martin H. Greenberg (DAW, May 2009; ISBN 0-7564-0554-8)
- Spells of the City, with Martin H. Greenberg (DAW, 2009; ISBN 0-7564-0567-X)
- Timeshares, with Martin H Greenberg (DAW, 2010; ISBN 0-7564-0615-3)
- Stalking the Wild Hare: Stories from the Gen Con Writer's Symposium, with John Helfers, Chris Pierson, and Marc Tassin (Walkabout Publishing, May 2010; ISBN 978-0-9821-7990-1)
- Steampunk'd, with Martin H. Greenberg (DAW, 2010; ISBN 978-0-7564-0643-1)
- Boondocks Fantasy with Martin H. Greenberg (DAW, 2011; ISBN 0-7564-0653-6))
- Blue Kingdoms
  - Blue Kingdoms: Shades & Specters, with Stephen D. Sullivan (Walkabout Publishing, 2008; ISBN 0-9802086-5-3)
  - Blue Kingdoms: Buxom Buccaneers, with Stephen D. Sullivan (Walkabout Publishing, 2008; ISBN 0-9802086-5-3)
  - Blue Kingdoms: Mages and Magic, with Stephen D. Sullivan (CreateSpace, 2010; ISBN 1-4564-8395-1)
- A Hero by Any Other Name (Silence in the Library, 2013; ISBN 098967682X)
