= Witch World =

Speculative fiction universe of Andre Norton

Witch World is a speculative fiction project of American writer Andre Norton, inaugurated by her 1963 novel Witch World and continuing more than four decades. Beginning in the mid-1980s, when she was about 75 years old, Norton recruited other writers to the project, and some books were published only after her death in 2005. The Witch World is a planet in a parallel universe where magic long ago superseded science; early in the fictional history, it is performed exclusively by women. The series began as a hybrid of science fiction and sword and sorcery, but for the most part it combines the latter with high fantasy.

Map of the Witch World by Barbi Johnson, from the 1970 ACE Witch World Gift Box Set

Witch World starts with what is now called the Estcarp cycle, describing the adventures of Simon Tregarth from Earth, his witch wife Jaelithe, and their three children Kyllan, Kemoc and Kaththea. The series was then expanded with the High Hallack cycle, starting with Year of the Unicorn in 1965 and its sequels Jargoon Pard and Gryphon in Glory. Mostly these cycles are organized by continent, with High Hallack being on one to the west of the one containing Estcarp and its neighboring countries, with a sea in between.

== Novels ==
=== Estcarp ===
Simon Tregarth

- Annals of the Witch World (omnibus; SFBC, 1994), also known as The Gates to Witch World (TOR, 2001), contains Witch World, Web of Witch World and Year of the Unicorn)
- Witch World (1963)
- Web of the Witch World (1964)

The Tregarth Children

- Chronicles of the Witch World (omnibus; SFBC, 1998), also known as Lost Lands of Witch World (TOR, 2004); contains Three Against the Witch World, Warlock of the Witch World and Sorceress of the Witch World)
- Three Against the Witch World (1965)
- Warlock of the Witch World (1967)
- Sorceress of the Witch World (1968)

Others

- Witch World: Swords and Spells (omnibus, SFBC, 1987); contains Trey of Swords, Ware Hawk and The Gate of the Cat)
- Trey of Swords (1977)
- Ware Hawk (1983)
- The Gate of the Cat (1987)
- Ciara's Song (1998) with Lyn McConchie
- The Duke's Ballad (2005) with Lyn McConchie

=== High Hallack ===
- Year of the Unicorn (1965)
- The Jargoon Pard (1974; sequel to Year of the Unicorn)
- Spell of the Witch World (1972) collection of stories
- Gryphon Trilogy

- The Crystal Gryphon (1972)
- Gryphon in Glory (1981)
- Gryphon's Eyrie (1984) with A. C. Crispin

- Zarsthor's Bane (1978)
- Horn Crown (1981)
- Songsmith (1992) with A. C. Crispin
- Silver May Tarnish (2005) with Lyn McConchie

=== The Turning ===
- Storms of Victory (omnibus; 1991, contains Port of Dead Ships by Andre Norton and Seakeep by P. M. Griffin)
- Flight of Vengeance (omnibus; 1992, contains Exile by Mary H. Schaub and Falcon Hope by P. M. Griffin)
- On Wings of Magic (omnibus; 1994, contains We the Women by Patricia Mathews and Falcon Magic by Sasha Miller)
- Secrets of the Witch World (omnibus; 2001, contains Key of the Keplian, The Magestone and The Warding of Witch World)
- The Key of the Keplian (1995) with Lyn McConchie
- The Magestone (1996) with Mary H. Schaub
- The Warding of Witch World (1996)

== Short stories ==
(Most are set in High Hallack.)

- "Ully the Piper" (1970) – collected in High Sorcery (1970)
- "Amber out of Quayth" (1972) – collected in Spell of the Witch World (1972)
- "Dragon Scale Silver" (1972) – collected in Spell of the Witch World (1972)
- "Dream Smith" (1972) – collected in Spell of the Witch World (1972)
- "Legacy from Sorn Fen" (1972) – collected in Lore of the Witch World (1980)
- "One Spell Wizard" (1972)
- "The Toads of Grimmerdale" (1973) – collected in Lore of the Witch World (1980) and Wizards' Worlds (1988)
- "Spider Silk" (1976) – collected in Lore of the Witch World (1980) and Wizards' Worlds (1988)
- "Sword of Unbelief" (1977) – collected in Lore of the Witch World (1980) and Wizards' Worlds (1988)
- "Falcon Blood" (1979) – collected in Lore of the Witch World (1980) and Wizards' Worlds (1988)
- "Sand Sister" (1979) – collected in Lore of the Witch World (1980) and Wizards' Worlds (1988)
- "Changeling" (1980) – collected in Lore of the Witch World (1980) and Wizards' Worlds (1988)
- "Were-Wrath" (1984) – published independently (1984) and collected in Wizards' Worlds (1988)
- "Of the Shaping of Ulm's Heir" (1987) – collected in Tales of the Witch World 1 (1987)

=== Collections and anthologies ===
- High Sorcery (1970) – collection (includes "Ully the Piper")
- Spell of the Witch World (1972) – collection (includes "Dragon Scale Silver", "Dream Smith", and "Amber out of Quayth")
- Lore of the Witch World (1980) – collection (includes "Spider Silk", "Sand Sister", "Falcon Blood", "Legacy from Sorn Fen", "Sword of Unbelief", "The Toads of Grimmerdale", and "Changeling")
- Tales of the Witch World (1987) – anthology edited by Norton (She also wrote an introduction and "Of the Shaping of Ulm's Heir".)
- Tales of the Witch World 2 (1988) – anthology edited by Norton (She also wrote an introduction.)
- Wizards' Worlds (1988) – collection (includes "Were-Wrath", "Falcon Blood", "The Toads of Grimmerdale", "Changeling", "Spider Silk", "Sword of Unbelief", and "Sand Sister")
- Four from the Witch World (1989) – anthology edited by Norton (She also wrote an introduction.)
- Tales of the Witch World 3 (1990) – anthology edited by Norton (She also wrote an introduction.)

== See also ==
- GURPS Witch World
