= Gerald W. Page =

American writer

- Born: August 12, 1939 (age 87); Chattanooga, Tennessee, U.S.
- Occupations: Short-story writer, editor
- Writing career
- Genres: fantasy, horror, science fiction, mystery

Gerald Wilburn Page (born August 12, 1939) is an American writer of fantasy, science fiction, mystery and horror. He was born in Chattanooga, Tennessee on August 12, 1939. He sold his first story to the magazine Analog where it was published during 1963.

Page acquired the magazine Coven 13 from Arthur H. Landis, renamed it Witchcraft And Sorcery, and became editor with Jerry Burge as art director. With that name the magazine lasted for six issues.

In 1969 he joined the editorial staff of TV Guide.

He edited DAW Books's anthology series The Year's Best Horror Stories from 1976 to 1979.

His story "Worldsong" appears in his anthology Nameless Places (Arkham House, 1975).

== Sources ==
- Page, Gerald (1975). Nameless Places. Sauk City, WI: Arkham House. pp. 278. ISBN 0-87054-073-4.
- "Dragoncon, Guests, Gerald W. Page". Archived from the original on February 2, 2007.
- "SF Timeline 1930-1940".
