= Empire (H. Beam Piper book) =

Collection of short stories by H. Beam Piper

- First edition, cover art by Michael Whelan.
- Author: H. Beam Piper (edited by John F. Carr)
- Language: English
- Genre: Science fiction
- Publisher: Ace Books
- Publication date: 1981
- Publication place: United States
- Media type: Print (paperback)
- Most of the stories take place in Piper's Terro-Human Future History.

Empire is a collection of short stories by American writer H. Beam Piper, edited by John F. Carr. The book was published in 1981 by Ace Books, and again in 1986. Most of these stories take place in his Terro-Human Future History, with the sole exception being "The Return".

== Contents ==
- Terro-Human Future History Chronology by John F. Carr. A short, 35-entry timeline of Piper’s Terro-Human Future History, covering from 1 A.E. to 2936 A.E.
- Introduction by John F. Carr.
- "The Edge of the Knife” (first appeared in Amazing Stories, May 1957)
- "A Slave is a Slave" (first appeared in Analog, April 1962)
- "Ministry of Disturbance" (first appeared in Astounding Science Fiction, December 1958)
- "The Return", written with John J. McGuire (first appeared in Astounding Science Fiction, January 1954)
- "The Keeper" (first appeared in Venture Science Fiction, July 1957)
