= The Worlds of H. Beam Piper =

1983 collection of short stories and articles by H. Beam Piper

- Cover of 1st edition
- Author: H. Beam Piper
- Language: English
- Series: Worlds of ... series
- Genre: Science fiction
- Publisher: Ace Books
- Publication date: 1983
- Publication place: United States
- Media type: Print (paperback)
- Pages: 231
- OCLC: 9160669
- Preceded by: The Worlds of Fritz Leiber

The Worlds of H. Beam Piper is a collection of science fiction novellas written by American author H. Beam Piper and edited by John F. Carr. It was first published in paperback by Ace Books in February 1983 as the eighth and last volume in its Worlds of ... series, and reprinted by the same publisher in December 1986.

== Summary ==
The book collects ten short works of fiction by the author, together with an introduction by the editor. None of these stories take place in either Piper’s Terro-Human Future History series nor in his Paratime series, except for "Genesis" which fits in with both series.

== Contents ==
- "Introduction" (John F. Carr).
- "Time and Again" (text at Project Gutenberg)
  (from Astounding Science Fiction, April 1947)
- "The Mercenaries" (text)
  (from Astounding Science Fiction, March 1950)
- "Dearest" (text)
  (from Weird Tales, March 1951)
- "Hunter Patrol" (with John J. McGuire) (text)
  (from Amazing Science Fiction, May 1959)
- "Flight From Tomorrow" (text)
  (from Future combined with Science Fiction Stories, September/October 1950)
- "Operation R.S.V.P." (text)
  (from Amazing Science Fiction, January 1951)
- "Genesis" (text)
  (from Future combined with Science Fiction Stories, September 1951)
- "The Answer" (text)
  (from Fantastic Universe Science Fiction, December 1959)
- "Crossroads of Destiny" (text)
  (from Fantastic Universe Science Fiction, July 1959)
- "Day of the Moron" (text)
  (from Astounding Science Fiction, September 1951)

== Recognition ==
The collection placed tenth in the 1984 Locus Poll Award for Best Collection.
