= Kalvan =

Kalvan may refer to:

== Geography ==
- Kalvan, Alborz, Iran
- Kalvan, Markazi, Iran
- Kalvan, West Azerbaijan, Iran
- Kalwan, city in Maharashtra, India

== Literature ==
- Kalvan series, science fiction book series, Lord Kalvan of Otherwhen being the first title

== Movies ==
- Kalavani, 2010 Indian film
- Kalavani 2, 2019 sequel to Kalavani
