= The Last Space Viking =

2011 book by John F. Carr

- 2011 edition cover
- Author: John F. Carr and Mike Robertson
- Cover artist: Alan Gutierrez
- Language: English
- Genre: Science fiction
- Publisher: Pequod Press
- Publication date: 2011
- Publication place: United States
- Media type: Print (Hardcover) and Ebook
- Pages: 294
- ISBN: 978-0-937912-12-6
- Preceded by: Space Viking

The Last Space Viking is a science fiction novel by American writers John F. Carr and Mike Robertson, a sequel to H. Beam Piper's Space Viking. It is set in Piper's Terro-Human future history.

== Plot summary ==
The Last Space Viking takes place a hundred years after Lucas Trask founded the League of Civilized Worlds. Many changes have occurred in the Old Federation and King Trask's plans for a new galaxy order are brought to a sudden halt when a new power emerges from the ashes of the Old Federation.

Space Vikings have been raiding and terrorizing the worlds of the Old Federation for hundreds of years. Great fortunes have been made and hundreds of planets conquered and despoiled. The Sword-Worlds have gone into their own decline just as the League of Civilized Worlds is faced with its greatest defeat. Soon, the first real threat to Space Viking domination must be overcome and brought to heel.

Captain David Morland of Joyeuse emerges at a time when the Old Federation is changing for the worse. All Morland wants is his own Space Viking base world to use as a place for organizing raids and trading parties into the thousands of worlds of the long-dead Federation. Generations of Space Viking marauders have taken their toll and plunder-worthy planets have declined as more and more of the Old Federation worlds have slipped into barbarism. But first, Morland has to find the right world and conquer it before he is discovered by a new power determined to end the Space Viking menace.

== Sequels ==
According to a comment on John F. Carr's Pequod Press website, additional novels in the Space Vikings series will be published:

John F. Carr is continuing Piper's Terro-Human Future starting with his new sequel to "Space Viking" ("The Last Space Viking") and has plans for more Space Viking books as well as a continuation of "Cosmic Computer."
