= When in the Course =

Short story by H. Beam Piper

"When in the Course" is a science fiction short story by American writer H. Beam Piper. It is a part of Piper's Terro-Human Future History series, and is nearly identical with his 1964 Paratime short story "Gunpowder God", which was later expanded into the novel Lord Kalvan of Otherwhen. It is most likely set in the 3rd century A.E.

According to his introduction to the story, found in the book Federation, John F. Carr states that the unpublished manuscript for When in the Course was found among the late author's papers by Ace Books. It was Mr. Carr's belief that the story was the original story, but that it was rejected by editor John W. Campbell for its apparent use of parallel evolution as a part of the plot. He further contended that it was Mr. Campbell who recommended that the story be rewritten to make it a part of the Paratime storyline.

“When in the Course” made its first appearance in the 1981 short story collection Federation. Unlike most Piper stories, the copyright for “When in the Course” has not lapsed.

== Plot summary ==
The story begins in the castle of Tarr-Hostigos, where Prince Ptosphes and his council of war are deciding on a course of action in response to King Kaiphranos’ refusal to stop a planned invasion by neighboring Princes Gormoth of Nostor and Sarrask of Sask. The council unanimously decides that the princedom of Hostigos must fight on alone, if need be.

The scene then switches to a spaceship in orbit around the planet. The ten men and five women who represent the total personnel and stockholders of Stellar Explorations, Ltd., are pleased to have found a Terra-like world, but disappointed to find that it is already apparently inhabited by an intelligent race. Terran law forbids them a title of ownership of the planet, forcing them instead to forge a treaty with a sovereign power on the world. As such, the Terrans decide to begin examining the planet's chemistry and biology for suitability for human colonization.

In the third scene, the Terrans are ready to make contact with the inhabitants of the planet, and select a relatively isolated valley that contains one castle. Setting up in a field, the spaceship is finally found by an armed Hostigi patrol, led by Princess Rylla, daughter of Prince Ptosphes, and captain-in-chief Chartiphon. The Terrans are shocked to see that the inhabitants of this world not only appear totally human, but extremely good looking humans at that. After a show of force, the two sides agree to parley, and begin the process of establishing communications.

When the Terrans are informed about the political situation in Hostigos, they sign a military alliance with the Hostigi, and begin preparing for war. The Terrans inform their hosts that the secret of making “fireseed” (gunpowder) is not complicated, and that they will help them build their own powder mills, breaking the monopoly held by the priests of the god Styphon. Terran Roger Barron decides that the key to the defense of Hostigos is to retake the previously lost castle of Tarr-Dombra, which guards the pass that connects Hostigos and Nostor. The Hostigi are shocked at the idea of taking such a well-made castle, until it is pointed out that Tarr-Dombra has never been attacked from the air.

During the course of the war, the new world receives its name, Freya, after the “Norse Venus.” In the novel Uller Uprising, Freya is mentioned as a world, “where the people were human to the last degree and the women were breathtakingly beautiful.”
