= Space Viking =

1963 novel by H. Beam Piper

- First edition
- Author: H. Beam Piper
- Language: English
- Series: The Tanith Series
- Genre: Science fiction
- Publisher: Ace Books
- Publication date: 1963
- Publication place: United States
- Media type: Print (Paperback)
- Pages: 191
- Followed by: Prince of Tanith

Space Viking is a science fiction novel by American writer H. Beam Piper, set in his Terro-Human future history. It tells the story of one man's search for his wife's murderer and its unexpected consequences. The story was originally serialized in Analog magazine (November 1962 – February 1963), then published by Ace Books in 1963.

== Background ==
Ten thousand refugees from the losing side of The Big War (The System States War of The Cosmic Computer) fled far beyond the boundaries of the Terran Federation and colonized the planet Excalibur. By the beginning of Space Viking, they had expanded to a handful of Sword Worlds (so-called because they are named after legendary swords) and had grown to a total population of three and a half billion, organized in a feudal system of kingdoms, duchies, and other small states, ruled by frequently warring noblemen. Despite their isolation and political instability, the inhabitants managed to retain a high level of technology, including space flight.

One day, a starship rediscovered the Old Federation. Civilization had collapsed, presumably due to the war; many of the planets had regressed to varying stages of semi-barbarism. Taking advantage of the situation, "Space Vikings" (reminiscent of Norse Vikings) proceeded to raid the poorly defended Federation worlds over the next three hundred years for loot.

== Plot summary ==
=== Part 1 - Gram ===
On the Sword World Gram, Lucas Trask, Baron of Traskon, is about to marry Elaine Karvall, whose father owns the Karvall steel mills. In addition to being a political alliance, it is also a love match. But Andray Dunnan, the insane nephew of Duke Angus of Wardshaven, is under the delusion that Elaine loves him and is being forced into the marriage. When she tries to correct him, his anger boils over. He crashes the wedding ceremony, kills her and seriously wounds Trask, before stealing the Duke's newly built starship, the Enterprise, and escaping.

When Trask recovers from his injuries, he pledges the Barony of Traskon to Duke Angus in return for another warship, twin to the one hijacked by Dunnan. He hires Otto Harkaman, an experienced Space Viking captain who had lost his own ship in a civil war on Durendal, to command the new vessel, which Trask christens the Nemesis. Trask sets out in search of Dunnan, though Harkaman warns him that given the vastness of the galaxy and the speed of spacecraft, his goal is nearly hopeless.

=== Part 2 - Tanith ===
They first visit Tanith, a primitive planet Duke Angus had planned to turn into a raiding and repair base. They find two run-down Space Viking ships already in possession, the Lamia and the Space Scourge. Trask decides to implement the Duke's original plan, taking in the other two crews as very junior partners. The natives begin receiving better treatment at his hands and training in the use of modern technology.

After some refitting, the Nemesis and the Space Scourge raid three planets, Khepera, Amaterasu and Beowulf. The loot Trask sends to Gram excites interest (and greed). Duke Angus uses the incentive of shares in the Tanith venture to gain supporters and assumes control of Gram. He promotes himself to king and names Trask his viceroy on Tanith with the rank of prince. Ambitious men begin emigrating to Trask's new realm.

Beowulf is the most advanced of the raided worlds, lacking only interstellar space flight. Puzzled, Trask investigates and finds out that it has no gadolinium, an essential element for hyperdrive engines, but does have plutonium. Coincidentally, Amaterasu (another world rising back up after undergoing decivilization) has sizable deposits of gadolinium, but lacks plutonium. Trask seizes the opportunity to set up profitable, peaceful trade between the three planets. In the process, he gradually gains two allies.

Meanwhile, ships that put into Tanith for trade and repairs occasionally bring news of sightings of Dunnan. From what he learns, Trask wonders if his enemy is plotting to conquer the civilized world of Marduk, a feat thought impossible — just the thing a megalomaniac like Dunnan would attempt.

He visits two Mardukan colonies, finding that Dunnan had recently attacked them. At the third, he comes upon the Enterprise and another Dunnan ship locked in combat with the Royal Mardukan Navy warship Victrix. He jumps into the fray and destroys both enemy ships, though he remains unsure if Dunnan was killed. The Victrix, under the command of Prince Simon Bentrik, is too badly damaged for hyperspace flight, so Trask takes the crew back to Marduk.

=== Part 3 - Marduk ===
Trask becomes friends with the Mardukan royal family and particularly King Mikhyl, the constitutional monarch of Marduk, but is contemptuous of their shaky democracy. It appears that a fanatical rabble-rouser named Zaspar Makann is poised to win the next election and become Chancellor, but that is not Trask's concern. He does, however, pursue a romance with Lady Valerie, a Mardukan noblewoman who is lady-in-waiting to King Mikhyl's eight-year-old granddaughter.

On Gram, King Angus has been abusing his power, straining relations with the other powerful nobles and also with Trask. Finally, Prince Trask declares Tanith's independence and renounces his fealty to Angus. Later, word reaches him that civil war has erupted on Gram. Many of Trask's followers urge him to claim the throne himself. Lucas is not interested. Gram, along with the other Sword Worlds, is in decline; Tanith is the future, the core around which civilization might possibly reform. To distract his divided subordinates, he fabricates a more immediate threat, claiming (without proof) that Andray Dunnan is responsible for the unrest on Marduk.

His big lie turns out to be the truth. Not winning a majority in the election, Makann seizes control of the government. Prince Simon Bentrik shows up on Tanith as a refugee with the royal granddaughter and the lady-in-waiting Trask fancies. Prince Simon brings two pieces of news: fighting has broken out on Marduk; and, more important, that Andray Dunnan is the power behind Makann.

Trask assembles a fleet of ships, including independent Space Viking ships, the raiders of Tanith's Navy, and loyalist Royal Mardukan Navy ships and speeds to Marduk for the final showdown. He wins a fierce space battle in orbit above Marduk and his fleet lands on the surface to take back the planet. Space Viking and loyalist ground forces root out Dunnan's followers. Some of the last holdouts surrender, handing over Andrey Dunnan in return for their lives. When the insane Dunnan raves that Elaine is waiting for him back on Gram, Trask shoots him dead in an act he sees as having no more importance than shooting a mad dog.

Prince Lucas decides to marry Lady Valerie if she will have him, and take the title of King of Tanith. He also decides to strive to form a League of Civilized Worlds out of the alliance that rescued Marduk.

== Sequels ==
During the 1980s Jerry Pournelle began work on a sequel, Return of Space Viking. The sequel was authorised by the Piper estate, but a combination of other projects and difficulties with the plot led to it being abandoned. A sequel, written by John F. Carr (who has been publishing sequels to Lord Kalvan of Otherwhen) and Mike Robertson was published in 2011. Entitled The Last Space Viking, the novel is set one hundred years after the original, in the early years of the Empire. Additionally, Carr announced he has rewritten the original sequel abandoned by Pournelle and it is currently being edited. This novel is set twenty years after the original and continues the story of Trask.

In addition, science fiction author Terry Mancour published the first sequel to Space Viking in March, 2011, on Kindle and other electronic formats. Titled Prince of Tanith, the novel takes place just two years after the end of Space Viking and introduces Princess Valerie Trask, Lucas Trask's new wife from civilized Marduk. The use of a split narrative between Lucas (who had the sole perspective in Space Viking) and Valerie is a departure from Piper's style. Of particular note in this sequel are the return of Count Garvan Spasso and a mysterious off-stage figure known only as "the Wizard" who seems to be helping the Princely Realm of Tanith for mysterious reasons of his own. Although Mancour did not receive authorization from the Piper estate to continue the story, he could do so as the work's copyright had expired.

To follow up, Mancour published a second sequel, Princess Valerie's War, in July 2011. In this sequel, Princess Valerie deals with ruling her semi-barbaric Space Viking world while her husband, Lucas Trask, has been captured by agents of Aton, a "civilized" world rule by a despotic bureaucracy and in charge of a large trading empire within the Old Federation. In addition, there seems to be some unlikely collusion on the part of Aton and some Space Viking elements.

Additional sequels to The Tanith Series include:

- The Last Space Viking (2011), written by John F. Carr and Mike Robertson - Set a hundred years after Piper's original novel and marking struggles of the last Space Vikings and the fall of Trask's empire.
- Space Viking's Throne (2012), written by Mike Robertson and John F. Carr - Direct sequel to Last Space Viking. The story continues the story of the aftermath of the conquest of the League of Civilized Worlds at the hands of the Mardukan Empire. Captain David Morland tries to establish a new Viking base, while trying elude Imperial hunters.
- Space Viking Legacy: The Tanith Gambit (2013), by Dietmar Wehr - The book is set two hundred and fifty years after Piper's novel, and tells of struggle of the Princes of Marduk and Tanith to fight off a great Space Viking horde overrunning their worlds.

== Influence ==
In the Traveller role-playing game, a region of the Traveller Universe called the Spinward Marches contains a polity called the Sword Worlds, also consisting of planets named after legendary swords.
