= Little Fuzzy =

1962 science fiction novel by H. Beam Piper

- 1962 Avon edition cover
- Author: H. Beam Piper
- Language: English
- Genre: Science fiction
- Publisher: Avon
- Publication date: 1962
- Publication place: United States
- Media type: Print (hardback & paperback)
- ISBN: 0-441-48498-0
- Followed by: Fuzzy Sapiens

Little Fuzzy is a 1962 science fiction novel by H. Beam Piper, now in public domain. It was nominated for the 1963 Hugo Award for Best Novel.

The story revolves around determining whether a small furry species discovered on the planet Zarathustra is sapient. It features a mild libertarianism that emphasizes sincerity and honesty.

== Plot summary ==
Protagonist Jack Holloway lives a solitary life mining valuable "sunstones" in the wilderness of the planet Zarathustra, managed by Victor Grego's Chartered Zarathustra Company, which built colonial outposts there and now reaps the benefits of the planet's resources. One day, Holloway meets a small golden-furred humanoid whom he names "Little Fuzzy", who soon introduces Holloway to his family. Holloway cares for the Fuzzies and spreads word of their apparently intelligent behavior. When the Company discovers that the Fuzzies' intelligence may qualify them as a sapient species, the Company moves against them, as the discovery of sapient native Zarathustrans would turn the planet into a protected aboriginal zone, install a proper government there, and deprive the Company of its complete control of the planet's resources.

Leonard Kellogg, one of Grego's staff, manages a team of scientists working to legally disprove the Fuzzies' sapience at all costs. Holloway suspects Kellogg's intentions and resists him. When Kellogg kills a Fuzzy in anger, Holloway has him charged with murder, leaving the Fuzzies' sapience to be determined in court. In the midst of the proceedings, it is proven that Fuzzies have at least the mental capacity of a ten-year-old human child and speak to each other ultrasonically. Kellogg kills himself in his cell, but the prosecution continues, and the court officially rules that the Fuzzies are sapient beings, invalidating the company's charter. Holloway and his allies are given Fuzzy-related positions in the new government.

== Sequels by Piper ==
The book was followed by a sequel, Fuzzy Sapiens (original title The Other Human Race) published in 1964, the same year that Piper died by suicide. It deals with the newly charterless Zarathustra Company and its gradual cooperation with the planet's new governor to ensure chaos does not take over the planet, while the Fuzzies attach themselves to individual human guardians including members of the Company staff. Victor Grego, one of the villains of the first book and the manager of the CZC, finds a Fuzzy in his private apartment in the Company tower, adopts him, names him Diamond, and become a firm supporter of the Fuzzies. This enables the company to cooperate with the new planetary government headed up by naturalist Ben Rainsford and work with the Native Affairs Commission headed up by Jack Holloway. It becomes clear that criminals are using the irregular status of the government and of the company to attack it and steal sunstones. With the help of the Fuzzies, the thieves are thwarted. There is also further exploration into the biology of the Fuzzies, and it is established that the Fuzzies may be in a biological dead end, doomed to extinction without aid from the humans.

In the wake of Piper's suicide, rumor spread of a lost "second sequel"; much later, Piper's lost manuscript was discovered. It was finally published in 1984 as Fuzzies and Other People. The plot involves Little Fuzzy himself beingseparated from Jack Holloway and introduces a band of Fuzzies led by Wise One to the combined society. It explores the deepening relationships between the characters already introduced in Piper's first two books, and shows how the Fuzzies fit in with the humans on Zarathustra.

== Sequels by other hands ==
During the period in which Piper's manuscript of his third "Fuzzy" novel remained lost, Ace Books commissioned its own official continuations of the series by other hands, which while presupposing the events of Piper's first two novels are unable to take into account those of the third.

In 1981, at the behest of the publisher, William Tuning produced the critically acclaimed Fuzzy Bones. Tuning's novel suggests that the remarkable affinity of all Fuzzies for the survival ration "Extraterrestrial Type Three" (a.k.a. "Extee 3", "estefee", or "hoksu-fusso", meaning "wonderful food") does not coincide with the composition of Zarathustran soil, a contradiction of Garrett's Theorem. A third significant Fuzzy character is developed called Starwatcher. Little Fuzzy, Diamond, and Starwatcher become the clear leaders in working with humans. Among other things, an alien spaceship is discovered on Beta Continent, and evidence that the Fuzzies are not in fact native to Zarathustra emerges, which raises a variety of legal and philosophical questions. Tuning introduces a number of memorable characters, including Christiana Stone, Grego's Fuzzy-Sitter-in-Chief; Reverend Thomas Aquinas Gordon, aka "The Rev;" Master Gunnery Sergeant Philip Helton, TFMC; and Liana Bell, a CZC scientist invited by the researchers of Holloway's Fuzzy Institute to join them in their research.

Ace also hired Ardath Mayhar in 1982 to write Golden Dream: A Fuzzy Odyssey, which tells the events of Little Fuzzy from the viewpoint of the Fuzzies (or Gashta, as they call themselves). Golden Dream fits with Piper's first two books and that of Tuning in terms of the general plot and relationships. Essentially, it is Little Fuzzy told from the point of view of the Fuzzies rather than that of the humans.

In a separate project, Wolfgang Diehr later wrote or co-wrote his own three sequels to the original "Fuzzy" trilogy, published by Pequod Press: Fuzzy Ergo Sum (2011), Caveat Fuzzy (2012), and Fuzzy Conundrum (2016, in collaboration with well-known Piper historian John F. Carr).

== Adaptations ==
Piper's original Little Fuzzy story was also adapted as a children's book, The Adventures of Little Fuzzy, by Benson Parker, issued by Platt & Munk in 1983.

In 2011, John Scalzi published Fuzzy Nation, which he described as a "reboot" of Piper's original.

== Characters ==
=== Humans ===
- Jack Holloway – Protagonist: Sunstone prospector who discovers the Fuzzies.
- Ben Rainsford – Xenobiologist, first scientist to meet the Fuzzies. Later appointed Planetary Governor.
- Gerd van Riebeek – Company Xenobiologist. Quits CZC to join Jack.
- Ruth Ortheris – Company psychologist and Federation spy.
- George Lunt – Constabulary lieutenant.
- Victor Grego – Chartered Zarathustra Company C.E.O.
- Juan Jimenez – Company naturalist.
- Gustavus Adolphus "Gus" Brannhard – Lawyer and hunter. Defended Jack for murder.
- Leonard Kellogg – Killed the Fuzzy known as Goldilocks. Charged with murder.
- Leslie Coombes – Chartered Zarathustra Company lawyer. Defended Kellogg.
- Ernst Mallin – Chief company psychologist.
- Frederic Pendarvis – Chief Justice of the Zarathustra Court system. Determined that Fuzzies are sapient beings.

=== Fuzzies ===
- Little Fuzzy – the first Fuzzy discovered
- Mamma Fuzzy – dominant female of Little Fuzzy's band
- Baby Fuzzy – Mamma Fuzzy's toddler
- Goldilocks – Fuzzy murdered by Leonard Kellogg
- Cinderella - one of Jack Holloway's Fuzzies
- Mike - one of Jack Holloway's Fuzzies
- Mitzy - one of Jack Holloway's Fuzzies
- Ko-Ko – so named for his almost ceremonial method of beheading zaktu
- Id – one of Ruth and Gerd van Riebeck's Fuzzies
- Syndrome – one of Ruth and Gerd van Riebeck's Fuzzies
- Complex – one of Ruth and Gerd van Riebeck's Fuzzies
- Superego – one of Ruth and Gerd van Riebeck's Fuzzies
- Diamond – Fuzzy attached to Victor Grego
- Starwatcher – leader of the Upland Fuzzies
- Wise One – leader of the band Little Fuzzy falls in with
- Allan Quartermain – one of Gus Brannhard's Fuzzies
- Natty Bumppo – one of Gus Brannhard's Fuzzies
