= The Worlds of Theodore Sturgeon =

1972 collection of short stories and articles by Theodore Sturgeon

- Cover of 1st edition
- Author: Theodore Sturgeon
- Cover artist: Davis Meltzer
- Language: English
- Series: Worlds of ... series
- Genre: Science fiction
- Publisher: Ace Books
- Publication date: 1972
- Publication place: United States
- Media type: Print (paperback)
- Pages: 286
- OCLC: 738092
- Preceded by: The Worlds of Frank Herbert
- Followed by: The Worlds of Jack Vance

The Worlds of Theodore Sturgeon is a collection of science fiction short stories by American author Theodore Sturgeon. It was first published in paperback by Ace Books in 1972 as the third volume in its Worlds of ... series, and was reprinted by the same publisher in September 1977. The book has been translated into German, Italian and French.

== Summary ==
The book consists of one essay and nine works of short fiction by the author, together with a frontispiece by artist Jack Gaughan.

== Contents ==
- "From Plynck to Planck" (essay, 1962)
- "The Skills of Xanadu" (novelette, 1956)
- "There Is No Defense" (novella, 1948)
- "The Perfect Host" (novella, 1948)
- "The Graveyard Reader" (short story, 1958)
- "The Other Man" (novella, 1956)
- "The Sky Was Full of Ships" (short story, 1947)
- "Shottle Bop" (novelette, 1941)
- "Maturity" (novella, 1947)
- "Memorial" (short story, 1946)

== Reception ==
Paul Walker in Galaxy Science Fiction writes "Sturgeon's best will leave its mark on your soul," but while noting that this collection had the author's "blessing as a survey of his work from 1946 to 1962," the reader's money "would better be spent" on such other Sturgeon collections as E Pluribus Unicorn, Caviar, Without Sorcery and More Than Human. "Everything that made Sturgeon one of the most influential sf writers of the late forties and fifties is here [yet] not one of these stories is what it could have been. ... All lack discipline--patience--that extra careful draft that would have been necessary to refine their difficult elements." Walker confesses he "found most of these stories rather boring to re-read, but not entirely. That special Sturgeon quality still exerts its power." He sees the author as "most successful when he is most mischievous, as in 'Shottle Bop,' or 'The Sky was Full of Ships' [or] 'The Perfect Host.' ... He is least successful here at his most interesting efforts, such as 'The Graveyard Reader,' ... 'The Other Man' and 'Maturity.'" Walker deems "a few antiques, such as 'Memorial' and 'The Skills of the Xanadu,' ... not worth reprinting."

The collection was also reviewed by Dave Hartwell in Locus #117, July 21, 1972.
