= Great Kings' War =

1985 novel by John F. Carr

Great King's War
- First edition
- Author: John F. Carr and Roland Green
- Cover artist: Alan Gutierrez
- Language: English
- Genre: Science fiction
- Publisher: Ace Science Fiction Books (1985); Pequod Press (2006)
- Publication date: 1985 (first edition); 2006 (revised and expanded edition)
- Publication place: United States
- Media type: Print (Paperback - 1985 , Hardcover - 2000 )
- Preceded by: Lord Kalvan of Otherwhen
- Followed by: Kalvan Kingmaker

Great Kings' War is an English language science fiction novel by John F. Carr and Roland J. Green, a sequel to H. Beam Piper's Lord Kalvan of Otherwhen. It continues the story of Corporal Calvin Morrison after he is transported to another timeline by a Paratime conveyor. The book was released in two editions, one in 1985 and the revised and expanded edition in 2000.

Having saved his new nation of Hos-Hostigos from destruction only last year, Calvin Morrison (now King Kalvan) faces the House of Styphon in a new military campaign. Kalvan once more draws upon his knowledge of his home timeline's military history to meet a greater threat.

== Plot ==
Great Kings' War begins near the end of the colder than usual "Winter of Wolves" which has followed the war between Hostigos and its neighbours and the founding of Hos-Hostigos. While Great King Kalvan of Hos-Hostigos (formerly Corporal Calvin Morrison, Pennsylvania State Police) leads wolf and bandit hunts throughout his realm, the archpriests of Styphon's House plot their next move against Kalvan. As spring arrives Kalvan learns through the work of his intelligence officers Klestreus and Skranga that, in addition to the threat from Styphon's House, he must also face the armies of King Kaiphranos of Hos-Harphax, who seeks to regain the princedoms lost to Kalvan the previous year.

To meet this two-fronted war Kalvan sends his father-in-law Ptosphes, Prince of Old Hostigos, as well as Princes Balthar of Beshta and Sarrask of Sask to meet the Holy Host of Styphon's House under Grand Master Soton in Beshta while he personally invades Hos-Harphax in the hope of capturing Harphax City and ending the reign of King Kaiphranos.

Kalvan's campaign goes very well and he decimates the Harphaxi forces in the Battle of Chothros Heights, killing Crown Prince Philesteus of Hos-Harphax. Kalvan is preparing to press his advantage when he receives news that Ptosphes has been defeated by the Holy Host at Tenabra Town because of the treachery of Balthar of Beshta.

Kalvan immediately abandons his plans and rushes to reinforce Ptosphes and defend Hostigos from the Holy Host at the climactic Battle of Phyrax a few miles from Kalvan's artillery foundry and the new University of Hostigos. With both sides taking extreme casualties during the day-long battle the forces of Hostigos manage to repel the Holy Host and send Soton back to Styphon's House disgraced in defeat. In the immediate aftermath Kalvan receives news that his wife Queen Rylla has been safely delivered of a healthy daughter, Princess Demia.

Afterward Kalvan sends Ptosphes north to fight Great King Demistophon of Hos-Agrys who has invaded Hos-Hostigos believing it to be defenceless where he defeats them in multiple small battles. Meanwhile, Kalvan invades Beshta and besieges Tarr-Beshta using siege tactics from his own timeline and executes Balthar for treason and seizes the miserly prince's massive treasury. The story ends with Kalvan happily reunited with Rylla and his new daughter for a peaceful winter while he prepares for the next year's battles.
