= Fuzzy Ergo Sum =

2011 novel by Wolfgang Diehr

- First/second edition cover
- Author: Wolfgang Diehr
- Cover artist: Alan Gutierrez
- Language: English
- Series: Fuzzy series
- Genre: Science fiction
- Publisher: Pequod Press
- Publication date: April 2011
- Publication place: United States
- Media type: Print (hardcover)
- Pages: 300
- ISBN: 978-0-937912-11-9 (1st edition) 978-0-937912-17-1 (2nd edition)
- Followed by: Caveat Fuzzy

Fuzzy Ergo Sum is a 2011 science fiction novel by Wolfgang Diehr as a sequel to H. Beam Piper's Fuzzy trilogy: Little Fuzzy, Fuzzy Sapiens, and Fuzzies and Other People. The trilogy concerns the discovery of a primitive species of small, childlike but sapient furry creatures on Zarathustra, a frontier planet with valuable mineral deposits, and the subsequent conflicts this generates between the Fuzzies, the humans who befriend them, and those who would exploit the Fuzzies and their land. Fuzzy Ergo Sum begins shortly after the conclusion of the trilogy, involving characters from those books in further adventures and conflicts. The story ends in a cliffhanger, and is concluded in Diehr's Caveat Fuzzy.

== Plot ==
Six months travel by hyperdrive from Terra is the planet Zarathustra, a world colonized by the Chartered Zarathustra Corporation (CZC) to exploit its mineral wealth, including its unique sunstone gemstones. Still in the early stages of colonization, Zarathustra was thought to be devoid of intelligent life until prospector Jack Holloway discovered a race of small furry humanoids, the Fuzzies. Subsequently, the Pendarvis Decision had declared the Fuzzies to be sapient and thus the owners of the planet's mineral rights, which cost the CZC its mining charter.

Things have been quiet on Zarathustra the last few years for the Colonial Government, Jack Holloway (now Commissioner of Native Affairs), the Fuzzies, and the (now) Charterless Zarathustra Company. Baby Fuzzy has made his first kill, the sunstone mining agreement with the CZC has kept the colonial government in the black; Fuzzies and humans have peacefully co-existed in a nearly symbiotic relationship.

Then the mysterious John Morgan from the planet Freya arrives, and starts digging through CZC files. No one knows what he is looking for or how it could affect the Company. Victor Grego, the company CEO, assigns young Akira O’Barre to keep an eye on the mysterious Mr. Morgan. What she discovers could put one of several men at risk, among them Jack Holloway and the Chief Colonial Prosecutor, Gus Brannhard. John Morgan is looking for someone, not something; someone he intends to kill.

To make matters worse, the most infamous criminal on the planet escapes from Prison House with the aid of unknown confederates, who have plans that could shake the foundations of the colonial government and the CZC.

The story ends on a cliffhanger, and is concluded in Diehr's sequel, Caveat Fuzzy.

== Second Edition Revisions ==
The first edition includes a few words of the Fuzzies' language invented by Ardath Mayhar for her own Fuzzy book, Golden Dream: A Fuzzy Odyssey. Although Diehr had obtained permission for use from Mayhar, a protest over copyright was issued by her publisher, Ace Books. In response, Diehr rewrote the relevant passages, and a second edition was issued three months after the first.

== Reviews ==
The book has received generally positive reviews from Analog, Flayrah, and Jonathan Edward Feinstein's News. Analog stated "Of all the commissioned sequels, Wolfgang Diehr’s most captures the voice of H. Beam Piper. One gets the feeling that he is a fan of Piper, and he’s also a good enough writer to pull off the right mix of homage and originality."

However, several reviewers objected to the lack of any warning on the cover that this book ends on a cliffhanger, making the story incomplete.
