= Great Science Fiction Stories About Mars =

1966 short story anthology

- Dust-jacket from the first edition
- Author: Edited by T. E. Dikty
- Language: English
- Genre: Science fiction
- Publisher: Fredrick Fell
- Publication date: 1966
- Publication place: United States
- Media type: Print (hardback)
- Pages: 187

Great Science Fiction Stories About Mars is a 1966 anthology of science fiction short stories edited by T. E. Dikty and published by Fredrick Fell. Most of the stories had originally appeared in the magazines Startling Stories, Argosy, Thrilling Wonder Stories, Amazing Stories, Super Science Stories and Astounding SF.

== Contents ==
- "The Red Planet", by T. E. Dikty
- "The Sound of Bugles", by Robert Moore Williams
- "Non-Stop to Mars", by Jack Williamson
- "The First Martian", by A. E. van Vogt
- "Via Etherline", by Eando Binder
- "Tin Lizzie", by Randall Garrett
- "Under the Sand-Seas", by Oliver E. Saari
- "Omnilingual", by H. Beam Piper

== Reception ==
Algis Budrys of Galaxy Science Fiction said that "You may be rather surprised at how much pleasure you get out of this mediocre book" and "I expect you will enjoy it too".
