= Ace Books's Worlds of ... series =

Series of short story books, under various different authors, between 1966 and 1983

The first volume, published in 1966

The Worlds of ... is a series of speculative fiction collections originally published in paperback by Ace Books from 1966 to 1983.

== History ==
The series consists of a succession of similarly-titled single-author short story collections, each gathering together representative samples of the short works of a particular author then prominent in the field. According to John ONeill, Ace editor Donald A. Wollheim "more or less pioneered the idea" of such a series, first for Ace Books with this occasional series called "The Worlds of [author's name]" (continued sporadically by other editors after he left Ace), and then for DAW Books with his "The Book of [author's name]" sequence. The concept was later taken up and taken further by Ballantine/Del Rey and Pocket Books with their respective "Best of" series, both of them more ambitious than either of Wollheim's.

== Content ==
The volumes occasionally included an or introduction by the author, editor, or other commentator. Some of the early volumes also had a frontispiece by artist Jack Gaughan, a frequent contributor of cover and interior art to other books edited or published by Donald A. Wollheim, both for Ace and DAW. Some early volumes also had a British edition issued by New English Library (in the case of the Frank Herbert volume, the NEL edition might have come first).

== The series ==
Author and publication date follow each title.

- The Worlds of Robert A. Heinlein (Robert A. Heinlein) (1966)
- The Worlds of Frank Herbert (Frank Herbert) (1971)
- The Worlds of Theodore Sturgeon (Theodore Sturgeon) (1972)
- The Worlds of Jack Vance (Jack Vance) (Dec. 1973)
- The Worlds of A. E. van Vogt (A. E. van Vogt) (Jan. 1974)
- The Worlds of Poul Anderson (Poul Anderson) (Jan. 1974)
- The Worlds of Fritz Leiber (Fritz Leiber) (Nov. 1976)
- The Worlds of H. Beam Piper (H. Beam Piper) (Feb. 1983)

== Comparable series ==
Of the similar sequences of single author series issued by other publishers, DAW Books's The Book of [author's name] series ran from 1972-1976, Ballantine/Del Rey)'s Best of [author's name] series ran from 1974 to 1988, and Pocket Books's Best of [author's name] series ran from 1976 to 1982.
