= The Worlds of A. E. van Vogt =

1974 collection of short stories and articles by A. E. van Vogt

- Cover of 1st edition
- Author: A. E. van Vogt
- Cover artist: Bart Forbes
- Language: English
- Series: Worlds of ... series
- Genre: Science fiction
- Publisher: Ace Books
- Publication date: 1974
- Publication place: United States
- Media type: Print (paperback)
- Pages: 330
- OCLC: 1942200
- Preceded by: The Worlds of Jack Vance
- Followed by: The Worlds of Poul Anderson

The Worlds of A. E. van Vogt is a collection of science fiction short stories by Canadian American author A. E. van Vogt. It was first published in paperback by Ace Books in January 1974 as the fifth volume in its Worlds of ... series, and reprinted by the same publisher in October of the same year.

== Summary ==
The book consists of fifteen works of short fiction by the author, together with an introductory essay by Forrest J. Ackerman.

== Contents ==
- "About the Author" (introduction by Forrest J. Ackerman)
- "The Replicators" (novelette, 1965)
- "The First Martian" (short story, 1951)
- "The Purpose" (novelette, 1945)
- "The Earth Killers" (novelette, 1949)
- "The Cataaaaa" (short story, 1947)
- "Automaton" (short story, 1950)
- "Itself!" (short story, 1963)
- "Process" (short story, 1950)
- "Not the First" (short story, 1941)
- "Fulfillment" (novelette, 1951)
- "Ship of Darkness" (short story, 1948)
- "The Ultra Man" (novelette, 1966)
- "The Storm" (novelette, 1943)
- "The Expendables" (novelette, 1963)
- "The Reflected Men" (novelette, 1971)

== Relation to other works ==
An earlier collection, The Far-Out Worlds of A. E. van Vogt (1968), has much the same content, but with fewer stories, omitting "The Storm" (1943), "The Expendables" (1963) and "The Reflected Men" (1971).
