= Paratime series =

Science fiction series originally by H. Beam Piper

The Paratime series written by H. Beam Piper and subsequently by John F. Carr consists of several short stories, one novella, and one novel, all but one of which were originally published in Astounding Science Fiction under the editorship of John W. Campbell. The series deals with an advanced civilization that is able to travel between parallel universes with alternate histories, and uses that ability to trade for goods and services that its own, exhausted Earth cannot provide. The protagonists of the stories are the Paratime Police, the organization that protects the secret of paratime travel.

== Stories in the Paratime series ==
These stories were written by Piper:

- "He Walked Around the Horses" (Astounding Science Fiction Magazine, April 1948)
- Police Operation (Astounding Science Fiction Magazine, July 1948)
- "Last Enemy" (Astounding Science Fiction Magazine, August, 1950)
- Temple Trouble (Astounding Science Fiction Magazine, April, 1951)
- Genesis (Future Magazine, September, 1951)
- Time Crime (novella) (Astounding Science Fiction Magazine, February and March 1955)
- Lord Kalvan of Otherwhen (novel) (Analog Science Fiction, 1965) in two parts: "Gunpowder God" and "Down Styphon!"

Sequels not written by Piper and mainly written by John F. Carr:

- Great Kings' War, written by Roland J. Green and John F. Carr.
- Kalvan Kingmaker, written by John F. Carr.
- The Siege of Tarr-Hostigos, written by John F. Carr.
- The Hos-Blethan Affair, written by John F. Carr and Wolfgang Diehr.
- The Fireseed Wars, written by John F. Carr.
- The Gunpowder God, written by John F. Carr.

Some persons dispute He Walked Around The Horses and Genesis being Paratime stories, however Genesis is the account of a group of Martian colonists arriving on Earth between 75,000 and 100,000 years ago exactly as described by Piper in several of his Paratime Police stories. All of the names used in Genesis follow the conventions used in all of the Paratime stories but not used in Piper's other stories. Additionally the events in He Walked Around The Horses are referred to by Tortha Karf in the story Police Operation where he describes the event briefly to Verkan Vall.

== Analysis ==
The Reader's Guide to Twentieth-Century Science Fiction notes that, as in most of Piper's stories, the Paratime plots nearly all "rely on the self-sufficient human. This type of person, nearly always male, uses inner strength to pull through situations that weaker persons cannot survive". The Guide notes Piper's expertise for exploring "'what if' history" the Paratime stories.

Karen Hellekson explains that "Piper divides his worlds into levels, based on their proximity and likeness to the home time line", meaning the time line of the people who know how to move between parallel worlds. She explains this as a useful technique for developing the alternative histories of the story.

Hellekson compares Paratime to Frederik Pohl's The Coming of the Quantum Cats, describing similarities in the approach to parallel timelines, as well as some meaningful differences including the fact that Pohl doesn't use the same idea of "nearness" as Piper, and that Pohl makes a heavier use of analogous characters who develop differently between timelines.

Alva Rogers says the "stories were entertaining tales not intended to be taken too seriously", noting the stories attempts to answer various "Fortean mysteries". Rogers says that Piper even got the initial idea from Charles Fort.

== The Paratime universe ==
=== Paratime Levels ===
In Piper's Paratime universe, there are an infinite number of timelines, but in each timeline, events occurred differently. They are grouped into five Levels, based on the probabilities of success of an attempt by Martians to colonize Earth 75,000 to 100,000 years ago; humans, on timelines where they are present, are the descendants of the Martian colonists. Timelines with points of divergence before the Martian colonization attempt are not discussed.

==== First Level ====
This is the level of complete success of the Martian colonization. However, in this level are several sectors of several thousand timelines each:

===== Home Timeline =====
Home Timeline, and its associated First Level Commercial, First Level Passenger, First Level Industrial Sector, First Level Service Sector, is the home of the Paratime civilization. This is the only known timeline with paratime travel capacity, and protection of the Paratime Secret is the highest priority.

Venus and Mars are also colonized by the Home Timeline (or in the case of Mars, reclaimed), and paratime transport exists there as well.

===== Dwarma Sector =====
The Dwarma sector is one where paratime travel was never discovered, and the Martian colonists settled down into a subsistence agriculture economy to survive. The culture is pacifistic and nonaggressive, though Dwarma peoples eat meat. One major event people remembered for years is when a farmer and trader contradicted themselves on the price of a pig; they raised their voices and shouted at each other. Verkan Vall and Hadron Dalla were planning a vacation in the Dwarma Sector when it was interrupted by the discovering of a paratemporal slave-trading ring in Time Crime. (In Home Timeline usage, family names precede personal names.)

===== Abzar Sector =====
The Abzar Sector is one where the survivors exhausted the resources of Earth and exterminated each other in a series of wars. Apparently the Home Timeline was only saved from a similar outcome by the discovery of paratime travel, which allowed it to exploit the resources of other timelines.

Some Abzar Sector timelines were used as a hideout of a crime organization that traded slaves across timelines.

==== Second Level ====
In the Second Level, the colony succeeded, but there were intermittent periods of Dark Ages between civilizations.

===== Akor-Neb Sector =====
The Akor-Neb civilization of Last Enemy is Second Level; its technology is almost identical to the Home Timeline except for paratemporal transposition. The culture there has legends or records of their Martian origins.

===== Jak-Hakka Sector =====
The Jak-Hakka civilization follows an ideology of "Dictatorship of the Chosen," it has been used as an example of political structures the Home Timeline wishes to avoid.

===== Khiftan Sector =====
The Khiftan sector is one whose cultures are brutal and violent. Their cities are low domes, for protection against nuclear blasts; the priesthood of Fasif punishes blasphemy with torture; and an example of Khiftan craftsmanship seen in Time Crime is a whip, the tip of which can be heated by a nuclear battery to 200 degrees Celsius. A commonly used curse by Verkan Vall is "By the Fangs of Fasif" referring to the religion common in the Kiftan Sector.

==== Third Level ====
Third Level timelines, as Piper described them, were "A few survivors—a shipload or so—were left to shift for themselves while the parent civilization on Mars died out. They lost all vestiges of their original Martian culture, even memory of their extraterrestrial origin."

===== Esaron Sector =====
Some Third Level timelines have developed space travel; the Esaron civilization developed space travel before it developed the germ theory of disease and suffered a great setback when Venusian microbial life killed off most of the population.

===== Khanga Sector =====
The Caribbean islands of this sector are overrun with pirates reported to be the best knife fighters in all of Paratime. Verkan Vall learned his knife fighting technique from them.

==== Fourth Level ====
The Fourth Level is the level of highest probability: the survivors lost all concept of their Martian origins and believe themselves to have developed on Earth.

===== Nilo-Mesopotamian =====
The Nilo-Mesopotamian cluster of sectors, including the Macedonian Empire Sector, the Alexandrian-Roman, Alexandrian-Punic, Indo-Turanian and Europo-American (which includes our own timeline), there was an Aryan invasion of Eastern Europe and Asia Minor about four thousand elapsed years ago.

===== Aryan-Transpacific =====
In the Aryan-Transpacific sector, the Aryans moved east, through Asia into North America (the Minor Land Mass); one timeline in Aryan-Transpacific is the setting of Lord Kalvan of Otherwhen. After Piper's death, three additional books have been written based in this universe.

===== Other sectors =====
The Proto Aryan Sector had the Aryan migration occur 1500 years later than in our sector, where the presence of established Sumerian and Nile civilizations inhibited their migration.

Near our timeline are timelines where there was a Second American Civil War, as well as a band where racial-based fascism rules North America as a result of a Nazi victory in 1940.

==== Fifth Level ====
The Fifth Level are those where the colonization either failed or never took place; they are empty of Martian derived human life. Piper described the Fifth level as "on some sectors Subhuman brutes...on most of it nothing even vaguely human...". Fifth level Neanderthal man exists in a Stone Age culture having evolved on Earth independently, but never advanced.

=== Travelling through timelines ===
The means of traveling through timelines is a flying saucer-shaped "conveyor" (Note: The conveyors of Lord Kalvan of Otherwhen are described as a "cross-time flying saucer") using the Ghaldron-Hesthor field generator, which was developed via a fortuitous fusion of attempts to develop faster than light space travel with ones attempting to explain certain psychic phenomena. Conveyors are fixed in place, which means that as they travel through timelines, they may end up inside nuclear reactors or other hazards or be caught in warfare (a common activity on at least one timeline in nearly every trip, Paratimers note). Weakening of the transposition field is a concern of Paratimers.

Because there are so many timelines and many conveyors, it is possible for two conveyors to "cross" each other and end up with mutually weakened fields. In this case, objects from the outside may penetrate the conveyor. Often these objects are alive. If they are people, they face two choices: be shot or have their memory obliterated. The Paratime Secret is more important than one outtimer's life. Sometimes they stumble out of the conveyor onto another timeline: this could have happened to British diplomat Benjamin Bathurst in He Walked Around the Horses (Note: This "could" is almost a certainty since the details of the story of such an occurrence that Tortha Karf tells in Police Operation match exactly the events in this story) or to the stranger on the train in Crossroads of Destiny as it did to Pennsylvania State Police officer Calvin Morrison in Lord Kalvan of Otherwhen. In those cases, the Paratime Police try to return them to their home timelines with memory obliteration. In other cases, such as a "Christian Avenger" of the Hitler-victory timeline, they decided he's better off dead and will let the locals do the job.

=== Home Timeline ===
The people of the Home Timeline, overall, believe themselves to be scientific rationalists, otherwise known as Rational Empiricists, and atheists. Their calendar numbers days of the year rather than months.

The Home Timeline's capital city apparently is Dhergabar, as is the home of many of its prominent scientific and cultural institutions. Based on clues in the stories, Dhergabar seems to be located in the general vicinity of our timeline's India - Malaysia, some three hours travel by rocket from the east coast of North America over the North Pole.

The government of the Home Timeline, the "Management", is a parliamentary system.

==== Service Sectors ====
Many of the inhabitants of the Service Sector, as well as servants and low-status workers in Home Timeline, are Fourth Level tribesmen from primitive cultures who are recruited by the tribe to work. They are not mistreated, but they do not have Citizen status, which can be granted through adoption into a Citizen family. At least two divisions of soldiers are stationed in Service Sector to deal with riots and rebellion.

=== Paratime Secret and Paratime Police ===
To supervise Paratime, the Paratime Commission exists; to enforce the Paratime Code, the Paratime Police exists.

There is only one law that is totally inviolate: no one from outside the Home Timeline civilization must ever know about paratime travel. The Paratime Transposition Code sets out legal penalties for this, as well as other crimes involving paratime, such as kidnapping and enslavement. Paratime Police officers are authorized to use extrajudicial means, such as assassination, of both Home Time residents or outtimes, to protect the secret if necessary. This action is at the agent's discretion.

Another method to protect the Paratime Secret involves spreading uncertainty and doubt about accounts of encountering paratimers. In the case of pre-scientific cultures, this is easier; actions can be explained as acts of the gods. In our timeline, in which the concept of alternate realities is common, the Paratime Police have spread stories which are implausible when investigated; however, the number of stories to investigate lessens the chance of detecting the truth.

Headquarters for the Paratime Police is at the city of Dhergabar, which is the Capital city on home Timeline. There is also a separate timeline that is exclusively for the use of the Paratime Police; they can locate conveyors wherever necessary there, or commandeer private property to locate a temporary conveyor.

In many timelines, business agents working from the Home Timeline hold a reserve commission as Paratime officers, and are expected to activate their powers when needed.

The Chief of the Paratime Police at the beginning of the series is Tortha Karf. Special Chief's Assistant Verkan Vall is the protagonist of most of the Paratime stories.

=== Characters in the Paratime series ===
All persons in the Paratime stories have names where the family name is first, somewhat similar to usage in Asiatic cultures in our timeline. For example, Verkan Vall is called Vall by his friends, Hadron Dalla is known as Dalla to her friends and so on. It is also the case that nearly all male names have a two-syllable family name and a one-syllable personal name.

==== Verkan Vall ====
Verkan Vall was born on the island of Nerros (Cuba) in the Home Timeline some time in the late 1800s; in Last Enemy, he noted he was eighty when he and Dalla Hadron were first married. He is described as having "handsome regularity of his strangely immobile features." He is a member of the nobility of the Home Timeline, able to style himself His Valor, the Mavrad of Nerros, though he does not and often forgets he has a title. (This indicates that a mavrad is approximately equivalent to a duke.)

Vall's Paratime Police position is Special Assistant to the Chief of the Paratime Police, Tortha Karff's personal roving inspector. He serves as a general troubleshooter for Chief Tortha Karf and is assigned to cases that require special attention from the Paratime Police. In Police Operation, he has to hunt down a Venusian night-hound that escaped onto our timeline; in Temple Trouble, he must rescue Home Level paratimers from torture and execution; in Last Enemy, he must locate researcher Hadron Dalla; and in Time Crime, he is in charge of an investigation to track down a large criminal organization of slave traders. At the end of Time Crime Vall is promoted to Chief of Duplicate Paratime Police, a new system set up on Police Terminal to seek out and destroy large organized crime syndicates operating across Paratime like the Organization described in Time Crime.

Vall is a crack shot with either hand (like most Paratimers, he is ambidextrous) and learned knife fighting from the Third Level Khanga pirates of the Caribbean Islands, who were reputed to be the best fighters in all paratime.

In Lord Kalvan of Otherwhen, Vall investigates the wounding of a Paratime Policeman by Calvin Morrison and determines whether or not Calvin should die or live. He decides that Morrison is no threat to the Paratime Secret, though he must have deduced it. Vall takes occasional service with the Morrison-led army of Hos-Hostigos as a colonel of scouts.

By the time of Great Kings' War, Vall has taken over as Chief of the Paratime Police, replacing the newly retired Tortha Karff.

==== Hadron Dalla ====
Hadron Dalla is a psychical researcher and has been married to Verkan Vall twice. On the home timeline, she is a member of Rhogom Memorial Foundation of Psychic Science in Dhergabar. Dalla traveled to the Akor-Neb sector to continue research, where she discovered evidence that human consciousness survives the body and reincarnation is a scientific fact; this research led to a major upset of Akor-Neb politics and societal structure, and forced Verkan Vall to retrieve her lest the Paratime Secret be disclosed (see Last Enemy).

Dalla remarries Vall. Before they can go on a vacation on the Dwarma sector, Vall is called to investigate a gang of paratime slave traders; Dalla goes along with him on the investigation. Her skills as a psychic researcher and investigator are highly valuable to the investigation, and she becomes a member of the Paratime Police.

Dalla goes with Vall to the kingdom of Hos-Hostigos in Lord Kalvan of Otherwhen, serving as a second pair of eyes and a companion to Princess Rylla, who becomes Morrison's wife. This disturbs Vall a little bit; he regards the two women as two identical sticks of dynamite, believing that whatever sort of trouble one of them didn't think of, the other would.

==== Tortha Karf ====
At the beginning of the series, Tortha Karf is a man entering middle age at 290; he is beginning to become overweight and having gray hair.

Karf comes from a family of Paratime Police; his grandfather had problems with the Spanish Inquisition on the Europo-American line. As a member of the Paratime Police, Karf inadvertently picked up Benjamin Bathurst, who was shot by local authorities before he could be recovered. See "He Walked Around The Horses" for the details of what happened to Benjamin Bathurst from the viewpoint of the inhabitants of the timeline he was transported to.

Karf owns the island Sicily, including a farm, on one Fifth Level timeline where he goes for recreation and where he plans to retire.

==== Skordran Kirv ====
Skordran Kirv discovered organized intertemporal slave trading activities while on detached duty working as a Guard Captain for Consolidated Outtime Foodstuffs Company under the cover name Kiro Soran. Originally a field agent he was working as a Guard Captain after a two-year assignment on the Fourth Level Kholghoor sector when he recognized the slaves sold to his employer as being from Kholghoor because they were speaking Kharanda, their native language. Realizing that the slaves had been imported from another time line he reported the situation and secured the scene. By the end of the story Time Crime he was promoted to Deputy Sub-Chief for the Esaron Sector and he is also mentioned in passing by Verkan Vall in Lord Kalvan of Otherwhen as being very helpful in surveillance on the Kalvan timeline and its nearest neighboring lines.

== Influence ==
Piper's suicide in 1964 prevented further works in the series from coming out after Lord Kalvan of Otherwhen. However, Ace Science Fiction republished many of his works in the later 1980s, where they influenced a new generation of readers. Roland J. Green and John F. Carr wrote a sequel to Kalvan, Great King's War. Carr also wrote Kalvan Kingmaker and Siege of Tarr-Hostigos, The Fireseed Wars and Gunpowder God, Wolfgang Diehr and John F. Carr wrote together The Hos-Blethan Affair.

Other works influenced heavily by Piper's Paratime include Harry Turtledove's Crosstime Traffic series, the G.O.D., Inc. trilogy by Jack Chalker, Michael Kurland's Perchance (first volume of the not-yet-continued Elsewhen series), Michael McCollum's A Greater Infinity, Richard C. Meredith's Timeliner Trilogy, Charlie Stross’s The Merchant Princes series, and the GURPS Infinite Worlds role-playing game setting. Andre Norton's The Crossroads of Time and its sequel Quest Crosstime may also have been influenced by Paratime; the "Wardsmen" group in both books resembles the Paratime Police in a number of ways.
