= The Worlds of Fritz Leiber =

1976 collection of short stories and articles by Fritz Leiber

- Cover of 1st edition
- Author: Fritz Leiber
- Cover artist: Patrick Woodroffe
- Language: English
- Series: Worlds of ... series
- Genre: Science fiction
- Publisher: Ace Books
- Publication date: 1976
- Publication place: United States
- Media type: Print (paperback)
- Pages: [x], 340
- OCLC: 3057365
- Preceded by: The Worlds of Poul Anderson
- Followed by: The Worlds of H. Beam Piper

The Worlds of Fritz Leiber is a collection of science fiction novellas by American author Fritz Leiber. It was first published in paperback by Ace Books in November 1976 as the seventh volume in its Worlds of ... series. The first hardcover edition was published by Gregg Press in June 1979.

== Summary ==
The book collects twenty-two short works of fiction, together with an introduction by the author. In the Gregg Press hardcover, the introduction was replaced by a new introduction by the author's son Justin Leiber.

== Contents ==
- "Introduction" (Fritz Leiber) [original edition only]
- "Introduction" (Justin Leiber) [hardcover edition only]
- "Hatchery of Dreams" (1961)
- "The Goggles of Dr. Dragonet" (1961)
- "Far Reach to Cygnus" (1965)
- "Night Passage" (1975)
- "Nice Girl with Five Husbands" (1951)
- "When the Change-Winds Blow" (1964)
- "237 Talking Statues, Etc." (1963)
- "The Improper Authorities" (1959)
- "Our Saucer Vacation" (1959)
- "Pipe Dream" (1959)
- "What's He Doing in There?" (1957)
- "Friends and Enemies" (1957)
- "The Last Letter" (1958)
- "Endfray of the Ofay" (1969)
- "Cyclops" (1965)
- "Mysterious Doings in the Metropolitan Museum" (1974)
- "The Bait" [Fafhrd and the Gray Mouser] • (1973)
- "The Lotus Eaters" (1972)
- "Waif" (1974)
- "Myths My Great-Granddaughter Taught Me" (1963)
- "Catch That Zeppelin!" (1975)
- "Last" (1957)

== Recognition ==
The collection placed third in the 1977 Locus Poll Award for Best Single Author Collection.

== Reception ==
C. Ben Ostrander in The Space Gamer No. 8 described Leiber as a "total master of the written word" and recommended that readers "[d]on't miss this book".

The collection was also reviewed by Michael Bishop in Delap's F & SF Review, April 1977.
