= Federation (short story collection) =

Collection of short stories by H. Beam Piper

- First edition cover art by Michael Whelan.
- Author: H. Beam Piper
- Language: English
- Publisher: Ace Books
- Publication date: 1981
- ISBN: 0-441-23188-8 (first edition)
- Dewey Decimal: 813.54
- LC Class: PS3566.I58 F4

Federation is a collection of short stories by American writer H. Beam Piper, edited by John F. Carr. The book was published in 1981 by Ace Books, and again in 1982, 1983 and 1986. Most of these stories take place in the early part of his Terro-Human Future History.

== Contents ==
- Essay: “Piper's Foundation” by Jerry Pournelle
- Introduction by John F. Carr.
- "Omnilingual (first appeared in Astounding Science Fiction, February 1957)
- "Naudsonce" (First appeared in Analog, January 1962)
- "Oomphel in the Sky" (first appeared in Analog, November 1960)
- "Graveyard of Dreams" (first appeared in Galaxy Science Fiction. February 1958)
- "When in the Course" (previously unpublished)

== Awards ==
- 1982 — Locus Poll Award, Best Single Author Collection
