= Kalvan series =

Series of novels by various authors

The Kalvan series is a series of science fiction novels started by H. Beam Piper and continued by his authority John F. Carr, about a Pennsylvania police officer who is transported to an alternate world. The series is part of Piper's Paratime series and features many of the characters from that series. The police officer, Calvin Morrison, is picked up by a "cross-time flying saucer" (really a Paratime conveyor) and dropped off in an alternate Pennsylvania where "Aryans" (speakers of Indo-European languages) migrated east across Asia and the Pacific Ocean and arrived in North America. This is different from the real world, where they moved west into Europe.

== Books ==
The Kalvan series consists of eight books:

	Book	Author(s)	Pages	Published	ISBN
1	Lord Kalvan of Otherwhen	H. Beam Piper		1965	
2	Great Kings' War	John F. Carr and Roland J. Green	400	1985, expanded in 2000	1213-765
3	Kalvan Kingmaker	John F. Carr	461	2000	0-937912-01-8
4	Siege of Tarr-Hostigos	John F. Carr	468	2003	0-937912-02-6
5	The Fireseed Wars	John F. Carr	534	2009	978-0-937912-05-8
6	Gunpowder God (Note: Not to be confused with the H. Beam Piper story published in the November 1964 Analog Science Fiction and Fact under the same name.)	John F. Carr	517	2011	978-0-937912-15-7
7	The Hos-Blethan Affair	John F. Carr and Wolfgang Diehr	656	2014	978-0-937912-63-8
8	Down Styphon! (Note: Not to be confused with the H. Beam Piper story published in the November 1965 Analog under the same name.)	John F. Carr	354	2016	978-0-937912-67-6

== Reception and analysis ==
The Encyclopedia of Science Fiction says of the Paratime and Kalvan series, "Lord Kalvan of Otherwhen remains the most successful and enjoyable of all these tales."

Joseph Major noted that upon the publication of Lord Kalvan of Otherwhen, "Fans were gratified to see Piper returning to his established "Paratime" series". He notes the passing of the author and the 20-year break between books, calling The Great Kings' War "the long hoped-for sequel and continuation" of the previous installment.

In a review of the later book, Siege of Tarr-Hostigos, Don D'Ammassa notes that "Carr and Green have expanded on [Piper's] original work, giving greater depth to the world and peopling it with believable, if not always likeable, characters."

Noting the prior change in authorship, of Kalvan Kingmaker, Stephen H Silver notes "Carr does an excellent job of capturing Piper's style and stories in his world." Silver notes that due to the previous installment Great Kings' War being out of print for over a decade, Carr focuses heavily on "providing some of the information readers need in order to follow the labyrinthine plots in the novel," also noting that the novel feels much like a middle book of a series. D'Ammassa says the book is "a story of intrigue and war that doesn't involve as much of the paratime police as I expected," noting the entertainment value from a science-fiction perspective.

== Plot and characters ==
=== Characters ===
==== Kalvan (Calvin Morrison) ====
Calvin Morrison is a state trooper of the Pennsylvania State Police who is accidentally picked up by a cross-time flying saucer (a Paratime conveyor) and carried to another timeline. Calvin's father was a Presbyterian minister who pressured him into joining the ministry, but his academic interests focused on history, particularly military history. At the outbreak of the Korean War, he left his studies and joined the Army, later joining the Pennsylvania State Police and rising to the rank of corporal. On May 19, 1964, Calvin was approaching a building containing a suspect when he stumbled into a "cross-time flying saucer" and was carried into another timeline. In the terminology of the First Level, Calvin was carried from the Fourth Level, Europo-American, Hispano-Columbian sub-sector to the Fourth Level, Aryan-Transpacific, Styphon's House sub-sector.

After stumbling out of the conveyor, Calvin found himself in a world that looked like the Pennsylvania that he knew, but had notable differences, particularly old-growth forest (he knew that the area was clear-cut in the past). Initially thinking that he was transported into the far future, he then realized that nearby mountains had obviously not been quarried.

Calvin eventually finds some nearby peasants who feed him, but a large raiding party attacks the settlement, with Calvin being instrumental in saving the villagers. Reinforcements later arrive, although in the confusion he is shot by a beautiful young woman leading them, although the bullet hits his police badge, saving his life (albeit with injuries). While recuperating, he gradually learns the local language and situation, learning that he is in the Princedom of Hostigos, part of the larger Great Kingdom of Hos-Harphax, which is being threatened by the neighboring princedoms of Nostor and Sask. The woman leading the reinforcements was Rylla, the daughter of Prince Ptosphes, the ruler of Hostigos. The locals, who refer to themselves as the Zarthani and do not use surnames, and pronounce "Calvin" as Kalvan, the name by which he is referred for the remainder of the series.

Kalvan learns that Hostigos has very little gunpowder (known as fireseed locally) because the princedom had been cut off from the material by the priests of Styphon, a local god that has a monopoly on the knowledge and production of fireseed. However, due to his history background, Kalvan knows the formula for creating gunpowder and demonstrates how to manufacture it for Ptosphes, Rylla, and the other local leaders, developing a recipe that proves significantly more powerful than "Styphon's Best" being sold to the other princedoms. Using this knowledge Hostigos begins manufacturing an independent, local supply of fireseed, and Kalvan is able to help the princedom push back the attacks by Nostor and Sask, eventually forming a new, independent kingdom of Hos-Hostigos.

==== Other characters ====
- Prince Ptosphes is the prince of Hostigos. Facing the impending conquest of his princedom by his neighbors, he embraces the knowledge that Kalvan brings, particularly the production of fireseed. He persuades Kalvan that the other princes would never support one of their own equals becoming king of Hos-Hostigos, and that Kalvan must become the new king. Ptosphes becomes a trusted advisor to Kalvan throughout the series.
- Rylla is the daughter of Ptosphes and future wife of Kalvan. An only child, she was trained in military tactics and led the reinforcements to ward off the attack by Nostori raiders that led to her shooting and nearly killing Kalvan.
- Prince Sarrask is the prince of Sask, a neighboring princedoms that, along with Nostor, are threatening Hostigos on the eve of Kalvan's arrival. Following his defeat at the end of Lord Kalvan of Otherwhen, he joins the new kingdom of Hos-Hostigos and later becomes a stalwart supporter of Kalvan.
- Verkan Vall is a Paratime Police officer who leads the investigation into Kalvan's unintentional transportation across timelines. Although he is able to determine that Kalvan certainly has deduced what happened to him, he also finds that Kalvan has developed a cover story for his arrival and deduces that he is unlikely to reveal the Paratime secret to anyone else.

=== Races and cultures ===
==== Zarthani ====
The Zarthani are a group of Indo-European descendants who speak a language which belongs to a branch of Indo-European unattested in our timeline, but which has some superficial resemblances to ancient Greek in sounds and word-endings (but not in grammar). The words for "father" and "mother" in Zarthani are phadros and mavra (from Proto-Indo-European *ph₂tḗr and *méh₂tēr). The Zarthani are the inhabitants of the five Great Kingdoms.

==== Urgothi ====
The Urgothi are a race of proto-Germans. A thousand years after the arrival of the Ros-Zarthani, the Urgothi arrived from the Cold Lands. They found the coastal areas settled by the Ros-Zarthani and so they moved east and south into the Sea of Grass (the Great Plains) and near the Great River (the Mississippi River).

The Urgothi created the Middle Kingdoms, including Grefftscharr.

==== Ruthani ====
The Ruthani are the real world Native Americans. They are considered barbarians by the Zarthani, who virtually exterminated the Eastern Ruthani when they arrived in the area to become the Great Kingdoms.

=== Great Kingdoms ===
The North American Atlantic coast is the location of the Great Kingdoms. These kingdoms are inhabited by the Zarthani and are the main location of the series. Originally there were five Great Kingdoms (Hos-Zygros, Hos-Agrys, Hos-Harphax, Hos-Ktemnos, and Hos-Bletha), but at the end of Lord Kalvan of Otherwhen, the new Great Kingdom of Hos-Hostigos is formed. Part way through the series, Kalvan also recognizes a seventh Great Kingdom, Hos-Rathon. Neither Hos-Hostigos nor Hos-Rathon are recognized by any of the other Great Kingdoms.

Another Zarthani political entity outside the framework of the Great Kingdoms is Trygath, in the Ohio valley. The Ohio River was not along the Zarthani eastwards migration routes, and Trygath is a semi-barbarous area known for its horse-breeding, and not considered Hos or "Great".

Symbols described in Lord Kalvan of Otherwhen, including the flag of newly established Hos-Hostigos (middle), and the flag of the principality of Hostigos (bottom)

==== Hos-Hostigos ====
Hos-Hostigos was formed by Kalvan from the former Harphaxi princedoms of Hostigos (also known as Old Hostigos), Nostor, Sask, Beshta, Nyklos, and Ulthor, along with a new princedom of Sashta. Due to the unilateral nature of the kingdom's establishment, it is not recognized as a Great Kingdom by any other kingdoms. Kalvan began a rapid modernization plan of the kingdom's armies (including attempting to replace pikemen with musketeers), as well as infrastructure improvements such as the Great Kings' Highway, a two-lane stone road running through the kingdom.

The flag of Hos-Hostigos is decreed to be a red keystone (the symbol of Calvin Morrison's native Pennsylvania) on a dark green field.

===== Hostigos =====
The princedom of Hostigos, also known as Old Hostigos, is the first princedom of the kingdom of Hos-Hostigos founded by Kalvan. At the time of Kalvan's arrival, Hostigos consisted of all of Centre County, southern Clinton County, and Lycoming County, Pennsylvania south of Bald Eagle Mountain and was ruled by Prince Ptosphes. Its flag is a blue halberd-head on a red field. After Kalvan married Ptosphes' daughter Rylla, Kalvan became heir to Old Hostigos.

Hostigos' capital (and the capital of Hos-Hostigos) is Hostigos Town (soon to become Hostigos City, built on the site of real-world Bellefonte, Pennsylvania). Notable castles include Tarr-Hostigos, the home of Prince Ptosphes, which defends Hostigos Town.

===== Sask =====
Sask, consisting of Blair and parts of Clearfield, Huntingdon, and Bedford Counties in Pennsylvania, is one of Old Hostigos' former enemies ruled by the gluttonous Prince Sarrask. After the extremely bloody Battle of Fyk and the capture of Sarrask, Sask becomes an important tool in Kalvan's war against Styphon's House. Sask's capital is Sask Town (on the site of real-world Hollidaysburg, Pennsylvania), and its flag is a golden-rayed sun on a green field.

===== Nostor =====
To the north-east of Hostigos, Nostor — consisting of Tioga and parts of Northumberland, Lycoming, and Montour counties to the forks of the Susquehanna — is another one of Old Hostigos' former enemies. At the time of Kalvan's arrival, Nostor was ruled by the cruel Prince Gormoth and was to be the main arm of the Styphon's House attack on Hostigos. The reformed Hostigi forces under Kalvan's guidance defeated the Nostori army and invaded the princedom, leading to a brief civil war within Nostor. The new prince, Prince Pheblon, agrees to join Hos-Hostigos. Nostor's capital is Nostor Town (near real-world Hughesville, Pennsylvania), and its flag is an orange lily on a black field.

===== Other princedoms =====
Beshta is located in the Besh (Juniata) River Valley, south-east of Old Hostigos and was ruled by Prince Baltar when Kalvan arrived in Hostigos. Its colors are black and pale yellow.

The princedom of Sashta was created out of eastern Sask, western Beshta, and southern Hostigos by order of King Kalvan as a means of keeping Balthar's brother, Balthames from causing any trouble or from wielding any real power.

Nyklos is located north-west of Old Hostigos and consists of Potter and McKean County, Pennsylvania. Nyklos is ruled by Prince Armanes and a truly voluntarily princedom of the new kingdom of Hos-Hostigos.

Ulthor is a voluntary princedom of Hos-Hostigos and is located in the north-western corner of Hos-Hostigos and contains the only port in the kingdom (real world Erie).

==== Hos-Harphax ====
Hos-Harphax is the original Great Kingdom of the princedoms that joined to form Hos-Hostigos. Hos-Harphax is one of the older Great Kingdoms and was created when the trading city of Harphax City at the mouth of the Susquehanna River began to exert its influence on the other cities, towns, and villages upstream from Harphax City. At the beginning of the Kalvan series, Hos-Harphax includes the territory of real-world Pennsylvania, Maryland, Delaware, and southern New Jersey, and is ruled by Great King Kaiphranos, who dies in Kalvan Kingmaker.

==== Other kingdoms ====
Hos-Ktemnos has one of the best militaries in the Great Kingdoms, consisting of the Sacred Squares. Hos-Ktemnos is located in Virginia, North Carolina and South Carolina and is the site of the city of Balph, the headquarters of Styphon's House.

Hos-Bletha is the southernmost Great Kingdom (consisting of real world Florida and Georgia) and was originally a part of Hos-Ktemnos.

Hos-Agrys is based in New York state, northern New Jersey, and southwestern Quebec, with its capital at Agrys City (Manhattan Island).

Hos-Zygros includes New England, most of Quebec, and part of eastern Ontario. The capital, Zygros City, is on the site of the real-world city of Quebec.

=== Middle Kingdoms ===
The Middle Kingdoms are located in central North America. They include Grefftscharr, a major trading city, Rathon, and Dorg. Rathon was later recognized by Great King Kalvan as the seventh Great Kingdom of Hos-Rathon.

==== Grefftscharr ====
Grefftscharr is a Kingdom centered around a major trading city in the location of our Chicago and strongest of the Middle Kingdoms. In the Kalvan series, Paratime Police Chief Verkan Vall establishes a cover of being from Grefftscharr when he helps Kalvan. Grefftscharr covers the area of Illinois, Wisconsin, Michigan, Indiana, Western Ohio and Southern Ontario around the Great Lakes.

=== Styphon's House ===
Styphon's House is the temple of the god Styphon, originally a minor healer god, but who rose to prominence when his priests gained a monopoly control on the manufacture of gunpowder, and began to actively intervene in politics and finance. The main temple of Styphon's House is in the city of Balph, located in the Great Kingdom of Hos-Ktemnos.

==== Holy Order of the Zarthani Knights ====
The Holy Order of the Zarthani Knights is one of the two military arms of Styphon's House. The Knights defend the Great Kingdoms of Hos-Ktemnos and Hos-Bletha from the barbarians of the Sastragath. The Knights are similar to the real world's crusading orders.

The Knights are divided up into Lances, which are then combined into Wedges.

==== Styphon's Own Guard ====
Styphon's Own Guard is the other military branch of Styphon's House. The soldiers in this military wear red armor and have been known to kill friendly soldiers who try to flee the battlefield.

=== The Great Kings' War ===
The Great Kings' War is the war between Great King Kalvan and Styphon's House. The war also involves the pro-Styphon Great Kingdoms of Hos-Harphax and Hos-Ktemnos and the Pro-Kalvan/Anti-Styphon forces of Hos-Rathon and the Urgothi "barbarians" led by Warlord Ranjar Sargos. The war is to some extent a continuation of the Hostigos War of Unification (shown in Lord Kalvan of Otherwhen). The war begins in the book Great Kings' War.

==== Battles and Campaigns ====
===== Great Kings' War =====
- The Battle of Chothros Heights (Kalvan victory) -- The battle where Kalvan utterly defeated the Harphaxi Royal Army and destroyed three lances of Zarthani Knights.
- The Battle of Tenebra (Styphon's House victory) -- The battle where the Styphoni (led by Grand Master Soton), defeated the Hostigi army led by Prince Ptosphes because of the treachery of Balthar of Beshta
- The Battle of Phyrax (Kalvan victory) -- The extremely bloody battle in which Kalvan repulsed the Styphoni Holy Host from Hostigos after the Battle of Tenebra.

== See also ==
- Lord Kalvan of Otherwhen
- Great Kings' War
- Kalvan Kingmaker
- Siege at Tarr-Hostigos
