= Omnilingual =

Short story by H. Beam Piper

"Omnilingual" was the cover story on the February 1957 Astounding Stories, illustrated by Frank Kelly Freas.

"Omnilingual" is a science fiction short story by American writer H. Beam Piper. Originally published in the February 1957 issue of Astounding Science Fiction, it focuses on the problem of archaeology on an alien culture.

== Synopsis ==
An expedition from Earth to Mars discovers a deserted city, the remains of an advanced civilization that died out 50,000 years before. The human scientists recover books and documents left behind, and are puzzled by their contents. Earnest young archeologist Martha Dane deciphers a few words, but the real breakthrough comes when the team explores what appears to have been a university in which the last few civilized Martians made their last stand. Inside, they find a "Rosetta Stone": the periodic table of the elements. The story builds tension from the skepticism of the rest of the team, mostly male, as well as from Dr. Dane's competitive, spotlight-seeking teammate, Tony Lattimer.

== Reception ==
Jo Walton stated that Omnilingual was "influential" and "the classic SF short story, the one everyone ought to read if they’re only going to read one", and noted that the story "raises a question that everyone who has dealt with the subject [when writing science fiction] since has had to either accept or find a way around", namely "If scientific truths are true for everyone, will we therefore be able to communicate with all scientifically literate cultures using science?" Walton also commended the story's use of gender equality and multicultural characters, with "the only thing that made [her] raise [her] eyebrows" being the constant use of alcohol and tobacco.

James Nicoll questioned the basic premise of scientific language being necessarily decipherable — "what if Martian didn't use letters and a numbering system which sounds very akin to ours?" — but overall concluded that the story was "well worth reading." The Routledge Companion to Science Fiction similarly faulted this "ideological sleight-of-hand", emphasizing that the "extinct Martian civilization closely resembles the [then-]contemporary US: language is recorded in a linear written form divided into words; the title pages of printed magazines feature the title, month of publication, issue number, and table of contents; Martians live in cities with universities; universities are divided into disciplinary departments — and classrooms — more or less identical to terrestrial ones; and on the wall of the material sciences lab hangs a periodic table of elements, organizing information which might apply universally but which in no way demands graphic representation or public display."

John W. Cowan, inventor of Lojban, praised Omnilingual as "one of the best science fiction stories in which the science is linguistic archaeology", and published a modernized version to his website in 2009.

== Stylometric study ==
In 2018, Tomi S. Melka and Michal Místecký carried out a complex quantitative analysis of the novelette's style.

== Publication history ==
Omnilingual has been reprinted several times since its original publication.

- Prologue to Analog (1962, Doubleday)
- Analog Anthology (1965, Dobson)
- Great Science Fiction Stories About Mars (1966, Fredrick Fell)
- Apeman, Spaceman (1968, Doubleday)
- Mars, We Love You (1971, Doubleday) - Also published under the title The Book of Mars
- Where Do We Go from Here? (1971, Doubleday)
- The Days After Tomorrow (1971, Little Brown)
- Tomorrow, and Tomorrow, and Tomorrow... (1974, Rinehart & Winston)
- Science Fiction Novellas (1975, Scribner)
- Federation (1981, Ace)
- Isaac Asimov Presents The Great SF Stories 19 (1957) (1989, DAW)
- The World Turned Upside Down (2005, Baen)

== See also ==
- Michael Moorcock
- Isaac Asimov
- A. E. van Vogt
- Robert Silverberg
- Xenoarchaeology
- Xenolinguistics
