= William Tuning =

American novelist

Orville William Tuning (June 21, 1935 in Ottumwa, Iowa – April 18, 1982 in Santa Barbara, California) was an American author of science fiction and a member of the Society for Creative Anachronism (SCA). He was reported to be close friends with authors Jerry Pournelle, Randall Garrett (SCA name: Randall of Hightower) and Robert A. Heinlein. Tuning was closely involved with the founders of the SCA.

Among his works were the 1981 Fuzzy Bones, a posthumous sequel to H. Beam Piper's Little Fuzzy and Fuzzy Sapiens (written and published before the discovery and subsequent publication of the lost manuscript of Piper's Fuzzies and Other People), and the 1978 "Tornado Alley".

Tuning died in 1982, of "blood disease contracted during a hospital stay for the treatment of alcoholism".
