= The Worlds of Jack Vance =

1973 collection of short stories and articles by Jack Vance

- Cover of 1st edition
- Author: Jack Vance
- Language: English
- Series: Worlds of ... series
- Genre: Science fiction
- Publisher: Ace Books
- Publication date: 1973
- Publication place: United States
- Media type: Print (paperback)
- Pages: 302
- OCLC: 738092
- Preceded by: The Worlds of Theodore Sturgeon
- Followed by: The Worlds of A. E. van Vogt

The Worlds of Jack Vance is a collection of science fiction short stories by American author Jack Vance. It was first published in paperback by Ace Books in December 1973 as the fourth volume in its Worlds of ... series. The book has been translated into German.

== Summary ==
The book consists of nine works of short fiction by the author.

== Contents ==
- "The World Between" (novelette, 1953)
- "The Moon Moth" (novelette, 1961)
- "Brain of the Galaxy" (novelette, 1951)
- "The Devil on Salvation Bluff" (short story, 1955)
- "The Men Return" (short story, 1957)
- "The Kokod Warriors" (novelette, 1952)
- "The King of Thieves" (short story, 1949)
- "Coup de Grace" (short story, 1958)
- "The Brains of Earth" (novella, 1966)
