= The Worlds of Poul Anderson =

1974 collection of short stories and articles by Poul Anderson

- Cover of 1st edition
- Author: Poul Anderson
- Cover artist: Joseph Lombardero
- Language: English
- Series: Worlds of ... series
- Genre: Science fiction
- Publisher: Ace Books
- Publication date: 1974
- Publication place: United States
- Media type: Print (paperback)
- Pages: 330 (105, 108, 125)
- OCLC: 472707995
- Preceded by: The Worlds of A. E. van Vogt
- Followed by: The Worlds of Fritz Leiber

The Worlds of Poul Anderson is an omnibus collection of science fiction novellas by American author Poul Anderson. It was first published in paperback by Ace Books in January 1974 as the sixth volume in its Worlds of ... series, and afterwards reprinted by the same publisher.

== Summary ==
The book collects three novellas or short novels by the author, each with its own pagination.

== Contents ==
- "War of Two Worlds" (1959)
- "Planet of No Return" (1956)
- "World Without Stars" (1967)

== Reception ==
The collection was reviewed by Gail C. Futoran in Luna Monthly #60, December 1975.
