= Shottle Bop =

1941 short story by Theodore Sturgeon

"Shottle Bop" is a fantasy short story by American writer Theodore Sturgeon, first published in 1941 in the magazine Unknown. Avram Davidson said that it is the source of all "odde shoppe" stories; and even if not that, of many.

The protagonist discovers a mysterious shop – "The Shottle Bop", between Twentieth and Twenty-first Streets, on Tenth Avenue in New York City – which has bottles containing all manner of strange things. The proprietor dislikes his pompous attitude, paralyzes him by spraying him with the essential oil from the hair of a Gorgon's head, and only releases him after extracting a grudging apology. The proprietor then mixes up a strange potion, saying it will, when drunk, "cure" him and give him a "talent".

The protagonist returns home and, after initial reluctance, drinks the potion. He discovers that he can now see and talk with ghosts; although they cannot see him. When he goes back to look for the shop, it is not there. He sets himself up as a psychic investigator: a business at which he is highly successful, with the aid of unseen disembodied assistants.

He taunts some of his low-life former associates with his success. They round on him, but he persuades one of them to spend the night in a haunted house, for a bet. That night, the effects of the potion wear off.
