= The Return (Piper and McGuire short story) =

- Short story by H. Beam Piper; John J. McGuire
- Country: United States
- Language: English
- Genre: Science fiction

Publication
- Published in: Astounding Science Fiction
- Publication date: January 1954

"The Return" is a science fiction short story by American writers H. Beam Piper and John J. McGuire. It is not a part of either Piper's Terro-Human Future History series or his Paratime series.

It made its first appearance in the January 1954 issue of Astounding Science Fiction. The story was later edited and expanded for its appearance in the 1960 book The Science Fictional Sherlock Holmes. The differences between the two editions of the story are minor, mostly taking the form of added dialogue.

== Synopsis ==
It has been more than 250 years since the nuclear war devastated the world, and finally the people of Fort Ridgeway (in what had once been Arizona) are advanced enough to go out looking for other surviving communities. The helicopter-borne explorers, Dr. Jim Loudons and Monty Altamont, are on their way to Pittsburgh to dig up an old cache of microfilmed books that was buried at the Carnegie Library before the war. Having so far only encountered stone-age barbarians, they are surprised to find a fort, defended by people with organization, firearms, and literacy.

The people living in the fort are descendants of an old pre-war army platoon, and they have maintained their organization and civilization as much as is possible. Also, they seem to have developed a strange religion around a god who died in battle with his adversary, both of whom were later resurrected. The adversary is behind the primitives who periodically attack the people of the “Toon,” and the Toon waits for their god to come back to them. In the meantime, it is up to them to follow his teachings of deductive reading and keen observation.

Having secured the Toon's promise to assist them in retrieving the microfilm, Loudons and Altamont realize that they are being judged by the Toon. They seem to think that Monty Altamont is either their long-awaited god, or perhaps his adversary. The fate of their mission, not to mention their very lives might just depend on what the Toon decides.

Loudons and Altamont and eight members of the Toon set out for Pittsburgh aboard their helicopter. After locating the library's storage crypt, Dr. Loudons returns to the fort in the helicopter to get more workers, while Altamont and the eight Toon members stay behind. The local primitives, called Scowrers, launch an attack, appearing in larger numbers than the Toon has ever seen before. The realization that the adversary wants desperately to destroy the little band convinces the Toon members who Monty Altamont really is.

Having collected the microfilm and set off for Fort Ridgeway, Loudons tells Altamont that he has seen the sacred books of the Toon, and he is now very worried. Just what will happen to the Toon when they realize that they are mistaken, and that Loudons and Altamont are not really Dr. Watson and Sherlock Holmes?
