= Lord Kalvan of Otherwhen =

1965 novel by H. Beam Piper

- First edition
- Author: H. Beam Piper
- Cover artist: Jack Gaughan
- Language: English
- Genre: Science fiction
- Publisher: Ace Books
- Publication date: 1965
- Publication place: United States
- Media type: Print (Paperback)
- OCLC: 16393576
- Followed by: Great Kings' War

Lord Kalvan of Otherwhen is a 1965 science fiction novel by American writer H. Beam Piper; it is part of his Paratime series of stories, and was expanded by John F. Carr to form the Kalvan series (with some installments co-written by Carr and other writers). It recounts the adventures of a Pennsylvania state trooper who is accidentally transported to a more backward parallel universe. It was published posthumously, making it Piper's final science fiction novel.

The book is an expanded version of the novelettes "Gunpowder God", which had been published in the November 1964 issue of Analog Science Fiction and Fact, and "Down Styphon!", which had been published in the November 1965 issue of Analog. "Gunpowder God" itself is a Paratime-series rewrite of the unpublished story "When in the Course", which takes place in the Terro-Human Future History milieu.

A sequel, Great Kings' War, was written by Roland Green and John F. Carr. Carr further continued the storyline with the novels Kalvan Kingmaker, Siege of Tarr-Hostigos, The Fireseed Wars and the forthcoming The Gunpowder God (which shares the same title as the original novelette).

== Plot summary ==
Humans on an advanced time-line have discovered "lateral" time dimensions that allow them to travel to "worlds of alternate probability". They use it to exploit natural resources from these alternate realities. The Paratime Police are tasked to keep the invention of lateral "time travel" secret and to combat abuses. Occasionally, objects or people get caught in the paratime "conveyors" and are inadvertently transported to alternate timelines.

Corporal Calvin Morrison of the Pennsylvania State Police suffers just that fate. He meets some friendly peasants who speak an unknown language. When they are attacked by a raiding party armed with flintlock pistols, Morrison fights them off with his .38 revolver. Reinforcements arrive, but in the confusion, he is wounded by the beautiful young woman leading them. While recuperating, he learns the local language.

This alternate North America is split up into a number of kingdoms, each composed of small principalities, with a level of technology roughly equivalent to that of the late European Renaissance. Morrison finds himself the guest of Prince Ptosphes of Hostigos — whose daughter Rylla shot him by mistake. (He and Rylla fall in love.) He learns that the principality is being threatened by two neighbors, Nostor and Sask, with a third, Beshta, hungrily looking on. Ptosphes' overlord, Great King Kaiphranos of Hos-Harphax, refuses to intervene because the priests of the god Styphon want Hostigos to be destroyed. The religious sect uses its monopoly on black gunpowder, known as "fireseed", to control the various princes and kings. Hostigos has a sulfur spring; since sulfur is a key ingredient of fireseed, Styphon's House wants the spring.

Symbols described in the book: top, emblem of high god Dralm; middle, flag of newly established Hos-Hostigos; bottom, flag of Hostigos

Morrison (or Lord Kalvan, as the people call him) uses his knowledge of chemistry to begin producing gunpowder in quantity. He also introduces the rapier and improved cannons with trunnions and rifling. With his understanding of military strategy and tactics, he reorganizes the outnumbered Hostigos army and repulses Nostor, capturing an important border town in the process. Then, to undermine Styphon's priesthood, he sees to it that the knowledge of gunpowder manufacturing is spread far and wide.

Meanwhile, Verkan Vall, a top agent of the Paratime Police, tracks Kalvan down and infiltrates his army. The standard procedure is to "remove" the displaced person to protect the Paratime secret. However, Vall takes a liking to Kalvan and realizes that his brother policeman has fabricated a background for himself, one that motivates him to conceal the Paratime secret. To help persuade his superiors to leave Morrison alone, Vall recruits historians on the home timeline. They can use Kalvan to do an experiment testing the Great man theory — can an extraordinary individual change the course of history?

After the defeat of Nostor, Sask and Beshta become allies, forcing Kalvan to attack before their armies can unite. After a day of confused fighting against the larger Saskan forces, he emerges victorious. Sarrask of Sask is captured and agrees to become a vassal of a new Great King after he learns that he can share in the looting of Styphon's lavish temples. At first, Kalvan proposes that his future father-in-law assume the new throne, but Ptosphes refuses, stating that the other princes would never stand for being ruled by someone they view as an equal. Kalvan, as an outsider, is the only one they would accept. Plus, his cover story — that he was sent by the gods from a far-away land — plays into local legends. Thus, Lord Kalvan becomes Great King Kalvan of Hos-Hostigos, with Rylla as his queen.

When Gormoth of Nostor hears of Kalvan's successes, he turns against Styphon's House himself. This leads to a bloody civil war in Nostor, followed by Gormoth's assassination. His replacement, facing implacable opposition from Styphon's House, soon acknowledges Kalvan's sovereignty. Balthar of Beshta at first declines to become subject to Kalvan, until he discovers there are no gunpowder mills in his realm. Other neighboring princes soon side with Kalvan, as this gets rid of the usurious taxes and loans levied by Styphon's House. King Kaiphranos is infuriated by the defections, as is the Archpriest of Styphon.

== Characters ==
- Great King Kalvan
- Queen Rylla
- Prince Ptosphes of Hostigos
- Prince Sarrask of Sask
- Prince Balthames of Sashta
- Prince Balthar of Beshta
- Prince Gormoth of Nostor
- Highpriest Xentos
- Alkides
- Great King Kaiphranos
