= Kalvan, West Azerbaijan =

Kalvan كلوان
- Village
- Location within Iran
- Coordinates: 37°44′46″N 45°06′22″E
- Country: Iran
- Province: West Azerbaijan
- County: Urmia
- Bakhsh: Nazlu
- Rural District: Nazlu-e Shomali

Population (2006)
  - Total: 43
- Time zone: UTC+3:30 (IRST)
  - Summer (DST): UTC+4:30 (IRDT)

Kalvan (Persian: كلوان, also Romanized as Kalvān) is a village in Nazlu-e Shomali Rural District, Nazlu District, Urmia County, West Azerbaijan Province, Iran. At the 2006 census, its population was 43, in 11 families.
