= The Answer (short story) =

Science fiction short story

- Short story by H. Beam Piper
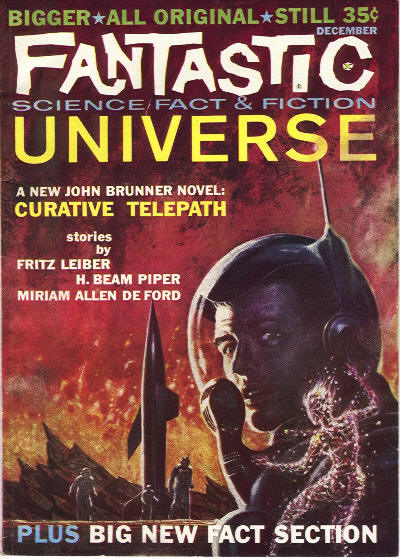
- "The Answer" was originally published in the December 1959 issue of Fantastic Universe.
- Genre: Science fiction

Publication
- Published in: Fantastic Universe
- Publication date: December 1959

"The Answer" is a science fiction short story by American writer H. Beam Piper. It is not a part of either Piper's Terro-Human Future History series nor his Paratime series.

It made its first appearance in the December 1959 issue of Fantastic Universe Science Fiction.

== Synopsis ==
It is 1984, fifteen years since the nuclear war between the United States and the Soviet Union devastated the entire Northern Hemisphere of the planet Earth, nuclear scientists Professor Doctor Lee Richardson and Comrade Professor Alexis Petrovitch Pitov are working together on a project in Argentina. During their research, they have created fifteen kilograms of negamatter iron, and they are going to drop it from space to see what happens.

The resulting explosion has a very distinctive signature, and Dr. Richardson realizes that that signature is the same as the one that occurred at Auburn, New York. The American government had assumed that the explosion was the result of a premeditated attack by the Soviets, and had retaliated, resulting in a general exchange of nuclear weapons. During the course of analyzing the Argentinean explosion Dr. Richardson realizes that the “Auburn Bomb” was not a bomb after all, but a negamatter meteor.
