= John J. McGuire =

American novelist

- Born: John Joseph McGuire; August 25, 1917; Altoona, Pennsylvania
- Died: August 1, 1981 (aged 63); United States
- Occupation: Author
- Writing career
- Genre: Science fiction

John Joseph McGuire (August 25, 1917, in Altoona, Pennsylvania – August 1, 1981) was an American author of science fiction.

He frequently wrote with H. Beam Piper.

== Selected works ==
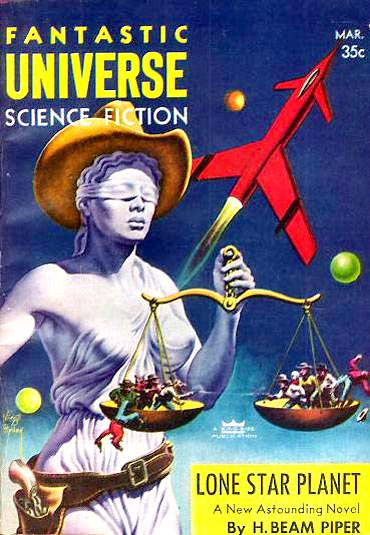
Lone Star Planet was originally published in the March 1957 issue of Fantastic Universe

=== Short stories ===
- "Hunter Patrol" (Amazing May 1959)
- "The Return" (Astounding January 1954) Note: an expanded version of this story can be found in "The Science Fictional Sherlock Holmes" (Council of Four, 1960)
- "The Queen's Messenger" (Astounding May 1957)
- "Trap for the Bleeder" (Fantastic Universe March 1959)
- "To Catch an Alien" in Star Science Fiction #6 (Ballantine Books 1959)
- "Take The Reason Prisoner" (Analog November 1963)
- "Testing" (Fantastic Stories June 1964)

=== Novels ===
- Null-ABC (Astounding February and March 1953) Note: also published as "Crisis in 2140" (Ace 1957)
- Lone Star Planet (Fantastic Universe March 1957) Note: also published as "A Planet for Texans" (Ace 1958)
