= Ardath Mayhar =

American novelist

- Born: Ardath Frances Hurst; February 20, 1930; Timpson, Texas, U.S.
- Died: February 1, 2012 (aged 81); Nacogdoches, Texas, U.S.
- Occupation: Writer
- Writing career
- Pen name: Frank Cannon; Frances Hurst; John Killdeer
- Genre: Science fiction

Ardath Frances Hurst Mayhar (February 20, 1930 – February 1, 2012) was an American writer and poet. Mayhar wrote over 60 books ranging from science fiction to horror to young adult to historical to westerns. Some of her novels appeared under pseudonyms such as Frank Cannon, Frances Hurst, and John Killdeer. Mayhar began writing fantasy with a story in 1973, and fantasy novels in 1979 after returning with her family to Texas from Oregon.

Mayhar also wrote Through a Stone Wall: Lessons from Thirty Years of Writing.

== Personal life ==
Mayhar was born at Timpson, Texas, and was first inspired to write by finding Arthur Merritt's fantasy The Face in the Abyss (1931) on a remote rural news-stand at age 15. Mayhar wrote in 1985:

"I have spent most of my adult life shovelling manure, writing poetry, and looking up at the stars. ... hand-to-hand (sometimes face-to-hoof) with the cows, the cruddy milking machines, the manure, the hay, the weather. ... At the age of forty-three, I ‘reformed’ ... I finally realized that English teachers have destroyed any love of poetry that might remain in the English-speaking race ... so I started writing fantasy novels, and haven’t looked back in the years since. I have been influenced, to a greater or lesser extent, by Charles Dickens, Shakespeare, Ayn Rand, Andre Norton, William Faulkner, and all the 'old heads' in the science fiction field."

Mayhar left the dairy farm to run a bookstore., The View From Orbit Bookstore in Nacogdoches, Texas, with her husband Joe. She later sold the bookstore, which served the students of Stephen F. Austin State University and people in the East Texas area, providing books that would otherwise have been unavailable locally.

== Work ==
She moved back to Texas to become a fantasy and science-fiction writer, and lived on a place bordering the Attoyac River as it entered the Sam Rayburn Lake, which is in the Big Thicket country (today just outside the official Big Thicket National Preserve).

Her juvenile novels (what would now be called 'young adult') were divided between her 'East Texas' series with regional settings, and her fantasy works for that age group. She often featured strong-minded and morally-certain adolescent girl heroines at a time when it was not fashionable to do so.

Until her health began to fail, her reputation was such that she still spoke regularly in the area, drawing large crowds.

Joe R. Lansdale wrote "Ardath Mayhar writes damn fine books!"

== Papers ==
The main collection of her papers is the Ardath Mayhar Papers at the East Texas Research Center of the Stephen F. Austin State University. There is also an Ardath Mayhar Papers collection at The University of Southern Mississippi, and a substantial amount of correspondence with fellow author Andre Norton in Norton's papers at Syracuse University's Special Collections Research Center.

== Awards ==
Mayhar was nominated for the Mark Twain Award, and won the Balrog Award for a horror narrative poem in Masques I, and had numerous other nominations for awards in almost every fiction genre, and won many awards for poetry.

== Bibliography ==
She was the author or co-author of:

Poetry collections

- Journey to an Ending
- Reflections

Novels (science fiction)

- The World Ends in Hickory Hollow
- Monkey Station: The Macaque Cycle, Book One ^{†}
- Trail of the Seahawks: The Macaque Cycle, Book Two ^{†}
- Messengers in White
- A Planet Called Heaven
- Shock Treatment
- Exile on Vlahi
- Khi to Freedom
- The Snowlost

Novels (fantasy)

- How the Gods Wove in Kyrannon: Tales of the Triple Moons
- Makra Choria: A Novel of High Fantasy
- A Road of Stars: A Fantasy of Life, Death, Love
- Soul-Singer of Tyrnos (Tyrnos cycle)
- Runes of the Lyre (Tyrnos cycle)
- Exiles of Damaria: Riddles and Dreams
- Exiles of Damaria: Ships & Seekers
- The Saga of Grittel Sundotha (comedy fantasy)
- The Wall (supernatural fantasy)
- The Tulpa
- Two-moons and the Black Tower
- Witchfire ^{†}

Juvenile novels (East Texas settings)

- The Absolutely Perfect Horse: A Novel of East Texas (with Marylois Dunn)
- Medicine Walk
- Timber Pirates (with Marylois Dunn)
- Carrots and Miggle: a novel of East Texas
- The Dropouts: growing up in East Texas
- The Lintons of Skillet Bend

Juvenile novels (science fiction)

- A Place of Silver Silence (for 9-10 year olds)

Juvenile novels (fantasy)

- Lords of the Triple Moons (Triple Moons, first in the juvenile series)
- Seekers of Shar-Nuhn (Triple Moons series)
- Warlock's Gift: A Novel of High Fantasy (Triple Moons series)
- The Door in the Hill (for 9-10 year olds)

Novels (prehistoric America)

- Hunters of the Plains
- The Island in the Lake
- Passage West
- People of the Mesa
- Towers of the Earth

Continuation series novels

- Golden Dream: A Fuzzy Odyssey (continuation of H. Beam Piper's Fuzzy series)
- The Sword and the Dagger (an addition to the Battletech series)
- The Body in the Swamp (Washington Shipp mystery #2)

Novels (westerns)

- Feud At Sweetwater Creek
- Bloody Texas Trail (as 'Frank Cannon')
- Blood Kin (as 'John Killdeer')
- High Mountain Winter: A Novel of the Old West
- Vendetta: A Novel of the Old West
- Texas Gunsmoke
- The Untamed
- Wild Country
- Wilderness Rendezvous
- Prescription for Danger
- Medicine Dream

Suspense and mystery

- Deadly Memoir
- Closely Knit in Scarlett
- The Clarrington Heritage

Comics

- The Adapter (sci-fi comic with Fernando H. Ramirez)

Story collections

- Crazy Quilt: The Best Short Stories Of Ardath Mayhar
- Mean Little Old Lady at Work: The Selected Works of Ardath Mayhar
- The Methodist Bobcat and Other Tales (tales of East Texas)
- Slewfoot Sally and the Flying Mule ('tall tales' of Cotton County, East Texas)
- The Loquat Eyes: More Tall Tales from Cotton County, Texas
- Strange Doin's in the Pine Hills: stories of fantasy and mystery in East Texas (dark and weird tales of East Texas)
- Dark Regions (horror stories collection)
- The Crystal Skull (horror stories collection)
- A World of Weirdities: Tales to Shiver (weird tales)

Non-fiction

- Through a Stone Wall: Lessons from Thirty Years of Writing
- Strange View from a Skewed Orbit (autobiography)

Short and critical articles

- "Creating Fantasy Folk" in the advice anthology How to write tales of horror, fantasy & science, 1987.
- "On Fantasy vs. SF writing", in the journal Quantum, Summer 1990.
- "The Analog 'We'", in Thrust magazine (Spring 1988). (Makes the case that speculative fiction can influence the real world).
- "Where Has All The Nonsense Gone?", in Thrust magazine (Winter 1988). (Sets out the need to retain fun, humour and optimism in the face of the changing state of science-fiction and fantasy).

^{†} With Ron Fortier
