= H. Beam Piper =

American science fiction writer

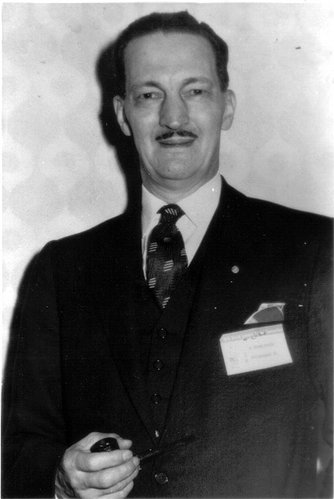
- Piper in 1952
- Born: Henry Beam Piper; March 23, 1904; Altoona, Pennsylvania, U.S.
- Died: c. November 6, 1964 (aged 60); Williamsport, Pennsylvania, U.S.
- Occupation: Novelist
- Writing career
- Pen name: Horace Beam Piper, Herbert Beam Piper
- Period: 20th century
- Genres: Science fiction, alternate history

Henry Beam Piper (March 23, 1904 – c. November 6, 1964) was an American science fiction writer. He wrote many short stories and several novels. He is best known for his extensive Terro-Human Future History series of stories and a shorter series of "Paratime" alternate history tales.

He wrote under the name H. Beam Piper. Another source gives his name as "Horace Beam Piper" and a different date of death. His gravestone says "Henry Beam Piper". Piper himself may have been the source of part of the confusion; he told people the H stood for Horace, encouraging the assumption that he used the initial because he disliked his name. On a copy of Little Fuzzy given to Charles O. Piper, Beam's cousin and executor, he wrote "To Charles from Henry."

== Biography ==
Piper was largely self-educated; he obtained his knowledge of science and history "without subjecting myself to the ridiculous misery of four years in the uncomfortable confines of a raccoon coat." He went to work at age 18 as a laborer at the Pennsylvania Railroad's Altoona yards in Altoona, Pennsylvania. He also worked as a night watchman for the railroad.

Piper published his first short story, "Time and Time Again", in 1947 in Astounding Science Fiction; it was adapted for the radio program Dimension X and first broadcast in 1951, and was re-produced for X Minus One in 1956. He was primarily a short story author until 1961, when he made a productive, if short-lived, foray into novels. He collected guns and wrote one mystery, Murder in the Gunroom.

In 1964, his career apparently on the skids, and prevented by reticence and his libertarian principles from asking anyone to assist him with his financial difficulties, Piper committed suicide. The exact date of his death is unknown; the last entry in his diary was dated November 5 ("Rain 0930"), and according to his Pennsylvania death certificate, his body was found on November 8. According to Jerry Pournelle's introduction to Little Fuzzy, Piper shut off all the utilities to his apartment, put painter's drop-cloths over the walls and floor, and took his own life with a handgun from his collection. In his suicide note, he gave an explanation that "I don't like to leave messes when I go away, but if I could have cleaned up any of this mess, I wouldn't be going away. H. Beam Piper."

Piper's grave, located in Altoona, PA.

Some biographers attribute his act to financial problems, others to family problems; Pournelle wrote that Piper felt burdened by financial hardships in the wake of a divorce, and the mistaken perception that his career was foundering (his agent had died without notifying him of multiple sales). Editor George H. Scithers, who knew Piper socially, has stated that Piper wanted to spite the ex-wife he despised: by killing himself, Piper voided his life insurance policy, and prevented her from collecting.

An unpublished story, "Only the Arquebus", was missing after his suicide; it is probable that he destroyed it along with many of his personal papers.

His output was eventually purchased by Ace Science Fiction and reprinted in a set of paperbacks in the early 1980s. Many of these have since gone out of print, though his two best-known arcs were again reprinted by Ace in 1998 and 2001. Late in his career, Piper corresponded with Pournelle, who was the Ace editor who helped reprint some of his novels.

Many of his earlier copyrights have been allowed to lapse, permitting Project Gutenberg to distribute his work online.

== Themes and hallmarks ==
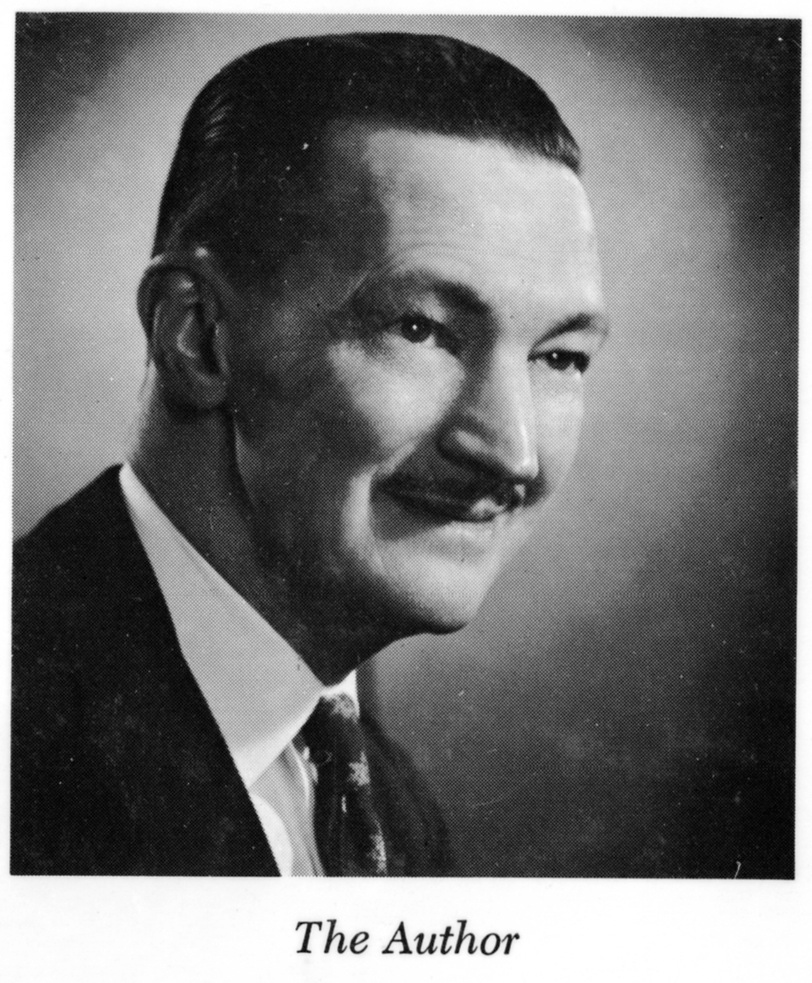
Piper in 1961

Piper's stories fall into two groups: stark space opera, such as Space Viking, or stories of cultural conflict or misunderstanding, such as Little Fuzzy or the Paratime stories.

A running theme in his work is that history repeats itself; past events will have direct and clear analogues in the future. The novel Uller Uprising is the clearest example of this, being based on the Sepoy Mutiny. A similar example is the very title of Space Viking, although the novel is not a direct reinterpretation of a specific historical precedent. A later theme in the book involves the takeover of a planet in a manner reminiscent of the rise of Adolf Hitler.

Piper's characterization was rooted in the notion of the self-reliant man, able to take care of himself and both willing and able to tackle any situation that might arise. This is exemplified in a bit of dialogue in his short story "Oomphel in the Sky" (1960):

He actually knows what has to be done and how to do it, and he's going right ahead and doing it, without holding a dozen conferences and round-table discussions and giving everybody a fair and equal chance to foul things up for him.

As a result, his stories tend towards the heroic, and the conflict is usually driven externally.

Piper was interested in general semantics. It is explicitly mentioned in Murder in the Gunroom, and its principles, such as awareness of the limitations of knowledge, are apparent in his later work.

== Major storylines ==
=== Terro-Human Future History ===
The Terro-Human Future History is Piper's detailed account of the next 6,000 years of human history. 1942, the year the first fission reactor was constructed, is defined as the year 1 A.E. (Atomic Era). In 1973, a nuclear war devastates the planet, eventually laying the groundwork for the emergence of a Terran Federation, once humanity goes into space and develops antigravity technology.

The story "The Edge of the Knife" (collected in Empire) occurs slightly before the war, and involves a man who sees flashes of the future. It links many key elements of Piper's series.

Most of the stories take place during the next millennium, during the age of the two Federations. Most notable among these novels are the three Fuzzy novels (starting with Little Fuzzy), which concern the recognition of a peculiar alien species as sapient, and the efforts of the two species to learn to live together on the Fuzzies' home world of Zarathustra.

The Federation collapses in the System States War and following Interstellar Wars (a bit of which can be seen in The Cosmic Computer), leading to a lengthy interregnum, during which there is no central human power. Space Viking is set in this chaotic period.

The interregnum ends with the founding of the first Empire. At least five empires rule humanity during the next four thousand years, but only a handful of short stories (collected in Empire) depict this period. Piper generally portrays these empires as benign, ruled by enlightened despots.

Piper's future history resembles in some ways Isaac Asimov's Foundation Trilogy, and was probably influenced by it, especially since both authors wrote for John W. Campbell.

=== Paratime ===
A much shorter series of alternate history stories is Piper's Paratime sequence, collected in Paratime, followed by the novel Lord Kalvan of Otherwhen. These stories concern the Paratime Police, a law enforcement outfit from a parallel world which has learned how to move between timelines. They jealously guard the secret, even as they mine other worlds for their resources. Notably, it appears that humans are in fact Martian refugees who escaped a calamity on their home planet and migrated to Earth.

Unlike many alternate histories which focus on recent historical events, these stories tend to focus on points of divergence far back in the past. For instance, Lord Kalvan involves a police officer who is accidentally transported to a world where the ancestors of modern Europeans failed to move into Europe. Instead, the nomadic tribes migrated across Asia and into North America. The people living on the eastern coast of North America in this novel settled the area from the west, and still live in a medieval society.

Many readers point towards the short story "Genesis" (anthologized in The Worlds of H. Beam Piper) to suggest that the Terro-Human Future History universe is in fact an alternate world in the Paratime universe, where the Martians' escape from Mars resulted in their forgetting their heritage and having to start over. However, in several letters to friends and in an article published in a fan magazine, Piper himself listed the true Paratime stories, and he never identified "Genesis" as one. On the other hand, "He Walked Around The Horses" is referenced in "Police Operation" so that is a sidebar story to the series.

"Omnilingual" (1957)

Similarly, Piper's story "Omnilingual" (1957), which concerns a near-future scientific expedition to Mars under the aegis of an international Earth government, may also be a Paratime story. The scientists and scholars involved in this effort are found in medias res excavating the ruins of the advanced human civilization which had been gradually destroyed on the fourth planet some 50,000 years before. In "Omnilingual" there is no mention of the northern hemisphere's thermonuclear devastation as a result of the NATO/Communist "cold war" kindled into an orgy of extermination by the impact of an antimatter meteorite, which was detailed by Piper in his story "The Answer" (1959). Throughout the Terro-Human Future History, that conflict and the destruction wrought across the nations of the First and Second Worlds is pervasive as an explanation of the precise manner in which the home planet's culture (by way of South America, Australia, and South Africa in particular) comes to influence the planets of Piper's Federation and Empire.

== Published works ==
=== Terro-Human Future History ===
==== Federation series ====
- Uller Uprising (1952) ISBN 0-441-84292-5 (refers to the 1983 edition)
- Four-Day Planet (1961) ISBN 0-441-24891-8 (refers to the 1981 edition: Four-Day Planet/Lone Star planet)
- The Cosmic Computer (1963, originally Junkyard Planet) ISBN 0-441-11759-7 (refers to the 1983 edition.) Based on the short story "Graveyard of Dreams", published in Galaxy Magazine February 1958.
- Space Viking (1963) ISBN 0-441-77784-8 (refers to the 1983 edition)
- Federation (1981) ISBN 0-441-23191-8
- Empire (1981) ISBN 0-441-20557-7 (refers to the May 1983 Mass Market Paperback Ed.)

==== Fuzzy series ====
Little Fuzzy (1962)

1. Little Fuzzy (1962), illustrated by Wayne Anderson in 1977 ISBN 0-441-48498-0,
2. Fuzzy Sapiens (1964, originally The Other Human Race), illustrated by Wayne Anderson in 1977 ISBN 0-441-26196-5
3. Fuzzies and Other People (1984) ISBN 0-441-26176-0

===== Collections =====
- The Fuzzy Papers (February 1977) ISBN ? (hdbk.)--collecting Little Fuzzy and Fuzzy Sapiens.
- The Fuzzy Papers (September 1980) ISBN 0-441-26193-0 (pbk.) --collecting Little Fuzzy and Fuzzy Sapiens.
- The Complete Fuzzy (1998) ISBN 0-441-00581-0 (pbk.)--collecting Little Fuzzy, Fuzzy Sapiens, and Fuzzies and other People.

=== Paratime ===
- Paratime (1981) ISBN 0-441-65169-0
- The Complete Paratime (2001) ISBN 0-441-00801-1
- Lord Kalvan of Otherwhen (1965, reprinted 1984), ISBN 0-441-49055-7. (also published as Gunpowder God by Sphere Science Fiction).
- Short stories: "Last Enemy"; "Time Crime" in two parts; "Temple Trouble"; "Police Operation"; and according to some, "Genesis". "He Walked Around The Horses" is referenced in "Police Operation" so that is a sidebar story to the tale.

=== Other novels ===
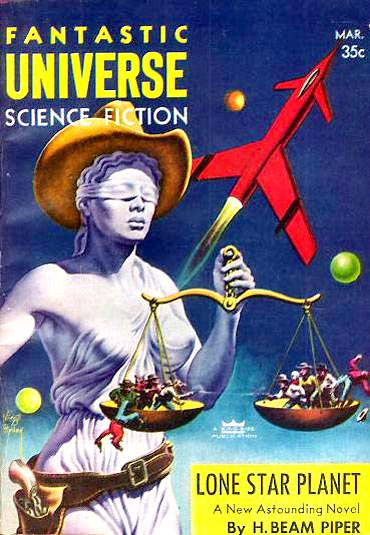
Lone Star Planet was originally published in the March 1957 issue of Fantastic Universe

- Murder in the Gunroom (1953, not science fiction but rather a murder mystery) ISBN 1-882968-02-6
- Crisis In 2140 (1957, with John J. McGuire, half of Ace Double D-227). This was first serialized in Astounding Science Fiction as Null-ABC, copyright 1953.
- Lone Star Planet (1958, originally A Planet for Texans) with John J. McGuire ISBN 0-441-24892-6. The work is based on an essay by H. L. Mencken, "The Malevolent Jobholder" (from The American Mercury, June 1924). In 1999, the novel won the Prometheus Award Hall of Fame Award for Best Classic Libertarian SF Novel. This tongue-in-cheek tale features a planet of Texans whose dinosaur-sized cattle have to be herded with tanks, and whose system of government derives its character from Mencken's essay.
- First Cycle (1982), expanded by Michael Kurland from a Piper outline. ISBN 0-441-23919-6

=== Short stories ===
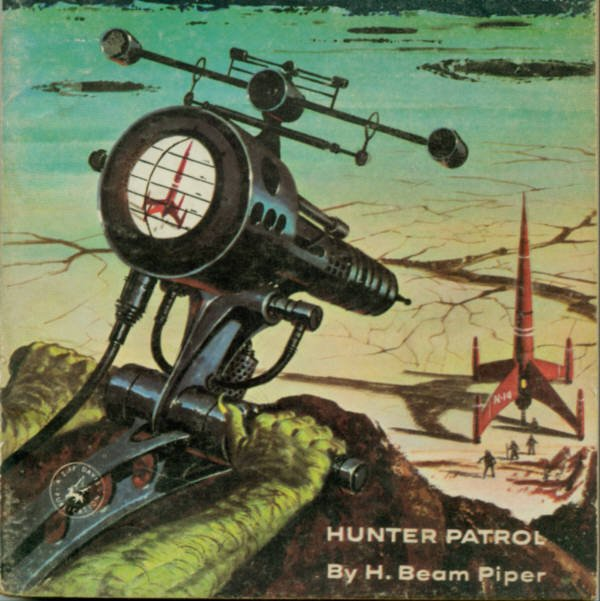
Cover of Hunter Patrol, written with John J. McGuire

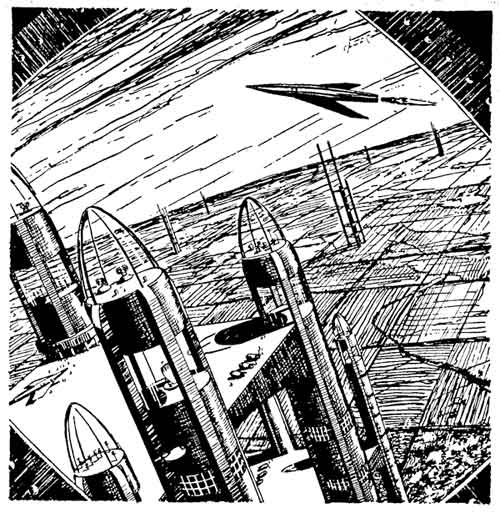
Illustration from "Last Enemy" (1950)

- "The Answer" (1959)
- "Crossroads of Destiny" (1959)
- "Day of the Moron" (1951)
- "Dearest" (1951)
- "The Edge of the Knife" (1957)
- "Flight From Tomorrow" (1950)
- "Genesis" (1951)
- "Graveyard of Dreams" (1958)
- "He Walked Around the Horses" (1948), published in Kingsley Amis, The Golden Age of Science Fiction (1981)
- "Hunter Patrol" (1959, with John J. McGuire) (1959)
- "The Keeper" (1957)
- "Last Enemy" (1950)
- "The Mercenaries" (1950)
- "Ministry of Disturbance" (with John J. McGuire) (1958)
- "Naudsonce" (1962)
- "Omnilingual" (1957)
- "Oomphel in the Sky" (1960)
- "Operation R.S.V.P." (1951)
- "Police Operation" (1948)
- "Rebel Raider" (1950)
- "The Return" (1954) (with John J. McGuire)
- "The Return" (1960) (with John J. McGuire) expanded version of the original
- "A Slave is a Slave" (1962)
- "Temple Trouble" (1951)
- "Time and Time Again" (1947)
- "Time Crime" (1955)
- "When in the Course—" (1981)

=== Collections ===
- The Worlds of H. Beam Piper (1983) ISBN 0-441-91052-1

=== Piper's Fuzzies in books by other authors ===
- Fuzzy Bones, by William Tuning - Sequel to Little Fuzzy & Fuzzy Sapiens 1981 ISBN 0-441-26181-7
- Golden Dream, by Ardath Mayhar - based on works by H. Beam Piper & William Tuning 1982 ISBN 0-441-29726-9
- Fuzzy Nation, by John Scalzi ISBN 0-765-36703-3
- Fuzzy Ergo Sum, by Wolfgang Diehr ISBN 0-937-91217-4
- Caveat Fuzzy, by Wolfgang Diehr (A sequel to Fuzzy Ergo Sum) ISBN 0-937-91222-0
- The Fuzzy Conundrum, by John F. Carr and Wolfgang Diehr ISBN 0-937-91266-2

=== Piper's "Terro-Human History" books by other authors ===
- The Last Space Viking, by John F. Carr and Mike Robertson
- Space Viking's Throne, by John F. Carr and Mike Robertson (A sequel to the Last Space Viking)
- The Way of the Sword-Worlds, by John F. Carr and Mike Robertson (A prequel to Space Viking involving Otto Harkaman, coming in 2021)
- Return of Space Viking, by John F. Carr (A direct sequel to Space Viking, confirmed by the author for late 2021 and is the long-awaited book once announced by Jerry Pournelle)
- Rise of the Terran Federation, Edited by John F. Carr (A new anthology due in 2016)
- Cosmic Computer Legacy: The Tides of Chaos, by Dietmar Wehr (A sequel to Cosmic Computer)
- Space Viking Legacy: The Tanith Gambit, by Dietmar Wehr (A sequel to Space Viking released as an ebook in 2013)
- Space Viking Legacy: Book II: The Loki Gambit, by Dietmar Wehr (released as an ebook in 2013)
- Prince of Tanith: A Space Viking Novel (The Tanith Series)by Terry Mancour (A sequel to Space Viking on Amazon Kindle)
- Princess Valerie's War: A Space Viking Novel (The Tanith Series Book II) by Terry Mancour on Amazon Kindle

=== "Paratime" books by other authors ===
- Great King's War, by John F. Carr and Roland Green
- Kalvan Kingmaker, by John F. Carr
- The Siege of Tos-Hostigos, by John F. Carr
- The Fireseed Wars, by John F. Carr
- Gunpowder God, by John F. Carr
- The Hos-Bletha Affair, by John F. Carr and Wolfgang Diehr
- Time Crime, by H. Beam Piper and John F. Carr (Carr expanded the previous novella with a third act)
