= John F. Carr =

American novelist (born 1944)

- Born: John Francis Carr; December 25, 1944 (age 81); Philadelphia, Pennsylvania, U.S.
- Occupations: Writer, editor
- Writing career
- Language: English
- Genre: Science fiction

John Francis Carr (born December 25, 1944) is an American science fiction editor and writer as well as an "authority" of the works of H. Beam Piper.

== Career ==
Carr was born in Philadelphia, Pennsylvania, and raised in San Diego, California.

He is the author of seven published novels and, along with co-editor Jerry Pournelle, he has edited over twenty theme anthologies and short story collections. He is also an authority on the life and works of H. Beam Piper and his biography H. Beam Piper: A Biography, was published in 2008. His other works include the space opera The Ophidian Conspiracy and several novels (some co-written with Roland J. Green) set in the Paratime universe of H. Beam Piper).

He is also recognized as an editor, having edited numerous collections or series involving Libertarian science fiction and Military science fiction. He is best known for working with Jerry Pournelle. In 2002, Carr and Pournelle were honored with a Prometheus Award for editing The Survival of Freedom.

== Published works ==
=== Novels ===
- The Ophidian Conspiracy (1976), re-released in 2016 as an e-book
- Pain Gain (1977)
- Carnifex Mardi Gras (1982)
- Time Crime (2010)
- Rainbow Run (2012) with Camden Benares
- The Crying Clown Celebration: A Certain Flair for Death (2013) with Camden Benares
- The Merlin Binary (2014) with Dietmar Wehr

=== Continuation of works by H. Beam Piper ===
==== Lord Kalvan of Otherwhen ====
- Great Kings' War (1985) with Roland J. Green
- Kalvan Kingmaker (2000)
- Siege of Tarr-Hostigos (2003)
- The Fireseed Wars (2009)
- The Hos Blethan Affair (2014) with Wolfgang Diehr
- Gunpowder God (2016)
- Down Styphon (2016)

==== Space Viking ====
- The Last Space Viking (2011) with Mike Robertson
- Space Viking's Throne (2012) with Mike Robertson

==== Little Fuzzy ====
- The Fuzzy Cunundrum (2016) with Wolfgang Diehr

=== Short fiction series ===
- Horseclans Universe
- Friends of the Horseclans
- Nightfriend (1987) with Roland J. Green
- Dirt Brother (1989) with Roland J. Green

=== Short-fiction ===
- Dance of the Dwarfs (1982)
- Rate of Exchange (1988) with Roland J. Green

=== Non-fiction ===
- H. Beam Piper: A Biography (2008)
- Typewriter Killer (2015) A second volume of H. Beam Piper biography.

=== Anthology series ===
==== Nebula Awards ====
- Nebula Award Stories Sixteen (1982) with Jerry Pournelle

==== There Will Be War ====
- 1 There Will Be War (1983) with Jerry Pournelle
- 3 Blood and Iron (1984) with Jerry Pournelle [only as by John F. Carr and J. E. Pournelle]
- 7 Call to Battle (1988) with Jerry Pournelle
- 8 Armageddon! (1989) with Jerry Pournelle

==== The Endless Frontier ====
- 2 The Endless Frontier Vol. II (1982) with Jerry Pournelle
- 3 Cities in Space (1991) with Jerry Pournelle
- 4 Life Among the Asteroids (1992) with Jerry Pournelle

==== Imperial Stars ====
- 1 The Stars At War (1986) with Jerry Pournelle
- 2 Republic and Empire (1987) with Jerry Pournelle
- 3 The Crash of Empire (1989) with Jerry Pournelle

==== War World ====
- 1 The Burning Eye (1988) with Jerry Pournelle and Roland Green, re-released, with additional material, in 2015 as an e-book.
- 2 Death's Head Rebellion (1990) with Jerry Pournelle and Roland Green
- 3 Sauron Dominion (1991) with Jerry Pournelle
- 4 Invasion (1994) with Jerry Pournelle
- Codominium: Revolt on War World (1992) with Jerry Pournelle
- War World: Blood Feuds (1993) with Jerry Pournelle
- War World: Blood Vengeance (1993) with Jerry Pournelle
- War World: The Battle of Sauron (2007) with Don Hawthorne
- War World: Discovery (2010)
- War World: Takeover (2011)
- War World: The Lidless Eye (2013) with Don Hawthorne
- War World: Cyborg Revolt (2013)
- War World: Jihad! (2013)
- War World: The Patriotic Wars (2016)
- War World: Falkenberg's Regiment (2018)
- War World: The Fall of the CoDominion (2020)
- War World: Andromeda Flight (2021)
- War World: Road Warriors (2023)
- War World: The Falkenberg Protectorate (2023)

=== Anthologies ===
- The Survival of Freedom (1981) with Jerry Pournelle
- The Science Fiction Yearbook (1985) with Jerry Pournelle and James P. Baen

=== Essays ===
- Letter (Locus #216) (1978)
- Introduction (Empire) (1981)
- Introduction (Paratime) (1981)
- Introduction (Federation) (1981)
- Shapes of Things to Come (1982)
- Introduction (The Worlds of H. Beam Piper) (1983)
- Introduction (Uller Uprising) (1983)
- Letter (Locus #312) (1987)
- State of the Art: The Last Cavalier: H. Beam Piper (1988)
- Dramatis Personae (Great Kings' War) (2006) with Roland J. Green
- Introduction (Cosmic Computer) (2014)

=== Essay series ===
- Terro-Human
- Terro-Human Future History Chronology (1981)

Carr's Pequod Press released Fuzzy Ergo Sum (2011) and "Caveat Fuzzy" (2012) by Wolfgang Diehr. These novels pick up where the original series by H. Beam Piper left off, continuing the story of Little Fuzzy and his fuzzy and human companions.
