= List of Ace western numeric-series single titles =

Ace Books have published hundreds of western titles, starting in 1952. Most of these were Ace Doubles (dos-à-dos format), but they also published a few single volumes. Between 1952 and 1968, the books had a letter-series identifier; after that date they were given five digit numeric serial numbers. There are 38 number-series western titles in the list below, but it may be incomplete.

The list given here gives a date of publication; in all cases this refers to the date of publication by Ace, and not the date of original publication of the novels. For more information about the history of these titles, see Ace Books, which includes a discussion of the serial numbering conventions used and an explanation of the letter-code system.

- 04745 WE Edgar Rice Burroughs The Bandit of Hell's Bend
- 14194 WE Nelson Nye Death Valley Slim
- 14198 WE John Bickham Decker's Campaign
- 14240 WE Wayne C. Lee Die-Hard
- 14247 WE Edgar Rice Burroughs The Deputy Sheriff of Comanche County
- 22725 WE Nelson Nye Hellbound for Ballarat (1970)
- 28911 WE Edgar Rice Burroughs The Girl from Hollywood
- 29741 WE Todhunter Ballard Gold in California (1965)
- 29743 WE Todhunter Ballard Gold in California (1965)
- 30710 WE Giles A. Lutz Gun Rich
- 32575 WE Charles O. Locke The Hell Bent Kid
- 48877 WE Giles A. Lutz The Lonely Ride
- 48918 WE Nelson Nye Long Run
- 51642 WE Ray Hogan The Man from Barranca Negra
- 52740 WE L.P. Homes The Maverick Star (1969)
- 54460 WE Edgar Rice Burrough The Mucker (1974)
- 64512 WE Edgar Rice Burroughs The Outlaw of Torn
- 67131 WE L. L. Foreman Plundering Gun
- 71076 WE Clifton Adams Reckless Men
- 71816 WE Edgar Rice Burroughs The Return of the Mucker
- 72280 WE Edgar Rice Burroughs The Rider
- 72360 WE John Callahan Ride the Wild Land & Jernigan (1965)
- 73425 WE L. L. Foreman Rogue's Legacy (1968)
- 75617 WE Ray Hogan Showdown on Texas Flat
- 76015 WE Robert Mccaig The Shadow Maker (1970)
- 76181 WE Louis L'Amour (as Jim Mayo) Showdown at Yellow Butte
- 77520 WE Wayne Lee Son of a Gunman
- 77918 WE James Powell Stage to Seven Springs
- 78830 WE Giles A. Lutz The Stranger
- 79805 WE Roy Manning Tangled Trail
- 80400 WE Nelson Nye The Texas Gun
- 80575 WE Nelson Nye Thief River
- 82401 WE Ernest Haycox Trigger Trio
- 82410 WE D.B. Newton Triple Trouble
- 82430 WE Nelson Nye Trouble At Quinn's Crossing
- 88010 WE T.V. Olsen Westward They Rode
- 90426 WE Lee Hoffman Gunfight at Laramie
- 90701 WE Robert J. Hogan The Wolver
