= Deaths in February 1979 =

The following is a list of notable deaths in February 1979. Entries for each day are listed alphabetically by surname. A typical entry lists information in the following sequence:

- Name, age, country of citizenship at birth, subsequent country of citizenship (if applicable), reason for notability, cause of death (if known), and reference.

== February 1979 ==
=== 1 ===
- Abdi İpekçi, 49, Turkish journalist, intellectual and human rights activist, he served as the editor-in-chief of the daily newspaper Milliyet which then had a centre-left political stance, murdered in his own car by two members of the ultra-nationalist organization Grey Wolves, with the killers identified as Oral Çelik and Mehmet Ali Ağca. A contradictory narrative about the murder reported that the clandestine Counter-Guerrilla (a Turkish branch of Operation Gladio) murdered İpekçi at the behest of the Central Intelligence Agency (CIA)'s station chief in Turkey.

=== 2 ===
- Sid Vicious, 21, English musician, he served as the second bassist for the punk rock band Sex Pistols, he was posthumously regarded as an icon of the punk subculture, and in particular thought to reprent its dark, decadent, and nihilistic aspects, death by drug overdose, on the day following his release from Rikers Island. There were claims that his death was an intentional suicide within a suicide pact, as Vicious reportedly left behind a handwritten suicide note with information about the pact and instructions for his own funeral."

=== 3 ===
- Betty Danko, 75, American stuntwoman and stunt double, she started her career as a stunt double at the Hal Roach Studios in 1927, she doubled for the actresses Jean Arthur, Binnie Barnes, Joan Crawford, Irene Dunne, Madge Evans, Jean Harlow, Patsy Kelly, Elissa Landi, Myrna Loy, Maureen O'Sullivan, Marie Prevost, Thelma Todd, Marie Windsor, and Blanche Yurka,her best-known job was doubling for Margaret Hamilton as the Wicked Witch of the West in the fantasy film The Wizard of Oz (1939), Danko's career was permanently cut short by an accident outside of her stunt work, when she was struck by a car that jumped the curb while she stood at a bus stop.
- Jody Gilbert, 62, American actress, she appeared frequently in both films and television, often in humorous supporting parts as "sizeable" but confident women, her best-known radio roles were as Marie Wilson's partner in My Friend Irma, and as Rosa in Life with Luigi, she was blacklisted in the early 1950s, because a screenwriter testified to the House Un-American Activities Committee (HUAC) that Gilbert was a communist, when she was summoned before the committee in March 1953, she made light of the proceedings by invoking the Nineteenth Amendment, and joking that it gave women "equal rights to decline" to answer questions, death from complications in long-term injuries which she had received in a car accident during the autumn of 1978.
- Nikolai Plotnikov, 81, Soviet and Russian actor, he was named as one of the People's Artists of the USSR in 1966
- Joan Standing, 75, English actress, she portrayed Nurse Briggs in the horror film Dracula (1931), the first entry of Universal's Dracula film series, her last film appearance was in the comic strip adaptation Li'l Abner (1940), death from cancer

=== 6 ===
- Issa Pliyev, 75, Soviet military commander, he was the premier cavalry general of the Soviet Army, described by military historians as successfully leading cavalry operations in "adverse terrain", having fought in several battles and operations during World War II, Pliyev towards the end of the war was in command of the Soviet-Mongolian cavalry mechanized group of the Transbaikal Front in Manchuria, fighting against Japan's Kwantung Army. during the Cuban Missile Crisis, Pliyev was the commander of a Group of Soviet forces taking part in Operation Anadyr in Cuba from July 1962 to May 1963.

=== 7 ===
- Josef Mengele, 67, German military officer and physician during World War II, he conducted research and experiments on prisoners at the Auschwitz II-Birkenau concentration camp, where he was a member of the team of doctors who selected victims to be murdered in the gas chambers, he set up his research facility in the Romani family camp, he was particularly interested in identical twins, people with heterochromia iridum (eyes of two different colors), people with dwarfism, and people with physical abnormalities, he also studied blood proteins, did anthropological studies of the Romani population, and collected specimens for forwarding to the SS Medical Academy in Graz,he suffered a stroke while swimming and drowned in the coastal resort of Bertioga, São Paulo.

=== 9 ===
- Dennis Gabor, 78, Hungarian-British physicist, he is credited with inventing holography, and he published his theories on this topic in a series of papers between 1946 and 1951, in 1958, Gabor patented a flat-screen CRT which was similar to Wiliam Ross Aiken's Aiken tube, and this led to a years-long patent battle between the two inventors. By the time the lawsuits were complete, with Aiken's patent applying in the United States and Gabor's in the United Kingdom, the commercial aspects of their designs had long lapsed, and the two became friends.

=== 10 ===
- Karl von Eberstein, 85, German nobleman and early member of the Schutzstaffel (SS number: 1,386),following several years of service, Eberstein was dismissed from all his posts on 20 April 1945, punished for "defeatism" by the Gauleiter Paul Giesler, on orders from Martin Bormann, Eberstein was later a witness at the Nuremberg Trials, in his testimony, Eberstein gave organizational and historical information about the SS, the Sturmabteilung (SA), their relationship with the German nobility, the Nazi Party, the Sicherheitsdienst (SD, Security Service) and the Gestapo (Secret State Police).
- Edvard Kardelj, 69, Yugoslav politician and economist, he played a major role in Yugoslavia's foreign policy by designing the fundamental ideological basis for the Yugoslav policy of nonalignment in the 1950s and the 1960s, during the 1950s, Kardelj rose to become the main theorist of Titoism and the Yugoslav workers' self-management, he died after spending 20 hours in a coma. His health had deteriorated due to colon cancer since 1977, and the cancer had spread to his lungs and liver.

=== 12 ===
- Jean Renoir, 84, French filmmaker, actor, producer and author, his films La Grande Illusion (1937) and The Rules of the Game (1939) are often cited by critics as among the greatest films ever made,heart attack.

=== 13 ===
- Yuri Merkulov, 77, Soviet animation and film director, conservator-restorer, he is credited as one of the founders of the Soviet school of traditional and stop motion animation. he worked on the satirical film China in Flames (1925), which was critical of European interference in the Chinese economy; with 1000 meters of film and 14 frames per second, it ran over 50 minutes at the time of completion, which made it the first Soviet animated feature film and one of the first animated feature films in the world.

=== 14 ===
- Reginald Maudling, 61, British politician, he served as the President of the Board of Trade from 1959 until 1961, as the Secretary of State for the Colonies from 1961 until 1962, as the Chancellor of the Exchequer from 1962 until 1964, and as the Home Secretary from 1970 until 1972, he led two unsuccessful leadership bids in 1963 and 1965, he was slightly injured in a failed assassination attempt in 1974, when an IRA member sent him a letter bomb.

=== 15 ===
- George Dunning, 58, Canadian filmmaker and animator, during the mid-1950s, he accepted a post with the studio United Productions of America (UPA) and spent a year as an animator on the series The Gerald McBoing-Boing Show,; in 1956, he was tasked with managing UPA's office in London,; after that office shut-down, Dunning and his new partner John Coates co-founded the production company TV Cartoons Ltd. in 1957, from 1965 to 1967, Dunning was the main producer of the cartoon series The Beatles, he was then tasked with directing the animated feature film Yellow Submarine (1968),; in order to meet the deadline of one year, Dunning quadrupled his staff and, aided by Coates and art director Heinz Edelmann, supervised as many as 200 artists,; he quarreled with his client, Al Brodax at King Features Syndicate, and the film's featured band The Beatles weren't interested in being involved, only agreeing at the last minute to take part in a live-action epilogue,; Dunning made the film for a flat fee, and made up budget over-runs with his own funds; Yellow Submarine was a smash hit, bringing Dunning a New York Film Critics Circle award and immense prestige.

=== 16 ===
- Louise Allbritton, 58, American actress, a former contract player for Universal Pictures, she portrayed the student of the occult Katherine Caldwell in the film Son of Dracula (1943), the third entry of Universal's Dracula film series, on television, she played the title role in the NBC series Concerning Miss Marlowe (1954–1955), death due to cancer in her residence in Puerto Vallarta, Mexico
- William Gargan, 73, American actor, he was nominated for the Academy Award for Best Supporting Actor for his role as Joe in the romantic drama They Knew What They Wanted (1940), he won the Screen Actors Guild Life Achievement Award in 1967, he portrayed the fictional detective Ellery Queen in the film A Close Call for Ellery Queen (1942), and its sequels A Desperate Chance for Ellery Queen (1942) and Enemy Agents Meet Ellery Queen (1942), he then portrayed another detective as the title character in Martin Kane, Private Eye (1949–1954), the first "successful" detective series on network television, Gargan suffered a fatal heart attack during a flight from New York City to San Diego, he was pronounced dead upon arrival to the San Diego Center City Hospital.

=== 20 ===
- Nereo Rocco, 66, Italian football player and manager, he served multiple terms as the manager of AC Milan (1961–1963, 1967–1972, 1973, and 1977), Rocco remains Milan's longest-serving manager, managing the club for 459 matches (323 as head coach and 136 as technical director), under Rocco's leadership, Milan won a scudetto in 1961–62, followed, in the next season, by Milan's first European Cup triumph, achieved after beating Benfica in the 1963 final, this success was repeated in 1969, with a 4–1 win over Ajax in the final, which was followed by the Intercontinental Cup title the same year, during this period Milan also won its ninth scudetto, its first Coppa Italia, with victory over Padova in the 1967 final, and two European Cup Winners' Cups in 1967–68 and 1972–73, after defeating in the last match Hamburg and Leeds United respectively.

=== 21 ===
- Ray Whitley, 77, country and western singer, songwriter, and actor, formerly a construction worker who took part on the building of the Empire State Building and the George Washington Bridge, in 1937, Whitley had worked with Gibson on the production of the Gibson SJ-200 acoustic guitar, which was initially known as the "Super Jumbo", Whitley used his own time and money to design a guitar, which he took to Gibson, he explained the features and merits of the instrument, suggesting that presenting them to other stars of the day would result in really putting the Gibson name on the musical instrument map; Whitley himself was the first performer to actually own a Gibson SJ-200, Whitley wrote the Western tune "Back in the Saddle Again" (1939), which was first performed by Whitley himself in the Western film Border G-Man (1938), he died suddenly while en route to a fishing trip to Mexico

=== 22 ===
- John Coleman Burroughs, 65, American illustrator, he was primarily known for illustrating the works of his own father Edgar Rice Burroughs, starting his career with the illustration of a collection of two short novels, The Oakdale Affair and The Rider(1937), John went on to illustrate all the books written by his father which were published during the author's lifetime,a total of over 125 illustrations; John also illustrated the John Carter Sunday newspaper strip, a David Innes of Pellucidar comic book feature and numerous Big Little Book covers.

=== 23 ===
- W. A. C. Bennett, 78, Canadian politician, he served as the premier of British Columbia from 1952 until 1972, Bennett was instrumental in establishing the Bank of British Columbia, in which the government took a 25% ownership, in 1955, Bennett advocated for a universal medical, dental, hospital, and pharmaceutical insurance coverage.

=== 26 ===
- Grace Arnold, 84, English actress, she portrayed Mrs. Hudson in the 1968 season of the television series Sherlock Holmes.

=== 28 ===
- Jane Hylton, 51, English actress, one of the "Rank Starlets" trained by Rank Organisation's acting school Company of Youth, she had a prominent role in the horror film Circus of Horrors (1960), she portrayed Beryl Fisher, the mother of Betty Spencer in the BBC comedy series Some Mothers Do 'Ave 'Em, death by heart attack, attributed to a congenital heart defect.

== Sources ==
- Ailsby, Christopher (1997). SS: Roll of Infamy. Motorbooks Intl. ISBN 0760304092.
- Evans, Richard J. (2008). The Third Reich at War. New York: Penguin. ISBN 978-0-14-311671-4.
- Freese, Gene Scott (2014). Hollywood Stunt Performers, 1910s-1970s: A Biographical Dictionary (2nd ed.). McFarland. ISBN 9780786476435.
- Glantz, David; House, Jonathan (2015). When Titans Clashed: How the Red Army Stopped Hitler. University Press of Kansas. ISBN 9780700621217.
- Hanke, Ken (2014) [1991]. A Critical Guide to Horror Film Series. Routledge. ISBN 978-0-415-72642-9.
- Harmatz, Aljean (2013). The Making of the Wizard of Oz. Chicago Review Press. ISBN 9781613748350.
- Howard, Anthony RAB: The Life of R. A. Butler, Jonathan Cape 1987 ISBN 978-0-224-01862-3
- Kubica, Helena (1998) [1994]. "The Crimes of Josef Mengele". In Gutman, Yisrael; Berenbaum, Michael (eds.). Anatomy of the Auschwitz Death Camp. Bloomington, Indiana: Indiana University Press. pp. 317–337. ISBN 978-0-253-20884-2.
- Marwell, David G. (2020). Mengele: Unmasking the "Angel of Death". New York: W. W. Norton & Company. ISBN 978-0-393-60953-0.
- Piper, Franciszek (2000). Długoborski, Wacław; Piper, Franciszek (eds.). Auschwitz, 1940–1945. Central Issues in the History of the Camp. Vol. III: Mass Murder. Oświęcim: Auschwitz-Birkenau State Museum. ISBN 978-8385047872. OCLC 929235229.
- Yerger, Mark C. (1997). Allgemeine-SS: The Commands, Units, and Leaders of the General SS. Atglen, PA: Schiffer Publishing Ltd. ISBN 0-7643-0145-4.
