= Ballarat, California =

US unincorporated community

Ballarat
- Unincorporated community
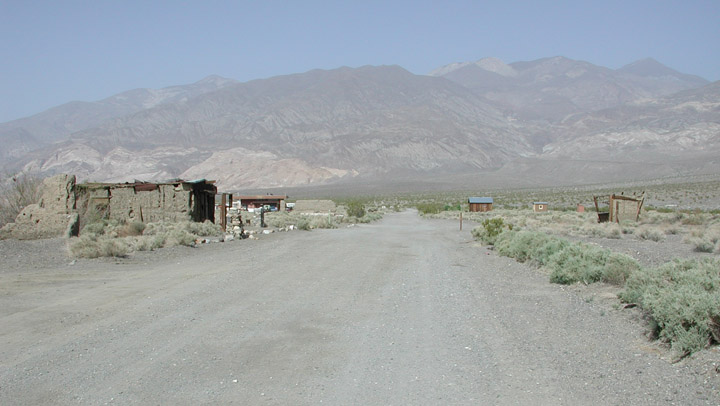
- Ballarat, California

- Location in California Ballarat (the United States)
- Coordinates: 36°02′52″N 117°13′24″W
- Country: United States
- State: California
- County: Inyo
- Elevation: 1,079 ft (329 m)
- ZIP code: 93592
- Area codes: 442/760
- FIPS code: 06-03680
- GNIS feature ID: 252847

Ballarat is an unincorporated community in Inyo County, California, United States. It was founded in 1897 as a supply point for the mines in the canyons of the Panamint Range. A quarter-mile to the south is Post Office Springs, a reliable water source used since the 1850s. George Riggins, an immigrant from Australia, gave Ballarat its name when he proposed it should be named for Ballarat in Victoria, Australia. It has been a virtual ghost town since the early 20th century.

== History ==
=== Early mining days ===
The town was founded in 1897. In its heyday—from 1897 to 1905—Ballarat had 400 to 500 residents. It hosted seven saloons, three hotels, a Wells Fargo station, post office (that opened in 1897), school, a jail and morgue, but no churches. Ballarat was a place for miners and prospectors to resupply and relax.

The town began to decline when the Ratcliff Mine, in Pleasant Canyon east of town, suspended operations. Other mines nearby also began to play out, and in 1917 the post office closed and all that remained were a few diehard prospectors and desert rats.

=== Later habitation ===
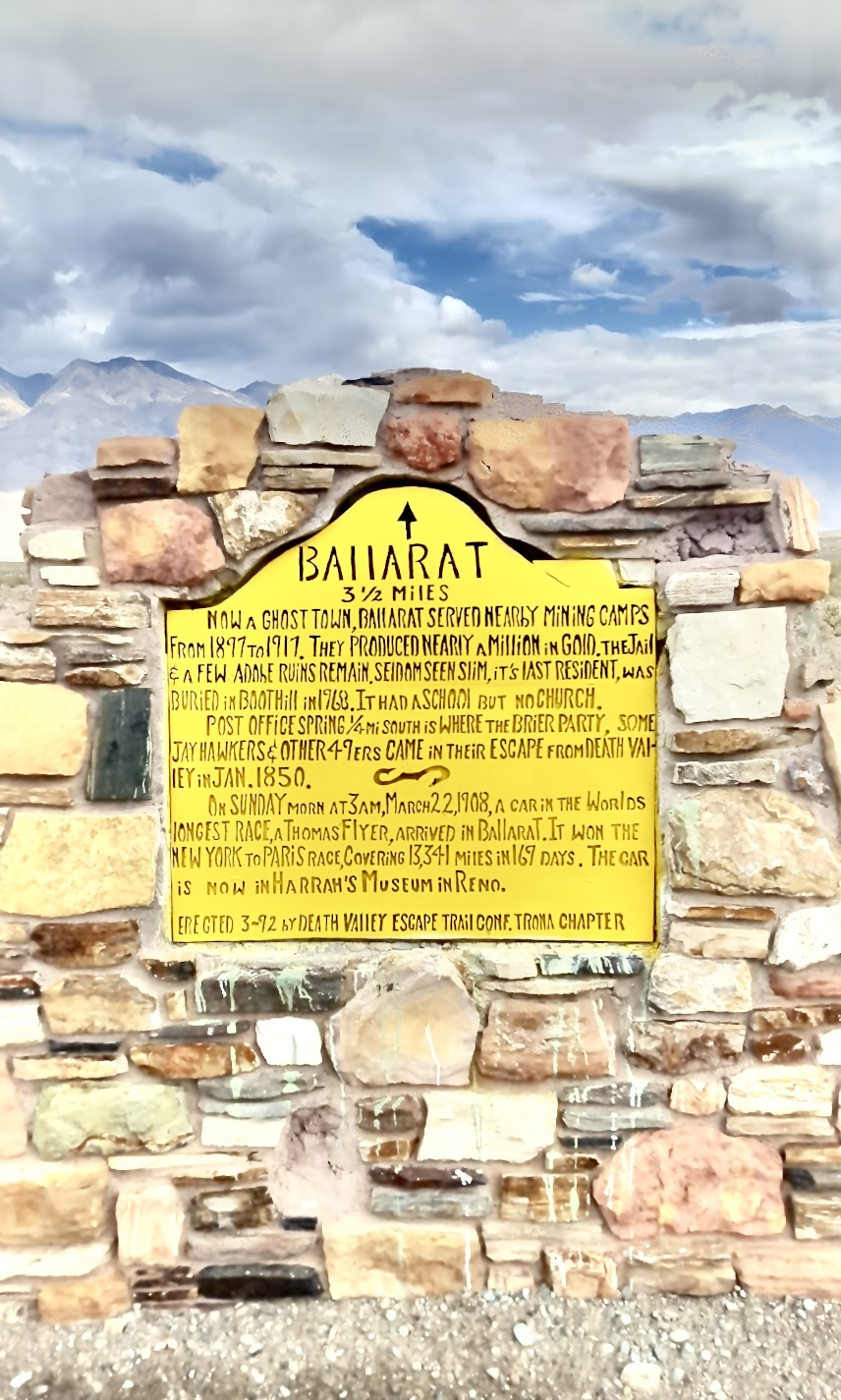
Highway marker 3.5 miles West of Ballarat

Seldom Seen Slim (Charles Ferge) was the sole resident of Ballarat from approximately 1918 until his 1968 death at the nearby Trona Hospital, where he died of cancer. Slim claimed not to have bathed in twenty years except for sloshing water on his naked body while standing outdoors. After the town's one remaining adobe building degraded beyond liveability, Slim lived in a Volkswagen and house trailer. Slim was the 28th and final person to be interred at Ballarat's boot hill. He used to say, "Just bury me where the digging's easy."

In the 1960s, Charles Manson and the "Manson Family" of killers moved into a ranch south of Ballarat, and left graffiti in the town. It is theorized that the green pickup truck left in Ballarat belonged to him, according to a framed picture and hand-written notes inside the trading post. The 1969 movie Easy Rider has a scene filmed in Ballarat. After arriving in the town, Peter Fonda's character, Wyatt, removes his Rolex watch and throws it away before he and Dennis Hopper's character, Billy, head east on their motorcycles towards New Orleans.

On Easter weekend, 1971, about two thousand people attended a "hippie" celebration at Ballarat; about two hundred of the attendees contracted hepatitis from contaminated drinking water.

=== 21st century ===
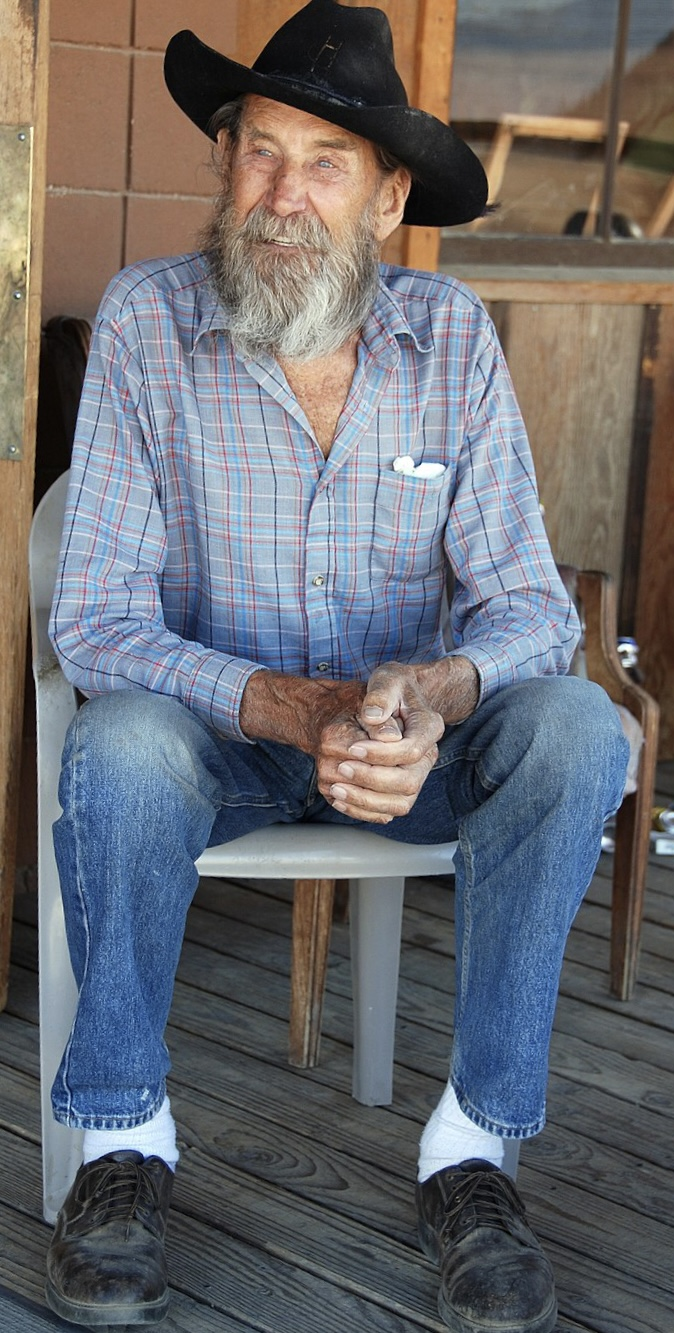
Former Ballarat resident George Novak

In 2018 Ballarat had three full-time residents: Rocky Novak and his two dogs, Potlicker and Brownie. On afternoons and weekends Rocky would run the general store, which primarily catered to tourists. Novak was featured in the 2018 film vignette "The Mayor of Ballarat" by Mickey Todiwala and Monika Delgado. The five-minute character piece featured a montage of various Ballarat locations with a voiceover narrated by Rocky describing his life in the town, while interjecting his various musings on human nature.

Around 2020, Novak moved to nearby Trona, and Ballarat's general store was then managed by other nearby residents. As of then, there were approximately two full-time town residents.

Ballarat is used as a meeting point for four wheeling expeditions into the Panamint Range and Death Valley, and in winter up to 300 people camp in the grounds of the town. The town was recently used as a set to tell the story of the Ballarat Bandit.

Ballarat was featured in an episode of Top Gear USA and the movie Obselidia.

The town ZIP Code is 93592, and is inside area codes 442 and 760.

== Ballarat in fiction ==
Ballarat has featured in Western fiction, including Hellbound for Ballarat (1970) by Nelson C. Nye and Bounty Hunt at Ballarat (1973) by Clayton Matthews.

== See also ==
- List of ghost towns in California
