= Alfred Hitchcock's Anthology – Volume 1 =

First installment of Alfred Hitchcock's Anthology

- First edition
- Author: Eleanor Sullivan
- Original title: Alfred Hitchcock's Tales to Keep You Spellbound
- Language: English
- Series: Alfred Hitchcock's Anthology
- Genre: Short Stories, crime fiction, detective fiction
- Publisher: The Dial Press
- Publication date: 1976
- Publication place: United States
- Media type: Print (paperback)
- Pages: 384 pp
- Followed by: AHA: Volume 2

Alfred Hitchcock's Anthology – Volume 1 is the first installment of Alfred Hitchcock's Anthology, one of the many Alfred Hitchcock story collection books; edited by Eleanor Sullivan. Originally published in hardcover in 1976 as Alfred Hitchcock's Tales to Keep You Spellbound, the book is a collection of 30 stories originally published in Alfred Hitchcock's Mystery Magazine.

== Contents ==
- The Pursuer by Holly Roth
- Final Arrangements by Lawrence Page
- Countdown by David Ely
- She is Not My Mother by Hilda Cushing
- Spook House by Clark Howard
- Second Chance by Robert Cenedella
- The Last Witness by Robert Colby
- Death à la Newburgh by Libby MacCall
- A Cold Day in November by Bill Pronzini
- A degree of Innocence by Helen Nielsen
- The Man We Found by Donald Honig
- Night on the Beach by Wenzell Brown
- Scott Free by Miriam Lynch
- A Very Cautious Boy by Gilbert Ralston
- A Try for the Big Prize by Borden Deal
- Killed by Kindness by Nedra Tyre
- Just a Minor Offense by John Suter
- The Long Terrible Day by Charlotte Edwards
- Cicero by Edward Wellen
- Winter Run by Edward D. Hoch
- You Can't Blame Me by Henry Slesar
- Death of a Derelict by Joseph Payne Brennan
- Present for Lona by Avram Davidson
- Murderer #2 by Jean Potts
- The Third Call by Jack Ritchie
- A Home away from Home by Robert Bloch
- The Handyman (1967) by Clayton Matthews
- Nothing But Human Nature by Hillary Waugh
- Murder, 1990 by C.B. Gilford
- Panther, Panther in the Night by Paul W. Fairman
