= James Ullman =

James Ullman may refer to:

- James Ramsey Ullman (1907–1971), American writer and mountaineer
- James Michael Ullman (1925–1997), American novelist and newspaper writer and editor
