= Glen Andrews =

Glen or Glenn Andrews may refer to:

- Glen Andrews (footballer) (born 1945), English footballer
- Glenn Andrews (1909–2008), U.S. Congressman from Alabama
- Glen Andrews, musician on Robbie Robertson's album Storyville
- Glenn Andrews (author), wrote Murder is Dominant, part of Alfred Hitchcock's Anthology – Volume 5
