= Electoral history of Wayne Morse =

Elections featuring American politician

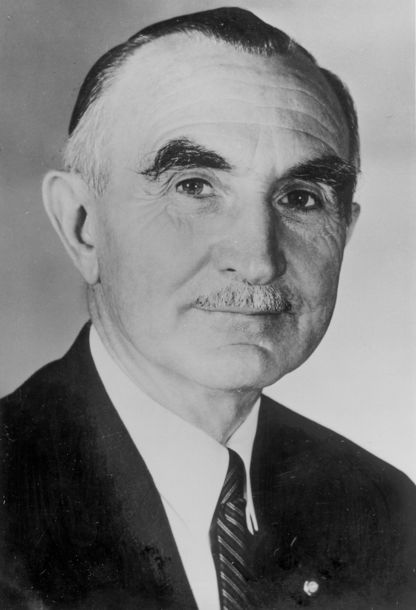
Wayne Morse

Electoral history of Wayne Morse, United States Senator from Oregon, candidate for the 1960 Democratic presidential nomination and Oregon favorite-son candidate in the 1952 Republican presidential primaries.

Originally a Republican, Morse became an independent in 1952 and a Democrat in 1955.

== 1944 ==

United States Senate election in Oregon, 1944
| Party | Candidate | Votes | % |
|---|---|---|---|
| Republican | Wayne Morse | 269,095 | 60.71 |
| Democratic | Edgar W. Smith | 174,140 | 39.29 |
| Total votes | | 443,235 | 100.00 |
| Republican hold | | | |

== 1950 ==

United States Senate election in Oregon, 1950
| Party | Candidate | Votes | % |
|---|---|---|---|
| Republican | Wayne Morse (incumbent) | 376,510 | 74.79 |
| Democratic | Howard LaTourette | 116,780 | 23.20 |
| Progressive | Harlin Talbert | 10,165 | 2.02 |
| Total votes | | 503,455 | 100.00 |
| Republican hold | | | |

== 1952 ==
Oregon Republican presidential primary, 1952:

- Dwight D. Eisenhower - 172,486 (64.55%)
- Earl Warren - 44,034 (16.48%)
- Douglas MacArthur - 18,603 (6.96%)
- Robert A. Taft (write-in) - 18,009 (6.74%)
- Wayne Morse - 7,105 (2.66%)
- Harold Stassen - 6,610 (2.47%)
- William R. Schneider - 350 (0.13%)

1952 Republican presidential primaries:

- Robert A. Taft - 2,794,736 (35.84%)
- Dwight D. Eisenhower - 2,050,708 (26.30%)
- Earl Warren - 1,349,036 (17.30%)
- Harold Stassen - 881,702 (11.31%)
- Thomas H. Werdel - 521,110 (6.68%)
- George T. Mickelson - 63,879 (0.82%)
- Douglas MacArthur - 44,209 (0.57%)
- Grant A. Ritter - 26,208 (0.34%)
- Edward C. Slettedahl - 22,712 (0.29%)
- Riley A. Bender - 22,321 (0.29%)
- Mary E. Kenny - 10,411 (0.13%)
- Wayne Morse - 7,105 (0.09%)
- Perry J. Stearns - 2,925 (0.04%)
- William R. Schneider - 580 (0.01%)

== 1956 ==

United States Senate election in Oregon, 1956
| Party | Candidate | Votes | % |
|---|---|---|---|
| Democratic | Wayne Morse (incumbent) | 396,849 | 54.20 |
| Republican | Douglas McKay | 335,405 | 45.80 |
| Total votes | | 732,254 | 100.00 |
| Democratic hold | | | |

== 1960 ==
District of Columbia Democratic presidential primary, 1960:

- Hubert Humphrey - 8,239 (57.35%)
- Wayne Morse - 6,127 (42.65%)

Maryland Democratic presidential primary, 1960:

- John F. Kennedy - 201,769 (70.31%)
- Wayne Morse - 49,420 (17.22%)
- Unpledged - 24,350 (8.49%)
- Lar Daly - 7,536 (2.63%)
- Andrew J. Easter - 3,881 (1.35%)

Oregon Democratic presidential primary, 1960:

- John F. Kennedy - 146,332 (50.97%)
- Wayne Morse - 91,715 (31.95%)
- Hubert Humphrey - 16,319 (5.68%)
- Stuart Symington - 12,496 (4.35%)
- Lyndon B. Johnson - 11,101 (3.87%)
- Adlai Stevenson (write-in) - 7,924 (2.76%)
- Others - 1,210 (0.42%)

1960 Democratic presidential primaries:

- John F. Kennedy - 1,847,259 (31.43%)
- Pat Brown - 1,354,031 (23.04%)
- George H. McLain - 646,387 (11.00%)
- Hubert Humphrey - 590,410 (10.05%)
- George Smathers - 322,235 (5.48%)
- Michael DiSalle - 315,312 (5.37%)
- Unpledged - 241,958 (4.12%)
- Albert S. Porter - 208,057 (3.54%)
- Wayne Morse - 147,262 (2.51%)
- Adlai Stevenson - 51,833 (0.88%)
- Lar Daly - 48,389 (0.82%)
- John H. Latham - 42,084 (0.72%)
- Stuart Symington - 29,740 (0.51%)
- Richard Nixon - 16,899 (0.29%)
- Lyndon B. Johnson - 15,691 (0.27%)

== 1962 ==

United States Senate election in Oregon, 1962
| Party | Candidate | Votes | % |
|---|---|---|---|
| Democratic | Wayne Morse (incumbent) | 344,716 | 54.15 |
| Republican | Sig Unander | 291,587 | 45.81 |
| none | write-ins | 253 | 0.04 |
| Total votes | | 636,556 | 100.00 |
| Democratic hold | | | |

== 1968 ==
=== Primary election ===
* Robert B. Duncan * Wayne Morse

Democratic primary for the United States Senate from Oregon, 1968
| Party | Candidate | Votes | % |
|---|---|---|---|
| Democratic | Wayne Morse (incumbent) | 185,091 | 49.03 |
| Democratic | Robert B. Duncan | 174,795 | 46.30 |
| Democratic | Phil McAlmond | 17,658 | 4.68 |
| Total votes | | 377,544 | 100.00 |

=== General election ===

United States Senate election in Oregon, 1968
| Party | Candidate | Votes | % |
|---|---|---|---|
| Republican | Bob Packwood | 408,646 | 50.20 |
| Democratic | Wayne Morse (incumbent) | 405,353 | 49.80 |
| Total votes | | 813,999 | 100.00 |
| Republican gain from Democratic | | | |

== 1972 ==
Democratic primary for the United States Senate from Oregon, 1972
| Party | Candidate | Votes | % |
|---|---|---|---|
| Democratic | Wayne Morse | 173,147 | 43.70 |
| Democratic | Robert B. Duncan | 130,845 | 33.03 |
| Democratic | Don Willner | 74,060 | 18.69 |
| Democratic | Ralph Wiser | 17,729 | 4.48 |
| Democratic | miscellaneous | 423 | 0.11 |
| Total votes | | 396,204 | 100.00 |

Democratic nomination for the Vice President of the United States, 1972:

Vote to replace original candidate Thomas Eagleton, nominated at the 1972 Democratic National Convention and then removed from the ticket

- Sargent Shriver - 2,936 (97.44%)
- Thomas Eagleton - 73 (2.42%)
- Wayne Morse - 4 (0.13%)

United States Senate election in Oregon, 1972
| Party | Candidate | Votes | % |
|---|---|---|---|
| Republican | Mark Hatfield (incumbent) | 488,477 | 53.63 |
| Democratic | Wayne Morse | 421,205 | 46.25 |
| none | miscellaneous | 1,127 | 0.12 |
| Total votes | | 910,809 | 100.00 |
| Republican hold | | | |

== 1974 ==
Democratic primary for the United States Senate from Oregon, 1974
| Party | Candidate | Votes | % |
|---|---|---|---|
| Democratic | Wayne Morse | 155,729 | 48.98 |
| Democratic | Jason Boe | 125,055 | 39.33 |
| Democratic | Robert T. Daly | 21,881 | 6.88 |
| Democratic | Robert E. O'Connor | 14,984 | 4.71 |
| Democratic | miscellaneous | 319 | 0.10 |
| Total votes | | 396,204 | 100.00 |

Note: Morse died before the general election and was replaced on the ballot by Betty Roberts.
