= Venus Trap =

Venus Trap may refer to:

- Venus Flytrap
- The Venus Trap, a 1988 German film starring Sonja Kirchberger
- The Venus Trap (An Inner Sanctum Mystery), a 1966 mystery novel by James Michael Ullman
- Venus Trap, an episode of Garth comic strip
