= Patricia Matthews =

American novelist

Patricia Anne Klein Ernst Brisco Matthews
- Born: Patricia Anne Klein Ernst; July 1, 1927; San Fernando, California, U.S.
- Died: December 7, 2006 (aged 79); Prescott, Arizona, U.S.
- Education: California State University, Los Angeles
- Occupation: Novelist
- Spouse(s): Marvin Owen Brisco (1946–1961); Clayton Hartley Matthews (1972–2004)
- Children: 2
- Writing career
- Pen name: Patricia Ernst, P.A. Brisco, Patty Brisco, Pat A. Brisco, Pat Brisco, Patricia Matthews; Laura Wylie
- Period: 1959–2004
- Genres: Gothic Fiction, Romance, Mystery

Patricia (Anne Klein, née Ernst) Brisco Matthews (July 1, 1927, in San Fernando, California, United States – December 7, 2006, in Prescott, Arizona, United States) was an American writer of gothic, romance and mystery novels. She wrote under the pen names P.A. Brisco, Patty Brisco, Pat A. Brisco, Pat Brisco, Patricia Matthews and Laura Wylie. She collaborated with her second husband, Clayton Matthews, on romance and mystery (suspense) novels; they were called "the hottest couple in paperbacks.".

== Biography ==
Patricia Anne Klein Ernst was born on July 1, 1927, in San Fernando, California, the daughter of Roy Oliver Ernst and Gladys Gable. Her mother enrolled her in the famous Meglin Kiddies school, but she recorded only two of her songs professionally for one demo tape. She studied at California State University, Los Angeles, where she worked as secretary to the General Manager of Associated Students by the California State College.

On 21 December 1946 she married Marvin Owen Brisco, they had two sons: Michael Arvie and David Roy. By 1961, the marriage had ended in divorce. Focused on her writing career, she met the writer Clayton Matthews in a local writers' group. After Matthews divorced his first wife, he and Patricia married on 3 November 1972 and lived near San Diego.

Matthews started to write poetry, juvenile books, a play, fantasy and mystery short stories, which she signed under different names: Patricia Ernst, P.A. Brisco and Pat A. Brisco. Using the names Patty Brisco and Pat Brisco, she wrote gothic novels.

When the market for gothic novels softened, at the suggestion of the Matthews' agent, Jay Garon, she began to write romance novels under her second married name, Patricia Matthews. She and her husband also collaborated on several romance and suspense novels using the pseudonyms Laura Wylie and Laurie Wylie. She and her husband wrote five Casey Farrell mystery novels together, and she wrote three on her own, the Thumbprint Mysteries, set in the American Southwest.

In 1989 they moved to Prescott, Arizona where they were involved in local theater productions and even produced a play of their own. Her husband Clayton died on 25 March 2004. Patricia died on December 7, 2006, in the Brisco family home in Prescott, Arizona.

== Awards ==
- 1983 Reviewers Choice Awards for Best Historical Gothic
- 1986-87 Affaire de Coeur Silver Pen Readers Award

== Bibliography ==
=== As P.A. Brisco ===
==== Single Novel ====
- Harold Jensen's Hope Chest, 1959

=== As Patty Brisco ===
==== Single Novels ====
- Horror at Gull House, 1969
- Merry's Treasure, 1969
- The Crystal Window, 1973
- House of Candles, 1973
- Mist of Evil, 1976
- Raging Rapids, 1978
- Too Much In Love, 1979

=== As Pat A. Brisco ===
==== Single Novels ====
- The Other People, 1970

=== As Pat Brisco ===
==== Single Novels ====
- The Carnival Mystery, 1974
- Campus mystery, 1978

=== As Patricia Matthews ===
==== Hannah Bilogy ====
1. Love's Avenging Heart, 1976
2. Dance of Dreams, 1983

==== Single Novels ====
- Love Forever More, 1977
- Love's Wildest Promise, 1977
- Love's Daring Dream, 1978
- Love's Pagan Heart, 1978
- Love's Golden Destiny, 1979
- Love's Magic Moments , 1979
- Love's Bold Journey, 1980
- Love's Raging Tide, 1980
- Love's Sweet Agony, 1980
- Tides of Love, 1981
- Embers of Dawn, 1982
- Flames of Glory, 1982
- Gambler in Love, 1984
- Tame the Restless Heart, 1985
- Thursday and the Lady, 1987
- Enchanted, 1987
- Mirrors, 1988
- Oasis, 1988
- Sapphire, 1989
- The Dreaming Tree, 1989
- The Death of Love, 1990
- The Unquiet, 1991
- Dead Man Riding, 1999
- Death in the Desert, 1999
- Secret of Secco Canyon, 1998
- Rendezvous at Midnight, 2004

==== Poems ====
- Love's Many Faces, 1979

==== Single novels with Clayton Matthews ====
- Midnight Whispers, 1981
- Empire, 1982
- Midnight Lavender, 1985

==== Casey Farrell Series with Clayton Matthews ====
1. The Scent of Fear, 1992
2. Vision of Death, 1993
3. Taste of Evil, 1994
4. Sound of Murder, 1994
5. Touch of Terror, 1995

==== Anthologies in collaboration ====
- On Wings of Magic, 1994 (with Andre Norton and Sasha Miller)

=== As Laura Wylie ===
==== Single Novel ====
- The Night Visitor, 1979

== References and sources ==
- Patricia Matthews's Webpage in Fantastic Fiction
- Goodbye to Patricia Matthews in Science Fiction & Fantasy Writers of America, Inc. Website
- International Who's Who of Authors and Writers 2004 by Taylor & Francis Group, Elizabeth Sleeman, Alison Neale
