= Alfred Hitchcock's Anthology – Volume 4 =

Alfred Hitchcock's Anthology - Volume 4
- Volume 4 cover
- Author: Eleanor Sullivan
- Original title: Alfred Hitchcock's Tales to Scare You Stiff
- Language: English
- Series: Alfred Hitchcock's Anthology
- Genre: Short Stories, crime fiction, detective fiction
- Publisher: The Dial Press
- Publication date: Spring-Summer, 1979
- Publication place: United States
- Media type: Print (paperback)
- Pages: 352 pp
- Preceded by: AHA: Volume 3
- Followed by: AHA: Volume 5

Alfred Hitchcock's Anthology – Volume 4 is the fourth installment of Alfred Hitchcock's Anthology, one of the many Alfred Hitchcock story collection books; edited by Eleanor Sullivan. Originally published in hardcover as Alfred Hitchcock's Tales to Scare You Stiff in 1978, the book includes 26 short stories and a short novel called The Graveyard Shift by William P. McGivern. Also, within the 26 short stories is The Green Heart by Jack Ritchie which was made into the 1971 film A New Leaf.
