= George Robert Johnston =

Canadian burglar

- Undated photograph of Johnston
- Born: George Robert Johnston c. 1954; Prince Edward Island, Canada
- Died: July 25, 2004 (aged 49–50); Death Valley National Park, California, U.S.
- Cause of death: Suicide by gunshot
- Other name: "Ballarat Bandit"
- Occupations: Drywaller, drug dealer, burglar
- Spouse: Tommi Johnston
- Children: 4

George Robert Johnston (1954 – 2004), better known as the Ballarat Bandit or John Doe #39-04, was a Canadian-born burglar who gained nationwide attention as he spent the last several years of his life hiding from police in Death Valley National Park, California, United States. The nickname of Ballarat Bandit was given to Johnston in accordance to where his criminal career began, inside of the town of Ballarat, California.

== Life before Death Valley ==
George Robert Johnston was born in Prince Edward Island, Canada. He had been employed as a drywaller when he met his wife, Tommi, and they eventually had four daughters. When Tommi developed leukemia, Johnston began to grow and sell marijuana. In 1997, when his activities were discovered, Johnston received a total of eight years in prison (of which he only served a year and a half before being paroled). However, within just weeks of incarceration, he suffered a breakdown from which he never fully recovered. Tommi believes that medication Johnston was given in prison had exacerbated, or possibly caused, his breakdown, which left him unable to support his family. In 2000, Johnston left his family, saying he wished to leave Canada for the U.S., where he would seek help from a faith healer.

== Years at large and death ==
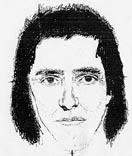
Composite of Johnston while he remained unidentified.

In 2003, Johnston began his criminal career by burglarizing multiple areas of Ballarat, California, for various odd items with which he supported himself, as well as stealing weapons and hiding them inside of his various campsites. Johnston was described as being elusive, and police spent many months attempting to capture him. It was suspected for some time that he might have been a terrorist, or at the very least that he had military training, as his endurance and evasion techniques were rather impressive and foiled the police for months.

Recognizing that he was near capture and unable to face being incarcerated once again, Johnston instead took his own life with a single rifle shot to the head. As police were unable to identify Johnston's body for eighteen months, he was known as John Doe #39-04. Johnston did have a distinctive tattoo, but this did not initially assist with identification. His body was identified by fingerprint identification in 2006 when the coroner thought to send his details to the Royal Canadian Mounted Police (RCMP). Lost to his family for years, his wife and four daughters were devastated at the news, as they had not heard from Johnston since his departure. He was buried in an unmarked grave in a potter's field in San Bernardino, California.

== In media ==
In 2008, Johnston's case was detailed on the TruTV television series, The Investigators, on an episode titled "Lone Fugitive".
