= The Oakdale Affair and The Rider =

Book by Edgar Rice Burroughs

- First book edition of The Oakdale Affair and The Rider
- Author: Edgar Rice Burroughs
- Illustrator: John Coleman Burroughs
- Cover artist: John Coleman Burroughs
- Language: English
- Genre: Novel
- Publisher: Edgar Rice Burroughs, Inc.
- Publication date: 1937
- Publication place: United States
- Media type: Print
- Pages: 172 and 144 p.

The Oakdale Affair and The Rider is a collection of two short novels by American writer Edgar Rice Burroughs. "The Oakdale Affair", a contemporary tale, was written in 1917 under the working title of "Bridge and the Oskaloosa Kid", and is a partial sequel to The Mucker (1914/1916), as Bridge, the protagonist, had been a secondary character in the earlier work. It was first published in Blue Book Magazine in March 1918. "The Rider", a Ruritanian romance, was written in 1915 and first published as "H.R.H. the Rider" as a serial in All-Story Weekly from December 14–18, 1918. The first book publication of the two stories brought them together in one volume as The Oakdale Affair and The Rider, issued by Edgar Rice Burroughs, Inc. in February 1937; the book was reprinted by Grosset & Dunlap in 1937, 1938 and 1940. Both works have since been published separately.

== Contents ==
- The Oakdale Affair
- The Rider

== Copyright ==
The copyrights for the stories in this collection have expired in the United States and thus now reside in the public domain there.
