= Holly Roth =

American novelist

- Born: Helen Marjorie Roth; March 30, 1916; Chicago, Illinois, U.S.
- Disappeared: October 11, 1964 (aged 48); Atlantic Ocean, off Safi, Morocco
- Other name: Helen Holly Roth-Franta
- Education: James Madison High School
- Occupation: Writer
- Spouse: Josef Franta (m. 1960–1964)
- Writing career
- Pen name: P.J. Merrill; K.G. Ballard
- Language: English
- Years active: 1953–1964
- Genres: Spy fiction; detective fiction

Helen Holly Roth-Franta (born March 30, 1916) was an American writer who authored novels and short stories in the genres of spy fiction and detective fiction. She also published works under the pseudonyms P.J. Merrill and K.G. Ballard. Roth published twelve novels in her lifetime and many short stories, one of which was nominated for an Edgar Award.

In 1964, Roth disappeared off the coast of Morocco while sailing on a ketch with her husband and is presumed deceased.

== Early life and education ==
Holly Roth was born Helen Marjorie Roth in Chicago, Illinois, on March 30, 1916, to Benjamin Roemer Roth and Frances Ethel Ballard Roth. Her parents were traveling at the time, and stopped in Chicago for her birth.

Roth was raised in the United States and Europe, primarily between Brooklyn and London, on account of her father's business. She attended a variety of schools in both locations, and was also educated by private tutors. Despite the constant travel, she regarded herself as a New Yorker and graduated from James Madison High School in Brooklyn. Roth attended many colleges before earning a Bachelor of Arts (B.A.). Her first husband died in a train accident.

== Career ==
Roth began her career working as a fashion model before shifting to writing, working as a writer and editor for newspapers and magazines. She contributed to publications such as Cosmopolitan, Seventeen, The American Journal of Surgery and the New York Post.

Roth debuted as an author with two novels serialized in periodicals. Her debut novel, The Content Assignment (1954), was first serialized in condensed form under the title The Girl Who Vanished in the May 16 and May 23, 1953, issues of The Saturday Evening Post. Her third novel, The Sleeper (1955), was first serialized in condensed form under the title Rendezvous with a Traitor in the June 25 and July 9, 1954, issues of Collier's. Roth began writing detective fiction in 1957 with a series of two novels following Detective Inspector Richard Medford: Shadow of a Lady (1957) and Too Many Doctors (1962); the latter novel is set on a ship off the European coast and centers on a young woman who falls overboard and loses her memory. In 1959, she published The Slender Thread under the pseudonym P.J. Merrill. Under the pseudonym K.G. Ballard, she published four detective novels, including Trial by Desire (1960). Roth served as secretary of Mystery Writers of America in the 1950s.

Roth's short story, "Who Walks Behind" (EQMM, September 1965), was nominated for the 1966 Edgar Allan Poe Award for Best Short Story.

== Reception ==
Roth's fiction was reviewed in many publications during her lifetime, but her work is largely considered to be critically overlooked.

Her works were assessed many times in Kirkus Reviews, where The Content Assignment was evaluated as a "catchy lead off to a good lead on." Kirkus praised Roth's "suspense and susceptibility" in their review of The Slender Thread (1959). Kirkus also praised Roth's "smooth handling of more complicated than believable liens and loyalties" in Bar Sinister (1960). Roth's final story, "The Game's the Thing" (1966), was called "a psychological startler that bears a remarkable resemblance to Dr. Berne's interpretations."

In 2011, writing for The Independent, author Christopher Fowler wrote that "if the plots seem far-fetched, her ability to turn up the tension is unquestionable."

== Disappearance ==
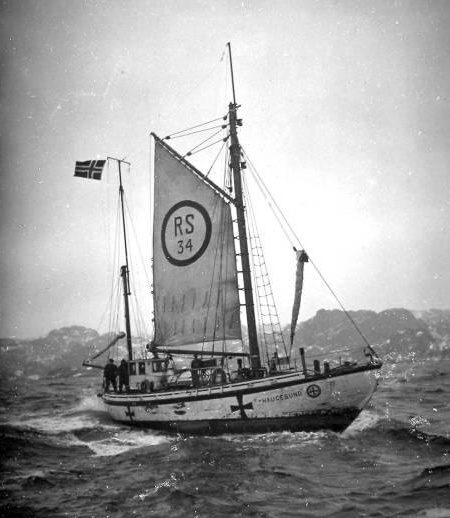
RS 34 sister ship to Visa ex RS 26 Bergens Kreds. Here RS 34 in service during World War 1940-1945.

In 1960, Roth married Josef Franta, a Czechoslovak national who traveled on a Swiss passport. According to her brother Frank, Holly had met Franta in Geneva, where he was working with the International Labour Organization (ILO). The same year, Franta purchased a 47-foot wooden 35 tons ketch named Visa for $8,500. She was built in 1912 in Norway as rescue boat no. 26 RS Bergens Kreds and was built by Brødrene Marcussen, Gjeving, Lyngør to the design of the famous Norwegian boat builder Colin Archer. RS 26's rescue service lasted until 1948 and thereafter sold as a yacht.

Franta later put the vessel into Roth's name, and Roth spent $20,000 on renovations. Frank reports that, while Roth had been living in Paris and Majorca for several years, she lived aboard Visa with her husband during the last year of her life. Frank last saw his sister in 1960, just before the marriage.

In a letter to Frank dated March 30, 1964, Roth wrote that Franta was having difficulty entering the United States, claiming that the Central Intelligence Agency (CIA) was keeping a lengthy blackmail file on him.

Location of Safi in Morocco.

On October 8, 1964, Roth and Franta departed Gibraltar aboard Visa for the Canary Islands. Two days later, Visa ran into a storm at sea. On October 11, Roth disappeared. Franta claimed they were twenty miles north of Safi when, at approximately 4 a.m., a force suddenly shook the boat while Roth was above deck and Franta below, knocking him against the wall. Making his way above deck, Franta saw a 145-foot-long ship sailing away from Visa. He believed he saw a body wearing a life jacket in the water and called out for Roth, receiving no answer. He steered Visa toward the area and threw out a buoy, but the line fouled the propeller. Franta twice tied a line to himself and went into the water to retrieve Roth, but was unsuccessful in both attempts.

Returning to Visa, he fired flares and a gun to attract fishing boats he had seen earlier. He then used the radio and made contact with Radio Safi. Around noon, a Spanish fishing trawler called the Santa Africana hove to, put two men aboard Visa and took her in tow to Safi. Several fishing craft and a Spanish coastal freighter searched the area for where Roth was presumed to have gone overboard. Frank received a copy of Franta's statement along with a "Presumptive Report of the Death of an American Citizen", dated October 15 and signed by Robert G. Adam, the American vice consul in Casablanca. The report lists Roth's cause of death as "accidental, presumed lost at sea and drowned."

On November 23, 1964, a source at the U.S. State Department stated that the investigation into Roth's disappearance had not been closed. On November 25, the Associated Press (AP) reported that Moroccan police had listed her death as accidental and that the inquiry was officially closed. Authorities permitted Franta to leave Morocco at any time, but he stayed in Safi trying to sell Visa. According to Franta, an underwriter estimated the damage to Visa at $5,600. Roth's body has never been found.

Julian Muller of the publishing company Harcourt, Brace & World, a friend of Roth who had been given power of attorney, described Roth as "tall, attractive, a rare person, kindly, imaginative and much beloved by everybody she knew. She had a great love of literature and letters and her speech and writing reflected it. She was a person of broad interests and highly articulate."

== Adaptations ==
Roth's short novel, The Girl Who Saw Too Much (August 1956, The American), was adapted for television by Robert J. Shaw and broadcast on the August 29, 1956, episode of Kraft Television Theatre, starring Betsy Palmer.

A story by Roth was adapted by Jerry Sohl as an episode of General Electric Theater. The episode, titled "So Deadly, So Evil", was broadcast on March 13, 1960. The cast included Ronald Reagan and Peggy Lee.

The Sleeper was adapted by Charles Sinclair as an episode of 77 Sunset Strip. The episode, titled "Genesis of Treason", was broadcast on April 29, 1960.

Her work also appeared on Moment of Fear.

At the time of her death, two of Roth's works had been purchased to be adapted into film, but neither were produced.

== Selected works ==
=== Novels ===
==== as Holly Roth ====
- Roth, Holly (1954). The Content Assignment. New York: Simon and Schuster.
  - "The Girl Who Vanished [Part 1 of 2]". The Saturday Evening Post. Vol. 225, no. 46. Illustrated by Larry Kritcher. May 16, 1953.
  - "The Girl Who Vanished [Part 2 of 2]". The Saturday Evening Post. Vol. 225, no. 47. May 23, 1953.
  - Roth, Holly (1954). The Shocking Secret. New York: Dell Publishing Company.
- Roth, Holly (1954). The Mask of Glass. New York: Vanguard Press.
- Roth, Holly (1955). The Sleeper. New York: Simon and Schuster.
  - "Rendezvous with a Traitor [Part 1 of 2]". Collier's. Vol. 133, no. 13. June 25, 1954. p. 32.
  - "Rendezvous with a Traitor [Part 2 of 2]". Collier's. Vol. 134, no. 1. July 9, 1954. pp. 70–79.
- Roth, Holly (1956). The Crimson in the Purple. New York: Simon and Schuster.
- Roth, Holly (1960). The Van Dreisen Affair. New York: Random House.
- Roth, Holly (1966). Button, Button. New York: Harcourt, Brace & World.

Medford series

- Roth, Holly (1957). Shadow of a Lady. New York: Simon and Schuster.. Also serialised as Shadow of the Lady
- Roth, Holly (1962). Too Many Doctors. New York: Random House.
  - Roth, Holly (1962). Operation Doctors. London: Hamish Hamilton.

==== as K.G. Ballard ====
- Ballard, K.G. (1957). The Coast of Fear. Garden City: Doubleday.
  - Ballard, K.G. (1958). Five Roads to S'Agaro. London: T.V. Boardman.
- Ballard, K.G. (1960). Bar Sinister. Garden City: Doubleday.
- Ballard, K.G. (1960). Trial by Desire. London & NY: T.V. Boardman.
- Ballard, K.G. (1963). Gauge of Deception. Garden City: Doubleday.

==== as P.J. Merrill ====
- Merrill, P.J. (1959). The Slender Thread. New York: Harcourt, Brace and Company.

=== Short fiction ===
- "The Girl Who Saw Too Much". The American. Vol. 162, no. 2. August 1956. p. 101.
  - "The Girl Who Saw Too Much". Ellery Queen's Mystery Magazine. Vol. 55, no. 5. May 1970. pp. 24–61.
  - "The Girl Who Saw Too Much". Ellery Queen's Anthology. No. 31. Spring–Summer 1976. pp. 131–170.
  - "Murder My Shadow". Argosy. Vol. 18, no. 5. May 1957. pp. 104–143.
- "The Fourth Man". Argosy. Vol. 18, no. 10. October 1957. pp. 69–85.
  - "The Fourth Man". Alfred Hitchcock's Mystery Magazine. Vol. 3, no. 1. January 1958.
  - "The Fourth Man". Alfred Hitchcock's Mystery Magazine (UK). No. 5. January 1958.
  - "The Fourth Man". Alfred Hitchcock's Suspense Magazine. Vol. 4, no. 1. September 1958. p. 28.
  - "The Six Mistakes". Ellery Queen's Mystery Magazine. Vol. 35, no. 6. June 1960. pp. 38–54.
  - "The Six Mistakes". Ellery Queen's Anthology. Vol. 35, no. 16. 1969. p. 237.
- "The Cast-Iron Bachelor". Sleuth Mystery Magazine. Vol. 1, no. 1. October 1958. p. 82.
- "They Didn't Deserve Her Death". Ellery Queen's Mystery Magazine. Vol. 32, no. 4. October 1958. pp. 24–28.
  - "They Didn't Deserve Her Death". Ellery Queen's Mystery Magazine (Australia). No. 138. December 1958. p. 108.
  - "They Didn't Deserve Her Death". Ellery Queen's Mystery Magazine (UK). No. 72. January 1959. p. 95.
  - "They Didn't Deserve Her Death". Ellery Queen's Anthology. No. 46. Summer 1983. p. 226.
  - "Vanishing Trick". Suspense. Vol. 2, no. 3. March 1959. p. 26.
- "Eye Witness". Suspense. Vol. 2, no. 10. November 1959. p. 34.
- "The Pursuer". Alfred Hitchcock's Mystery Magazine. Vol. 5, no. 1. January 1960. p. 98.
  - "The Pursuer". Alfred Hitchcock's Anthology. No. 1. 1977. p. 9.
- "As with a Piece of Quartz". Ellery Queen's Mystery Magazine. Vol. 41, no. 4. April 1963. p. 49.
  - "As with a Piece of Quartz". Ellery Queen's Mystery Magazine (UK). No. 127. August 1963. p. 49.
  - "As with a Piece of Quartz". Ellery Queen's Mystery Magazine (Australia). No. 192. October 1963. p. 49.
  - "As with a Piece of Quartz". Ellery Queen's Anthology. No. 19. 1970. p. 127.
- "A Sense of Dynasty". Ellery Queen's Mystery Magazine. Vol. 42, no. 4. October 1963. pp. 139–153.
  - "A Sense of Dynasty". Ellery Queen's Mystery Magazine (UK). No. 133. February 1964. p. 80.
  - "A Sense of Dynasty". Ellery Queen's Mystery Magazine (Australia). No. 198. April 1964. p. 80.
- "The Loves in George's Life". Ellery Queen's Mystery Magazine. Vol. 43, no. 2. February 1964. pp. 75–90.
  - "The Loves in George's Life". Ellery Queen's Mystery Magazine (UK). No. 137. June 1964. p. 52.
  - "The Loves in George's Life". Ellery Queen's Mystery Magazine (Australia). No. 202. August 1964. p. 52.
- "The Spy Who Was So Obvious". Ellery Queen's Mystery Magazine. Vol. 44, no. 4. October 1964. pp. 6–34.
- "Who Walks Behind". Ellery Queen's Mystery Magazine. Vol. 46, no. 3. September 1965. pp. 144–164.
- "The Game's the Thing". Ellery Queen's Mystery Magazine. Vol. 48, no. 5. November 1966. pp. 141–150.

== See also ==
- List of people who disappeared mysteriously at sea
