= List of Ace western double titles =

Ace Books published 250 western Ace doubles between 1952 and 1973 in dos-à-dos format.

== Genres and collectability ==
Ace published science fiction, mysteries, and westerns, as well as books not in any of these genres. Collectors of these genres have found the Ace doubles an attractive set of books to collect, because of the unusual appearance of the dos-à-dos format.

The list given here gives a date of publication; in all cases this refers to the date of publication by Ace, and not the date of original publication of the novels. For more information about the history of these titles, see Ace Books, which includes a discussion of the serial numbering conventions used and an explanation of the letter-code system.

== D Series ==
- D-002 WE William Colt MacDonald Bad Man's Return / J. Edward Leithead Bloody Hoofs (1952)
- D-004 WE Lewis B. Patten Massacre at White River / Walker A. Tompkins Rimrock Rider (1952)
- D-006 WE William E. Vance The Branded Lawman / Nelson C. Nye Plunder Valley (1952)
- D-008 WE Allan K. Echols Terror Rides the Range / Tom West Gunsmoke Gold (1953)
- D-010 WE Leslie Scott The Brazos Firebrand / Gordon Young Hell on Hoofs (1953)
- D-012 WE Dudley Dean Mcgaughy (as Dean Owen) The Man From Boot Hill / Dan J. Stevens Wild Horse Range (1953)
- D-014 WE Paul Evan Lehman Vultures On Horseback / George Kilrain Maverick With A Star (1953)
- D-018 WE J. Edward Leithead The Lead-Slingers / Samuel Peeples (as Brad Ward) The Hanging Hills (1953)
- D-020 WE Roy Manning The Desperado Code / Allan K. Echols Double-Cross Brand
- D-022 WE Bliss Lomax Maverick Of The Plains / Leslie Scott Badlands Masquerader (1953)
- D-024 WE Tom West Vulture Valley / John Callahan The Sidewinders (1953)
- D-028 WE Paul Evans Gunsmoke Kingdom / William E. Vance Avenger From Nowhere (1953)
- D-030 WE George Kilrain South To Santa Fe / Samuel Peeples (as Brad Ward) Johnny Sundance (1953)
- D-034 WE Ken Murray Hellion's Hole / Ken Murray Feud In Piney Flats (1953)
- D-038 WE Bliss Lomax Outlaw River / Louis L'amour (as Jim Mayo) Showdown At Yellow Butte
- D-039 WE Frank Gruber Quantrell's Raiders / Frank Gruber Rebel Road (1953)
- D-042 WE Walker A. Tompkins One Against The Bullet Horde / Charles M. Martin Law For Tombstone (1954)
- D-046 WE Chuck Martin Law From Back Beyond / Roy Manning Vengeance Valley (1954)
- D-048 WE Louis L'Amour (as Jim Mayo) Utah Blaine / Samuel Peeples (as Brad Ward) Desert Showdown (1954)
- D-052 WE William Colt Macdonald Boomtown Buccaneers / Louis L'Amour Crossfire Trail (1954)
- D-056 WE Bliss Lomax Ambush At Coffin Canyon / Dwight Bennett Newton (as Clement Hardin) Hellbent For A Hangrope (1954)
- D-064 WE Paul Evan Lehman Bullets Don't Bluff / Chandler Whipple Under The Mesa Rim (1954)
- D-068 WE Walker A. Tompkins Deadwood / William Hopson Bullet-Brand Empire (1954)
- D-072 WE Ralph R. Perry Night Rider Deputy / Norman A. Fox The Devil's Saddle (1954)
- D-078 WE Nelson Nye The One-Shot Kid / Tom West Lobo Legacy (1954)
- D-086 WE Richard Brister The Shoot-Out At Sentinel Peak / Roy Manning Tangled Trail (1954)
- D-092 WE Burt Arthur The Drifter / Richard Wormser and Dan Gordon The Longhorn Trail (1955)
- D-098 WE Nelson Nye Texas Tornado / Samuel A. Peeples (as Samuel Anthony Peeples) The Lobo Horseman (1955)
- D-106 WE D.L. Bonar Lawman Without A Badge / Lee Floren Four Texans North (1955)
- D-112 WE Frank Castle Border Buccaneers / Harry Sinclair Drago Trigger Gospel (1955)
- D-120 WE John Mcgreevey Bounty Man / Samuel A. Peeples (as Samuel Anthony Peeples) The Call Of The Gun
- D-128 WE William Hopson High Saddle / William E. Vance Way Station West (1955)
- D-134 WE Gene Olsen The Outsiders / Nelson Nye Tornado On Horseback (1955)
- D-138 WE Paul Evan Gunsmoke Over Sabado / T.V. Olsen Haven Of The Hunted (1956)
- D-144 WE Jay Albert The Man From Stony Lonesome / Rod Patterson A Killer Comes Riding (1956)
- D-156 WE Lee Floren Thruway West / Stephen C. Lawrence The Naked Range (1956)
- D-160 WE Karl Kramer Action Along The Humboldt / Michael Carder Decision At Sundown
- D-166 WE Samuel A. Peeples (as Samuel Anthony Peeples) Terror At Tres Alamos / Stuart Brock Whispering Canyon
- D-172 WE Robert J. Steelman Stages South / Ben Smith Johnny No-Name (1956)
- D-180 WE Nelson C. Nye The No-Gun Fighter / Walt Coburn One Step Ahead Of The Posse (1956)
- D-186 WE Ray Hogan Ex-Marshall / Edward Churchill Steel Horizon (1956)
- D-192 WE Roy Manning Beware Of This Tenderfoot / John Callahan Bad Blood At Black Range (1956)
- D-196 WE Walt Coburn The Night Branders / Frank Gruber The Highwayman
- D-204 WE Paul Durst John Law, Keep Out! / Gordon Donalds The Desperate Donigans (1957)
- D-208 WE Glenn Balch Blind Man's Bullets / Barry Cord The Prodigal Gun (1957)
- D-216 WE Barry Cord Savage Valley / William Colt Macdonald Ridin' Through (1957)
- D-220 WE Ray Hogan The Friendless One / John Jakes Wear A Fast Gun (1956)
- D-226 WE Edwin Booth Showdown At Warbird / Samuel A. Peeples Doc Colt (1957)
- D-230 WE Barry Cord Boss Of Barbed Wire / Lee Floren Burn 'Em Out! (1957)
- D-236 WE Edwin Booth Jinx Rider / Ray Hogan Walk A Lonely Trail (1957)
- D-240 WE Wayne C. Lee Broken Wheel Ranch / Tom West Torture Trail (1957)
- D-248 WE Dwight Bennett Newton (as Clement Hardin) Longhorn Law / Ray Hogan Cross Me In Gunsmoke (1957)
- D-252 WE John Callahan The Rawhide Breed / Rod Patterson Prairie Terror (1957)
- D-260 WE Ray Hogan and Matt Slade Land Of The Strangers / Lee Floren The Saddle Wolves (1957)
- D-264 WE Barry Cord Cain Basin / Lee E. Wells Brother Outlaw (1958)
- D-272 WE Lee Floren Riders In The Night / William Hopson Backlash At Cajon Pass
- D-276 WE Barry Cord The Gunsmoke Trail / Tom West Lead In His Fists (1958)
- D-284 WE Barry Cord The Guns Of Hammer / Edwin Booth The Man Who Killed Tex (1958)
- D-288 WE Edwin Booth Trail To Tomahawk / John Callahan Land Beyond The Law
- D-294 WE John H. Latham Bad Bunch Of The Brasada / Walt Coburn Beyond The Wide Missouri (1958)
- D-298 WE Paul Evans Thunder Creek Range / William Vance Outlaws Welcome! (1958)
- D-304 WE Archie Joscelyn River To The Sunset / Ben Smith Trouble At Breakdam (1958)
- D-308 WE Jack M. Bickham Gunman's Gamble / Roy Manning Draw And Die! (1958)
- D-316 WE Rod Patterson A Time For Guns / Barry Cord / Mesquite Johnny (1958)
- D-320 WE Robert Mccaig The Rangemaster / William Hopson The Last Shoot-Out (1958)
- D-328 WE Merle Constiner The Fourth Gunman / Tom West Slick On The Draw (1958)
- D-332 WE Kermit Welles Blood On Boot Hill / Ben Smith Stranger In Sundown (1959)
- D-346 WE Ray Hogan Wanted: Alive! / Barry Cord Sherriff Of Big Hat (1957)
- D-348 WE T.V. Olsen The Man From Nowhere / John L. Shelley The Avenging Gun (1959)
- D-356 WE Paul Durst Kansas Guns / Tom West The Cactus Kid (1958)
- D-360 WE John H. Latham Johnny Sixgun / Barry Cord War In Peaceful Valley (1959)
- D-368 WE Ray Hogan Hangman's Valley / Joseph Gage A Score To Settle (1959)
- D-372 WE Dan Kirby Cimarron Territory / Glenn Balch Grass Greed (1959)
- D-380 WE William Heuman My Brother The Gunman / Barry Cord Concho Valley (1959)
- D-384 WE Louis Trimble Mountain Ambush / Jack M. Bickham Feud Fury
- D-392 WE Tom West Twisted Trail / Archie Joscelyn The Man From Salt Creek (1959)
- D-400 WE Barry Cord Last Chance At Devil's Canyon / Gordon D. Shirreffs Shadow Of A Gunman (1959)
- D-408 WE Edwin Booth Wyoming Welcome / Giles A. Lutz Law Of The Trigger (1959)
- D-412 WE E.A. Alman Ride The Long Night / Gordon D. Shirreffs Apache Butte (1959)
- D-418 WE C.S. Park The Quiet Ones / Tom West Nothing But My Gun (1960)
- D-424 WE Lee Richards Shoot Out At The Way Station / Robert Mccaig Wild Justice (1960)
- D-430 WE William Hopson Born Savage / Ray Hogan The Hasty Hangman (1960)
- D-436 WE Tom West The Phantom Pistoleer / Giles A. Lutz The Challenger (1960)
- D-442 WE Jack M. Bickham Killer's Paradise / Rod Patterson Rider Of The Rincon (1960)
- D-448 WE Lee Floren Pistol-Whipper / Archie Joscelyn (as Al Cody) Winter Range (1960)
- D-450 WE Tom West Side Me With Sixes / Ray Hogan The Ridgerunner (1960)
- D-456 WE Edwin Booth Danger Trail / Edwin Booth The Desperate Dude
- D-462 WE Jack M. Bickham The Useless Gun / John H. Latham The Long Fuse (1960)
- D-470 WE Gene Olsen The Man Who Was Morgan / Ben Smith The Maverick (1960)
- D-476 WE Tom West Double Cross Dinero / Edwin Booth Last Valley (1960)
- D-484 WE Ray Hogan Ambush At Riflestock / Archie Joscelyn (as Al Cody) Dead Man's Spurs (1961)
- D-492 WE William Hopson Winter Drive / Giles A. Lutz The Wild Quarry (1961)
- D-496 WE Steven G. Lawrence With Blood In Their Eyes / Tom West Killer's Canyon (1961)
- D-502 WE Paul Evan Lehman Troubled Range / Archie Joscelyn (as Al Cody) Long Night At Lodgepole (1961)
- D-510 WE Harry Whittington The Searching Rider / Jack M. Bickham Hangman's Territory (1961)
- D-514 WE Gordon D. Shirreffs Hangin' Pards / Gordon D. Shirreffs Ride A Lone Trail (1961)

== F Series ==
- F-103 WE Harry Whittington A Trap For Sam Dodge / Lee Floren High Thunder (1961)
- F-106 WE Brian Garfield Justice At Spanish Flat / Tom West The Gun From Nowhere (1961)
- F-110 WE Ray Hogan Track The Man Down / Lee Wells Savage Range (1961)
- F-116 WE Dwight Bennett Newton (as Clement Hardin) The Lurking Gun / Louis Trimble Deadman Canyon (1961)
- F-120 WE Jack M. Brickham Gunman Can't Hide / John Callahan Come In Shooting (1961)
- F-124 WE Steven G. Lawrence Slattery / Steven G. Lawrence Bullet Welcome For Slattery (1961)
- F-126 WE Edwin Booth The Troublemaker / Ray Hogan A Marshall For Lawless (1962)
- F-128 WE Tom West The Buzzard's Nest / Louis Trimble Siege At High Meadow (1962)
- F-134 WE Rod Patterson A Shooting At Sundust / Gordon D. Shirreffs Tumbleweed Trigger (1962)
- F-138 WE Steven G. Lawrence Walk A Narrow Trail / Steven G. Lawrence A Noose For Slattery (1962)
- F-142 WE L. P. Holmes Wolf Brand / Smoky Pass (1962)
- F-144 WE Brian Garfield (as Frank Wynne) Massacre Basin / Dwight Bennett Newton (as Clement Hardin) The Badge Shooters (1962)
- F-148 WE Harry Whittington Wild Sky / Tom West Dead Man's Double Cross (1962)
- F-150 WE Nelson Nye Hideout Mountain / Rafe (1962)
- F-152 WE Gordon D. Shirreffs Rio Desperado //Voice Of The Gun (1962)
- F-160 WE Ray Hogan New Gun For Kingdom City / The Shotgunner (1962)
- F-164 WE Steven G. Lawrence Longhorns North / Slattery's Gun Says "No" (1962)
- F-172 WE Tom West Battling Buckeroos / Giles A. Lutz Gun Rich (1962)
- F-176 WE Dan J. Stevens Gun Trap At Bright Water / Ray Hogan The Outside Gun (1963)
- F-184 WE Nelson C. Nye Death Valley Slim / The Kid From Lincoln County (1963)
- F-186 WE William O. Turner The High Hander / Louis Trimble Wild Horse Range (1963) (may be misprinted as F-185 on some copies)
- F-196 WE Harry Whittington Dry Gulch Town / Prairie Raiders (1963)
- F-200 WE Tom West Triggering Texan / Brian Garfield (as Frank Wynne) The Big Snow (1963)
- F-208 WE L. P. Holmes Side Me At Sundown / The Buzzards Of Rocky Pass
- F-214 WE Louis Trimble The Man From Colorado / Bill Burchardt The Wildcatters (1963)
- F-224 WE Nelson Nye Bancroft's Banco / The Seven Six-Gunners (1963)
- F-230 WE Tom West Lobo Lawman / Ray Hogan Trail Of The Fresno Kid (1963)
- F-238 WE Stephen Payne Brand Him Outlaw / Gordon D. Shirreffs Quicktrigger (1963)
- F-244 WE Ray Hogan Last Gun At Cabresto / Edwin Booth Valley Of Violence (1962)
- F-250 WE Barry Cord The Masked Gun / Tom West Gallows Gulch (1963)
- F-254 WE Philip Ketchum The Ghost Riders / William Heuman Hardcase Halloran (1964)
- F-260 WE Louis Trimble Trouble At Gunsight / Brian Garfield Trail Drive
- F-264 WE Ben Elliott Contract In Cartridges / Tom West Don't Cross My Line (1964)
- F-272 WE Ray Hogan The Man From Barranca Negra / Stephen Payne No Job For A Cowboy (1964)
- F-276 WE Brian Garfield (as Brian Wynne) Mr. Six Gun / William E. Vance The Wolf Slayer (1964)
- F-284 WE Lin Searles Border Passage / Ben Smith The Homesteader (1964)
- F-292 WE Gordon D. Shirreffs The Hidden Rider Of Dark Mountain / Tom West The Man At Rope's End (1964)
- F-298 WE Nelson Nye Treasure Trail From Tucson / Sudden Country (1964)

== M Series ==
- M-100 WE John Callahan A Man Named Raglan / Barry Cord Gun Junction (1964)
- M-102 WE Ray Hogan Hoodoo Guns / Rod Patterson Trouble At Hangdog Flats (1964)
- M-104 WE Tom West Sidewinder Showdown / Dan J. Stevens Land Beyond The Law
- M-106 WE Reese Sullivan The Blind Trail / Tim Kelly Ride Of Fury (1964)
- M-108 WE Rod Patterson Gunfire Heritage / Wayne C. Lee Warpath West (1965)
- M-110 WE Tom West Bushwack Brand / Merle Constiner Wolf On Horseback (1965)
- M-112 WE Nelson Nye Rogue's Rendezvous / Gun Feud At Tiedown
- M-114 WE Brian Garfield (as Frank Wynne) Lynch Law Canyon / Stephen Payne Stampede On Farway Pass
- M-118 WE Merle Constiner Guns At Q Cross / Tom West The Toughest Town In The Territory (1965)
- M-120 WE Nelson Nye Ambush At Yuma's Chimney / John Callahan Ride The Wild Land (1965)
- M-122 WE Roger G. Spellman Tall For A Texan / William Vance Outlaw Brand (1965)
- M-124 WE Stephen Payne Trail Of The Vanishing Ranchers / Tom West Battle At Rattlesnake Pass (1965)
- M-126 WE Harry Whittington Valley Of Savage Men / Ben Elliott Brother Badman (1965)
- M-128 WE Brian Garfield (as Brian Wynne) The Night It Rained Bullets / Reese Sullivan Nemesis Of Circle A (1965)
- M-130 WE John Callahan Half-Injun, Half-Wildcat / Clement Hardin Outcast Of Ute Bend (1965)
- M-134 WE Tom West Lost Loot Of Kittycat Ranch / Lin Searles Saddle The Wind (1965)
- M-136 WE Ray Hogan Panhandle Pistolero / Nelson Nye The Marshall Of Pioche (1966)
- M-138 WE Brian Garfield (as Frank Wynne) Call Me Hazard / Dean Owens The Rincon Trap (1966)
- M-140 WE Reese Sullivan Deadly Like A .45 / Barry Cord Last Stage To Gomorrah (1966)

== G Series ==
- G-573 WE Tom West Rattlesnake Range / Merle Constiner Top Gun From The Dakotas (1966)
- G-577 WE Roger Spellman Big Man From The Brazos / Ray Hogan Killer's Gun (1966)
- G-579 WE Lee E. Wells Ride A Dim Trail / Louis Trimble Showdown In The Cayuse (1966)
- G-584 WE William E. Vance Son Of A Desperado / Dwight Bennett Newton (as Clement Hardin) The Ruthless Breed (1966)
- G-587 WE Lee Hoffman Gunfight At Laramie / Brian Garfield (as Frank Wynne) The Wolf Pack
- G-591 WE Dan J. Stevens Stage To Durango / Tom West Hangrope Heritage (1966)
- G-596 WE Reese Sullivan The Demanding Land / John Callahan Hackett's Feud (1966)
- G-601 WE John L. Shelley The Return Of Bullet Benton / Ray Hogan The Hellsfire Lawman (1966)
- G-607 WE Merle Constiner Rain Of Fire / Tom West Bitter Brand (1966)
- G-610 WE John L. Shelley The Siege At Gunhammer / Frank Wynee The Lusty Breed (1967)
- G-615 WE Ray Hogan Legacy Of The Slash M / William Vance Tracker (1967)
- G-619 WE Barry Cord Gallows Ghost / Stephen Payne Room To Swing A Loop
- G-622 WE Tom West Showdown At Serano / Dwight Bennett Newton (as Clement Hardin) The Paxman Feud (1967)
- G-633 WE Wayne C. Lee Return To Gunpoint / Dan J. Stevens The Killers From Owl Creek
- G-638 WE Edwin Booth A Time To Shoot / Merle Constiner The Action At Redstone Creek
- G-642 WE Louis Trimble Standoff At Massacre Buttes / Kyle Hollingshead Echo Of A Texas Rifle (1967)
- G-648 WE William Vance The Raid At Crazyhorse / Tom West Crossfire At Barbed M (1967)
- G-659 WE Dwight Bennett Newton (as Clement Hardin) The Oxbow Deed / John Callahan Kincaid (1967)
- G-668 WE Brian Garfield (as Brian Wynne) A Badge For A Badman / Ray Hogan Devil's Butte (1967)
- G-674 WE William Vance No Man's Brand / Merle Constiner Two Pistols South Of Deadwood (1967)
- G-682 WE John Callahan Ride For Vengeance / Tom West Bandit Brand
- G-687 WE Dan J. Stevens Stranger In Rampart / Eric Allen The Hanging At Whiskey Smith
- G-698 WE Ray Hogan Trouble At Tenkiller / Kyle Hollingshead The Franklin Raid (1968)
- G-705 WE Barry Cord The Long Wire / Merle Constiner Killers' Corral (1968)
- G-710 WE Tom West The Face Behind The Mask / Louis Trimble Marshall Of Sangaree (1968)
- G-721 WE Don P. Jenison The Silver Concho / Lee Hoffman Dead Man's Gold (1968)
- G-727 WE John Callahan Tracks Of The Hunter / Clay Ringold Return To Rio Fuego (1968)
- G-732 WE Reese Sullivan The Trouble Borrower / Dwight Bennett Newton (as Clement Hardin) Ambush Reckoning (1968)
- G-742 WE Tom West Write His Name In Gunsmoke / Dean Owen Lone Star Roundup (1968)
- G-747 WE Ray Hogan Killer On The Warbucket / Dean Owen Sage Tower (1968)
- G-755 WE Wayne C. Lee Trail Of The Skulls / Merle Constiner The Four From Gila Bend (1968)
- G-760 WE Reese Sullivan The Vengeance Ghost / X.X. Jones Bronc (1968)
- G-764 WE Louis Trimble West To The Pecos / John Callahan Jernigan (1968)

== Numbered Series ==
- 04612 WE Tom West Bad Blood At Bonita Basin / Tom West Rattlesnake Range (1972)
- 06760 WE C. Hall Thompson The Killing Of Hallie James / Ray Hogan The Bloodrock Valley War (1969)
- 08560 WE Louis Trimble Siege At High Meadow / Tom West The Buzzard's Nest (1973)
- 09135 WE Clay Ringold The Hooded Gun / Sam Bowie Canyon War (1969)
- 10665 WE Giles A. Lutz The Challenger / Tom West The Phantom Pistoleer (1960)
- 11530 WE Louis Trimble The Lonesome Mountains / Dwight Bennett Newton (as Clement Hardin) Colt Wages (1970)
- 11738 WE Dan J. Stevens Hunter's Moon / Tom West Corral This Killer (1973)
- 11785 WE Phillip Ketchum The Cougar Basin War / Louis Trimble Trouble Valley
- 14193 WE Nelson Nye Death Valley Slim /The Kid From Lincoln County
- 14195 WE Kyle Hollingshead Ransome's Debt / Merle Constiner Death Waits At Dakins Station (1970)
- 14265 WE Norman A. Daniels The Plunderers / Tom West Desperado Doublecross (1970)
- 17000 WE Reese Sullivan The Deadly Deputy / Dan J. Stevens The Dry Fork Incident (1969)
- 17235 WE Don P. Jenison South To New Range / Clay Ringold Duel In Lagrima Valley (1970)
- 24925 WE Merle Constiner The Fourth Gunman / Tom West Slick On The Draw
- 27251 WE Barry Cord Gallows Ghost / The Long Wire (1967)
- 27376 WE Tom West Gallows Gulch / The Man At Rope's End (1964)
- 30701 WE Nelson Nye Rogue's Rendezvous / Gun Feud At Tiedown (1965)
- 30850 WE Tom West Black Buzzards Of Bueno / Ben Smith The Guns Of Sonora (1969)
- 31739 WE Edwin Booth Hardesty / Reese Sullivan The Stranger (1972)
- 32718 WE Barry Cord Hell In Paradise Valley / Clay Ringold The Night Hell's Corners Died
- 33460 WE Louis Trimble Wild Horse Range / William O. Turner The High Hander (1963)
- 38500 WE Kyle Hollingshead Ransome's Move / L. L. Foreman Jemez Brand (1971)
- 47200 WE L. L. Foreman Last Stand Mesa / Philip Ketchum Mad Morgan's Hoard (1969)
- 48755 WE Tom West Lobo Of Lynx Valley / Louis Trimble The Ragbag Army (1971)
- 48885 WE Brian Garfield (as Brian Wynne) Gunslick Territory / John Callahan Loner With A Gun (1973)
- 49301 WE Lin Searles Saddle In The Wind / Tom West Lost Loot Of Kittycat Ranch (1965)
- 52035 WE Eric Allen Marshall From Whiskey Smith / Gene Tuttle Imposters In Mesquite
- 53540 WE William E. Vance The Wolf Slayer / Brian Garfield (as Brian Wynne) Mr. Sixgun (1954)
- 57140 WE Ray Hogan New Gun For Kingdom City / The Shotgunner
- 57601 WE Reese Sullivan Nemesis Of Circle A / Brian Garfield (as Brian Wynne) The Night It Rained Bullets (1965)
- 58601 WE Merle Constiner Two Pistols South Of Deadwood / William Vance No Man's Brand
- 60990 WE Reese Sullivan Man On The Run / John Callahan Odds Against The Texan (1971)
- 67580 WE Ray Hogan The Vengeance Gun / L. L. Foreman Powdersmoke Partners (1973)
- 70350 WE Nelson Nye Hideout Mountain / Rafe (1962)
- 71372 WE Louis Trimble The Hostile Peaks / Tom West Renegade Roundup (1969)
- 72260 WE Gordon D. Shirreffs Quicktrigger / Rio Desperado
- 72360 WE John Callahan Ride The Wild Land / Jernigan (1965)
- 72525 WE Brian Garfield (as Frank Wynne) Call Me Hazard / Dean Owen The Rincon Trap (1966)
- 74180 WE Barry Cord Desert Knights / The Running Iron Samaritans (1973)
- 75150 WE Ray Hogan Track The Man Down / Lee. E. Wells Savage Range (1965)
- 75520 WE Tom West Scorpion Showdown / Clay Ringold Reckoning In Fire Valley (1969)
- 75968 WE Nelson Nye Bancroft's Banco / The Seven Six-Gunners (1963)
- 76900 WE Dean Owen The Skull Riders / Merle Constiner The Man Who Shot "The Kid" (1969)
- 77520 WE Barry Cord Gun Boss of Triangle / Wayne C. Lee Son of a Gunman (1973)
- 77910 WE Dwight Bennett Newton (as Clement Hardin) Stage Line To Rincon / Ray Hogan A Man Called Ryker (1971)
- 77925 WE Stephen Payne Stampede On Farway Pass / Brian Garfield (as Frank Wynne) Lynch Law Canyon (1965)
- 79117 WE Tom West Sweetgrass Valley Showdown / Dean Owen Gun Country (1971)
- 79601 WE Roger Spellman Tall For A Texan / Big Man From The Brazos (1965)
- 81861 WE Merle Constiner Guns At Q Cross / Tom West The Toughest Town In The Territory
- 82101 WE Brian Garfield Trail Drive / Louis Trimble Trouble At Gunsight (1964)
- 82190 WE Harry Whittington A Trap For Sam Dodge / Valley Of Savage Men (1965)
- 82435 WE Barry Cord The Coffin Fillers / Don T. Jenison Trouble On Diamond Seven (1972)
- 83360 WE Barry Cord Two Graves For A Lawman / The Deadly Amigos
- 86465 WE Don P. Jenison Zero Hour At Black Butte / Dwight Bennett Newton (as Clement Hardin) Sheriff Of Sentinel (1969)
- 89590 WE L. P. Holmes Smoky Pass / L. P. Holmes Wolf Brand (1962)
