= Alfred Hitchcock's Anthology – Volume 5 =

- First edition
- Author: Eleanor Sullivan
- Original title: Alfred Hitchcock's Tales to Send Chills Down Your Spine
- Language: English
- Series: Alfred Hitchcock's Anthology
- Genre: Short stories, crime fiction, detective fiction
- Publisher: The Dial Press
- Publication date: Fall-Winter, 1979
- Publication place: United States
- Media type: Print (paperback)
- Pages: 348 pp
- Preceded by: AHA: Volume 4

Alfred Hitchcock's Anthology – Volume 5 is the fifth installment of Alfred Hitchcock's Anthology, one of the many Alfred Hitchcock story collection books; edited by Eleanor Sullivan. Originally published in hardcover as Alfred Hitchcock's Tales to Send Chills Down Your Spine in 1979, the book contains 29 short stories by many well-known crime fiction novelists.

== Contents ==
- A Bottle of Wine (1956) by Borden Deal
- The Glass Bridge (1957) by Robert Arthur
- Luck is No Lady (1957) by Robert Bloch
- The Exit was a Wall (1958) by Evans Harrington
- An Interlude for Murder (1958) by Paul Tabort
- Peephole (1959) by Henry Slesar
- Death Overdue (1959) by Eleanor Daly Boylan
- The Best-Friend Murder (1959) by Donald E. Westlake
- Man Bites Dog (1960) by Donald Honig
- Go to Sleep, Darling (1960) by James Holding
- Murder is Dominant (1961) by Glenn Andrews
- A Reform Movement (1961) by Donald Martin
- Remote Contraol (1962) by Jean Garris
- The Bond (1962) by Bob Bristow
- The Seeing Eye (1963) by Warren Donahue
- Never Trust an Ancestor (1963) by Michael Zuroy
- Anyone for Murder? (1964) by Jack Ritchie
- Death by Misadventure (1965) by Wenzell Brown
- With a Smile for the Ending (1966) by Lawrence Block
- Don't Hang Up (1967) by Michael Wilson
- Another War (1967) by Edward D. Hoch
- Pressure (1968) by Roderick Wilkinson
- The Running Man (1968) by Bill Pronzini
- Sparrow on a String (1969) by Alice Scanlan Reach
- The Clock is Cuckoo (1969) by Richard Deming
- Esther's Dress (1970) by Donald Olson
- A Gallon of Gas (1971) by William Brittain
- Night of the Twisters (1972) by James Michael Ullman
- Variations on a Game (1973) by Patricia Highsmith
