= Alfred Hitchcock's Anthology =

Magazine of short, mysteries (stories)

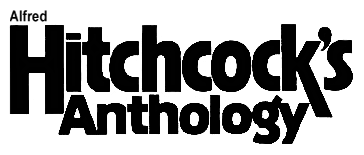
- Categories: Crime fiction, detective fiction
- Frequency: Seasonally
- Founded: 1977
- Final issue Number: 1989; Volume 27
- Company: Davis Publications (paperback); Dial Press (hardcover)
- Country: United States
- Based in: New York, NY
- Language: English
- OCLC: 2985567

Alfred Hitchcock's Anthology (AHA) was a seasonally printed collection of suspenseful and thrilling short stories reprinted from Alfred Hitchcock's Mystery Magazine. Produced from 1977 to 1989, the anthology contains stories from authors such as: Patricia Highsmith, Robert Bloch, Bill Pronzini, Isaac Asimov, and Lawrence Block. The anthology is marketed as everything you would "expect from the Master of Suspense", though Hitchcock never had any direct involvement with the publications.

== Selected volumes ==
- Alfred Hitchcock's Anthology – Volume 1
- Alfred Hitchcock's Anthology – Volume 2
- Alfred Hitchcock's Anthology – Volume 3
- Alfred Hitchcock's Anthology – Volume 4
- Alfred Hitchcock's Anthology – Volume 5
