= Alfred Hitchcock's Anthology – Volume 2 =

Alfred Hitchcock's Anthology - Volume 2
- First edition
- Author: Eleanor Sullivan
- Original title: Alfred Hitchcock's Tales to Take Your Breath Away
- Language: English
- Series: Alfred Hitchcock's Anthology
- Genre: Short Stories, crime fiction, detective fiction
- Publisher: The Dial Press
- Publication date: 1977
- Publication place: United States
- Media type: Print (hardcover)
- Pages: 384 pp
- Preceded by: AHA: Volume 1
- Followed by: AHA: Volume 3

Alfred Hitchcock's Anthology – Volume 2 is the second installment in the Alfred Hitchcock's Anthology series. Originally published in hardcover as Alfred Hitchcock's Tales to Take Your Breath Away in 1977, this issue contains 29 stories from Alfred Hitchcock's Mystery Magazine that, by the editors, were believed to be the best published the preceding year (1977).
