= List of countries by health insurance coverage =

A list of countries by health insurance coverage. The table lists the percentage of the total population covered by total public and primary private health insurance, by government/social health insurance, and by primary private health insurance, including 34 members of Organisation for Economic Co-operation and Development (OECD) member countries.

Percentage of total population covered by
(OECD data from 2016)

Rank	Country	Total public and primary private health insurance	Government / social health insurance	Primary private health insurance
1	Australia	100.0	100.0	0.0
1	Canada	100.0	100.0	0.0
1	Czech Republic	100.0	100.0	0.0
1	Denmark	100.0	100.0	0.0
1	Finland	100.0	100.0	0.0
1	Greece	100.0	100.0	0.0
1	Hungary	100.0	100.0	0.0
1	Iceland	100.0	99.5	0.5
1	Ireland	100.0	100.0	0.0
1	Israel	100.0	100.0	0.0
1	Italy	100.0	100.0	0.0
1	Japan	100.0	100.0	0.0
1	South Korea	100.0	100.0	0.0
1	New Zealand	100.0	100.0	0.0
1	Norway	100.0	100.0	0.0
1	Portugal	100.0	100.0	0.0
1	Slovenia	100.0	100.0	0.0
1	South Africa	100.0	84.0	16.0
1	Sweden	100.0	100.0	0.0
1	Switzerland	100.0	100.0	0.0
1	United Kingdom	100.0	100.0	0.0
22	Austria	99.9	99.9	0.0
22	France	99.9	99.9	0.0
22	Germany	99.9	89.3	10.7
22	Netherlands	99.9	99.9	0.0
22	Spain	99.9	99.9	0.0
27	Turkey	99.5	99.5	0.0
28	Belgium	99.0	99.0	0.0
29	India	98.4	90.6	7.8
30	Chile	98.0	80.0	18.0
31	Luxembourg	97.2	97.2	0.0
32	Slovakia	94.5	94.5	0.0
33	Estonia	94.1	94.1	0.0
34	Poland	91.5	91.5	0.0
35	United States	91.2	36.3	54.9
36	Mexico	90.2	90.2	0.0
37	Algeria	90.0	90.0	0.0
38	Jordan	55.0	43.8	11.1
39	Paraguay	27.0	20.0	7.0

== Charts ==
Expand the charts to see the breakdown:

- "Government/compulsory": Government spending and compulsory health insurance.
- "Voluntary": Voluntary health insurance and private funds such as households’ out-of-pocket payments, NGOs and private corporations.
- They are represented by columns starting at zero. They are not stacked. The 2 are combined to get the total.
- At the source you can run your cursor over the columns to get the year and the total for that country.
- Click the table tab at the source to get 3 lists (one after another) of amounts by country: "Total", "Government/compulsory", and "Voluntary".

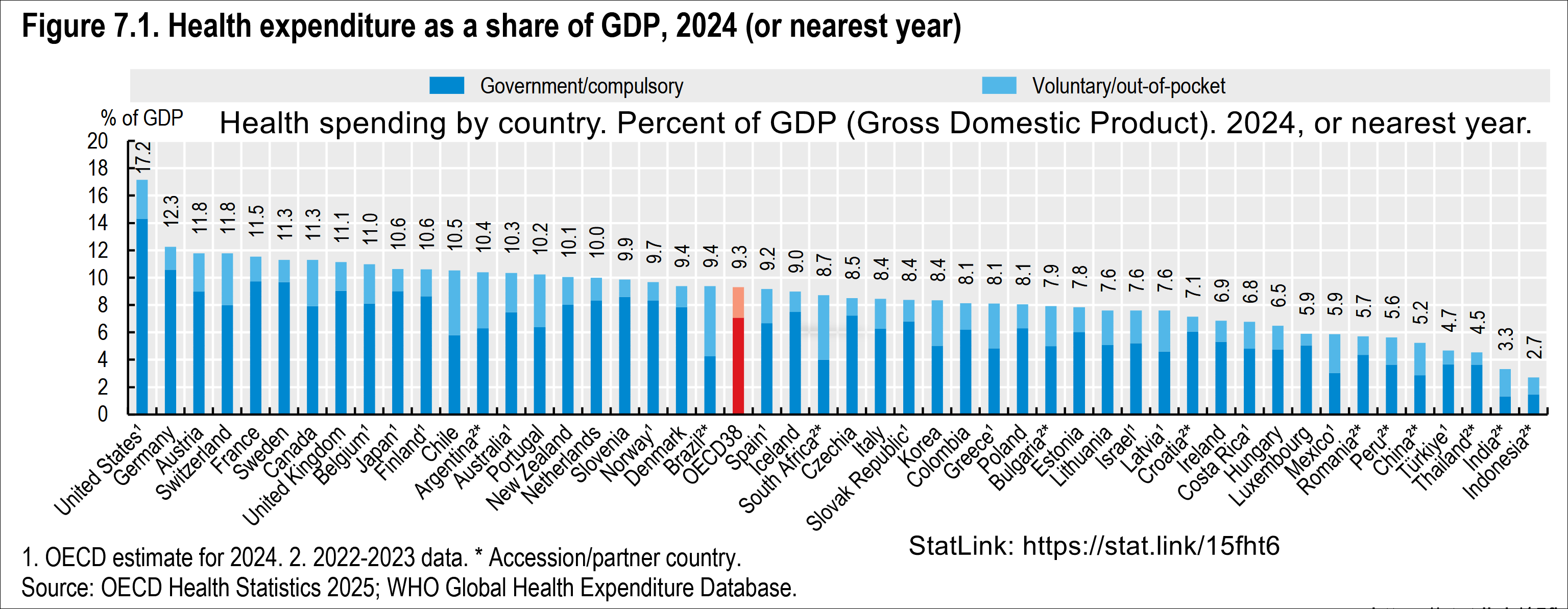
Health spending by country. Percent of GDP (Gross domestic product). For example: 11.2% for Canada in 2022. 16.6% for the United States in 2022.

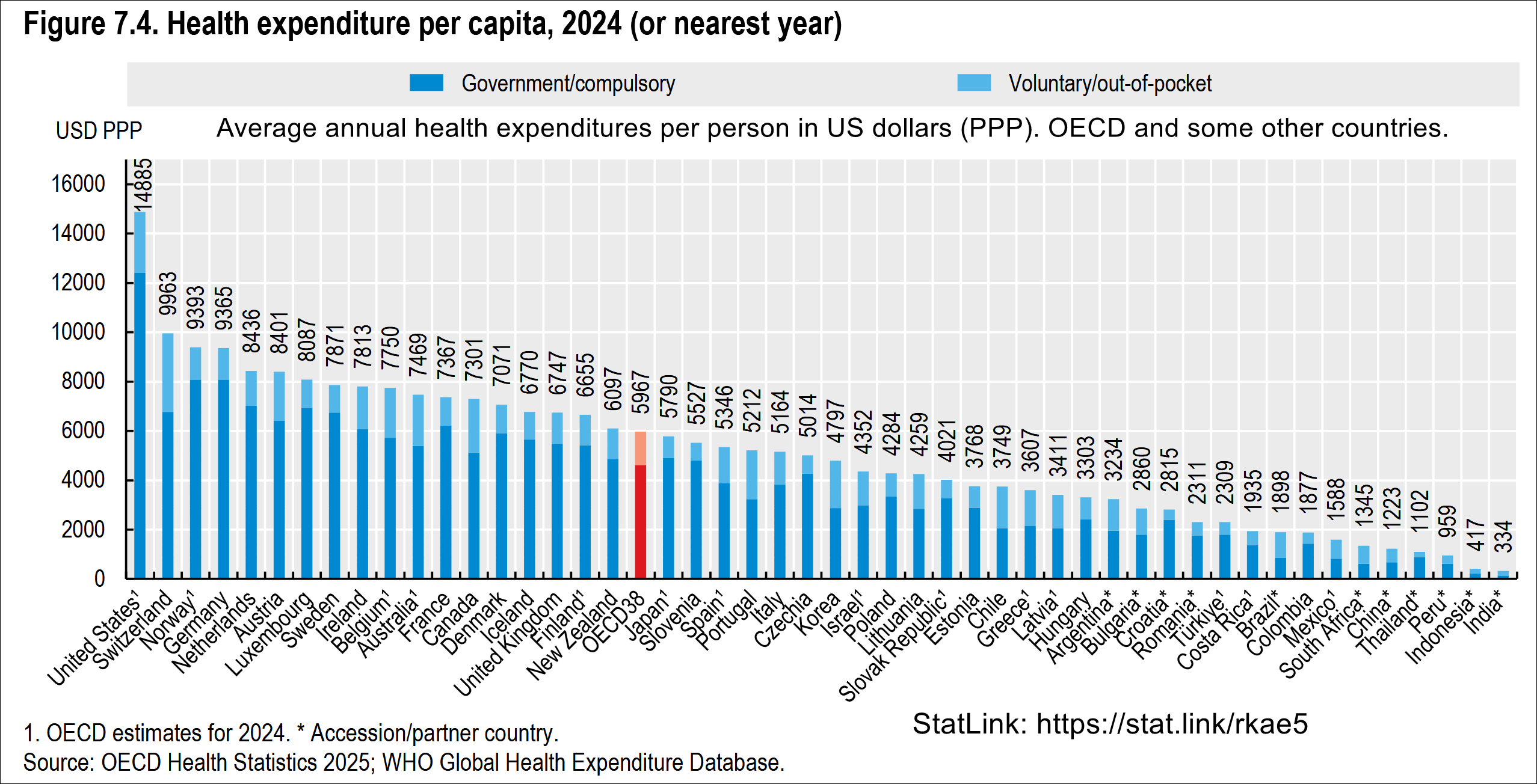
Total healthcare cost per person. Public and private spending. US dollars PPP. For example: $6,319 for Canada in 2022. $12,555 for the US in 2022.

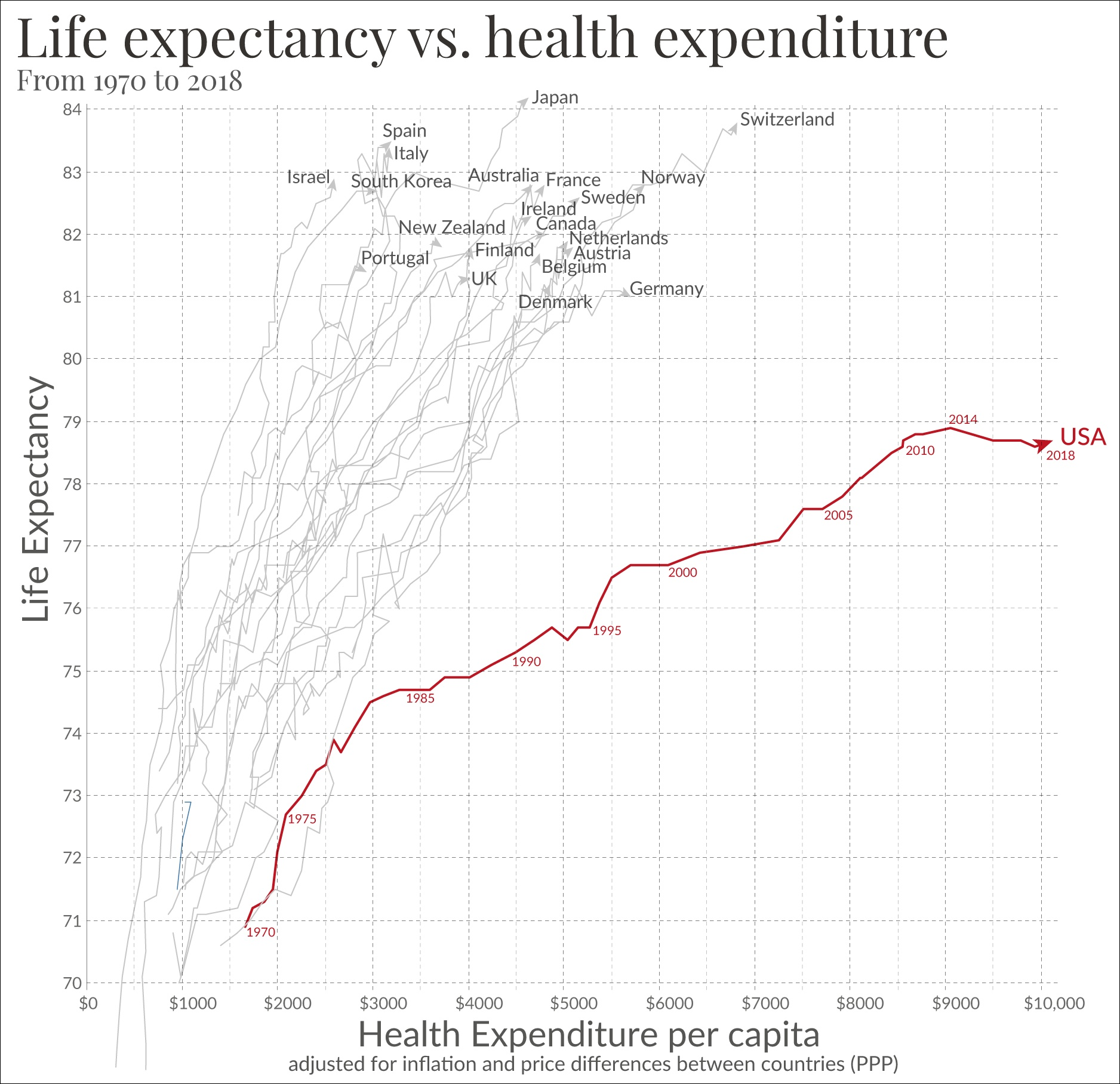
Life expectancy vs healthcare spending of rich OECD countries. US average of $10,447 in 2018.
