= The Rider (novel) =

Novel by Edgar Rice Burroughs

- First independent book edition.
- Author: Edgar Rice Burroughs
- Cover artist: Frank Frazetta
- Language: English
- Genres: Novel
- Publisher: Ace Books
- Publication date: December 1918
- Publication place: United States
- Media type: Print
- Pages: 154

The Rider is a short Ruritanian romance by American writer Edgar Rice Burroughs. It was written in 1915 and first published as "H.R.H. the Rider" as a serial in All-Story Weekly from December 14–28, 1918. Its first book publication paired it with an unrelated tale, The Oakdale Affair, in The Oakdale Affair and The Rider, issued by Edgar Rice Burroughs, Inc. in February 1937 and subsequently reprinted by Grosset & Dunlap in 1937, 1938, and 1940. The story's first independent book publication was in a paperback edition from Ace Books in October 1974.

== Plot summary ==
The kingdoms of Margoth and Karlova, age-old rivals, negotiate a marriage alliance between royal heirs Princess Mary of Margoth and Crown Prince Boris of Karlova. Each resists the idea of wedding a hereditary enemy. Meanwhile, in America, lovers Gwendolyn Bass and Hemmington Main find their matrimonial hopes thwarted by Gwendolyn's mother, who dreams of her daughter marrying into European nobility. Mrs. Bass takes Gwendolyn to Europe with this project in mind. Her husband, the wealthy Abner Bass, who does not share her lofty ambitions, encourages Hemmington to follow.

Boris's father King Constans has him confined to his quarters for his rebellious attitude, but the prince escapes, planning to rendezvous with friends at Peter's Inn, a disreputable establishment he often visits incognito. On the way he is waylaid by the Rider, a notorious highwayman. Boris turns the tables and captures the brigand, whom he takes on to the inn to impress his friends. The Rider, whose cronies also habituate the inn, is agreeable to this, hoping to revenge himself on his captor.

At the inn, Boris meets his friends, officers of the Karlovian army's crack Black Guard. The Rider, seeing his own confederates there, calls on them to free him, but they are overcome by the guardsmen. The barmaid Bakla, hearing the prince's true name mentioned, prevents one of the customers from shooting him. Boris magnanimously invites his late foes to supper. On hearing the Rider's tales of adventure, he envies the brigand's life; the Rider, for his part, envies the prince's. Impulsively, Boris suggests they exchange identities for a week. The Rider can travel in his stead to Margoth in his place to woo his unwanted intended while he himself lives the romantic life of the highwayman. The guardsmen object, fearing his joke will lead to war, but Boris, though personally inclined to peace, is willing to risk it to avoid wedding Princess Mary.

Boris's friends accompany the disguised Rider to the Margothian capital of Demia, where Princess Mary, in cahoots with her nurse Carlotta, is herself plotting to get out of the proposed marriage. The unmannerly Rider commits a social faux pas in the town which alienates the populace. Hemmington Main, drinking in a hotel with a chance acquaintance, witnesses the disturbance. He and his drinking partner, who calls himself Kargovitch, become friendly. Main learns that while he is in Margoth to seek his love, the other has come to avoid one. Kargovitch suggests they help each other further their goals. Gwendolyn and her mother enter the hotel, and Main remarks that if he can only separate the two, he can wed Gwendolyn immediately. Kargovitch comes up with a plan to make it happen.

In the palace, the phony prince disgraces himself by his boorishness, but gets through the all-important meeting with King Alexis. His encounter with Mary, who has made herself up to appear old and ugly to repel her suitor, goes less well. Unfortunately, her subterfuge kindles her father's wrath against her, making him all the more determined on the marriage. The rebellious Mary seizes the first opportunity to slip from the palace.

Learning that Gwendolyn, with whom she went to school, is in Margoth, Mary meets her incognito at the Royal Hotel. Outside, a stranger approaches her car and asks the chauffeur if it is that of the Bass family. To keep the princess's cover from being blown the driver pretends it is. Later Prince Boris, in his new role as the Rider, stops the car. Sending the chauffeur back to Demia on his own horse, he drives off with Mary and Carlotta. Mary, finding she has been mistaken for Gwendolyn, does not enlighten her captor. She marvels at the highwayman's surprising good manners. Later the car is abandoned, and the three continue to the Rider's hideout on foot.

Meanwhile, the true Rider, disenchanted with his royal masquerade, pleads food poisoning as an excuse to go back to Karlova. One of his minders manages to insult King Alexis by implying that the prince's distaste for Mary is the true reason for his early departure, whereupon the king finally reveals his own negative opinion of the prince. When Mary's escape is uncovered Alexis is initially unconcerned, as he no longer favors the marriage. But when the princess's chauffeur returns with the news she has been kidnapped by the Rider, he quickly orders a large party of the Guard out in pursuit.

Meanwhile, the true car of the Bass family has broken down on the highway, where it is encountered by the phony Prince Boris, who is bound for the true prince's hunting lodge to re-exchange identities with the latter. Recognizing the party and knowing of the Bass fortune, the Rider offers them a lift to Sovgrad in Karlova. His minders concur to maintain the pretense he is the prince. Revealing to the Basses his distaste for Princess Mary, the "prince" intimates he might look more favorably on Gwendolyn as a bride. Gwendolyn is not happy, but her mother is ecstatic, and readily agrees to an immediate ceremony at the hunting lodge. Stopping briefly at Peter's Inn, the Rider tells Peter, the proprietor, to send a priest on to the lodge. But no sooner has the innkeeper sent for the priest than an unknown foreigner (Hemmington Main) shows up with one already in tow. He shows Peter a note from the Rider commanding him to take them to the lodge, no questions asked. Peter thinks it odd for the priest to appear so soon, but complies. At the lodge Main encounters the Basses and the phony prince. He is surprised to see the latter, having expected to meet his friend Kargovitch. Main and the "prince" discover they both share the goal of marrying Gwendolyn, whereupon the "prince" draws a gun on Main. Main does the same; they fire, and the "prince" falls. Mrs. Bass cries out that he has killed the crown prince of Karlova.

Meanwhile, the real Prince Boris, as the Rider, finally gets Princess Mary and Carlotta, whom he still thinks are Gendolyn and her mother, to the bandit's camp. The prince and princess both feel attracted to each other, but conceal it. Asked how much he expects for their ransom, Boris tells them his price is that "Miss Bass" marry Hemmington Maine. To his surprise, she does not appear pleased at the prospect. Larger concerns soon loom, however. One of the true Rider's men present in the camp, having overheard the conversation, slips out to inform his fellow bandits. Loath to lose a potentially lucrative ransom, they revolt against their ostensible leader, besieging him and the Basses in the hut. Mary is mystified why the "Rider" would protect the women against his own men, but helps him hold off the bandits. Finally, when the defenders face defeat, Boris confesses his love for her. At this point the Margothian Guard appear and defeat the bandits. Boris now discovers for the first time that his captive is Princess Mary, but he continues to conceal his own identity, and is arrested as the Rider. Mary attempts to protect him as he had protected her, but to little avail. The three are returned to the capital, and where Boris is cast into prison.

On witnessing the apparent death of "Prince Boris," the priest who came with Hemmington Main flees to take the news to Karlova. In his wake, innkeeper Peter's henchman and the priest he was sent for arrive. Aware of the false prince's true identity, and realizing he is only wounded, not dead, they spirit him off, to the confusion of those remaining. Mrs. Bass, still believing her ambition has led to tragedy, reconciles herself to Main and his suit, and suggests they escape to Margoth. But Margoth proves no refuge: there the supposed assassination of Prince Boris of Karlova and its possible connection to the abortive abduction of Princess Mary of Margoth by the Rider are all over the newspapers, and Main and the Basses are arrested and separated.

Main finds himself in the same cell as his erstwhile friend Kargovitch (actually Prince Boris). Comparing notes on their adventures, they are at a loss on how they managed to confuse the parties of the Basses and Princess Mary, though the rest seems plain enough: Main will die for assassinating "Prince Boris" and Kargovitch for kidnapping the princess. Kargovitch is torn; if he reveals his secret, he might secure their freedom, but probably at the cost of war between Karlova and Margoth—and his own humiliation as perpetrator of a cruel joke against the princess he rejected—with whom he is now in love!

Meanwhile, the Rider, nursed by Bakla at Peter's Inn, also receives the news. While sorry for his impersonator's predicament, he understandably feels unable to do anything about it. Bakla, however, is of another mind, and leaves at once for the Karlovan capital.

In Margoth Princess Mary secures the release of Mrs. Bass and Gwendolyn. Main initially remains incarcerated as the reputed assassin of the prince of Karlova, but then King Alexis mysteriously decides to free him as well. Main pleads for Kargovitch's life with the princess; she, moved as well by her own feelings for him, does the same with her father. But King Alexis is adamant, stating he has already shown the Rider clemency by commuting his hanging sentence to death by firing squad. Later Mary visits Kargovitch in his cell, and they confess their love for each other. She begs him to save his life by revealing his secret, whatever it may be—she has learned of its existence from Main. He tells her he cannot, and she leaves in despair.

The next morning Kargovitch is removed from his cell to be shot, but before the execution can take place it is stopped, and he is whisked to the palace. There he is astonished to find his father, King Constans of Karlova, awaiting him. Having been told everything about the double imposture and the ensuing misadventures by Bakla, Constans had come to Margoth and intervened with Alexis. The charade of the execution had been allowed to proceed almost to the end in order to teach Boris a lesson. After a general reconciliation, Prince Boris meets Princess Mary and they pledge their love anew, and the hoped-for peace between their countries is cemented. Hemmington Main and Gwendolyn Bass marry. And the Rider? The author rhetorically asks his readers if they would like him to say the highwayman reformed and wed Bakla, teasingly says he will say so, and then blandly states that it is not the truth.

== Copyright ==
The copyright for the story has expired in the United States and thus now resides in the public domain there.
