= John H. Latham =

American author

John H. Latham, also known by his pen name Long John Latham, was an American author, editor, magazine publisher, and Western pulp fiction writer primarily active from the 1940s through the 1970s. He is best known for founding and editing a series of popular hobbyist and treasure-hunting magazines, including Long John Latham's True Treasure, Treasure World, Bottles and Relics, and Western Magazine, on folklore, hidden treasures, antiques, relics, and Western-themed content.

== Initial articles and pulp fiction ==
Latham began as the editor of UT Austin's Texas Ranger magazine. After graduating, Latham published often in Western magazines of the time. Some of his stories include Panhandle Purgatory (1943), Smoke Those Traitors Down (1947), and The Gun-Pack Runs Tonight (1948). He also wrote under the pseudonym Tom Brand, authoring Johnny-Behind-the-Gun (1970).

== Magazines ==
In April 1954, Latham and his wife Jean launched their own magazine, initially titled Offshore Operations, from their kitchen table in Conroe, Texas. They funded the venture with approximately US$2,900 and printed 300 copies of the debut issue—erroneously dated 2054—selling them for 50¢ each. Under the Long John Latham name, after founding True Treasure Publications he launched multiple enthusiast publications in the 1960s and 1970s:

- Long John Latham's Lost Treasure, covering buried treasure lore, metal detecting, prospecting how‑tos, and historical tales. This was later rebranded to Long John Latham's True Treasure.
- Long John Latham's Treasure World, a continuation of the treasure-themed series.
- Long John Latham's Bottles and Relics, focusing on antiques, bottles, and relic collecting.
- Long John Latham's Western Magazine, offering western fiction and features.

Many of these publications continued under different names after being sold.

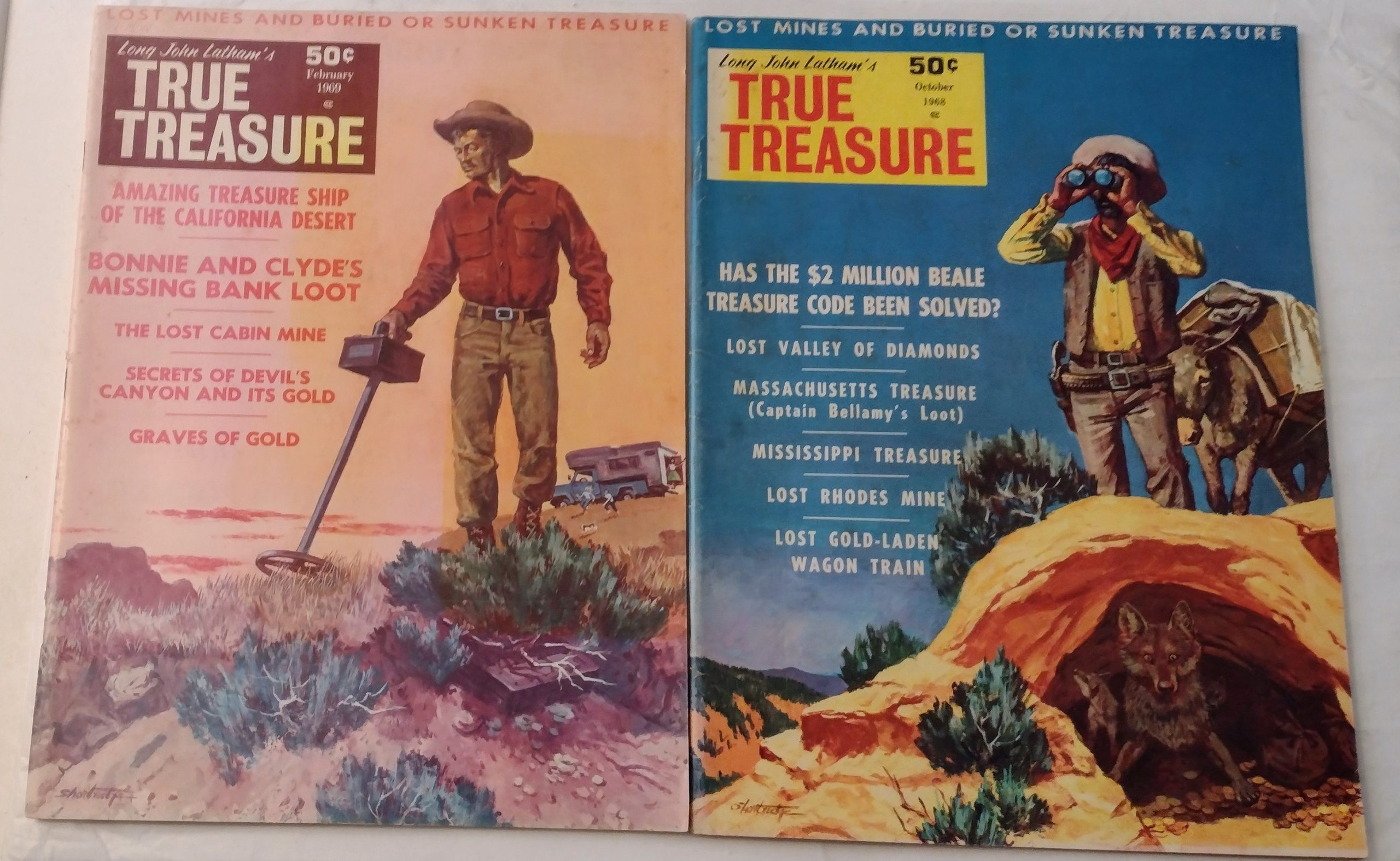
Covers of Long John Latham's True Treasure Magazine from 1968 and 1969.

== Novels and novellas ==
Latham was a writer of mid-century western fiction. In the 1950s and 1960s, Latham contributed several titles to the popular Ace Double paperback series, including Bad Bunch of the Brasada (1958, Ace Double D-294), Johnny Sixgun (1959, D-360), and The Long Fuse (1960, D-462). His longer works include Lonesome Longhorn (1951), which was awarded the Cokesbury Bookstore Award for Best Children’s Book by the Texas Institute of Letters and The Meskin Hound (1958).

== Personal life ==
John Latham was married to Eugenia 'Jean' Latham, his co-publisher and the magazines' chief of finance and had two daughters, Lynn Marie Latham, an American television writer and showrunner, and Susan Lynette Latham, a quantum physicist and aspiring writer, killed in 1981.
