= Nedra Tyre =

American novelist

Nedra Tyre (October 6, 1912 – 1990) was an American social worker and author, specializing in crime fiction.

A native of Offerman, Georgia, Tyre attended Emory University and the Richmond School of Social Work. She had professional stints as a librarian, clerk, and advertising copy writer, in addition to her fiction and social work. Her book reviews appeared in The Richmond News Leader and The Atlanta Journal.

Tyre died in Richmond, Virginia in 1990.

== Selected bibliography ==
- Mouse in Eternity (Knopf, 1952)
- Death of an Intruder (Knopf, 1953)
- Journey to Nowhere (Knopf, 1954)
- Hall of Death (Simon and Schuster, 1960)
- Everyone Suspect (Macmillan, 1964)
- Twice So Fair (Random House, 1971)
- Reflections on Murder: Selected Short Stories of Nedra Tyre (Stark House, 2024)
