= Peter Germano =

American author

Peter B. Germano
- Born: Pietro Baptisto Germano; May 17, 1913; New Bedford, Massachusetts
- Died: September 20, 1983 (aged 70); Wildwood, California
- Occupations: Author; Screenwriter
- Spouse: Muriel Clara Garant (June 6, 1921 - December 19, 2004)
- Writing career
- Pen name: Barry Cord, James Kane, Jack Slade, Jackson Cole, Clay Turner, Jack Bertin
- Genre: Western fiction

Peter Baptisto Germano (May 17, 1913 – September 20, 1983) was an American author of short stories, novels, and television scripts. He began his career with short stories. He wrote articles documenting the Marines in World War II as a combat correspondent. He wrote novels, most of which were westerns, but also wrote science fiction. And as television became ever-present in American culture, Germano wrote numerous television scripts for western, science fiction, drama, and cartoon series.

== Biography ==
=== Early life ===
Germano was born in New Bedford, Massachusetts, the eldest of six children. His parents, Italian immigrants from the town of Cigliano, gave him the name Pietro Baptisto Germano, which became Peter B. early in his life. As a young man, he worked several jobs, including as a clerk for the local railroad. It was during his employment at the local train station that he met his wife, Muriel Garant. She was an actress and model who worked in theater on Cape Cod but took a job at the railroad station in New Bedford, Massachusetts, during World War II. The couple married in February 1943, just before Germano left to serve in the Pacific Theater during World War II. He had a few short stories published in magazines before his tour of duty.

=== World War II ===
As a war correspondent for the United States Marine Corps, Germano wrote numerous articles that appeared in various newspapers. After the war, Peter and Muriel lived in Chicago until he was called to serve in the Korean War in 1950. A few years later, the family settled in Anaheim, California (within walking distance to the newly opened Disneyland). Germano and his wife raised four children, while he began a successful writing career.

=== Education ===
Throughout his military career and his work as a writer, Germano went to college and earned two degrees. With only two years of high school, he attended Brown University in Providence, Rhode Island, from 1946 to 1950. After his service in the Korean War, Germano transferred to Chapman College in Orange, California, in 1956 and received a B. A. in 1959. In 1968, he attended Loyola Marymount University, where he earned his Master of Arts in 1970. From 1971 to 1973, Germano was a part-time lecturer at Loyola Marymount, where he taught Advanced Writing for Film and Television to graduate students.

=== Novels and television ===
With his transition from military to civilian life complete, Germano worked tirelessly on the bulk of his fiction career. He wrote western novels under several pseudonyms and, in the 1950s and 1960s, wrote television scripts for several western and science fiction programs. With a steady career, the family moved in 1966 to a new suburban home in Thousand Oaks, California, located north of Los Angeles in Ventura County. By the 1970s, he had published a science fiction novel, mystery short stories, and western short stories for the Jim Hatfield series in "Texas Rangers".

Germano collaborated with his wife, Muriel, on several projects. In the 1970s, he became the associate editor of The Californian, the newspaper of the Golden State Mobilehome Owners League. When the newspaper's editor, Thomas Thompson, retired, Germano and his wife took over as editors, a position they held for eight years. During this same time period, with grandchildren visiting often, the couple wrote scripts for several animated cartoons televisions series, including The Little Prince.

=== Memberships ===
A strong supporter of union labor, Germano was a member of the Writers Guild of America, West. He also held memberships in the Western Writers of America (which published "The Roundup" from the University of Texas at El Paso), the Academy of Television Arts and Sciences, and the Marine Corps Combat Correspondents Association.

=== Death ===
Germano died in 1983. When not writing, he hiked the golden hills of California. His ashes were spread in the hills near Thousand Oaks. Memorials for both Peter and Muriel Germano are located in Simi Valley's Assumption Cemetery, the local Catholic cemetery.

== Filmography ==
=== Television ===
Year	TV Series	Credit	Notes
1958-62	Cheyenne	Writer	5 Episodes
1959	Wanted: Dead or Alive	Writer	1 Episode
1960-61	The Rebel	Writer	3 Episodes
1960-62	Tales of Wells Fargo	Writer	6 Episodes
1961	Zane Grey Theatre	Writer	1 Episode
1961	Bronco	Writer	1 Episode
1961	Maverick	Writer	2 Episodes
1961-64	Wagon Train	Writer	11 Episodes
1962	The New Breed	Writer	1 Episode
1962	The Rifleman	Writer	1 Episode
1963	The Dakotas	Writer	2 Episodes
1963	The Virginian	Writer	1 Episode
1963-64	The Fugitive	Writer	2 Episodes
1966	The Time Tunnel	Writer	1 Episode
1966-67	Iron Horse	Writer	3 Episodes
1967	Voyage to the Bottom of the Sea	Writer	1 Episode
1967	Hondo	Writer	1 Episode
1968-69	Bonanza	Writer	2 Episodes
1969	The Guns of Will Sonnett	Writer	1 Episode
1974	Valley of the Dinosaurs	Writer	
1976	Land of the Lost	Writer	1 Episode
1977	The Life and Times of Grizzly Adams	Writer	1 Episode
1978	Battle of the Planets	Writer	
1978	The Adventures of the Little Prince	Writer	
1978	The Next Step Beyond	Writer	1 Episode

== Novels ==
pseudonym	genre	title	year	publisher	comment
Barry Cord	WE	Trail Boss From Texas	1948
Barry Cord	WE	The Gunsmoke Trail	1951
Barry Cord	WE	Shadow Valley	1951
Barry Cord	WE	Mesquite Johnny	1952
Barry Cord	WE	Savage Valley	1957	Ace
Barry Cord	WE	Trail to Sundown	1953
Barry Cord	WE	Cain Basin	1954
Barry Cord	WE	The Sagebrush Kid	1954
Barry Cord	WE	Boss of Barbed Wire	1955
Barry Cord	WE	Dry Range	1955		UK: issued as The Rustlers of Dry Range (1956)
Barry Cord	WE	The Guns of Hammer	1956
Barry Cord	WE	The Gun-Shy Kid	1957
Barry Cord	WE	The Prodigal Gun	1957	Ace
Barry Cord	WE	Sheriff of Big Hat	1957	Ace
Barry Cord	WE	Concho Valley	1958
Barry Cord	WE	Gun-Proddy Hombre	1958
Barry Cord	WE	The Iron Trail Killers	1959
Barry Cord	WE	Last Chance at Devil's Canyon	1959	Ace
Barry Cord	WE	Maverick Gun	1959
Barry Cord	WE	The Third Rider	1959
Barry Cord	WE	Six Bullets Left	1959
Barry Cord	WE	Starlight Range	1959		reissued as Slade (1961)
Barry Cord	WE	War in Peaceful Valley	1959	Ace
Barry Cord	WE	Two Guns to Avalon	1962
Barry Cord	WE	The Masked Gun	1963
Barry Cord	WE	A Ranger Called Solitary	1966
Barry Cord	WE	Canyon Showdown	1967
Barry Cord	WE	Gallows Ghost	1967
Barry Cord	WE	Last Stage to Gomorrah	1967
Barry Cord	WE	The Long Wire	1968
Barry Cord	WE	Trouble in Peaceful Valley	1968
Barry Cord	WE	The Coffin Fillers	1972
Barry Cord	WE	Hell in Paradise Valley	1972
Barry Cord	WE	Desert Knights	1973
Barry Cord	WE	The Running Iron Samaritans	1973
Barry Cord	WE	Deadly Amigos: Two Graves For A Gunman	1979
Barry Cord	WE	Gun Junction	1979
Barry Cord	WE	Boss of the Tumbling H	1995	Black Horse Western	first in the magazine West May 1948
James Kane	WE	Gunman's Choice	1960
James Kane	WE	Renegade Ranger	1963	Muller
James Kane	WE	The Doublecross Gun	1970
James Kane	WE	Last Gun to Jericho	1970		rewrite of Texas Rangers' Riot at Hell's Bend December 1955
James Kane	WE	Four Graves West	1971
James Kane	WE	Texas Warrior	1971
James Kane	WE	Brassada Hill	1972
Jim Kane	WE	Renegade Rancher	1961
Jim Kane	WE	Gunman's Choice	1962
Jim Kane	WE	Spanish Gold	1963
Jim Kane	WE	Tangled Trails	1963
Jim Kane	WE	Lost Canyon	1964
Jim Kane	WE	Red River Sheriff	1965
Jim Kane	WE	Rendezvous at Bitter Wells	1966
Jack Slade	WE	A Hell of a Way to Die	-
Jack Slade	WE	The Man from Lordsburg	1970
Jack Slade	WE	Gunfight at Ringo Junction	1971
Jack Slade	WE	The Man from Tombstone	1971
Jack Slade	WE	Funeral Bend	1973
Jack Slade	WE	Sidewinder	1973
Jack Slade	WE	Five Graves for Lassiter	1979
Jack Slade	WE	The Man from Yuma	1982
Jack Bertin	SF	The Interplanetary Adventures	1970
Jack Bertin	SF	The Pyramids from Space	1977
