= The Mucker =

1914 novel by Edgar Rice Burroughs

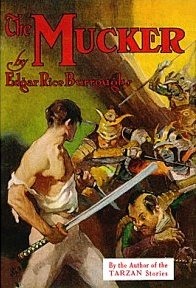
- Dust-jacket of The Mucker
- Author: Edgar Rice Burroughs
- Language: English
- Publisher: A. C. McClurg
- Publication date: October - November 1914
- Publication place: United States
- Media type: Print (hardback)
- Pages: 414

The Mucker is a novel by American writer Edgar Rice Burroughs. It was originally formed by two stories: "The Mucker", begun in August 1913 and published by All-Story Weekly in October and November 1914; and "The Return of the Mucker", begun in January 1916 and published by All-Story Weekly in June and July 1916. The book version was first published by A. C. McClurg on 31 October 1921. From January 1922 to August 1939, Methuen (UK) published a version of The Return of the Mucker under the title The Man Without a Soul.

In 1917, Burroughs wrote a third Mucker story entitled The Oakdale Affair featuring the Return of the Mucker sidekick, Bridge. The story was serialized the next year. In 2008, Leonaur Ltd. published all three stories in the Mucker "trilogy" in a collected volume entitled The Complete Mucker.

== Plot summary ==
Billy Byrne is a low class American born in Chicago's ghetto. He grows up a thief and a mugger. "Billy was a mucker, a hoodlum, a gangster, a thug, a tough." He is not chivalrous nor kind, and has only meager ethics - never giving evidence against a friend or leaving someone behind. He chooses a life of robbery and violence, disrespecting those who work for a living. He has a deep hatred for wealthy society.

He trains as a prizefighter but cannot stop drinking. When falsely accused of murder, he flees to San Francisco and is shanghaied aboard a ship. Enforced sobriety, brutal ship's discipline and productive work improve him. The ship's secret mission is soon enacted - the hijacking of a specific yacht to take a millionaire's daughter, Barbara Harding, for ransom. Billy Byrne brutally beats her suitor, Billy Mallory, leaving him for dead.

"He knew that she looked down upon him as an inferior being. She was of the class that addressed those in his walk of life as 'my man.'" After Barbara confronts him and calls him a coward, a change begins in Billy Byrne. He saves the life of one kidnapper, Theriere, rather than letting him be washed overboard, though he cannot fathom his own reasons. After a terrible storm, the ship is damaged and only makes it to land with Billy's help at the wheel. He rescues Barbara from the wreck and brings her ashore. Barbara is kidnapped by headhunters descended from medieval Japanese. Byrne and Theriere race to rescue her from the daimyo's hut in the middle of the village, but Theriere is fatally wounded in the escape.

Billy protects Barbara from the jungle for weeks while his own wounds heal. After realizing he's in love with her, he agrees to let her teach him how to speak properly. When he is again wounded while rescuing two of her father's ships officers from savages, she confesses her love for him also. Learning that Mallory is still alive, and being held by the headhunters along with her father, Billy sets off to free them. During their escape, Billy is severely injured. Certain he is mortally wounded, he sends Mr. Harding and Mallory to care for Barbara. However, the next day finds him clinging to life, and he slowly retraces his steps to where he left Barbara. Believing him dead, they have all left. Months later, he is picked up by a ship.

Upon returning to the States, Billy gets a job as a fighter. As he reads about his victory in the papers, he spots a small notice that Barbara's engagement to Mallory has been broken. Coincidentally, Barbara sees the news about Billy's fight, and sends for him. As he enters her father's posh home, he realizes that he can never fit in there. He explains that the gulf between them cannot be bridged, and that she and Mallory must marry.

=== Sequel: "The Return of the Mucker" ===
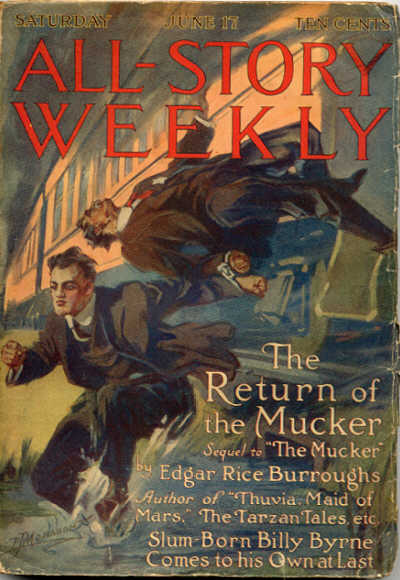
"The Return of the Mucker" was published in All-Story Weekly in 1916.

Billy returns to his old Chicago haunts intending to clear his name. His time with Barbara imbued him with faith in the law and justice. However, he soon realizes that the system is more interested in finding someone guilty than in finding the guilty party. Awaiting the verdict, he reads that Barbara and Mallory are about to marry. He is found guilty and sentenced to life imprisonment.

Disillusioned, he jumps from the train carrying him to the state prison. He falls in with Bridge, a poetic gentleman tramp who refuses to turn him in after finding out he's on the lam. He and Bridge head south, pursued by a detective. To avoid capture, Billy determines to cross to Mexico, and Bridge elects to come along.

Mexico is torn by internal warfare, and they are quickly captured by a bandit general, Pesita. He hires Billy into his private army, but Bridge has to seek work at a nearby American ranch. The ranch is owned by Mr. Harding, who has foolishly brought his daughter Barbara to this unstable country, at her insistence, to escape questions about her cancelled marriage.

In the meantime, Billy is sent to case a garrisoned town to plan for Pesita's force to storm and rob the bank. Billy finds the layout trivial and stealthily robs it himself. Coincidentally, Bridge has been sent to the same town to collect the payroll from the bank. Bridge notices a figure on horseback as Billy leaves town. Bridge gives chase to the unknown horseman, and the two exchange fire before recognizing each other. Billy's horse is killed, so Bridge insists he take his ranch horse, Brazos, and escape before the garrison catches him.

Back at the American ranch, some hands spot a large American riding Brazos during a raid by Pesita. The foreman demands that Bridge explain, but he cannot without betraying Billy. All assume Bridge robbed the bank, and the foreman plans to turn him over to general Villa, who will hang him. Barbara helps him escape, but he is later captured. Barbara pays a shady native, Jose, to take a message to the unknown large American, asking him to aid the imprisoned Bridge.

Billy rescues Bridge from jail and they ride back to Pesita's headquarters. When Billy learns that Brazos belongs to an unnamed girl Bridge admires, he decided to return the horse regardless of his own safety. An errand for Pesita stops him at Jose's house, where he is captured by the American foreman and some of Villa's men. Knowing he robbed the bank, they secure him for the night at the ranch. Barbara comes to talk to the unknown American, and discovers Billy. She helps him to escape, and immediately afterward she is kidnapped.

Billy learns about the kidnapping and races back to the ranch. He and the American hands ride out to search for her. The Mexican hands decide to go into town, leaving only Mr. Harding and three servants. Pesita learns that the American ranch is ripe for a raid. Bridge overhears this, takes off to the ranch and organizes its pitiful defences.

Billy tracks Barbara to a native village and rescues her. They return to the ranch in time to save Bridge and Mr. Harding, and they all ride for the US. At the border military compound, Billy tells Barbara he won't give her up again, and they plan to leave the country. Billy runs into the detective who had chased him, and finds out the guilty man has confessed and Billy himself has been pardoned. Mr. Harding, Barbara and Billy depart for New York, and Bridge returns to his vagabond life.

== Criticism ==
Author Richard A. Lupoff placed it at fourth place on a reading list of essential Burroughs novels in his 1965 book Master of Adventure: The Worlds of Edgar Rice Burroughs. Lupoff calls the novel "a most remarkable technical achievement" and states that "In a single book it is virtually a catalog of the pulps." However, Lupoff ranks The Return of the Mucker less highly (and criticizes it for its negative portrayal of Mexicans) and dismisses The Oakdale Affair as having little to recommend it.

== Copyright ==
The copyright for this story has expired in the United States and, thus, now resides in the public domain there. The text is available via Project Gutenberg.
