= Clayton Matthews =

American novelist

Clayton Hartley Matthews
- Born: October 24, 1918
- Died: March 25, 2004 (aged 85)
- Occupation: Novelist
- Spouse: (2) Patricia Matthews (1972–2004)
- Writing career
- Pen name: Clayton Matthews
- Period: 1958–1998
- Genres: mystery, erotic, romance

Clayton Hartley Matthews (24 October 1918 – 25 March 2004) was an American writer of mystery, erotic and romance novels, with more than 35 books and many short stories as Clayton Matthews. He often collaborated with his wife, writer Patricia Matthews (Patty Brisco); and they were called "the hottest couple in paperbacks.".

== Life ==
Clayton Hartley Matthews was born on 24 October 1918. He started writing short stories in the late 1950s. He began contributing to the Mike Shayne Mystery Magazine and then turned to writing paperback novels, mostly in the erotic genre, in the early 1960s.

In a California's local writers' group, he met writer Patty Brisco. After his divorce, they married on 3 November 1972, and lived near San Diego. In the late 1970s, his agent Jay Garon, suggested to him and his wife to write romance novels. In the 1980s and 1990s Matthews and his wife collaborated on romance and mystery novels. Matthews died on 25 March 2004.

== Bibliography ==
=== Short stories ===
- "Stone Cold Dead" in Mike Shayne Mystery Magazine (1965)
- Man From U.N.C.L.E. (1966/Sep) (with Joe L. Hensley, Morris Hershman and Steve April)
- "The Handyman" in AHMM (1967/Apr)
- "The Ultimate Death of Roger Blaine" in Mike Shayne Mystery Magazine (1968/Jun)
- "Raft of Fear" in Mike Shayne Mystery Magazine (1970/May)
- "The Big Stretch" in Mike Shayne Mystery Magazine (1970/Jun) (with Edward D. Hoch and Brett Halliday)
- Alfred Hitchcock (1970/Jun) (with James McKimmey)
- "Twister" in Mike Shayne Mystery Magazine (1970/Aug) (with M.G. Ogan and Walter J. Sheldon)
- "Pit of Fear" in Mike Shayne Mystery Magazine (1974/Apr)
- "Sweet Alice" in Mike Shayne Mystery Magazine (1980/Oct) (with Michael Avallone, John Ball, Paul Greeson, Edward D. Hoch, William F. Nolan, James M. Reasoner, Larry Sterling, Mike Taylor and J.L. Washburn)
- "Run, Rabbit, Run" in Mike Shayne Mystery Magazine (1981/Mar) (with Leo Whitaker)
- "Bucknell's Law" in Mike Shayne Mystery Magazine (1981/Sep)
- "Going to Pot" in Mike Shayne Mystery Magazine (1981/Sep)
- "The Caliber of Death" in Mike Shayne Mystery Magazine (1982/Jul) (with Talmage Powell)
- Alfred Hitchcock (1986/Jun) (with Wilbur Daniel Steele)
- Alfred Hitchcock (1973/Sep) (with Ron Goulart and Alan Dean Foster)
- "Trade-Off" in Classic Pulp Fiction Stories (1997/Aug)

=== Novels ===
- A Rage Of Desire (1960)
- Discontented Wives (1961)
- The Strange Ways of Love (1961)
- Faithless (1962)
- Sex dancer (1962)
- The Promiscuous Doll (1962)
- Nude Running (1963)
- The Corrupter (1964)
- Dive into death (1969)
- The Mendoza File (1970)
- Nylon Nightmare (1970)
- Bounty Hunt at Ballarat (1973)
- The Big Score (1973)
- The Negotiator (1975)
- Macho (1976)
- New Orleans (1976)
- Hong Kong (1976)
- Dallas (1978)
- The Power Seekers (1978)
- The Harvesters (1979)
- The Proud Castles (1986)
- Twister (1986)
- Death at the Border (1987)

=== For the Millions Series (multi-author) ===
- Hypnotism for the Millions (1968)
- Secret Psychic Organizations for the Millions (1969)

=== Moraghan Saga ===
1. The Birthright (1979)
2. The Disinherited (1982)
3. The Redeemers (1984)

=== Omnibus in collaboration ===
- Hager's Castle (1969) (with Bill Hughes)
- At The Border (2004) (with Mark Schroder)

=== In collaboration with Arthur Moore ===
==== Novels ====
- Las Vegas (1974)

=== In collaboration with Patricia Matthews ===
==== Novels ====
- Midnight Whispers (1981)
- Empire (1982)
- Midnight Lavender (1985)

==== Casey Farrell Series ====
1. The Scent of Fear (1992)
2. Vision of Death (1992)
3. Taste of Evil (1993)
4. Sound of Murder (1994)
5. Touch of Terror (1995)

== References and sources ==
- Clayton Matthews in Fantastic Fiction
- Clayton Matthews on LibraryThing
- Mystery File
