= James Michael Ullman =

American novelist

James Michael Ullman (1925–1997) was an American novelist and newspaper writer/editor known for his work in and about the Chicago area.

== Education, employment, war service ==
Ullman served in World War II and the U.S. Navy for two and a half years, and also served as an Air Force civilian employee on Guam.

Ullman became a newspaperman soon after. He served as police reporter on the La Porte, Indiana Herald-Argus, was editor of the Skokie, IL News and served as head of the United Press Bureau's Chicago desk.

Ullman was educated at Chicago's Wright Junior College and De Paul University, eventually receiving a master's degree in Journalism from Northwestern University in 1954.

He won a prize in the Ellery Queen Magazine's 1953 contest with his first story Anything New on the Strangler? His short stories continued to appear in Ellery Queen's Mystery Magazine through the early 1960s when he turned to novels.

== Novels ==
Ullman's first novel The Neon Haystack won Simon & Schuster's Inner Sanctum Mystery Award in 1963. The story centers around Steve Kolchak, who arrives in "a mid-western city" in search of his brother who disappeared exactly one year earlier. Kolchak takes the same hotel room, walks into the same dive bars and befriends the same shady characters who last saw his brother before his disappearance.

Ullman's 1966 novel, The Venus Trap, follows a similar theme: its protagonist goes in search of his father who went missing many years earlier, last having been seen leaving home with a strange man and a million dollars in diamonds in the heel of his shoe.

This theme of family members gone missing held a certain attraction to Ullman, and eventually encouraged the writing of this article. Ullman, his work, and his biography – like one of his mystery novel characters – had seemed to simply disappear without a trace in the digital online age.

Perhaps Ullman's most popular and enduring work appeared in 1981, titled How to Hold a Garage Sale. Still popular as a how-to book among enthusiasts of the backyard sale, the book can still be found on Amazon and other markets. In 1986, Ullman co-authored the similarly themed Dow Jones-Irwin Guide to Using IRA's.

In 1987, Ullman and his 1954 short story Dead Ringer were honored by appearing in the collection Murder & Mystery in Chicago, a collection of mysteries set in the city Ullman called home. Ullman died in 1997.
