= List of Ace double titles =

American company Ace Books began publishing genre fiction starting in 1952. Initially these were mostly in tête-bêche format with the ends of the two parts meeting in the middle and with a divider between them which functioned as the rear cover of both (the two parts were oriented upside-down with respect to each other in order to effect this), but the company also published some single volumes during the early years. The proportion of singles increased until they stopped producing doubles about 1978. The tête-bêche format was discarded in 1973, but future double novels were continued for a while with both parts oriented the same way, so that the first page of one part followed soon after the last page of the other part.

Between 1952 and 1968, the books had a letter-series identifier; after that date they were given five-digit numeric serial numbers. The list given here includes every Ace Double Book published between 1952 and 1978, for all genres. It gives a date of publication; in all cases this refers to the date of publication by Ace, and not the date of original publication of the novels. For more information about the history of these titles, see the entry for Ace Books, which includes a discussion of the serial numbering conventions used and an explanation of the letter-code system.

== Genres and collectability ==
Ace published science fiction, mysteries, and Westerns, as well as books not in any of these genres. Several bibliographic references have been compiled for the science fiction books (see § References).

Because the tête-bêche format is part of the attraction for some collectors, titles published between 1974 and 1978, which contained two titles by one or two authors but which are not tête-bêche, are not regarded by some collectors as true Ace Doubles. All the books are included in the list given below, with the difference in format noted.

The list given here includes an indication of the genre of the works, in italics after the serial number. Abbreviations used are "SF" for science fiction titles; "MY" for mystery titles, and "WE" for Westerns. In addition, "NA" is used to mean "not applicable", when one or both of the books is not in one of these three genres; and "UN", when the genre of the books is not known. The list also gives a date of publication; in all cases this refers to the date of publication by Ace, and not necessarily the date of original publication of the novels.

The list is thought to be complete, but there may be minor omissions among the later lists.

For more information about the history of these titles, see Ace Books, which includes a discussion of the serial numbering conventions used and an explanation of the letter-code system.

== Jokes ==
The double format inspired contests for ironic or satirical combinations of titles that might appear, as in "No Blade of Grass"/"The Sheep Look Up".

"It's a fond legend of fandom that if an SF editor got his hands on the Old and New Testaments, they'd be published as War God of Israel and The Thing With Three Souls.

— Dave Langford, SFX, issue #81, August 2001

== D and S Series ==
- D-001 MY Samuel W. Taylor The Grinning Gismo / Keith Vining Too Hot For Hell (1952)
- D-002 WE William Colt MacDonald Bad Man's Return / J. Edward Leithead Bloody Hoofs (1952)
- D-003 MY Mel Colton The Big Fix / Kate Clugston Twist the Knife Slowly (A Murderer in the House) (1952)
- D-004 WE Lewis B. Patten Massacre at White River / Walter A. Tompkins Rimrock Rider (1952)
- D-005 MY Eaton R. Goldthwaite The Scarlet Spade / Harry Whittington Drawn To Evil (1952)
- D-006 WE William E. Vance The Branded Lawman / Nelson C. Nye Plunder Valley (1952)
- D-007 MY Stephen Ransome I, the Executioner (False Bounty) / Harry Whittington So Dead My Love! (1953)
- D-008 WE Allan K. Echols Terror Rides the Range / Tom West Gunsmoke Gold (1953)
- D-009 MY Michael Morgan Decoy / Sherwood King If I Die Before I Wake (1953)
- D-010 WE Leslie Scott The Brazos Firebrand / Gordon Young Hell on Hoofs (1953)
- D-011 MY Day Keene Mrs. Homicide / William L. Stuart Dead Ahead
- D-012 WE Dudley Dean Mcgaughty (as Dean Owen) The Man From Boot Hill / Dan J. Stevens Wild Horse Range (1953)
- D-013 NA Theodore S. Drachman Cry Plague! / Leslie Edgley The Judas Goat (1953)
- D-014 WE Paul Evan Lehman Vultures On Horseback / George Kilrain Maverick With A Star (1953)
- D-015 MY William Burroughs (as William Lee) Junkie / Maurice Helbrant Narcotic Agent (1953)
- D-016 MY Edmond de Goncourt and J. De Goncourt Germinie / Paul Bourget Crime D'Amour (1953)
- D-017 MY William Campbell Gault (as Roney Scott) Shakedown / Howard Fast (as Walter Ericson) The Darkness Within
- D-018 WE J. Edward Leithead The Lead-Slingers / Samuel Peeples (as Brad Ward) The Hanging Hills (1953)
- D-019 MY Hal Braham (as Mel Colton) Never Kill A Cop / Leslie Edgley Fear No More (1953)
- D-020 WE Roy Manning The Desparado Code / Allan K. Echols Double-Cross Brand
- D-021 MY John N. Makris Nightshade / Lester Dent High Stakes (1953)
- D-022 WE Bliss Lomax Maverick Of The Plains / Leslie Scott Badlands Masquerader (1953)
- D-023 MY Louis Trimble (as Stuart Brock) Bring Back Her Body / Richard Sale Passing Strange (1953)
- D-024 WE Tom West Vulture Valley / John Callahan The Sidewinders (1953)
- D-025 NA P. G. Wodehouse Quick Service / The Code Of The Woosters (1953)
- D-026 NA Harold Acton and Lee Yi-Hsieh (translators) Love In A Junk And Other Exotic Tales / Charles Pettit The Impotent General (1953)
- D-027 MY Bruno Fischer The Fingered Man / Hal Braham (as Mel Colton) Double Take (1953)
- D-028 WE Paul Evans Gunsmoke Kingdom / William E. Vance Avenger From Nowhere (1953)
- D-029 MY Ross Laurence The Fast Buck / J. F. Hutton Dead Man Friday
- D-030 WE George Kilrain South To Santa Fe / Samuel Peeples (as Brad Ward) Johnny Sundance (1953)
- D-031 SF A. E. van Vogt The World of Null-A / The Universe Maker (1953)
- D-033 MY Carl G. Hodges Murder By The Pack / Frank Kane About Face
- D-034 WE Ken Murray Hellion's Hole / Ken Murray Feud In Piney Flats (1953)
- D-035 NA Rae Loomis The Marina Street Girls / Jack Houston Open All Night (1953)
- D-036 SF Robert E. Howard Conan the Conqueror / Leigh Brackett The Sword of Rhiannon (1953)
- D-037 MY Marvin Claire The Drowning Wire / Will Oursler Departure Delayed (1953)
- D-038 WE Bliss Lomax Outlaw River / Louis L'Amour (as Jim Mayo) Showdown At Yellow Butte
- D-039 WE Frank Gruber Quantrell's Raiders / Frank Gruber Rebel Road (1953)
- D-040 MY Cornell Woolrich (as William Irish) Waltz Into Darkness / Malden Grange Bishop Scylla
- D-041 MY Day Keene Death House Doll / Thomas B. Dewey Mourning After (1953)
- D-042 WE Walter A. Tompkins One Against The Bullet Horde / Charles M. Martin Law For Tombstone (1954)
- D-044 SF Donald A. Wollheim (ed.) The Ultimate Invader and Other Science-Fiction / Eric Frank Russell Sentinels From Space (1954)
- D-045 MY Martin L. Weiss Dead Hitches A Ride / Leslie Edgley Tracked Down (1954)
- D-046 WE Chuck Martin Law From Back Beyond / Roy Manning Vengeance Valley (1954)
- D-047 MY Joe Barry Kiss And Kill / Richard Powell On The Hook (1954)
- D-048 WE Louis L'Amour (as Jim Mayo) Utah Blaine / Brad Ward Desert Showdown (1954)
- D-049 MY Dan Cushman Tongking! / Charles Grayson Golden Temptress
- D-050 NA Wilene Shaw The Mating Call / Ozro Grant The Bad 'Un (1954)
- D-051 MY Emmett Mcdowell Switcheroo / Lawrence Treat Over The Edge (1954)
- D-052 WE William Colt Macdonald Boomtown Buccaneers / Louis L'Amour Crossfire Trail (1954)
- D-053 SF Murray Leinster Gateway to Elsewhere / A. E. van Vogt The Weapon Shops of Isher (1954)
- D-055 MY Robert Turner The Tobacco Auction Murders / Michael Stark Kill-Box
- D-056 WE Bliss Lomax Ambush At Coffin Canyon / Dwight Bennett Newton (as Clement Hardin) Hellbent For A Hangrope (1954)
- D-057 MY A. S. Fleischman Counterspy Express / M. V. Heberden (as Charles L. Leonard) Treachery In Trieste (1954)
- D-059 MY Robert Bloch Spiderweb / David Alexander The Corpse In My Bed (1951)
- D-061 SF L. Sprague de Camp Cosmic Manhunt / Clifford D. Simak Ring Around The Sun (1954)
- D-063 MY Harry Whittington You'll Die Next! / Frederick C. Davis Drag The Dark
- D-064 WE Paul Evan Lehman Bullets Don't Bluff / Chandler Whipple Under The Mesa Rim (1954)
- D-065 MY Edward Kimbrough Night Fire / Juanita Osborne Tornado (1954)
- D-068 WE Walker A. Tompkins Deadwood / William Hopson Bullet-Brand Empire (1954)
- D-069 SF Lewis Padgett (Henry Kuttner) and C. L. Moore) Beyond Earth's Gates / Andre Norton Daybreak—2250 A. D. (1954)
- D-071 MY John Creasey (as Gordon Ashe) Drop Dead! / Margaret Scherf The Case Of The Hated Senator (1954)
- D-072 WE Ralph R. Perry Night Rider Deputy / Norman A. Fox The Devil's Saddle (1954)
- D-073 SF Donald A. Wollheim (ed.) Adventures in the Far Future / Donald A. Wollheim (ed.) Tales of Outer Space (1954)
- D-077 MY Leigh Brackett (as George Sanders) Stranger At Home / Stephen Marlowe Catch The Brass Ring (1954)
- D-078 WE Nelson Nye The One-Shot Kid / Tom West Lobo Legacy (1954)
- D-079 SF Francis Rufus Bellamy Atta / Murray Leinster The Brain Stealers (1954)
- D-081 MY John A. Saxon Liability Limited / Sheldon Stark Too Many Sinners
- D-084 SF Isaac Asimov The Rebellious Stars / Roger Dee An Earth Gone Mad (1954)
- D-086 WE Richard Brister The Shoot-Out At Sentinel Peak / Roy Manning Tangled Trail (1954)
- D-089 MY Stephen Marlowe Turn Left For Murder / Ruth Wilson and Alexander Wilson Death Watch (1955)
- D-092 WE Burt Arthur The Drifter / Richard Wormser and Dan Gordon The Longhorn Trail (1955)
- D-094 SF Murray Leinster The Other Side of Here / A. E. van Vogt One Against Eternity (1955)
- D-096 SF Andre Norton (as Andrew North) The Last Planet / Alan E. Nourse A Man Obsessed (1955)
- D-098 WE Nelson Nye Texas Tornado / Samuel A. Peeples (as Samuel Anthony Peeples) The Lobo Horseman (1955)
- D-099 SF Robert Moore Williams Conquest of the Space Sea / Leigh Brackett The Galactic Breed (1955)
- D-101 MY Jack Karney Knock 'Em Dead / Hal Braham (as Mel Colton) Point Of No Escape
- D-103 SF Philip K. Dick Solar Lottery / Leigh Brackett The Big Jump (1955)
- D-106 WE D. L. Bonar Lawman Without A Badge / Lee Floren Four Texans North (1955)
- D-109 MY Dale Clark Mambo To Murder / Sterling Noel I See Red (1955)
- D-110 SF Isaac Asimov The 1000 Year Plan / Poul Anderson No World of Their Own (1955)
- D-112 WE Frank Castle Border Buccaneers / Harry Sinclair Drago Trigger Gospel (1955)
- D-113 SF Dwight V. Swain The Transposed Man / J. T. McIntosh One in 300 (1955)
- D-115 MY Harry Whittington One Got Away / Cleve F. Adams Shady Lady (1955)
- D-118 SF Charles L. Harness The Paradox Men / Jack Williamson Dome Around America (1955)
- D-120 WE John Mcgreevey Bounty Man / Samuel A. Peeples (as Samuel Anthony Peeples) The Call Of The Gun
- D-121 SF Andre Norton The Stars are Ours! / Sam Merwin, Jr. Three Faces of Time (1955)
- D-123 MY Gil Brewer The Squeeze / Frank Diamond Love Me To Death (1955)
- D-128 WE William Hopson High Saddle / William E. Vance Way Station West (1955)
- D-129 MY Day Keene The Dangling Carrot / Norman C. Rosenthal Silenced Witnesses (1955)
- D-134 WE Gene Olsen The Outsiders / Nelson Nye Tornado On Horseback (1955)
- D-135 MY Milton K. Ozaki Maid For Murder / Rene Brabazon Raymond (as James Hadley Chase) Dead Ringer (1955)
- D-138 WE Paul Evan Gunsmoke Over Sabado / T. V. Olsen Haven Of The Hunted (1956)
- D-139 SF Nick Boddie Williams The Atom Curtain / Gordon R. Dickson Alien From Arcturus (1956)
- D-144 WE Jay Albert The Man From Stony Lonesome / Rod Patterson A Killer Comes Riding (1956)
- D-146 SF Lee Correy Contraband Rocket / Murray Leinster The Forgotten Planet (1956)
- D-147 MY Gregory Jones Prowl Cop / Norman Herries My Private Hangman (1956)
- D-149 MY Ronald Kayser (as Dale Clark) A Run For The Money / Mark Macklin The Thin Edge Of Mania (1955)
- D-150 SF Philip K. Dick The World Jones Made / Margaret St. Clair Agent of the Unknown (1956)
- D-156 WE Lee Floren Thruway West / Stephen C. Lawrence The Naked Range (1956)
- D-157 MY Louis Trimble Stab In The Dark / Jonathon Gant Never Say No To A Killer
- D-160 WE Karl Kramer Action Along The Humboldt / Michael Carder Decision At Sundown
- D-162 SF Jerry Sohl The Mars Monopoly / R. DeWitt Miller and Anna Hunger The Man Who Lived Forever, (1956)
- D-164 SF Gordon R. Dickson Mankind on The Run / Andre Norton The Crossroads of Time (1956)
- D-166 WE Samuel A. Peeples (as Samuel Anthony Peeples) Terror At Tres Alamos / Stuart Brock Whispering Canyon
- D-167 MY Milton K. Ozaki Never Say Die / John Creighton Destroying Angel (1956)
- D-170 MY Day Keene Flight By Night / Lawrence Goldman Black Fire
- D-172 WE Robert J. Steelman Stages South / Ben Smith Johnny No-Name (1956)
- D-173 SF Ray Cummings The Man Who Mastered Time / Joseph E. Kelleam Overlords of Space (1956)
- D-176 SF Thomas Calvert McClary Three Thousand Years / Margaret St. Clair The Green Queen (1956)
- D-177 MY Stephen Marlowe (as C.H. Thames) Violence Is Golden / Robert Turner The Girl In The Cop's Pocket (1956)
- D-180 WE Nelson C. Nye The No-Gun Fighter / Walt Coburn One Step Ahead Of The Posse (1956)
- D-182 NA Émile Zola Shame / Thérèse Raquin (1956)
- D-185 MY Geoffrey Holmes Build My Gallows High / Harry Whittington The Humming Box (1956)
- D-186 WE Ray Hogan Ex-Marshall / Edward Churchill Steel Horizon (1956)
- D-189 MY Lawrence Treat Weep For A Wanton / Stephen Marlowe Dead On Arrival (1956)
- D-192 WE Roy Manning Beware Of This Tenderfoot / John Callahan Bad Blood At Black Range (1956)
- D-193 SF Philip K. Dick The Man Who Japed / E. C. Tubb The Space-Born (1956)
- D-195 MY Robert Colby The Quaking Widow / Dudley Dean Macgaughy (as Owen Dudley) The Deep End
- D-196 WE Walt Coburn The Night Branders / Frank Gruber The Highwayman
- D-197 MY James Byron TNT For Two / Charles Weiser Frey (as Ferguson Findley) Counterfeit Corpse (1956)
- D-199 SF Poul Anderson Planet of No Return / Andre Norton Star Guard (1956)
- D-201 MY Harry Whittington Across That River / Nathaniel E. Jones Saturday Mountain (1957)
- D-203 MY William Grote Cain's Girlfriend / William L. Rohde Uneasy Lies The Head (1957)
- D-204 WE Paul Durst John Law, Keep Out! / Gordon Donalds The Desperate Donigans (1957)
- D-205 SF Donald A. Wollheim (ed.) The Earth in Peril / Lan Wright Who Speaks of Conquest? (1957)
- D-208 WE Glenn Balch Blind Man's Bullets / Barry Cord The Prodigal Gun (1957)
- D-209 MY John Jake A Night For Treason / F. L. Wallace Three Times A Victim (1957)
- D-215 SF Eric Frank Russell Three To Conquer / Robert Moore Williams Doomsday Eve (1957)
- D-216 WE Barry Cord Savage Valley / William Colt Macdonald Ridin' Through (1957)
- D-217 MY Bob McKnight Downwind / B. E. Lovell A Rage To Kill (1957)
- D-220 WE Ray Hogan The Friendless One / John Jakes Wear A Fast Gun (1956)
- D-221 MY Gordon Ashe You've Bet Your Life / Robert Chavis Terror Package (1957)
- D-223 SF Robert Silverberg The 13th Immortal / James E. Gunn This Fortress World (1957)
- D-225 MY Kendell Foster Crossen (as M. E. Chaber) A Lonely Walk / Harry Giddings Loser By A Head (1957)
- D-226 WE Edwin Booth Showdown At Warbird / Samuel A. Peeples Doc Colt (1957)
- D-227 SF H. Beam Piper and John J. McGuire Crisis in 2140 / Cyril Judd (Cyril M. Kornbluth and Judith Merril) Gunner Cade (1957)
- D-230 WE Barry Cord Boss Of Barbed Wire / Lee Floren Burn 'Em Out! (1957)
- D-231 MY Dudley Dean Macgaughy (as Owen Dudle) Murder For Charity / Edward S. Aarons (as Edward Ronn) Point Of Peril (1957)
- D-235 MY Jack Webb (as John Farr) The Lady And The Snake / Louis Trimble Nothing To Lose But My Life (1957)
- D-236 WE Edwin Booth Jinx Rider / Ray Hogan Walk A Lonely Trail (1957)
- D-237 SF Robert Silverberg Master of Life and Death / James White The Secret Visitors (1957)
- D-240 WE Wayne C. Lee Broken Wheel Ranch / Tom West Torture Trail (1957)
- D-241 MY Harry Whittington One Deadly Dawn / Wilson Tucker The Hired Target (1957)
- D-242 SF A. E. van Vogt Empire of the Atom / Frank Belknap Long Space Station 1 (1957)
- D-247 MY Ken Lewis Look Out Behind You / John Creighton Not So Evil As Eve (1957)
- D-248 WE Dwight Bennett Newton (as Clement Hardin) Longhorn Law / Ray Hogan Cross Me In Gunsmoke (1957)
- D-249 SF Philip K. Dick The Cosmic Puppets / Andre Norton (as Andrew North) Sargasso of Space (1957)
- D-252 WE John Callahan The Rawhide Breed / Rod Patterson Prairie Terror (1957)
- D-253 MY Bruce Cassiday The Buried Motive / Prentice Winchell (as Spencer Dean) Marked Down For Murder (1957)
- D-255 SF Kenneth Bulmer City Under the Sea / Poul Anderson Star Ways (1957)
- D-259 MY Michael Avallone The Case Of The Violent Virgin / The Case Of The Bouncing Betty (1957)
- D-260 WE Ray Hogan and Matt Slade Land Of The Strangers / Lee Floren The Saddle Wolves (1957)
- D-264 WE Barry Cord Cain Basin / Lee E. Wells Brother Outlaw (1958)
- D-265 MY Robert Bloch Shooting Star / Robert Bloch Terror In The Night (And Other Stories)
- D-266 SF E. C. Tubb The Mechanical Monarch / Charles L. Fontenay Twice Upon A Time (1958)
- D-272 WE Lee Floren Riders In The Night / William Hopson Backlash At Cajon Pass
- D-273 MY Ernest Jason Fredericks Shakedown Hotel / John Roscoe and Michael Roscoe (as Mike Roscoe) The Midnight Eye (1958)
- D-276 WE Barry Cord The Gunsmoke Trail / Tom West Lead In His Fists (1958)
- D-277 SF Murray Leinster City on The Moon / Donald A. Wollheim (ed.) Men on The Moon (1958)
- D-279 MY J. Harvey Bond Bye Bye, Baby! / Bob McKnight Murder Mutuel
- D-284 WE Barry Cord The Guns Of Hammer / Edwin Booth The Man Who Killed Tex (1958)
- D-285 MY Bruce Cassiday Brass Shroud / Joseph Linklater Odd Woman Out (1958)
- D-286 SF Robert Silverberg Invaders From Earth / Donald A. Wollheim (as David Grinnell) Across Time (1958)
- D-288 WE Edwin Booth Trail To Tomahawk / John Callhan Land Beyond The Law
- D-289 MY Alan Payne This'll Slay You / John Hawkins and Ward Hawkins Violent City
- D-291 SF Robert Silverberg (as Calvin M. Knox) Lest We forget Thee, Earth / Raymond Z. Gallun People Minus X (1958)
- D-294 WE John H. Latham Bad Bunch Of The Brasada / Walt Coburn Beyond The Wide Missouri (1958)
- D-295 SF Jack Vance Big Planet / The Slaves of The Klau (1958)
- D-297 MY Peter Rabe The Cut Of The Whip / Robert Kelston Kill One, Kill Two (1958)
- D-298 WE Paul Evans Thunder Creek Range / William E. Vance Outlaws Welcome! (1958)
- D-299 SF Andre Norton Star Born / H. Beam Piper and John J. McGuire A Planet For Texans (1958)
- D-301 MY Jack Webb (as John Farr) The Deadly Combo / Russ Winterbotham (as J. Harvey Bond) Murder Isn't Funny (1958)
- D-303 SF Poul Anderson The Snows of Ganymede / War of the Wing-Men (1958)
- D-304 WE Archie Joscelyn River To The Sunset / Ben Smith Trouble At Breakdam (1958)
- D-305 MY Vic Rodell Free-Lance Murder / Louis King Cornered (1958)
- D-308 WE Jack M. Bickham Gunman's Gamble / Roy Manning Draw And Die! (1958)
- D-311 SF Robert Silverberg Stepsons of Terra / Lan Wright A Man Called Destiny (1958)
- D-313 MY Samuel Krasney Design For Dying / J. M. Flynn The Deadly Boodle (1958)
- D-315 SF Eric Frank Russell The Space Willies / Six Worlds Yonder (1958)
- D-316 WE Rod Patterson A Time For Guns / Barry Cord Mesquite Johnny (1958)
- D-317 MY John Creighton The Wayward Blonde / Gerry Travis The Big Bite (1958)
- D-320 WE Robert Mccaig The Rangemaster / William Hopson The Last Shoot-Out (1958)
- D-321 MY John Creighton Trial By Perjury / Louis Trimble The Smell Of Trouble (1958)
- D-322 SF Robert Moore Williams The Blue Atom / The Void Beyond and Other Stories (1958)
- D-328 WE Merle Constiner The Fourth Gunman / Tom West Slick On The Draw (1958)
- D-329 MY Robert Emmett Mcdowell (as Emmett Mcdowell) Stamped For Death / Robert Emmett Mcdowell (as Emmett Mcdowell) Three For The Gallows (1958)
- D-331 SF Kenneth Bulmer The Secret of Zi / Ray Cummings Beyond the Vanishing Point (1958)
- D-332 WE Kermit Welles Blood On Boot Hill / Ben Smith Stranger In Sundown (1959)
- D-333 MY Mike Brett Scream Street / John Creighton Stranglehold (1959)
- D-335 SF Poul Anderson The War of Two Worlds / John Brunner Threshold of Eternity (1959)
- D-345 SF Andre Norton (as Andrew North) Plague Ship / Voodoo Planet (1959)
- D-346 WE Ray Hogan Wanted: Alive! / Barry Cord Sherriff Of Big Hat (1957)
- D-347 MY Louis Trimble The Corpse Without A Country / Harry Whittington Play For Keeps (1957)
- D-348 WE T. V. Olsen The Man From Nowhere / John L. Shelley The Avenging Gun (1959)
- D-349 MY Leslie Frederick Brett (as Mike Brett) The Guilty Bystander / Russell Robert Winterbotham (as J. Harvey Bond) Kill Me With Kindness (1959)
- D-351 SF Edmond Hamilton The Sun Smasher / Robert Silverberg (as Ivar Jorgenson) Starhaven (1959)
- D-356 WE Paul Durst Kansas Guns / Tom West The Cactus Kid (1958)
- D-357 MY Lester Dent Lady In Peril / Floyd Wallace Wired For Scandal (1959)
- D-358 SF Robert Silverberg (as Calvin M. Knox) The Plot Against Earth / Milton Lesser Recruit for Andromeda (1959)
- D-360 WE John H. Latham Johnny Sixgun / Barry Cord War In Peaceful Valley (1959)
- D-361 MY James P. Duff Dangerous To Know / Robert Colby Murder Mistress (1959)
- D-362 SF John Brunner The 100th Millennium / Donald A. Wollheim (as David Grinnell) Edge of Time (1959)
- D-367 MY Louis Trimble Till Death Do Us Part / Charles E. Fritch Negative Of A Nude (1959)
- D-368 WE Ray Hogan Hangman's Valley / Joseph Gage A Score To Settle (1959)
- D-369 SF Brian W. Aldiss Vanguard From Alpha / Kenneth Bulmer The Changeling Worlds (1959)
- D-372 WE Dan Kirby Cimarron Territory / Glenn Balach Grass Greed (1959)
- D-373 MY Jack Karney The Knave Of Diamonds / Doug Warren Scarlet Starlet (1959)
- D-375 SF Damon Knight Masters of Evolution / George O. Smith Fire in the Heavens (1959)
- D-379 MY William Woody Mistress Of Horror House / Jay Flynn (as J. M. Flynn) Drink With The Dead (1959)
- D-380 WE William Heuman My Brother The Gunman / Barry Cord Concho Valley (1959)
- D-381 SF Jerry Sohl One Against Herculum / Andre Norton Secret of the Lost Race (1959)
- D-384 WE Louis Trimble Mountain Ambush / Jack M. Bickham Feud Fury
- D-385 SF John Brunner Echo In The Skull / Alan E. Nourse Rocket To Limbo (1959)
- D-387 MY Laine Fisher Fare Prey / Bob McKnight The Bikini Bombshell (1959)
- D-391 SF John Brunner The World Swappers / A. E. van Vogt Siege of the Unseen (1959)
- D-392 WE Tom West Twisted Trail / Archie Joscelyn The Man From Salt Creek (1959)
- D-393 MY Joseph L. Chadwick (as John Creighton) Evil Is The Night / Robert A. Levey Dictators Die Hard (1959)
- D-400 WE Barry Cord Last Chance At Devil's Canyon / Gordon D. Shirreffs Shadow Of A Gunman (1959)
- D-401 MY Louis Trimble Obit Deferred / Tedd Thomey I Want Out (1959)
- D-403 SF Murray Leinster The Mutant Weapon / The Pirates of Zan (1959)
- D-407 SF Poul Anderson We Claim These Stars! / Robert Silverberg The Planet Killers (1959)
- D-408 WE Edwin Booth Wyoming Welcome / Giles A. Lutz Law Of The Trigger (1959)
- D-409 MY Louis Trimble Cargo For The Styx / Jay Flynn (as J.M. Flynn) Terror Tournament (1959)
- D-412 WE E. A. Alman Ride The Long Night / Gordon D. Shirreffs Apache Butte (1959)
- D-413 SF Harlan Ellison The Man With Nine Lives / A Touch of Infinity (1959)
- D-415 MY Prentice Winchell (as Stewart Sterling) Fire On Fear Street / Dead Certain (1960)
- D-418 WE C. S. Park The Quiet Ones / Tom West Nothing But My Gun (1960)
- D-419 MY Bernard Thielen Open Season / Bob McKnight A Slice Of Death (1958)
- D-421 SF Philip K. Dick Dr. Futurity / John Brunner Slavers of Space (1960)
- D-424 WE Lee Richards Shoot Out At The Way Station / Robert Mccaig Wild Justice (1960)
- D-425 MY Roberta Elizabeth Sebenthal (as Paul Kruger) Dig Her A Grave / Joseph L. Chadwick (as John Creighton) A Half Interest In Murder (1960)
- D-427 SF Robert Moore Williams World of the Masterminds / To the Edge of Time and Other Stories (1960)
- D-430 WE William Hopson Born Savage / Ray Hogan The Hasty Hangman (1960)
- D-431 SF A. E. van Vogt Earth's Last Fortress / George O. Smith Lost in Space (1960)
- D-433 MY Jack Bradley If Hate Could Kill / Talmage Powell The Smasher (1960)
- D-436 WE Tom West The Phantom Pistoleer / Giles A. Lutz The Challenger (1960)
- D-437 SF Andre Norton The Sioux Spaceman / Richard Wilson And Then The Town Took Off (1960)
- D-439 MY Duane Decker The Devil's Punchbowl / Owen Dudley Run If You Can (1960)
- D-442 WE Jack M. Bickham Killer's Paradise / Rod Patterson Rider Of The Rincon (1960)
- D-443 SF Manly Wade Wellman The Dark Destroyers / Brian W. Aldiss Bow Down to Nul (1960)
- D-445 MY Robert Emmett Mcdowell (as Emmett Mcdowell) Bloodline To Murder / In At The Kill (1960)
- D-447 MY Bob McKnight Kiss The Babe Goodbye / J. M. Flynn The Hot Chariot (1960)
- D-448 WE Lee Floren Pistol-Whipper / Archie Joscelyn (as Al Cody) Winter Range (1960)
- D-449 SF Gordon R. Dickson The Genetic General / Time to Teleport (1960)
- D-450 WE Tom West Side Me With Sixes / Ray Hogan The Ridgerunner (1960)
- D-451 MY Steve Ward Odds Against Linda / Robert Martin A Key To The Morgue (1960)
- D-453 SF Kenneth Bulmer The Earth Gods Are Coming / Margaret St. Clair The Games of Neith (1960)
- D-456 WE Edwin Booth Danger Trail / Edwin Booth The Desperate Dude
- D-457 SF Philip K. Dick Vulcan's Hammer / John Brunner The Skynappers (1960)
- D-459 MY Howard J. Olmsted The Hot Diary / J. M. Flynn Ring Around A Rogue (1960)
- D-462 WE Jack M. Bickham The Useless Gun / John H. Latham The Long Fuse (1960)
- D-463 MY Prentice Winchell (as Stewart Sterling) Dying Room Only / The Body In The Bed (1960)
- D-465 SF John Brunner The Atlantic Abomination / Donald A. Wollheim (as David Grinnell) The Martian Missile (1960)
- D-469 MY Bob McKnight Running Scared / Talmage Powell Man-Killer (1960)
- D-470 WE Gene Olsen The Man Who Was Morgan / Ben Smith The Maverick (1960)
- D-471 SF John Brunner Sanctuary in the Sky / Jack Sharkey The Secret Martians (1960)
- D-476 WE Tom West Double Cross Dinero / Edwin Booth Last Valley (1960)
- D-477 MY Louis Trimble The Duchess Of Skid Row / Love Me And Die (1961)
- D-479 SF Wilson Tucker To the Tombaugh Station / Poul Anderson Earthman Go Home! (1960)
- D-483 MY Russell Robert Winterbotham (as J. Harvey Bond) If Wishes Were Hearses / Bruce Cassiday The Corpse In The Picture Window (1961)
- D-484 WE Ray Hogan Ambush At Riflestock / Archie Joscelyn (as Al Cody) Dead Man's Spurs (1961)
- D-485 SF Robert A. W. Lowndes The Puzzle Planet / Lloyd Biggle, Jr. The Angry Espers (1961)
- D-489 MY R. Arthur Somebody's Walking Over My Grave / John Miles Bickham (as John Miles) Dally With A Deadly Doll (1961)
- D-491 SF Fritz Leiber The Big Time / Fritz Leiber The Mind-Spider and Other Stories (1961)
- D-492 WE William Hopson Winter Drive / Giles A. Lutz The Wild Quarry (1961)
- D-496 WE Steven G. Lawrence With Blood In Their Eyes / Tom West Killer's Canyon (1961)
- D-497 SF John Brunner (as Keith Woodcott) I Speak For Earth / Ray Cummings Wandl The Invader (1961)
- D-499 MY Frederick C. Davis Night Drop / High Heel Homicide (1961)
- D-502 WE Paul Evan Lehman Troubled Range / Archie Joscelyn (as Al Cody) Long Night At Lodgepole (1961)
- D-505 MY Louis Trimble The Surfside Caper / Robert Colby In A Vanishing Room (1961)
- D-507 SF Kenneth Bulmer Beyond the Silver Sky / John Brunner Meeting At Infinity (1961)
- D-509 SF Andre Norton The Beast Master / Star Hunter (1961)
- D-510 WE Harry Whittington The Searching Rider / Jack M. Bickham Hangman's Territory (1961)
- D-511 MY J. M. Flynn One For The Death House / Bob McKnight Drop Dead, Please (1961)
- D-514 WE Gordon D. Shirreffs Hangin' Pards / Gordon D. Shirreffs Ride A Lone Trail (1961)
- D-515 MY Robert Colby Kill Me A Fortune / Prentice Winchell (as Stewart Sterling) Five Alarm Funeral (1961)
- D-517 SF Clifford Simak The Trouble With Tycho / A. Bertram Chandler Bring Back Yesterday (1961)

== F Series ==
- F-101 NA Joan Sargent Cruise Nurse / Margaret Howe Calling Dr. Merriman (1960)
- F-102 MY Bob McKnight The Flying Eye / Clayton Fox Never Forget, Never Forgive (1961)
- F-103 WE Harry Whittington A Trap For Sam Dodge / Lee Floren High Thunder (1961)
- F-104 SF Kenneth Bulmer No Man's World / Poul Anderson Mayday Orbit (1961)
- F-106 WE Brian Garfield Justice At Spanish Flat / Tom West The Gun From Nowhere (1961)
- F-107 MY Chester Warwick My Pal, The Killer / John Trinian Scratch A Thief (1961)
- F-108 SF G. McDonald Wallis The Light of Lilith / Damon Knight The Sun Saboteurs (1961)
- F-110 WE Ray Hogan Track The Man Down / Lee Wells Savage Range (1961)
- F-111 MY J. M. Flynn The Girl From Las Vegas / Robert Martin To Have And To Kill (1960)
- F-112 NA Jeanne Judson Barbara Ames - Private Secretary / Nell Marr Dean Ratzlaff (as Nell Marr Dean) Fashions For Carol (1961)
- F-113 SF Charles L. Fontenay Rebels of The Red Planet / J. T. McIntosh 200 Hundred Years to Christmas (1961)
- F-115 MY John Creighton The Blonde Cried Murder / Fletcher Flora Killing Cousins (1961)
- F-116 WE Dwight Bennett Newton (as Clement Hardin) The Lurking Gun / Louis Trimble Deadman Canyon (1961)
- F-117 SF Marion Zimmer Bradley The Door Through Space / A. Bertram Chandler Rendezvous on a Lost World (1961)
- F-119 SF Gordon R. Dickson Spacial Delivery / Delusion World (1961)
- F-120 WE Jack M. Brickham Gunman Can't Hide / John Callahan Come In Shooting (1961)
- F-121 MY Helen Nielson Sing Me A Murder / Helen Nielson Woman Missing And Other Stories (1961)
- F-122 NA Dorothy Worley Dr. Kilbourne Comes Home / Patti Stone Calling Nurse Linda (1961)
- F-123 SF Robert Silverberg Collision Course / Leigh Brackett The Nemesis From Terra (1961)
- F-124 WE Steven G. Lawrence Slatterly / Steven G. Lawrence Bullet Welcome For Slatterly (1961)
- F-125 MY J. M. Flynn Deep Six / Frank Diamond The Widow Maker (1961)
- F-126 WE Edwin Booth The Troublemaker / Ray Hogan A Marshall For Lawless (1962)
- F-127 SF Marion Zimmer Bradley Seven From The Stars / Keith Laumer Worlds Of The Imperium (1962)
- F-128 WE Tom West The Buzzard's Nest / Louis Trimble Siege At High Meadow (1962)
- F-129 SF William F. Temple The Automated Goliath / William F. Temple The Three Suns Of Amara (1962)
- F-130 MY J. M. Flynn The Screaming Cargo / James A. Howard The Bullet-Proof Martyr (1961)
- F-133 SF John Brunner Secret Agent of Terra / A. Bertram Chandler The Rim of Space (1962)
- F-134 WE Rod Patterson A Shooting At Sundust / Gordon D. Shirreffs Tumbleweed Trigger (1962)
- F-138 WE Steven G. Lawrence Walk A Narrow Trail / Steven G. Lawrence A Noose For Slattery (1962)
- F-139 SF Poul Anderson The Makeshift Rocket/Un-Man and Other Stories (1962)
- F-141 SF Robert Moore Williams The Darkness Before Tomorrow / John Brunner (as Keith Woodcott) The Ladder In The Sky (1962)
- F-142 WE L. P. Holmes Wolf Brand / Smoky Pass (1962)
- F-143 MY Bob McKnight A Stone Around Her Neck / Clayton Fox End Of A Big Wheel (1962)
- F-144 WE Brian Garfield (as Frank Wynne) Massacre Basin / Dwight Bennett Newton (as Clement Hardin) The Badge Shooters (1962)
- F-145 SF Robert Silverberg Next Stop The Stars / The Seed of Earth (1962)
- F-147 SF Andre Norton The Sea Siege / The Eye of The Monster (1962)
- F-148 WE Harry Whittington Wild Sky / Tom West Dead Man's Double Cross (1962)
- F-149 SF Robert Moore Williams / Charles de Vet (1962)
- F-150 WE Nelson Nye Hideout Mountain / Rafe (1962)
- F-152 WE Gordon D. Shirreffs Rio Desperado / Voice Of The Gun (1962)
- F-153 SF Marion Zimmer Bradley The Sword of Aldones / The Planet Savers (1962)
- F-155 MY Lionel White A Death At Sea / The Time Of Terror (1961)
- F-160 WE Ray Hogan New Gun For Kingdom City / The Shotgunner (1962)
- F-161 SF John Brunner Times Without Number / Donald A. Wollheim (as David Grinnell) Destinies Orbit (1962)
- F-164 WE Steven G. Lawrence Longhorns North / Slattery's Gun Says "No" (1962)
- F-165 SF Philip José Farmer Cache From Outer Space / The Celestial Blueprint (1962)
- F-166 MY Georges Simenon Maigret And The Reluctant Witness / Maigret Has Scruples (1962)
- F-172 WE Tom West Battling Buckeroos / Giles A. Lutz Gun Rich (1962)
- F-173 SF James White Second Ending / Samuel R. Delany The Jewels of Aptor (1962)
- F-176 WE Dan J. Stevens Gun Trap At Bright Water / Ray Hogan The Outside Gun (1963)
- F-177 SF Terry Carr Warlord of Kor / Robert Moore Williams The Star Wasps (1963)
- F-184 WE Nelson C. Nye Death Valley Slim / The Kid From Lincoln County (1963)
- F-185 SF Jack Vance The Five Gold Bands / The Dragon Masters (1963)
- F-186 WE William O. Turner The High Hander / Louis Trimble Wild Horse Range (1963) (may be misprinted as F-185 on some copies)
- F-187 SF Leigh Brackett Alpha Centauri or Die! / G. MacDonald Wallis Legend of Lost Earth (1963)
- F-195 SF Robert Silverberg The Silent Invaders / William F. Temple Battle on Venus (1963)
- F-196 WE Harry Whittington Dry Gulch Town / Prairie Raiders (1963)
- F-199 SF John Brunner (as Keith Woodcott) The Psionic Menace / Samuel R. Delany Captives of the Flame (1963)
- F-200 WE Tom West Triggering Texan / Brian Garfield (as Frank Wynne) The Big Snow (1963)
- F-208 WE L. P. Holmes Side Me At Sundown / The Buzzards Of Rocky Pass
- F-209 SF Ken Bulmer The Wizard of the Starship Poseidon / Poul Anderson Let The Spacemen Beware! (1963)
- F-214 WE Louis Trimble The Man From Colorado / Bill Burchardt The Wildcatters (1963)
- F-215 SF John Brunner Listen! The Stars / Jane Roberts The Rebellers (1963)
- F-223 SF Keith Laumer Envoy to New Worlds / Robert Moore Williams Flight From Yesterday (1963)
- F-224 WE Nelson Nye Bancroft's Banco / The Seven Six-Gunners (1963)
- F-227 SF John Brunner The Astronauts Must Not Land / The Space-Time Juggler (1963)
- F-229 MY Louis Trimble The Dead And The Deadly / Bob McKnight Homicide Handicap (1963)
- F-230 WE Tom West Lobo Lawman / Ray Hogan Trail Of The Fresno Kid (1963)
- F-237 SF A. Bertram Chandler The Ship From Outside / Beyond the Galactic Rim (1963)
- F-238 WE Stephen Payne Brand Him Outlaw / Gordon D. Shirreffs Quicktrigger (1963)
- F-242 SF John Brunner The Rites of Ohe / Castaway World (1963)
- F-244 WE Ray Hogan Last Gun At Cabresto / Edwin Booth Valley Of Violence (1962)
- F-249 SF L. Sprague de Camp The Hand of Zei/The Search for Zei (1963)
- F-250 WE Barry Cord The Masked Gun / Tom West Gallows Gulch (1963)
- F-253 SF Robert Silverberg (as Calvin M. Knox) One of Our Asteroids is Missing / A. E. van Vogt The Twisted Men (1964)
- F-254 WE Philip Ketchum The Ghost Riders / William Heuman Hardcase Halloran (1964)
- F-260 WE Louis Trimble Trouble At Gunsight / Brian Garfield Trail Drive
- F-261 SF Samuel R. Delany The Towers of Toron / Robert M. Williams The Lunar Eye (1964)
- F-264 WE Ben Elliott Contract In Cartridges / Tom West Don't Cross My Line (1964)
- F-265 SF Jack Vance The Houses of Iszm / Son of The Tree (1964)
- F-272 WE Ray Hogan The Man From Barranca Negra / Stephen Payne No Job For A Cowboy (1964)
- F-273 SF Marion Zimmer Bradley Falcons of Narabedla / The Dark Intruder (1964)
- F-275 SF Philip E. High No Truce With Terra / Murray Leinster The Duplicators (1964)
- F-276 WE Brian Garfield (as Brian Wynne) Mr. Six Gun / William E. Vance The Wolf Slayer (1964)
- F-284 WE Lin Searles Border Passage / Ben Smith The Homesteader (1964)
- F-285 SF Fritz Leiber Ships to the Stars / Ken Bulmer The Million Year Hunt (1964)
- F-289 SF Ken Bulmer Demons' World / Tom Purdom I Want the Stars (1964)
- F-292 WE Gordon D. Shirreffs The Hidden Rider Of Dark Mountain / Tom West The Man At Rope's End (1964)
- F-298 WE Nelson Nye Treasure Trail From Tucson / Sudden Country (1964)
- F-299 SF John Brunner Endless Shadow/ Gardner Fox The Arsenal of Miracles (1964)

== M Series ==
- M-100 WE John Callahan A Man Named Raglan / Barry Cord Gun Junction (1964)
- M-101 SF Leigh Brackett The Secret of Sinharat / People of the Talisman (1964)
- M-102 WE Ray Hogan Hoodoo Guns / Rod Patterson Trouble At Hangdog Flats (1964)
- M-103 SF Fred Saberhagen The Golden People / Lan Wright Exile From Xanadu (1964)
- M-104 WE Tom West Sidewinder Showdown / Dan J. Stevens Land Beyond The Law
- M-105 SF Margaret St. Clair Message From the Eocene / Three Worlds of Futury (1964)
- M-106 WE Reese Sullivan The Blind Trail / Tim Kelly Ride Of Fury (1964)
- M-107 SF A. Bertram Chandler The Coils of Time / Into The Alternate Universe (1964)
- M-108 WE Rod Patterson Gunfire Heritage / Wayne C. Lee Warpath West (1965)
- M-109 SF G. C. Edmondson Stranger Than You Think / The Ship That Sailed the Time Stream (1965)
- M-110 WE Tom West Bushwack Brand / Merle Constiner Wolf On Horseback (1965)
- M-111 SF Edmond Hamilton Fugitive of the Stars / Kenneth Bulmer Land Beyond the Map (1965)
- M-112 WE Nelson Nye Rogue's Rendezvous / Gun Feud At Tiedown
- M-113 SF Damon Knight Off Center / The Rithian Terror (1965)
- M-114 WE Brian Garfield (as Frank Wynne) Lynch Law Canyon / Stephen Payne Stampede On Farway Pass
- M-115 SF John Brunner The Repairmen of Cyclops / Enigma From Tantalus (1965)
- M-117 SF Bruce W. Ronald Our Man in Space / Jack Sharkey Ultimatum in 2050 A.D. (1965)
- M-118 WE Merle Constiner Guns At Q Cross / Tom West The Toughest Town In The Territory (1965)
- M-120 WE Nelson Nye Ambush At Yuma's Chimney / John Callahan Ride The Wild Land (1965)
- M-121 SF Emil Petaja Alpha Yes, Terra No! / Samuel R. Delany The Ballad of Beta-2 (1965)
- M-122 WE Roger G. Spellman Tall For A Texan / William Vance Outlaw Brand (1965)
- M-123 SF John Brunner The Altar on Asconel / Ted White Android Avenger (1965)
- M-124 WE Stephen Payne Trail Of The Vanishing Ranchers / Tom West Battle At Rattlesnake Pass (1965)
- M-125 SF Jack Vance Monsters in Orbit / The World Between and Other Stories (1965)
- M-126 WE Harry Whittington Valley Of Savage Men / Ben Elliott Brother Badman (1965)
- M-127 SF John Rackham We, The Venusians / Fred Saberhagen The Water of Thought (1965)
- M-128 WE Brian Garfield (as Brian Wynne) The Night It Rained Bullets / Reese Sullivan Nemesis Of Circle A (1965)
- M-129 SF A. Bertram Chandler The Alternate Martians / A. Bertram Chandler Empress of Outer Space (1965)
- M-130 WE John Callahan Half-Injun, Half-Wildcat / Clement Hardin Outcast Of Ute Bend (1965)
- M-131 SF Kenneth Bulmer Behold The Stars / Mack Reynolds Planetary Agent X (1965)
- M-133 SF A. Bertram Chandler Space Mercenaries / Emil Petaja The Caves of Mars (1965)
- M-134 WE Tom West Lost Loot Of Kittycat Ranch / Lin Searles Saddle The Wind (1965)
- M-135 SF Philip E. High The Mad Metropolis / Murray Leinster Space Captain (1966)
- M-136 WE Ray Hogan Panhandle Pistolero / Nelson Nye The Marshall Of Pioche (1966)
- M-138 WE Brian Garfield (as Frank Wynne) Call Me Hazard / Dean Owens The Rincon Trap (1966)
- M-139 SF Samuel R. Delany Empire Star / Tom Purdom The Tree Lord of Imeton (1966)
- M-140 WE Reese Sullivan Deadly Like A .45 / Barry Cord Last Stage To Gomorrah (1966)
- M-141 SF Jack Vance The Brains of Earth / The Many Worlds of Magnus Ridolph (1966)

== G Series ==
- G-501 MY Charlotte Armstrong Lewi (as Charlotte Armstrong) Incident At A Corner / The Unsuspected (1965)
- G-503 MY Ursula Curtiss The Face Of The Tiger / The Stairway (1962)
- G-506 MY Doris Miles Disney Black Mail / Did She Fall Or Was She Pushed?
- G-508 MY Ruth Fenisong The Schemers / But Not Forgotten (1965)
- G-509 MY Elisabeth Sanxay Holding The Virgin Huntress / The Innocent Mrs. Duff (1951)
- G-511 MY Charlotte Armstrong Lewi (as Charlotte Armstrong) The Chocolate Cobweb / Who's Been Sitting In My Chair? (1965)
- G-512 MY Elisabeth S. Holding The Blank Wall / The Girl Who Had To Die (1965)
- G-513 MY Charlotte Armstrong Lewi (as Charlotte Armstrong) Then Came Two Women / Catch As Catch Can (1965)
- G-518 MY Helen Reilly Follow Me / The Opening Door (1965)
- G-519 MY Elisabeth Sanxay Holding The Old Battle Axe / The Obstinate Murderer (1965)
- G-521 MY Charlotte Armstrong Lewi (as Charlotte Armstrong) Mischief / The Better To Eat You (1965)
- G-523 MY Ursula Curtiss The Forbidden Garden / Hours To Kill (1965)
- G-524 MY Elisabeth Sanxay Holding Who's Afraid? / Widow's Mite (1965)
- G-525 MY Dana Lyon The Tentacles / Spin The Web Tight (1965)
- G-526 MY Charlotte Armstrong Lewi (as Charlotte Armstrong) The Mark Of The Hand / The Dream Walker (1965)
- G-528 MY Helen Reilly Certain Sleep / Ding Dong Bell (1965)
- G-529 MY Dorothy Miles Disney Unappointed Rounds / Mrs. Meeker's Money (1965)
- G-530 MY Elisabeth Sanxay Holding The Unfinished Crime / Net Of Cobwebs (1963)
- G-531 MY Helen Reilly Not Me, Inspector / The Canvas Dagger (1965)
- G-533 MY Charlotte Armstrong Lewi (as Charlotte Armstrong) The Black-Eyed Stranger / The One-Faced Girl (1965)
- G-534 MY Elisabeth Sanxay Holding Kill Joy / Speak Of The Devil (1965)
- G-535 MY Dana Lyon The Lost One / The Frightened Child (1965)
- G-539 MY Hilda Lawrence Duet In Death: Composition For Four Hands / Duet In Death: The House (1965)
- G-543 MY Mildred Davis The Dark Place / They Buried A Man (1965)
- G-573 WE Tom West Rattlesnake Range / Merle Constiner Top Gun From The Dakotas (1966)
- G-574 SF Avram Davidson The Kar-Chee Reign / Ursula K. Le Guin Rocannon's World (1966)
- G-576 SF John Rackham Danger From Vega / Avram Davidson Clash of Star-Kings (1966)
- G-577 WE Roger Spellman Big Man From The Brazos / Ray Hogan Killer's Gun (1966)
- G-579 WE Lee E. Wells Ride A Dim Trail / Louis Trimble Showdown In The Cayuse (1966)
- G-580 SF Mack Reynolds Dawnman Planet / Claude Nunes Inherit the Earth (1966)
- G-584 WE William E. Vance Son Of A Desparado / Dwight Bennett Newton (as Clement Hardin) The Ruthless Breed (1966)
- G-585 SF John W. Campbell The Planeteers / The Ultimate Weapon (1966)
- G-587 WE Lee Hoffman Gunfight At Laramie / Brian Garfield (as Frank Wynne) The Wolf Pack
- G-588 SF Lin Carter The Star Magicians / John Baxter The Off-Worlders (1966)
- G-591 WE Dan J. Stevens Stage To Durango / Tom West Hangrope Heritage (1966)
- G-592 SF John Rackham The Beasts of Kohl / John Brunner A Planet Of Your Own (1966)
- G-596 WE Reese Sullivan The Demanding Land / John Callahan Hackett's Feud (1966)
- G-597 SF Ursula K. Le Guin Planet of Exile / Thomas M. Disch Mankind Under the Leash (1966)
- G-601 WE John L. Shelley The Return Of Bullet Benton / Ray Hogan The Hellsfire Lawman (1966)
- G-602 SF Howard L. Cory The Mind Monsters / Philip K. Dick The Unteleported Man (1966)
- G-606 SF John Rackham Time to Live / Lin Carter The Man Without a Planet (1966)
- G-607 WE Merle Constiner Rain Of Fire / Tom West Bitter Brand (1966)
- G-609 SF Philip E. High Reality Forbidden / A. Bertram Chandler Contraband From Otherspace (1967)
- G-610 WE John L. Shelley The Siege At Gunhammer / Frank Wynee The Lusty Breed (1967)
- G-614 SF Walt Richmond & Leigh Richmond Shock Wave / Frederick L. Shaw, Jr. Envoy to the Dog Star (1967)
- G-615 WE Ray Hogan Legacy Of The Slash M / William Vance Tracker (1967)
- G-618 SF Emil Petaja The Stolen Sun / H. Warner Munn The Ship From Atlantis (1967)
- G-619 WE Barry Cord Gallows Ghost / Stephen Payne Room To Swing A Loop
- G-622 WE Tom West Showdown At Serano / Dwight Bennett Newton (as Clement Hardin) The Paxman Feud (1967)
- G-623 SF Philip E. High These Savage Futurians / John Rackham The Double Invaders (1967)
- G-632 SF A. Bertram Chandler Nebula Alert / Mack Reynolds The Rival Rigelians (1967)
- G-633 WE Wayne C. Lee Return To Gunpoint / Dan J. Stevens The Killers From Owl Creek
- G-638 WE Edwin Booth A Time To Shoot / Merle Constiner The Action At Redstone Creek
- G-642 WE Louis Trimble Standoff At Massacre Buttes / Kyle Hollingshead Echo Of A Texas Rifle (1967)
- G-648 WE William Vance The Raid At Crazyhorse / Tom West Crossfire At Barbed M (1967)
- G-659 WE Dwight Bennett Newton (as Clement Hardin) The Oxbow Deed / John Callahan Kincaid (1967)
- G-668 WE Brian Garfield (as Brian Wynne) A Badge For A Badman / Ray Hogan Devil's Butte (1967)
- G-674 WE William Vance No Man's Brand / Merle Constiner Two Pistols South Of Deadwood (1967)
- G-682 WE John Callahan Ride For Vengeance / Tom West Bandit Brand
- G-687 WE Dan J. Stevens Stranger In Rampart / Eric Allen The Hanging At Whiskey Smith
- G-698 WE Ray Hogan Trouble At Tenkiller / Kyle Hollingshead The Franklin Raid (1968)
- G-705 WE Barry Cord The Long Wire / Merle Constiner Killers' Corral (1968)
- G-710 WE Tom West The Face Behind The Mask / Louis Trimble Marshall Of Sangaree (1968)
- G-721 WE Don P. Jenison The Silver Concho / Lee Hoffman Dead Man's Gold (1968)
- G-723 SF Andre Norton Star Hunter / Voodoo Planet (1968)
- G-727 WE John Callahan Tracks Of The Hunter / Clay Ringold Return To Rio Fuego (1968)
- G-732 WE Reese Sullivan The Trouble Borrower / Dwight Bennett Newton (as Clement Hardin) Ambush Reckoning (1968)
- G-742 WE Tom West Write His Name In Gunsmoke / Dean Owens Lone Star Roundup (1968)
- G-747 WE Ray Hogan Killer On The Warbucket / Dean Owen Sage Tower (1968)
- G-755 WE Wayne C. Lee Trail Of The Skulls / Merle Constiner The Four From Gila Bend (1968)
- G-760 WE Reese Sullivan The Vengeance Ghost / X.X. Jones Bronc (1968)
- G-764 WE Louis Trimble West To The Pecos / John Callahan Jernigan Jernigan (1968)

== H Series ==
- H-20 SF Kenneth Bulmer The Key to Irunium / Alan Schwartz The Wandering Tellurian (1967)
- H-21 SF Jack Vance The Last Castle / Tony Russell Wayman World Of The Sleeper (1967)
- H-22 SF Tom Purdom Five Against Arlane / Emil Petaja Lord of the Green Planet (1967)
- H-27 SF Juanita Coulson Crisis on Cheiron / E. C. Tubb The Winds of Gath (1967)
- H-29 SF Walt Richmond and Leigh Richmond The Lost Millennium / A. Bertram Chandler The Road to the Rim (1967)
- H-34 SF Mack Reynolds Computer War / E. C. Tubb Death is a Dream (1967)
- H-36 SF Emil Petaja Tramontane / Michael Moorcock The Wrecks Of Time (1967)
- H-40 SF E. C. Tubb C.O.D. Mars / John Rackham Alien Sea (1968)
- H-48 SF Ellen Wobig The Youth Monopoly / Lan Wright The Pictures Of Pavanne (1968)
- H-51 SF John M. Faucette Crown Of Infinity / Emil Petaja The Prism (1968)
- H-56 SF Ernest Hill Pity About Earth / R. A. Lafferty Space Chantey (1968)
- H-59 SF Philip E. High The Time Mercenaries / Louis Trimble Anthropol (1968)
- H-65 SF Mack Reynolds Mercenary From Tomorrow / Kenneth Bulmer The Key to Venudine (1968)
- H-70 SF Dean R. Koontz Star Quest / Emil Petaja Doom of the Green Planet (1968)
- H-77 SF Juanita Coulson The Singing Stones / E. C. Tubb Derai (1968)
- H-85 SF Philip E. High Invader on My Back / Donald A. Wollheim (as David Grinnell) and Lin Carter Destination: Saturn (1968)
- H-91 SF Laurence M. Janifer and S.J. Treibich Target Terra / John Rackham The Proxima Project (1968)
- H-95 SF Clifford D. Simak So Bright the Vision / Jeff Sutton The Man Who Saw Tomorrow (1968)
- H-103 SF Mack Reynolds Code Duello / John M. Faucette The Age of Ruin (1968)

== Numbered series ==
- 01685 SF Gordon R. Dickson Alien Art / Arcturus Landing
- 04612 WE Tom West Bad Blood At Bonita Basin / Tom West Rattlesnake Range (1972)
- 05595 SF Ken Bulmer Electric Sword Swallowers / John Rackham Beyond Capella (February 1971)
- 06612 SF Mack Reynolds Blackman's Burden / Border, Breed Nor Birth (August 1972)
- 06707 SF Brian M. Stableford The Blind Worm / Emil Petaja Seed of the Dreamers (February 1970)
- 06760 WE C. Hall Thompson The Killing Of Hallie James / Ray Hogan The Bloodrock Valley War (1969)
- 08560 WE Louis Trimble Siege At High Meadow / Tom West The Buzzard's Nest (1973)
- 09135 WE Clay Ringold The Hooded Gun / Sam Bowie Canyon War (1969)
- 00990 SF Susan K. Putney Against Arcturus / Dean R. Koontz Time Thieves (May 1972)
- 10293 SF John Rackham Earthstrings / Ken Bulmer The Chariots of Ra (July 1972)
- 10665 WE Giles A. Lutz The Challenger / Tom West The Phantom Pistoleer (1960)
- 11182 SF Ron Goulart Clockwork Pirates / Ghost Breaker (March 1971)
- 11451 SF A. Bertram Chandler Coils of Time / Into The Alternate Universe (November 1972)
- 11530 WE Louis Trimble The Lonesome Mountains / Dwight Bennett Newton (as Clement Hardin) Colt Wages (1970)
- 11555 SF A. Bertram Chandler The Commodore at Sea / Spartan Planet
- 11556 SF A. Bertram Chandler The Commodore at Sea / Spartan Planet (same cover as 11555–1)
- 11560 SF Suzette Haden Elgin The Communipaths / Louis Trimble The Noblest Experiment (October 1970)
- 11650 SF Mack Reynolds Computer War / Code Duello (February 1973)
- 11705 SF Robert Silverberg Conquerors From the Darkness / Master of Life and Death
- 11738 WE Dan J. Stevens Hunter's Moon / Tom West Corral This Killer (1973)
- 11785 WE Phillip Ketchum The Cougar Basin War / Louis Trimble Trouble Valley
- 12140 SF Brian M. Stableford Cradle of the Sun / Ken Bulmer The Wizards of Senchuria (August 1969)
- 13783 SF A. Bertram Chandler The Dark Dimensions / Alternate Orbits (May 1971)
- 13793 SF Dean R. Koontz Soft Come the Dragons / Dark of the Woods (November 1970)
- 13805 SF John Rackham Dark Planet / Nick Kamin The Herod Men (June 1971)
- 14193 WE Nelson Nye Death Valley Slim /The Kid From Lincoln County
- 14195 WE Kyle Hollingshead Ransome's Debt / Merle Constiner Death Waits At Dakins Station (1970)
- 14250 SF Mack Reynolds Depression Or Bust / Dawnman Planet (October 1973)
- 14265 WE Norman Daniels The Plunderers / Tom West Desperado Doublecross (1970)
- 15697 SF Philip K. Dick The Unteleported Man / Dr. Futurity (September 1972)
- 15890 SF A. Bertram Chandler The Rim of Space / Marion Zimmer Bradley The Door Through Space (February 1972)
- 16640 SF Jack Vance The Dragon Masters / The Five Gold Bands (April 1972)
- 16641 SF Jack Vance The Dragon Masters / The Last Castle (April 1973)
- 17000 WE Reese Sullivan The Deadly Deputy / Dan J. Stevens The Dry Fork Incident (1969)
- 17235 WE Don P. Jenison South To New Range / Clay Ringold Duel In Lagrima Valley (1970)
- 20571 SF Samuel R. Delany The Ballad of Beta-2 / Empire Star (November 1973)
- 22576 SF Marion Zimmer Bradley Falcons of Narabedla / The Dark Intruder & Other Stories (December 1972)
- 22600 SF Dean R. Koontz The Fall Of The Dream Machine / Kenneth Bulmer The Star Venturers (January 1969)
- 23140 SF Dean R. Koontz Fear That Man / E. C. Tubb Toyman (May 1969)
- 23775 SF Barry N. Malzberg (as K.M. O'Donnell) Final War and Other Fantasies / John Rackham Treasure of Tau Ceti October 1969)
- 24035 SF Mack Reynolds The Five Way Secret Agent / Mercenary from Tomorrow (December 1973)
- 24100 SF John Rackham Flower of Doradil / Jeremy Strike A Promising Planet (May 1970)
- 24890 SF H. Beam Piper Four-Day Planet / Lone Star Planet
- 24892 SF H. Beam Piper Four-Day Planet / H. Beam Piper and John J. McGuire Lone Star Planet
- 24925 WE Merle Constiner The Fourth Gunman / Tom West Slick On The Draw
- 27235 SF Walt Richmond and Leigh Richmond Gallagher's Glacier / Positive Charge (April 1970)
- 27251 WE Barry Cord Gallows Ghost / The Long Wire (1967)
- 27376 WE Tom West Gallows Gulch / The Man At Rope's End (1964)
- 27400 SF Neal Barrett, Jr. The Gates of Time / Barry N. Malzberg (as K.M. O'Donnell) Dwellers of the Deep (December 1970)
- 27415 SF Barry N. Malzberg (as K.M. O'Donnell) Gather in the Hall of Planets / In the Pocket and Other S-F Stories (September 1971)
- 30300 SF Fritz Leiber The Green Millennium / Night Monsters (March 1969)
- 30701 WE Nelson Nye Rogue's Rendezvous / Gun Feud At Tiedown (1965)
- 30850 WE Tom West Black Buzzards Of Bueno / Ben Smith The Guns Of Sonora (1969)
- 31739 WE Edwin Booth Hardesty / Reese Sullivan The Stranger (1972)
- 31755 SF A. Bertram Chandler The Hard Way Up / Robert Lory The Veiled World (October 1972)
- 32718 WE Barry Cord Hell In Paradise Valley / Clay Ringold The Night Hell's Corners Died
- 33460 WE Louis Trimble Wild Horse Range / William O. Turner The High Hander (1963)
- 33710 SF Neal Barrett Jr. Highwood / Barrington Bayley Annihilation Factor (January 1972)
- 37062 SF A. Bertram Chandler The Inheritors / The Gateway to Never (June 1972)
- 37063 SF A. Bertram Chandler The Inheritors / The Gateway to Never
- 37064 SF A. Bertram Chandler The Inheritors / The Gateway to Never
- 37108 SF A. Bertram Chandler Into the Alternate Universe / Contraband From Otherspace
- 37109 SF A. Bertram Chandler Into the Alternate Universe / Contraband From Otherspace
- 37130 SF Robert Silverberg Invaders From Earth / To Worlds Beyond
- 37250 SF Marion Zimmer Bradley The Brass Dragon / John Rackham Ipomoea (April 1969)
- 37365 SF Robert E. Howard The Iron Man / The Adventures of Dennis Dorgan
- 38500 WE Kyle Hollingshead Ransome's Move / L. L. Foreman Jemez Brand (1971)
- 42800 SF E. C. Tubb Kalin/ Alex Dain The Bane of Kanthos (September 1969)
- 42900 SF Lin Carter Tower Of The Medusa / George H. Smith Kar Kaballa (November 1969)
- 47200 WE L. L. Foreman Last Stand Mesa / Phillip Ketchum Mad Morgan's Hoard (1969)
- 48245 SF John T. Phillifent Life With Lancelot / William Barton Hunting on Kunderer (August 1973)
- 48755 WE Tom West Lobo Of Lynx Valley / Louis Trimble The Ragbag Army (1971)
- 48885 WE Brian Garfield (as Brian Wynne) Gunslick Territory / John Callahan Loner With A Gun (1973)
- 49252 SF Philip José Farmer Lord of the Trees / The Mad Goblin (May 1970)
- 49301 WE Lin Searles Saddle In The Wind / Tom West Lost Loot Of Kittycat Ranch (1965)
- 51375 SF Philip José Farmer The Mad Goblin / Philip José Farmer Lord of the Trees (September 1970)
- 52035 WE Eric Allen Marshall From Whiskey Smith / Gene Tuttle Imposters In Mesquite
- 52180 SF Robert Lory A Harvest Of Hoodwinks / Masters Of The Lamp (July 1970)
- 53415 SF John T. Phillifent Hierarchies / Doris Piserchia Mister Justice (May 1973)
- 53540 WE William E. Vance The Wolf Slayer / Brian Garfield (as Brian Wynne) Mr. Sixgun (1954)
- 57140 WE Ray Hogan New Gun For Kingdom City / The Shotgunner
- 57601 WE Reese Sullivan Nemesis Of Circle A / Brian Garfield (as Brian Wynne) The Night It Rained Bullets (1965)
- 58601 WE Merle Constiner Two Pistols South Of Deadwood / William Vance No Man's Brand
- 58880 SF Sam Lundwall Alice's World / No Time For Heroes (January 1971)
- 60990 WE Reese Sullivan Man On The Run / John Callahan Odds Against The Texan (1971)
- 65874 SF Robert Sheckley The People Trap / Mindswap
- 66093 SF Clark Darlton The Stolen Spacefleet / Kurt Mahr Sgt. Robot
- 66094 SF William Voltz Seeds of Ruin / K. H. Scheer Planet Mechanica
- 66095 SF Clark Darlton Heritage of the Lizard People / Kurt Mahr Death's Demand
- 66096 SF Kurt Brand Saboteurs in A-1 / William Voltz The Psycho Duel
- 66097 SF K. H. Scheer Savior of the Empire / Clark Darlton The Shadows Attack
- 66098 SF W. W. Shols The Wasp Men Attack / Ernest Vlcek Atlan #1: Spider Desert
- 66099 SF Kurt Mahr Menace of Atomigeddon / Clark Darlton Atlan #2: Flight from Tarkihl
- 66121 SF W. W. Shols Robot Threat: New York / Hans Kneifel Atlan #3: Pale Country Pursuit
- 66128 SF K. H. Scheer Atlan #4: The Crystal Prince / Clark Darlton Atlan #5: War of the Ghosts
- 66160 SF Nick Kamin Earthrim / Walt Richmond and Leigh Richmond Phoenix Ship (December 1969)
- 66525 SF Murray Leinster The Mutant Weapon / Pirates of Zan (October 1971)
- 66995 SF Mack Reynolds The Rival Rigelians / Planetary Agent X (September 1973)
- 67021 SF Marion Zimmer BradleyThe Planet Savers / The Sword of Aldones
- 67025 SF Marion Zimmer BradleyThe Planet Savers / The Sword of Aldones
- 67026 SF Marion Zimmer BradleyThe Planet Savers / The Sword of Aldones
- 67027 SF Marion Zimmer BradleyThe Planet Savers / The Sword of Aldones
- 67580 WE Ray Hogan The Vengeance Gun / L. L. Foreman Powdersmoke Partners (1973)
- 68310 SF John Glasby Project Jove / Ken Bulmer The Hunters of Jundagai (August 1971)
- 70350 WE Nelson Nye Hideout Mountain / Rafe (1962)
- 71082 SF Claudia Nunes and Rhoda Nunes Recoil / E. C. Tubb Lallia (April 1971)
- 71372 WE Louis Trimble The Hostile Peaks / Tom West Renegade Roundup (1969)
- 72260 WE Gordon D. Shirreffs Quicktrigger / Rio Desperado
- 72360 WE John Callahan Ride The Wild Land / Jernigan (1965)
- 72400 SF A. Bertram Chandler The Rim Gods / Laurence M. Janifer The High Hex (February 1969)
- 72401 SF A. Bertram Chandler The Dark Dimension / The Rim Gods
- 72402 SF A. Bertram Chandler The Rim of Space / The Ship From Outside
- 72403 SF A. Bertram Chandler The Dark Dimension / The Rim Gods (August 1978)
- 72525 WE Brian Garfield (as Frank Wynne) Call Me Hazard / Dean Owen The Rincon Trap (1966)
- 73100 SF A. Bertram Chandler The Road to the Rim / The Hard Way Up
- 73101 SF A. Bertram Chandler The Road to the Rim / The Hard Way Up
- 73102 SF A. Bertram Chandler The Road to the Rim / The Hard Way Up
- 73390 SF Avram Davidson The Kar-Chee Reign / Rogue Dragon
- 74180 WE Barry Cord Desert Knights / The Running Iron Samaritans (1973)
- 75150 WE Ray Hogan Track The Man Down / Lee. E. Wells Savage Range (1965)
- 75520 WE Tom West Scorpion Showdown / Clay Ringold Reckoning In Fire Valley (1969)
- 75781 SF Leigh Brackett The Secret of Sinharat / Leigh Brackett People of the Talisman (November 1971)
- 75968 WE Nelson Nye Bancroft's Banco / The Seven Six-Gunners (1963)
- 76096 SF Jeff Sutton Altons Unguessable / Ken Bulmer The Ships of Durostorum (June 1970)
- 76380 SF William F. Temple Battle on Venus / William F. Temple The Three Suns of Amara (June 1973)
- 76900 WE Dean Owens The Skull Riders / Merle Constiner The Man Who Shot "The Kid" (1969)
- 76960 SF Lester del Rey Badge of Infamy / The Sky is Falling (January 1973)
- 77525 SF Jack Vance Son of the Tree / The Houses of Iszm (December 1971)
- 77710 SF Robert Lory The Eyes Of Bolsk / Mack Reynolds The Space Barbarians (June 1969)
- 77785 SF Eric Frank Russell Six Worlds Yonder 6 unrelated stories. / The Space Willies A spoof on Scientology. (July 1971)
- 77910 WE Dwight Bennett Newton (as Clement Hardin) Stage Line To Rincon / Ray Hogan A Man Called Ryker (1971)
- 77925 WE Stephen Payne Stampede On Farway Pass / Brian Garfield (as Frank Wynne) Lynch Law Canyon (1965)
- 78400 SF John Jakes Mask of Chaos / Barrington Bayley The Star Virus (August 1970)
- 78537 SF Robert Sheckley The Status Civilization / Notions: Unlimited
- 79117 WE Tom West Sweetgrass Valley Showdown / Dean Owen Gun Country (1971)
- 79601 WE Roger Spellman Tall For A Texan / Big Man From The Brazos (1965)
- 79975 SF E. C. Tubb Technos / E. C. Tubb A Scatter of Stardust (March 1972)
- 81237 SF Gordon R. Dickson Time to Teleport / Delusion World
- 81610 SF Donald A. Wollheim (as David Grinnell) To Venus! To Venus! / E. C. Tubb The Jester at Scar (March 1970)
- 81680 SF John Jakes Tonight We Steal The Stars / Laurence M. Janifer and S. J. Treibich The Wagered World (July 1969)
- 81861 WE Merle Constiner Guns At Q Cross / Tom West The Toughest Town In The Territory
- 82101 WE Brian Garfield Trail Drive / Louis Trimble Trouble At Gunsight (1964)
- 82190 WE Harry Whittington A Trap For Sam Dodge / Valley Of Savage Men (1965)
- 82435 WE Barry Cord The Coffin Fillers / Don T. Jenison Trouble On Diamond Seven (1972)
- 83360 WE Barry Cord Two Graves For A Lawman / The Deadly Amigos
- 86465 WE Don P. Jenison Zero Hour At Black Butte / Dwight Bennett Newton (as Clement Hardin) Sherriff Of Sentinel (1969)
- 86495 SF L. Sprague de Camp The Virgin of Zesh / The Tower of Zanid
- 89250 SF Marion Zimmer Bradley The Winds Of Darkover / John Rackham The Anything Tree (January 1970)
- 89301 SF E. C. Tubb Derai / The Winds of Gath (July 1973)
- 89590 WE L. P. Holmes Smoky Pass / L. P. Holmes Wolf Brand (1962)
- 93900 SF Ross Rocklynne The Sun Destroyers / Edmond Hamilton A Yank at Valhalla (March 1973)

== See also ==
- Belmont Double novels – a later series of science fiction doubles published by Belmont Books between 1967 and 1969
- Tor Double Novels – a later series of science fiction doubles published by Tor Books between 1988 and 1991
