= List of Ace western letter-series single titles =

Ace Books have published hundreds of western titles, starting in 1952. Most of these were Ace Doubles (dos-à-dos format), but they also published a few single volumes. Between 1952 and 1968, the books had a letter-series identifier; after that date they were given five digit numeric serial numbers. There were a total of 159 letter-series western titles.

The list given here gives a date of publication; in all cases this refers to the date of publication by Ace, and not the date of original publication of the novels. For more information about the history of these titles, see Ace Books, which includes a discussion of the serial numbering conventions used and an explanation of the letter-code system.

== D, G and S Series ==
- S-060 WE Samuel Peeples (as Brad Ward) The Marshal Of Medicine Bend (1954)
- S-082 WE Louis L'Amour Kilkenny
- S-148 WE Samuel Peeples (as Brad Ward) The Man From Andersonville (1956)
- D-206 WE Robert Hardy Andrews Great Day In The Morning (1957)
- D-395 WE Allan Keller Thunder At Harper's Ferry (1959)
- D-466 WE Richard O'Conner Wild Bill Hickok (1960)
- D-475 WE Samuel Peeples (as Brad Ward) The Marshal of Medicine Bend
- G-480 WE John Brick The Strong Men (1960)
- D-494 WE Leslie T. White Log Jam (1961)
- G-500 WE George D. Hendricks The Bad Man of the West (1961)
- D-570 WE L. L. Foreman Spanish Grant (1963)
- D-572 WE Brian Garfield (as Frank Wynne) Arizona Rider
- D-573 WE Louis Trimble (as Stuart Brock) Whispering Canyon (1963)
- D-574 WE Louis L'Amour Kilkenny (1954)
- D-578 WE Brian Garfield The Lawbringers (1963)
- D-588 WE Merle Constiner Short Trigger Man
- D-590 WE Lin Searles Stampede At Hourglass (1964)
- D-592 WE Nelson Nye Gunslick Mountain (1964)
- D-594 WE Louis Trimble The Desperate Deputy of Cougar Hill (1965)
- D-597 WE L. P. Holmes The Hardest Man In The Sierras (1965)

== F Series ==
- F-103 WE Harry Whittington A Trap For Sam Dodge / Lee Floren High Thunder (1961)
- F-106 WE Brian Garfield Justice At Spanish Flat / Tom West The Gun From Nowhere (1961)
- F-110 WE Ray Hogan Track The Man Down / Lee Wells Savage Range (1961)
- F-116 WE Dwight Bennett Newton (as Clement Hardin) The Lurking Gun / Louis Trimble Deadman Canyon (1961)
- F-120 WE Jack M. Brickham Gunman Can't Hide / John Callahan Come In Shooting (1961)
- F-124 WE Steven G. Lawrence Slatterly / Steven G. Lawrence Bullet Welcome For Slatterly (1961)
- F-126 WE Edwin Booth The Troublemaker / Ray Hogan A Marshall For Lawless (1962)
- F-128 WE Tom West The Buzzard's Nest / Louis Trimble Siege At High Meadow (1962)
- F-134 WE Rod Patterson A Shooting At Sundust / Gordon D. Shirreffs Tumbleweed Trigger (1962)
- F-138 WE Steven G. Lawrence Walk A Narrow Trail / Steven G. Lawrence A Noose For Slattery (1962)
- F-142 WE L. P. Holmes Wolf Brand / Smoky Pass (1962)
- F-144 WE Brian Garfield (as Frank Wynne) Massacre Basin / Dwight Bennett Newton (as Clement Hardin) The Badge Shooters (1962)
- F-148 WE Harry Whittington Wild Sky / Tom West Dead Man's Double Cross (1962)
- F-150 WE Nelson Nye Hideout Mountain / Rafe (1962)
- F-152 WE Gordon D. Shirreffs Rio Desperado //Voice Of The Gun (1962)
- F-160 WE Ray Hogan New Gun For Kingdom City / The Shotgunner (1962)
- F-164 WE Steven G. Lawrence Longhorns North / Slattery's Gun Says "No" (1962)
- F-172 WE Tom West Battling Buckeroos / Giles A. Lutz Gun Rich (1962)
- F-176 WE Dan J. Stevens Gun Trap At Bright Water / Ray Hogan The Outside Gun (1963)
- F-184 WE Nelson C. Nye Death Valley Slim / The Kid From Lincoln County (1963)
- F-186 WE William O. Turner The High Hander / Louis Trimble Wild Horse Range (1963) (may be misprinted as F-185 on some copies)
- F-196 WE Harry Whittington Dry Gulch Town / Prairie Raiders (1963)
- F-200 WE Tom West Triggering Texan / Brian Garfield (as Frank Wynne) The Big Snow (1963)
- F-208 WE L. P. Holmes Side Me At Sundown / The Buzzards Of Rocky Pass
- F-214 WE Louis Trimble The Man From Colorado / Bill Burchardt The Wildcatters (1963)
- F-224 WE Nelson Nye Bancroft's Banco / The Seven Six-Gunners (1963)
- F-230 WE Tom West Lobo Lawman / Ray Hogan Trail Of The Fresno Kid (1963)
- F-238 WE Stephen Payne Brand Him Outlaw / Gordon D. Shirreffs Quicktrigger (1963)
- F-244 WE Ray Hogan Last Gun At Cabresto / Edwin Booth Valley Of Violence (1962)
- F-250 WE Barry Cord The Masked Gun / Tom West Gallows Gulch (1963)
- F-252 WE J. C. Bayliss (as John Clifford) The Shooting Of Storey James (1964)
- F-254 WE Philip Ketchum The Ghost Riders / William Heuman Hardcase Halloran (1964)
- F-260 WE Louis Trimble Trouble At Gunsight / Brian Garfield Trail Drive
- F-262 WE Clifton Adams Reckless Men (1964)
- F-264 WE Ben Elliott Contract In Cartridges / Tom West Don't Cross My Line (1964)
- F-266 WE Allan Vaughan Elston Roundup On The Yellowstone
- F-272 WE Ray Hogan The Man From Barranca Negra / Stephen Payne No Job For A Cowboy (1964)
- F-276 WE Brian Garfield (as Brian Wynne) Mr. Six Gun / William E. Vance The Wolf Slayer (1964)
- F-284 WE Lin Searles Border Passage / Ben Smith The Homesteader (1964)
- F-286 WE Jim Bosworth The Long Way North (1964)
- F-290 WE D. B. Olsen Night Of The Bowstring (1954)
- F-292 WE Gordon D. Shirreffs The Hidden Rider Of Dark Mountain / Tom West The Man At Rope's End (1964)
- F-298 WE Nelson Nye Treasure Trail From Tucson / Sudden Country (1964)
- F-300 WE Brian Garfield (as Brian Wynne Garfield) Vultures in the Sun
- F-302 WE Brian Garfield (as Frank Wynne) Dragoon Pass
- F-316 WE Robert McCaig The Burntwood Men (1964)
- F-324 WE Brian Garfield Apache Canyon
- F-336 WE Ernest Hacox Six-Gun Duo (1965)
- F-340 WE John L. Shelley and David Shelley The Relentless Rider (1965)
- F-348 WE Nelson Nye Guns Of Horse Prairie
- F-351 WE Louis Trimble The Holdout In The Diablos
- F-358 WE William Vance The Wild Riders Of Savage Valley (1965)
- F-360 WE L. L. Foreman Rawhiders Of The Brasada (1965)
- F-370 WE Samuel A. Peeples (as Samuel Anthony Peeples) (as Brad Ward) The Man From Andersonville (1965)
- F-376 WE Lewis B. Patten The Odds Against Circle L (1966)
- F-380 WE Lee Hoffman The Legend Of Blackjack Sam (1966)
- F-389 WE William Colt MacDonald Shoot Him On Sight
- F-395 WE Nelson Nye Iron Hand
- F-401 WE Merle Constiner Outrage At Bearskin Forks (1966)
- F-404 WE Clifton Adams The Grabhorn Bounty (1966)
- F-409 WE Lin Searles Cliff Rider (1966)
- F-411 WE L. L. Foreman The Mustang Trail (1966)
- F-415 WE Brian Garfield (as Frank Wynne) The Bravos
- F-418 WE Nelson Nye Single Action (1967)
- F-423 WE Lewis B. Patten Giant On Horseback (1967)
- F-428 WE William Colt Macdonald Mascarada Pass (1967)

== M Series ==
- M-100 WE John Callahan A Man Named Raglan / Barry Cord Gun Junction (1964)
- M-102 WE Ray Hogan Hoodoo Guns / Rod Patterson Trouble At Hangdog Flats (1964)
- M-104 WE Tom West Sidewinder Showdown / Dan J. Stevens Land Beyond The Law
- M-106 WE Reese Sullivan The Blind Trail / Tim Kelly Ride Of Fury (1964)
- M-108 WE Rod Patterson Gunfire Heritage / Wayne C. Lee Warpath West (1965)
- M-110 WE Tom West Bushwack Brand / Merle Constiner Wolf On Horseback (1965)
- M-112 WE Nelson Nye Rogue's Rendezvous / Gun Feud At Tiedown
- M-114 WE Brian Garfield (as Frank Wynne) Lynch Law Canyon / Stephen Payne Stampede On Farway Pass
- M-118 WE Merle Constiner Guns At Q Cross / Tom West The Toughest Town In The Territory (1965)
- M-120 WE Nelson Nye Ambush At Yuma's Chimney / John Callahan Ride The Wild Land (1965)
- M-122 WE Roger G. Spellman Tall For A Texan / William Vance Outlaw Brand (1965)
- M-124 WE Stephen Payne Trail Of The Vanishing Ranchers / Tom West Battle At Rattlesnake Pass (1965)
- M-126 WE Harry Whittington Valley Of Savage Men / Ben Elliott Brother Badman (1965)
- M-128 WE Brian Garfield (as Brian Wynne) The Night It Rained Bullets / Reese Sullivan Nemesis Of Circle A (1965)
- M-130 WE John Callahan Half-Injun, Half-Wildcat / Clement Hardin Outcast Of Ute Bend (1965)
- M-134 WE Tom West Lost Loot Of Kittycat Ranch / Lin Searles Saddle The Wind (1965)
- M-136 WE Ray Hogan Panhandle Pistolero / Nelson Nye The Marshall Of Pioche (1966)
- M-138 WE Brian Garfield (as Frank Wynne) Call Me Hazard / Dean Owens The Rincon Trap (1966)
- M-140 WE Reese Sullivan Deadly Like A .45 / Barry Cord Last Stage To Gomorrah (1966)
- M-144 WE Ernest Haycox Trigger Trio (1966)
- M-158 WE Brian Garfield (as Brian Wynne) The Proud Riders (1966)
- M-160 WE Nelson Nye Trail Of Lost Skulls (C. 1)

== G Series ==
Note that two books with a G serial number, G-480 and G-500, were actually part of the first D/G/S series—see above.

- G-573 WE Tom West Rattlesnake Range / Merle Constiner Top Gun From The Dakotas (1966)
- G-577 WE Roger Spellman Big Man From The Brazos / Ray Hogan Killer's Gun (1966)
- G-579 WE Lee E. Wells Ride A Dim Trail / Louis Trimble Showdown In The Cayuse (1966)
- G-584 WE William E. Vance Son Of A Desparado / Dwight Bennett Newton (as Clement Hardin) The Ruthless Breed (1966)
- G-587 WE Lee Hoffman Gunfight At Laramie / Brian Garfield (as Frank Wynne) The Wolf Pack
- G-591 WE Dan J. Stevens Stage To Durango / Tom West Hangrope Heritage (1966)
- G-596 WE Reese Sullivan The Demanding Land / John Callahan Hackett's Feud (1966)
- G-601 WE John L. Shelley The Return Of Bullet Benton / Ray Hogan The Hellsfire Lawman (1966)
- G-607 WE Merle Constiner Rain Of Fire / Tom West Bitter Brand (1966)
- G-610 WE John L. Shelley The Siege At Gunhammer / Frank Wynee The Lusty Breed (1967)
- G-615 WE Ray Hogan Legacy Of The Slash M / William Vance Tracker (1967)
- G-619 WE Barry Cord Gallows Ghost / Stephen Payne Room To Swing A Loop
- G-622 WE Tom West Showdown At Serano / Dwight Bennett Newton (as Clement Hardin) The Paxman Feud (1967)
- G-628 WE Clifton Adams Shorty (1967)
- G-633 WE Wayne C. Lee Return To Gunpoint / Dan J. Stevens The Killers From Owl Creek
- G-638 WE Edwin Booth A Time To Shoot / Merle Constiner The Action At Redstone Creek
- G-642 WE Louis Trimble Standoff At Massacre Buttes / Kyle Hollingshead Echo Of A Texas Rifle (1967)
- G-648 WE William Vance The Raid At Crazyhorse / Tom West Crossfire At Barbed M (1967)
- G-657 WE Nelson Nye Rider on the Roan (1967)
- G-659 WE Dwight Bennett Newton (as Clement Hardin) The Oxbow Deed / John Callahan Kincaid (1967)
- G-665 WE L. L. Foreman Silver Flame
- G-668 WE Brian Garfield (as Brian Wynne) A Badge For A Badman / Ray Hogan Devil's Butte (1967)
- G-674 WE William Vance No Man's Brand / Merle Constiner Two Pistols South Of Deadwood (1967)
- G-678 WE L. L. Foreman The Plundering Gun
- G-682 WE John Callahan Ride For Vengeance / Tom West Bandit Brand
- G-685 WE Herbert Purdum My Brother John
- G-687 WE Dan J. Stevens Stranger In Rampart / Eric Allen The Hanging At Whiskey Smith
- G-695 WE Theodore V. Olsen Bitter Grass
- G-698 WE Ray Hogan Trouble At Tenkiller / Kyle Hollingshead The Franklin Raid (1968)
- G-704 WE Carse Boyd Navarro (1962)
- G-705 WE Barry Cord The Long Wire / Merle Constiner Killers' Corral (1968)
- G-708 WE Clifton Adams A Partnership With Death (1968)
- G-710 WE Tom West The Face Behind The Mask / Louis Trimble Marshall Of Sangaree (1968)
- G-720 WE Brian Garfield (as Brian Wynne) Brand of the Gun (1968)
- G-721 WE Don P. Jenison The Silver Concho / Lee Hoffman Dead Man's Gold (1968)
- G-726 WE Lee Hoffman The Valdez Horses (1968)
- G-727 WE John Callahan Tracks Of The Hunter / Clay Ringold Return To Rio Fuego (1968)
- G-731 WE Nelson Nye A Lost Mine Named Shelton (1968)
- G-732 WE Reese Sullivan The Trouble Borrower / Dwight Bennett Newton (as Clement Hardin) Ambush Reckoning (1968)
- G-741 WE Wayne D. Overholser and Lewis B. Patten (jointly as Dean Owen) Red Is The Valley (1968)
- G-742 WE Tom West Write His Name In Gunsmoke / Dean Owens Lone Star Roundup (1968)
- G-746 WE William Colt Macdonald Marked Deck At Topango Wells (1968)
- G-747 WE Ray Hogan Killer On The Warbucket / Dean Owen Sage Tower (1968)
- G-754 WE Jack L. Bickham The War On Charity Ross (1968)
- G-755 WE Wayne C. Lee Trail Of The Skulls / Merle Constiner The Four From Gila Bend (1968)
- G-759 WE Giff Cheshire Wenatchee Bend (1968)
- G-760 WE Reese Sullivan The Vengeance Ghost / X.X. Jones Bronc (1968)
- G-763 WE John Shelley and David Shelley Hell-For-Leather Jones (1968)
- G-764 WE Louis Trimble West To The Pecos / John Callahan Jernigan Jernigan (1968)

== K Series ==
- K-107 WE Hugh B. Cave The Cross On The Drum (1959)
- K-247 WE Francis H. Ames That Callahan Spunk! (1965)
