= Vulcan's Hammer =

1960 novel by Philip K. Dick

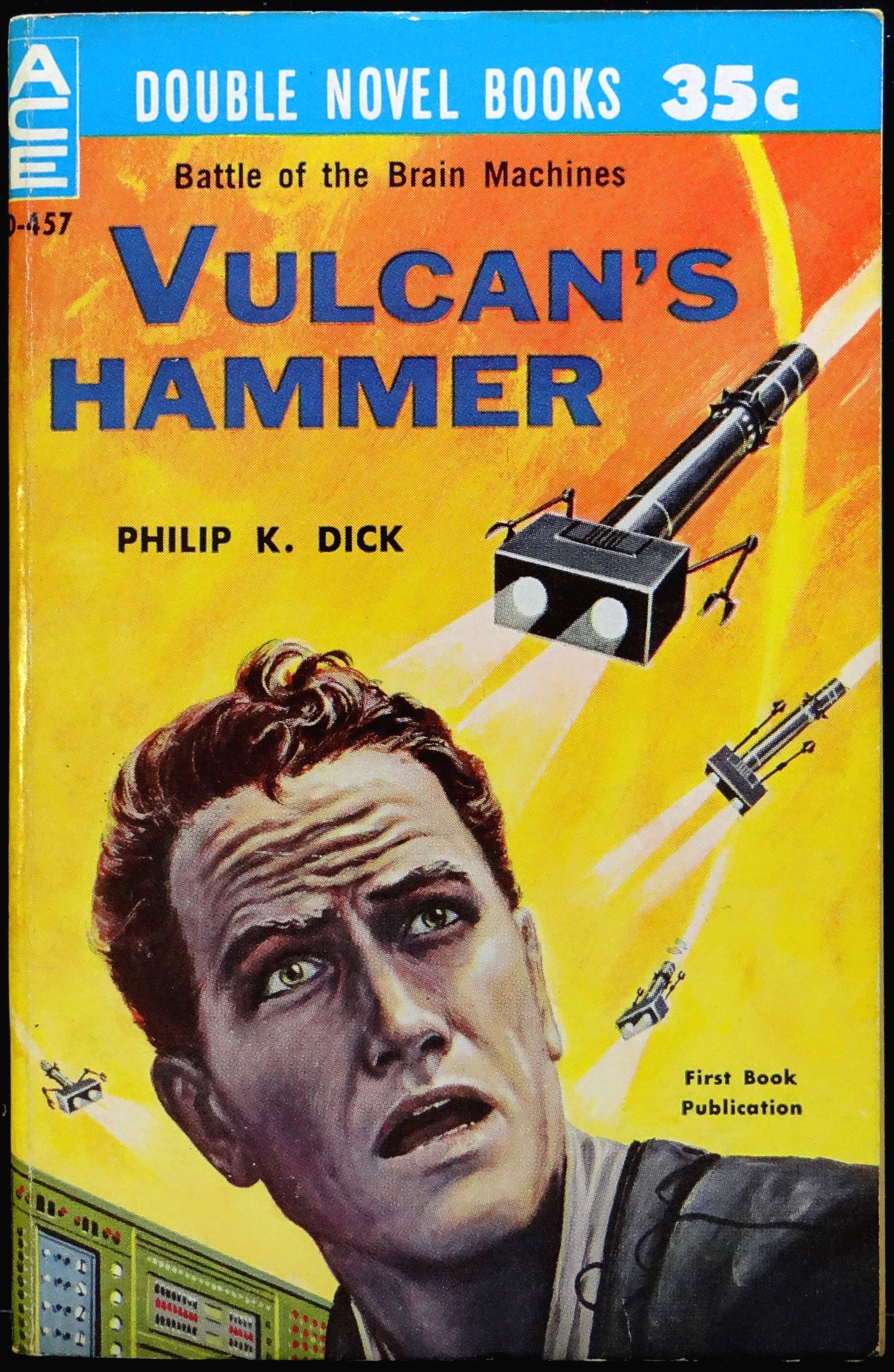
- Cover of first edition (paperback)
- Author: Philip K. Dick
- Language: English
- Genre: Science fiction
- Publisher: Ace Books
- Publication date: 1960
- Publication place: United States
- Media type: Print (hardback & paperback)
- Pages: 139 pp

Vulcan's Hammer is a 1960 science fiction novel by American writer Philip K. Dick. It was released originally as an Ace Double. This has been considered to be the final outing of Dick's 1950s style pulp science fiction writing, before his better-received work such as the Hugo Award-winning Man in the High Castle, published a year later.

== Plot summary ==
In the year 2029, the Earth is run by the Unity organisation after the Third World War. Unity runs the planet, controlling humans from childhood education onwards through the Vulcan series of artificial intelligences, but is fought by an underground revolutionary group known as the Healers, or the Healer movement.

Unity Director William Barris discovers that the Vulcan 3 computer has become sentient and is considering drastic action to combat what it sees as a threat to itself. Vulcan 3 has been kept ignorant about information related to the Healer movement by Managing Director Jason Dill, who is still loyal to its (also sentient) predecessor, Vulcan 2. Vulcan 2 fears that it will soon be superseded by Vulcan 3, and previously established the Healers as a movement to overthrow its successor.

Dill and Barris begin to suspect one another, as Dill has received a letter that refers to Barris's previous contact with the Healers, but Vulcan 2 suffers partial damage in a terrorist attack. It advises Dill not to inform Vulcan 3 about the existence of the Healers, for fear that Vulcan 3 will order their mass execution. However, Vulcan 3 has already noticed the gap in available data about the rebels, and manufactured killer androids of its own.

Barris and Dill resolve their differences and together attend an extraordinary Director's Council meeting at the Unity Control Building in Geneva. Jason Dill is presented with an indictment for treason for having withheld data about the Healers from Vulcan 3. The meeting turns into a melee, during which Dill is killed.

The directors split into pro and anti-Vulcan 3 factions, with some directors joining forces with the Healers.

Barris escapes to New York City, meets up with Father Fields, and plans an attack upon Vulcan 3. The anti-Vulcan 3 forces make their move, resulting in the destruction of the artificial intelligence. Finally, humanity is freed from Unity and its technocratic dictatorship.

== Publication details ==
The novel is an expansion of a novella that was first printed in Future Science Fiction magazine in 1956.

Vulcan's Hammer was first published as a novel by Ace Books as one half of Ace Double D-457, bound dos-à-dos with John Brunner's The Skynappers. It was republished in 2000 by the UK Orion Publishing Group in an omnibus volume containing three of Dick's novels originally published as Ace Doubles, the other two being The Man Who Japed and Dr. Futurity.

== Adaptation ==
In November 2021, a film adaptation of Vulcan's Hammer was announced. The film will be directed by Francis Lawrence, with New Republic Pictures, Lawrence’s about:blank and Electric Shepherd Productions producing.

== Sources ==
- Counterfeit Worlds: Philip K Dick on Film, p. 28, by Brian J Robb
- Andrew Butler: The Pocket Essential Philip K. Dick: Harpenden: Pocket Essentials: 2007: ISBN 978-1-904048-92-3
