= Drobnic =

Drobnic or Drobnič is a South Slavic-language surname. Notable people with the surname include:

- Angie Drobnic Holan, American journalist
- Karl Drobnic
