= Faucette =

Faucette is a surname. Notable people with the surname include:

- Chuck Faucette (born 1963), American football player and coach
- John M. Faucette (1943–2003), American writer
- Mark Faucette (born 1958), American ice hockey referee
