= Vug (disambiguation) =

A vug is a cavity in a rock.

Vug may also refer to:

- A Titanian individual in Philip K. Dick's science fiction novel The Game-Players of Titan
- An acronym for Vivendi Universal Games
- "Vug", a song by Atomic Rooster from the 1970 album Death Walks Behind You
