= The Interpreter (Aldiss novel) =

The Interpreter Bow Down to Nul
- Author: Brian W. Aldiss
- Language: English
- Genre: Science fiction
- Publisher: Ace Books
- Publication date: 1960
- Publication place: United Kingdom
- Media type: Print

The Interpreter is a 1960 science fiction novel by British writer Brian W. Aldiss. It was initially serialized under the title X for Exploitation in three parts in the British magazine New Worlds, beginning in March 1960. Later that year it appeared in book form in the United States as Bow Down to Nul, published by Ace Books as an Ace Double. The novel was subsequently published in the United Kingdom under the title The Interpreter. Subsequent English language reprints used that final title.

It was Aldiss's second novel.

== Plot ==
Earth has been conquered and incorporated into an empire dominated by the Nuls, a huge, three-limbed alien species, and reduced to the status of an insignificant colony. The planet is ruled by a tyrannical Nul governor whose alleged corruption attracts the attention of a Nul Signatory, a senior imperial official roughly equivalent to a prime minister. The signatory travels to Earth to investigate the allegations, but his well-intentioned efforts to uncover the abuses are frustrated by the governor's deceptions. Gary Towler, a human who serves as chief interpreter between the Nuls and Earth's population and is consequently regarded as a pariah by other humans, becomes caught up in the investigation. Towler and several poorly coordinated resistance groups seek to exploit the conflict within the Nul administration as an opportunity to overthrow alien rule and liberate Earth.

== Publication history ==
The novel first appeared as X for Exploitation, serialized in three installments in New Worlds beginning with the March 1960 issue.

Later in 1960, Ace Books published the novel under the title Bow Down to Nul as one half of an Ace Double, paired with The Dark Destroyer by Manly Wade Wellman. A subsequent British edition was issued under the title The Interpreter. The novel has since been reprinted multiple times, usually under the title The Interpreter.

It was included in A Brian Aldiss Omnibus (1969).

The novel has been translated into several languages, including German, Portuguese, Dutch, French, Russian and Polish.

== Reception ==
The novel received reviews in several contemporary and later science-fiction periodicals. S. E. Cotts reviewed it in the October 1960 issue of Amazing Stories. Frederik Pohl reviewed the novel in If, no. 7 (1960); the review was reprinted in the magazine's November 1960 issue. P. Schuyler Miller discussed it in the May 1961 issue of Analog Science Fact → Fiction.

The novel was also reviewed outside the English-language press. Annemarie van Ewijck, writing as Annemarie Kindt, reviewed it in the Dutch magazine Holland-SF, no. 2 (1976), while Jean-Marc Ligny reviewed it in the French magazine Fiction, no. 309 (1980). Polish writer and critic Jacek Inglot reviewed the novel in the fourth issue of Fenix in 1990 (p.134-136).

John Clute and David Pringle in The Encyclopedia of Science Fiction dismissed the novel as one of Aldiss's less successful works.

== Analysis ==
The novel's depiction of colonial rule was informed by Aldiss's experiences while serving in India and Indonesia during the 1940s. Aldiss explained that his interest in galactic empires derived partly from having witnessed the relationship between imperial rulers and subject peoples firsthand, and that in the novel he deliberately placed humanity in the position of a colonized population. He also identified the enormous geographical extent of the Nul empire—and the consequent opportunities for corruption and exploitation—as central to the novel's conflict.
