= Oregon Passage =

1957 film by Paul Landres

- Theatrical poster
- Directed by: Paul Landres
- Screenplay by: Jack DeWitt
- Based on: Rio Bravo by Gordon D. Shirreffs
- Produced by: Lindsley Parsons
- Starring: John Ericson; Lola Albright; Toni Gerry; Edward Platt
- Cinematography: Ellis W. Carter
- Edited by: Maury Wright
- Music by: Paul Dunlap
- Color process: Color by Deluxe
- Production company: Lindsley Parsons Pictures Corporation
- Distributed by: Allied Artists Pictures
- Release date: December 29, 1957
- Running time: 80 minutes
- Country: United States
- Language: English

Oregon Passage is a 1957 American CinemaScope Western film directed by Paul Landres. The movie stars John Ericson, Lola Albright, Toni Gerry and Edward Platt. Its plot follows a clash between an army lieutenant and Shoshoni natives, in the Cascade Mountains region of Oregon, in 1871. It is based on the novel by Gordon D. Shirreffs.

== Plot ==
A cavalry lieutenant becomes the enemy of a Shoshone chief, when he rescues an Indian maiden from the ceremonial camp.

== Cast ==
- John Ericson as Lt. Niles Ord
- Lola Albright as Sylvia Dane
- Toni Gerry as Little Deer
- Edward Platt as Maj. Roland Dane
- Rachel Ames as Marion Erschick (as Judith Ames)
- H.M. Wynant as Black Eagle
- Jon Shepodd as Lt. Baird Dolby
- Walt Barnes as Sgt. Jed Erschick
- Paul Fierro as Nato
- Harvey Stephens as Capt. Boyson

== Production ==
Oregon Passage was shot on location in Bend, Oregon.

== Bibliography ==
- Gevinson, Alan (1997). Within Our Gates: Ethnicity in American Feature Films, 1911-1960. American Film Institute. University of California Press. ISBN 9780520209640.
