= The World Jones Made =

1956 science fiction novel by Philip K. Dick

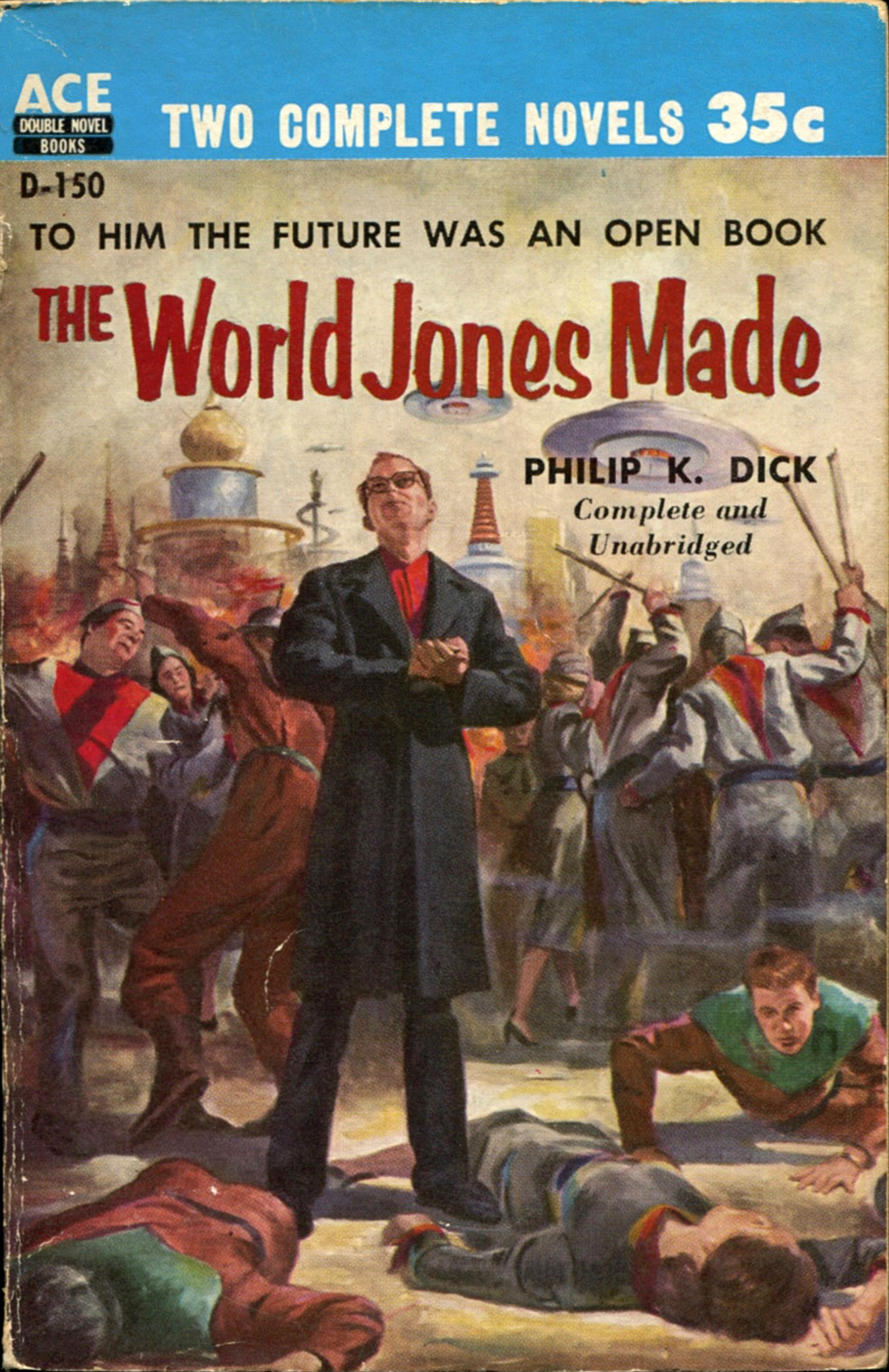
- Cover of first edition (paperback)
- Author: Philip K. Dick
- Language: English
- Genre: Science fiction
- Publisher: Ace Books
- Publication date: 1956
- Publication place: United States
- Media type: Print (hardback & paperback)
- Pages: 192

The World Jones Made is a 1956 science fiction novel by American writer Philip K. Dick, examining notions of precognition, humanity, and politics. It was first published by Ace Books as one half of Ace Double D-150, bound dos-à-dos with Agent of the Unknown by Margaret St. Clair.The story takes place after a nuclear war in which society is dominated by relativism, which rejects absolute truths and preaches tolerance as the highest principle. The mutant Floyd Jones, who can see into the future, plans to overthrow the system and colonise space. The story ends with the defeat of Jones, whose plans fail despite his ability to see the future due to the immutability of fate.

== Plot summary ==
After the Third World War at the beginning of the twenty-first century, the USA is under the control of the authoritarian Fedgov. Radioactivity has caused mutants to develop, but they can no longer exist in the Earth's normal atmosphere. They are cared for in a controlled environment that is tailored to their biological needs. One of the mutants, Louis, who does not believe this, tries to persuade the others to break out. Louis eventually persuades three other young mutants to attempt an escape with him. Meanwhile, Dr Rafferty, the head of the Biosphere, and Fedgov agent Doug Cussick observe the escape attempt. In a flashback, Doug Cussick, then in charge of enforcing relativism, meets fortune teller Floyd Jones at a fair. Jones advertises that he can predict the fate of mankind one year into the future. Jones makes two predictions: Firstly, a nationalist named Ernest T. Saunders will win the next election for the presidency. Secondly, ‘drifters’, beings from another planet, will become an important issue in the future.

Doug Cussick reports the event to his superior, Security Director Pearson. Cussick's report that Jones apparently knew high-level information about the true nature of the Drifters shocks Pearson. If Jones really is a pre-cog, he is not violating relativism by telling the truth about future events. Doug Cussick is transferred to Denmark, where he meets his future wife Nina Longstren, an artist and sceptic of relativism. Cussick informs his wife that Jones' notoriety has been rising since he joined a new religious movement and has been making prophecies about future encounters with aliens. Later, Cussick, Max Kaminski and security director Pearson question Jones. Jones is confident that he will be released in three days. He also reveals that he is afraid of his abilities and where they will lead him. Jones makes it clear that the things he is experiencing are in the past for him and cannot be changed. The agents suggest that Floyd Jones help with a reconstruction project. Jones refuses. He believes that people should aim for the stars instead of clinging to an ‘overpopulated’ Earth. Jones is inspired by the Drifters who are colonising the cosmos. Eventually Pearson confesses that Drifters have already landed on Earth, which in turn confirms the truth of Jones' statements and makes it impossible to arrest him as an offence against relativism. In 2002, despite the ban on harming the Drifters who have landed on Earth, riots break out against them. The situation with Jones and his movement worsens. Drifters are being killed despite the laws, and his movement is becoming more and more powerful. Kaminski realises that the Drifters are just a means for Jones to gain support. While on a date with some friends in a San Francisco bar, Cussick learns that his wife is a member of the Floyd Jones movement. Doug confronts her, but Nina plays it down. Cussick does not accept this and separates from his wife. The signs that Jones could soon take power become ever clearer, and there are regular marches on the streets.

Their goal is to discover a second Earth through an interstellar crusade. They also call for the Fedgov to be disbanded and for Jones to be appointed commander-in-chief to deal with the crisis. When Cussick returns home, he finds a recorded message from Security Director Pearson, who tells Cussick to return to Secpol's office. At the office, Cussick learns that the Max Kaminski he mentioned has stolen a large amount of secret documents that he was going to deliver to the Jones movement. He was captured and sent to a labour camp in Saskatchewan. Cussick is promoted to take Kaminski's place and is put in charge of the security of Dr Rafferty's secret project. This is an artificial biosphere in which genetically modified mutants are being prepared for life on Venus. Cussick realises that the Fedgov have been planning to colonise other planets for a long time. However, while Jones favours military means, the Fedgov pursues a scientific solution. In the meantime, Floyd Jones holds a rally in which he calls for the expansion of humanity to other systems and condemns the Fedgov's ‘plutocracy’. Pearson is forced to realise that Jones' precognitive abilities make it impossible to defeat him. Cussick and Pearson then travel to San Francisco to meet with Dr Rafferty. On their arrival, Pearson is arrested by Jones' supporters.

At the same time, the genetically modified mutants are on their way to Venus. Some time after the landing of the first eight mutants, the colony thrives. While exploring the surface, the colonists come across a dead drifter. They find another one that has not only survived, but has developed into a zygote. They learn that the drifters are actually pollen from a plant-like creature. On Earth, Floyd Jones learns that human scientists have made the same discovery. The pollen use the planet as a womb before they leave for the interplanetary medium, where they spend their adult lives. Their relationship to Earth is the same as that of the Venus mutants to their home. This also proves that the drifters are not a threat in themselves, something Jones could not have foreseen at first. With this discovery, Jones realises that his movement has failed.

Jones visits Pearson. Jones tells him that his movement is doomed to failure because the plant-like organisms will seal off Earth in response to the violence against the drifters and prevent any further exploration - a simple natural containment of a threat. Jones offers Pearson his old position as head of security, but Pearson refuses. Cussick devises a plan to kill Jones. Eventually he makes it to his office. After informing him of Pearson's death, a fight breaks out between Jones and Cussick. In the end, Cussick gains the upper hand and manages to kill him. Shortly afterwards, Cussick returns to his flat, where he notices a tape. When he listens to it, he recognises Jones' voice. Jones tells him that he wanted his own death. He had planned this to save his political reputation. The people would see Jones as a martyr and blame relativism and the Fedgov for his failure. On Venus, the settlers celebrate the first child born on Venus. An artificial biosphere has also been constructed on Venus, simulating an earthly environment for three new arrivals to the planet. These three humans are Doug Cussick, Nina Longstrem and Jackie Cussick.

== Interpretation ==
As with many of Dick's novels, The World Jones Made is set in a world that has developed after a nuclear war. In this world, the Cold War between the USA and China has escalated. After the end of hostilities, the rest of humanity, still suffering from the effects of radioactive fallout, is in the process of rebuilding. At the centre of this change is the general adoption of ‘relativism’ as the central legal and moral doctrine, enforced by a brutal police state.

Relativism prohibits any person from considering as true that which is uncertain. This includes expressions of opinion, personal beliefs and religious or other unproven views. The reasoning behind this is that all differences of opinion, and therefore all wars, are based on differences between people. Floyd Jones is the main character of the story alongside Doug Cussick. As a result of radiation exposure from the nuclear war, Jones was born a mutant. He has the unique ability to see his life a year in advance: The present experienced by others is a fading memory for him. Jones is convinced that the Earth is too small and limited to accommodate humanity in the long term. He sees the colonisation of other planets as inevitable and believes that the existing social order is incapable of facilitating this transition. Jones aims for a long-term expansion of humanity to the stars. Jones predicts the arrival on Earth of an extraterrestrial species known as ‘drifters’. He mobilises his followers to fend off the supposed invasion.

In the long term, he endeavours to track the Drifters to their home planet and usher in a new era of aggressive human expansion. However, Jones realises too late that the Drifters are harmless and that his large-scale crusade will not extend beyond a few local star systems. The fully developed adults, whose embryos are the drifters, will seal off humanity within their local space area indefinitely, as they perceive the human species as an annoying virus. This interrupts Jones' fantasy of travelling to the stars practically the moment it begins. Jones realizes at the end that he has made a mistake. He condemns himself for attempting to colonize space but achieving the opposite. He recognizes that any strategy aimed at transforming humanity into an open society must involve a certain degree of uncertainty to succeed. His final act is to remove himself as the decisive force in the situation. He deliberately allows himself to be killed.

On the other side stands Doug Cussick, a loyal but internally conflicted representative of the system. On one hand, he believes in the necessity of the order maintained by relativism; on the other hand, he becomes increasingly disillusioned by the inertia and moral compromises that come with it. Unlike Floyd Jones, Doug Cussick is a grounded and morally ambiguous figure. He represents the average person working within a flawed system, not believing in it but also seeing no alternative.

While Jones continues to rise, Cussick's personal life falls apart before his eyes. His marriage to Nina breaks down, the masks come off, and he realizes how the lies of society have been exposed by Jones. The mutants in the nightclub, who possess both male and female characteristics, are the ultimate expression of relativism and bring Cussick’s ongoing struggle with himself and his views on reality to a climax. In contrast to Jones, Cussick continuously questions and revises his interpretation of the world, making concrete and impactful decisions about his future. And while Jones and humanity experience a catastrophic downfall, the fate of Cussick and the inhabitants on Venus has a distinctly redemptive and restorative aspect.
