= The Game-Players of Titan =

1963 novel by Philip K. Dick

- Cover of first edition (paperback)
- Author: Philip K. Dick
- Cover artist: Jack Gaughan
- Language: English
- Genre: Science fiction
- Publisher: Ace Books
- Publication date: 1963
- Publication place: United States
- Media type: Print (hardback & paperback)
- Pages: 191

The Game-Players of Titan is a 1963 science fiction novel by American writer Philip K. Dick.

It was most likely written in May 1963, the Agency received the manuscript on June 4, 1963, and the first edition was a full-size paperback published by Ace Books in January 1964, before the paperback edition of The Man in the High Castle (first published October 1962), was published in January 1964. Dick wrote Scott Meredith in 1965 that The Unteleported Man had related elements.

== Plot summary ==
Pete Garden, the protagonist, is one of several residents who own large swathes of property in a depopulated, post-apocalyptic future world. These residents are organized in groups of regular competitors who play a board game called "Bluff". These contestants (or "Bindmen") stake their property, marriages, and future status as eligible game players on its outcomes. Pete also experiences bipolar disorder, which may adversely affect his competence as a Game participant.

The Game is administered by amorphous, silicon-based aliens from Titan, Saturn's largest satellite. These creatures, known as the vugs, are obsessed with gambling. In addition, the Game's exogamy/outcrossing helps to promote human fertility after the devastation of global warfare, after satellite-borne "Henkel Radiation" weaponry from Red China sterilized much of the Earth's population. The vugs exert hegemony over Earth but do not occupy it as such. Instead, it is visualized as a paternalistic relationship. Moreover, while the vugs are telepaths, they do not allow the use of human telepathy or precognition within the context of the Game. The vugs are also involved within human society, using induced hallucination to maintain the semblance of human form. They also perpetuate the charade through the use of physical human shells or simulacra.

At the beginning, Pete has lost his favorite property, Berkeley, and his wife, Freya. Moreover, Berkeley's new owner has sold it to a notoriously corrupt Bindman from the East Coast, Jerome Luckman. Pete misses Freya, and worries about the compatibility of his new wife. He is also attracted to Pat McClain, a mysteriously fertile woman living within his remaining property, as well as Mary Anne, her eighteen-year-old daughter. Pat is a telepath, while her husband Allen is precognitive, and their daughter manifests telekinesis. These telepaths resent the fact that they are not allowed to participate in the Game, due to possible abuse of their abilities during the contest. Pete breaks off his tentative relationship with Pat when he discovers that his new wife, Carol, is pregnant - a rare occurrence in this largely infertile, depopulated world.

Luckman, the new owner of Berkeley, is murdered, and Pete is implicated, along with six other members of his group, Pretty Blue Fox. Pete and the other group members are suffering from induced amnesia, and this only makes them look even more suspicious in the eyes of both vug and human law enforcement officials. Pete discovers that vugs are abusing their own psionic abilities to appear human. However, the vugs also have their own political factions, which further complicates matters. "Extremists" favor subversion and conquest of Earth, while "moderates" favor the status quo of paternalistic collaboration. Fertile humans begin an underground resistance against the vugs, but in the ultimate ironic twist, they are replaced by vugs posing as humans. Pretty Blue Fox syndicate members are teleported to Titan where they play a decisive end-Game with Titanian vug counterparts for the geopolitical future of the United States.

== Reception ==
A parodic meta-narrative, The Game-Players of Titan is also the story of a science-fiction writer who manipulates science-fiction's most predictable formulas, who uses his characters as puppets, who thinks he is allowed to call in doubt his own ending with the tricks and sleights of hand of a juggler, a game player

— Carlo Pagetti (2014 translation by Rossi)

[Dick], like the Queen of Hearts, is changing the rules halfway through the game.

— Katherine Hayles (2000)

[An open world game is] like Philip K. Dick's novel, The Game Players of Titan. It seems like we are playing some vast and incredible game, but really we are the tokens, not the players. It's the Vugs that play, and they play on Titan, on another world, in a meta-game...by their own rules.

— McKenzie Wark (2015)
