= Star Quest =

1968 novel by Dean Koontz

- Author: Dean Koontz
- Cover artist: Gray Morrow
- Language: English
- Genre: Science fiction
- Publisher: Ace Books
- Publication date: 1968
- Publication place: United States
- Pages: 127

Star Quest was Dean R. Koontz's first novel. Originally published in 1968, by Ace Books, Inc. This book was 127 pages and was published as an Ace Double (two novels in one volume) paperback together with Doom of the Green Planet by Emil Petaja and was priced at $0.60. Koontz was 23 years old at the time of publication.

== Plot ==
"In a universe that had been ravaged by a thousand years of interplanetary warfare between the star-shattering Romaghins and the equally voracious Setessins, there seemed now but one thing that might bring the destruction to an end. That would be the right catalyst in the hands of the right people. The right catalyst could well be the individualist rebel, Tohm... he who had once been a simple peasant and who had been forcibly changed into a fearfully armored instrument of mechanical warfare—the man-tank Jumbo Ten. But the right people? Could they possibly be the hated driftwood of biological warfare—those monsters of a cosmic no-man's land—the Muties?"
