= John M. Faucette =

American novelist

- Born: 1943
- Died: January 2003 (aged 59–60)

John M. Faucette (September 15, 1943–2003) was an African-American science-fiction author. He published five novels (four of them in the 1960s) and one short story. At the time of his death he had seven unpublished novels in various states of completion. Two of his novels; Crown of Infinity and Age of Ruin, were published in the popular Ace Doubles series.

Faucette was born and raised in Harlem and lived there for twenty-six years. He graduated from Bronx High School of Science and majored in chemistry at the Polytechnic Institute of Brooklyn before studying filmmaking, screenplay, and short-story writing at New York University's School of Continuing Education.

Faucette died of a heart attack in 2003.

All I have ever wanted was to be a writer. Unfortunately, the editors have decreed otherwise. But 'if it doesn't kill you....' The years of rejection have forced me to walk in paths and directions I probably would not have if I'd been successful, to probe the limits of my ability and find a way past them and to look at things with an ever more critical and creative eye. The best is yet to come.

== Bibliography ==
=== Published ===
- Crown of Infinity (1968)
- Siege of Earth (1971)
- The Warriors of Terra (Belmont Books, 1970)
- The Age of Ruin (1968)
- Disco Hustle (Holloway House, 1978)
- The Secret - AIM Magazine (1999)
- Messenger of God - AIM Magazine (2001)
- Pets - Artemis Magazine (2001)
- Black Science Fiction (2002) Publisher: Macro Publishing Group (May 15, 2002) ISBN 0-7414-1004-4, 437 pages.

=== Unpublished ===
- Earth Will be Avenged
- The Gypsy Dick
- The Tan Argus III Interstellar Chess Tournament
- Sex Death
- Tell My People
- Homo Cosmos
- The Ghettoes of Hell
