= Karl Drobnic =

Karl Drobnic (born 1943) is an American educator and publisher, He pioneered work in English for Specific Purposes during the era of large scale technology transfer programs between developed and underdeveloped nations in the latter half of the twentieth century.

Drobnic co-edited English for Specific Purposes: Science and Technology in 1978 with Louis and Mary Trimble and co-wrote Sci Tech (publisher: Prentice Hall, 1980). He published the English for Specific Purposes newsletter from 1978 to 1980, a monthly newsletter that advanced the turn of English as a Second Language teaching methodology from prescriptive to descriptive.

Drobnic's place in the early history (pre-1980)of English for Specific Purposes is described in "ESP serial publications before The ESP Journal/English for Specific Purposes: Recollections and reflections of an old-timer". This article appears in English for Specific Purposes, Volume 60, October 2020, Pages 4–8. "Pride of place here belongs to The ESP Newsletter and EST Clearinghouse from Oregon State University and under the Editorship and Management of Karl Drobnic. In effect, during those years the field was rapidly coming of age."
