= The Unteleported Man =

1966 novel by Philip K. Dick

- Cover of first edition (paperback)
- Author: Philip K. Dick
- Language: English
- Genre: Science fiction
- Publisher: Ace Books
- Publication date: 1966
- Publication place: United States
- Media type: Print (Paperback)
- Pages: 100

The Unteleported Man (later republished in a greatly expanded version as Lies, Inc.) is a 1966 science fiction novel by American writer Philip K. Dick, first published as a novella in 1964. It is about a future in which a one-way teleportation technology enables 40 million people to emigrate to a colony named Whale's Mouth on an Earth-like planet, which advertisements show as a lush green utopia. When the owner of a failing spaceship travel firm tries to take the 18-year flight to the colony to bring back any unhappy colonists, powerful forces try to stop him from finding out the truth.

== Plot summary ==
A new teleportation technology ("telpor") makes travel by spaceship obsolete. A new colony in the Fomalhaut star system, Whale's Mouth, has been the destination for forty million emigrants, but it is a one-way trip - teleportation back to Earth is supposedly impossible. The only way to return is by spaceship, an eighteen-year journey for passengers who are subjected to a limited form of suspended animation.

Rachmael ben Applebaum, whose spaceship business has been ruined by teleportation, decides to make the journey to Whale's Mouth in his own craft, the Omphalos. Driven by a powerful hunch that the utopian claims may be false, he chooses to make the trip the old-fashioned way in case some of the colonists wish to return. Powerful figures oppose his journey.

Lies, Inc., the expanded version of The Unteleported Man, includes a new first chapter and about one hundred pages of additional exposition. This previously unpublished material begins in Chapter 8 with the phrase, "Acrid smoke billowed about him, stinging his nostrils." What then ensues is a truly horrific drug trip, described in excruciating detail, that Rachmael endures after arriving at his destination and being hit by an LSD-tipped dart. The expansion material finally terminates in Chapter 15 just before the repeated phrase, "Acrid smoke billowed about him, stinging his nostrils."

Confusion may arise in the reader, however, over Dick's attributing at least part of the perceptual chaos to a deliberately incorporated effect of the teleportation process. Circumstances had forced Rachmael to abandon his original plans and to journey to Newcolonizedland via energy transfer instead. Sinister modifications to the "Telpor" technology apparently cause its victims to experience a variety of so-called "paraworlds" which are thought to actually exist, somehow, as viable alternate realities. Participants are fearful that consensus or agreement amongst themselves as to the paraworlds' descriptions could somehow cause one or the other paraworld to manifest itself ever more aggressively until eventually displacing the current reality-paradigm altogether. And Rachmael's own paraworld experience is said to be the worst one of all.

== Characters ==
- Rachmael ben Applebaum: The story's protagonist. Former owner of Applebaum Enterprise, a spaceship firm. Ben Applebaum is implied to be of Jewish-Israeli descent, which is a particular source of distaste for the Third Reich-esque German authority figures who he opposes.
- Theodoric Ferry: Leader of Trails of Hoffman, Ltd., which runs the teleportation machines.
- Matson Glazer-Holliday: Head of the police organization Lies, Incorporated.
- Freya Holm: Matson Glazer-Holliday's mistress, and an employee of Lies, Incorporated.
- Sepp von Einem: Creator of the telpor device, and employee of Trails of Hoffman, Ltd.
- Gregory Gloch: von Einem's young apprentice and a skilled weapons designer. Gloch is "proleptic", and has become displaced in time.
- Al Dosker: Lies, Incorporated's "ace pilot". Dosker is physically described as a "small and shrewd-looking" African-American.

== Publishing history ==
This particular book has an unusual publishing history compared to other novels by Dick. The story originally appeared in Fantastic Magazine in 1964. The story rights were then bought by Ace Books but Dick's subsequent revisions to bring the manuscript up to novel-length were rejected and the original story was published in 1966. Its first novel publication was as one half of an Ace Double bound dos-à-dos with The Mind Monsters by Howard L. Cory.

In 1983, the expanded 80,000-word story was published by Berkley Books. Dick had been revising the material to include his original 1965 expansions (some pages of the 1965 manuscript were missing, leading to continuity problems), before he died in March 1982, leaving the revision incomplete. The original story was published, with Dick's revisions, in 1984 as Lies, Inc. The missing pages were found and published in 1985 in the Philip K. Dick Society Newsletter #8. In 2004 a new edition of Lies, Inc was published which included the found pages.

== Reception ==
Dave Langford reviewed Lies Inc. for White Dwarf #56, and stated that "I'm not sure Lies, Inc's maze of nightmares does in fact make sense in objective plot terms: it's a marvellously hallucinatory experience, though, far better than the original Unteleported Man." SF Site opines that "Lies, Inc. is not an example of Philip K. Dick's best work" however it is nonetheless "an essential treat for Philip K. Dick fans".

== Sources ==
- Butler, Andrew M., “LSD, Lying Ink and Lies, Inc.” Science-Fiction Studies, #96 32:2, July, pp. 265–80, 2005.
