= Dr. Futurity =

1960 novel by Philip K. Dick

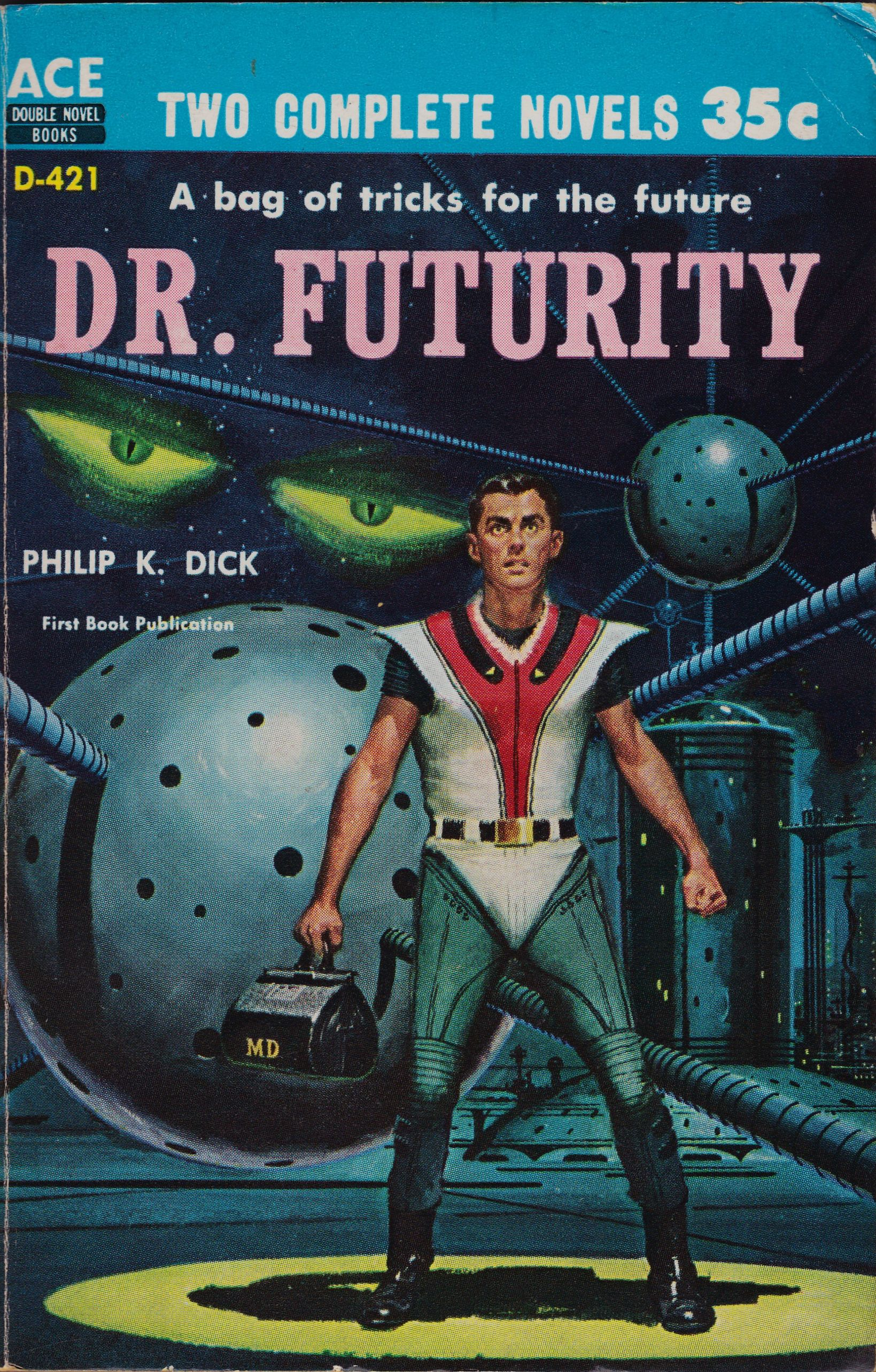
- Cover of first edition (paperback)
- Author: Philip K. Dick
- Language: English
- Genre: Science fiction
- Publisher: Ace Books
- Publication date: 1960
- Publication place: United States
- Media type: Print (hardback & paperback)
- Pages: 138

Dr. Futurity is a 1960 science fiction novel by American writer Philip K. Dick. It is an expansion of his earlier short story "Time Pawn", which first saw publication in the summer 1954 issue of Thrilling Wonder Stories. Dr. Futurity was first published as a novel by Ace Books as one half of Ace Double D-421, bound dos-à-dos with John Brunner's Slavers of Space.

== Plot ==
Dr. Jim Parsons is a physician born in 1980 and living in 2012. Abruptly, he undergoes involuntary time travel to 2405 and finds that his profession is treated with disdain. In the future, the population is static, with no natural births; only a death can cause the formation of a new embryo. The result is a society ambivalent toward death, as controlled genetics ensures that each successive generation better benefits the human race as a whole. By killing off the weak and the malformed, poverty and disease are eliminated, and humanity has an optimal chance for survival. Moreover, a single race derived from a mix of races controls this future world, as white men had become extinct centuries earlier.

After Parsons cures a dying woman (not knowing that this is considered a heinous crime in this time period), Chancellor Al Stenog exiles him to Mars, but the spaceship is intercepted en route, and Parsons is returned to a deserted Earth far in the future. On finding a marker with instructions on how to operate the time travel controls on the spaceship, he is directed to a Native American-style tribal lodge, where he must perform surgery to hopefully restore the life of a cryogenically suspended time traveler, Corith, subsequent to the latter's death from an arrow wound 35 years earlier. Parsons extracts the missile but it later mysteriously rematerializes in Corith's body.

To resolve this situation, Parsons travels with Corith's relatives back to Corith's previous assignment in 1579 on the Pacific Coast of North America, where Corith was to kill Sir Francis Drake in order to change history and preserve the Native American way of life, avoiding their subjugation by European colonial powers. While observing the assassination attempt on Drake, Parsons realizes that Drake is actually Chancellor Stenog. It seems that Stenog, in an ironic twist of fate, has taken Drake's place long enough to ensure that Corith's mission fails. Parsons tries to warn Corith, but Corith discovers that Parsons is a disguised white man and attacks him. In the ensuing struggle, Parsons inadvertently stabs Corith in the heart with one of the arrow replicas that were intended to make it appear that Drake was killed by a Native American of that period.

In retribution, Parsons is left stranded by Corith's relatives in 1597, a year in which the European explorers had removed themselves for many years to come. But Parsons is quickly rescued by Loris, Corith's daughter, when she has a change of heart after learning that she is pregnant with Parsons' child.

While briefly back in 2405, Parsons realizes that the reason the arrow mysteriously reappeared in Corith's chest after he'd removed it was because he had apparently murdered him for a second time to cover his own tracks. If Corith were to recover, he would have revealed that it was Parsons who killed him, and an unwitting Parsons from slightly earlier would have been left helpless at the hands of Corith's relatives. As he stands over Corith, ready to kill him for a second time, he decides against it and flees. But a nagging curiosity obliges him to return yet again. He sees two unknown people kill Corith with the second arrow to the heart. Parsons discovers that the murderers are the children he will one day have with Loris, traveling back to 2405 from an even more distant future.

His children take Parsons forward in time to meet with Loris again, and he struggles with the decision to return to 2012. Eventually he goes back to the same day that he left and to the doting wife who saw him off earlier that morning. He sets about his old life with a new task at hand. The novel closes with him designing the stone marker that will eventually save his life on that desolate future Earth.

== Sources ==
- Andrew Butler: The Pocket Essential Philip K. Dick: Harpenden: Pocket Essentials: 2007: ISBN 978-1-904048-92-3
- Tuck, Donald H. (1974). The Encyclopedia of Science Fiction and Fantasy. Chicago: Advent. p. 142. ISBN 0-911682-20-1.
