= The Man Who Japed =

1956 novel by Philip K. Dick

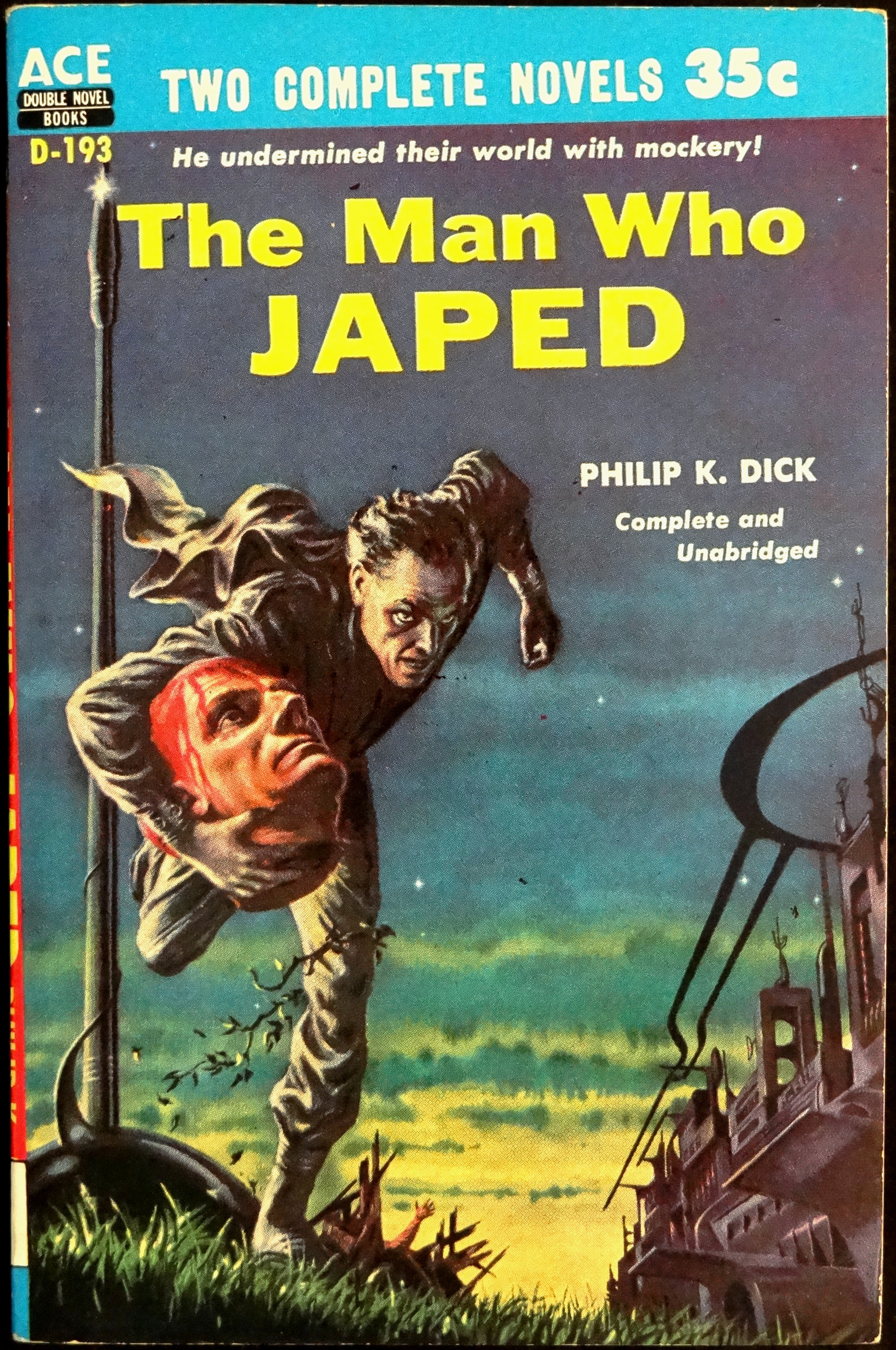
- Cover of first edition (paperback)
- Author: Philip K. Dick
- Cover artist: Ed Emshwiller
- Language: English
- Genre: Science fiction
- Publisher: Ace Books
- Publication date: 1956
- Publication place: United States
- Media type: Print (hardback & paperback)
- Pages: 160 pp

The Man Who Japed is a science fiction novel by American writer Philip K. Dick, first published in 1956. Although one of Dick's lesser-known novels, it features several of the ideas and themes that recur throughout his later works. The "jape[s]" or practical jokes of the novel begin with a statue's unconventional decapitation.

The Man Who Japed was first published by Ace Books as one half of Ace Double D-193, bound dos-à-dos with The Space Born by E. C. Tubb.

== Plot introduction ==
The Man Who Japed is set in the year 2114. After a devastating twentieth century limited nuclear war, a South African ("Afrikaans Empire") military survivor named General Streiter launched a global revolution in 1985 that ushered in a totalitarian government. In one example of the carnage Dick has his protagonist Allen Purcell visit Japan's northern island, Hokkaidō. The location is still a desolate wasteland that has not recovered from nuclear bombardment in 1972, the last year of the global war referred to within this book.

This regime - Moral Reclamation ("Morec") - rules a post-apocalyptic world under its strict ideology. One of Streiter's lineal descendants, Ida Pease Hoyt, is in charge. Morec has created an ultra-conservative and puritanical society that is oppressive and judgmental of its fellow citizens. Punishable offenses include mild public cursing, kissing a non-spouse, absenteeism from community meetings and the commercial display of neon signs. A thriving black market exists, however, where one can purchase the Decameron, James Joyce's Ulysses, chablis wine and pulp fiction detective novels from the twentieth century.

Earth people also occupy several other planetary systems. There are human colonies on Bellatrix (Gamma Orionis), Sirius 8 and 9, and "Orionus." On these worlds, intensive labour is required to provide agricultural and industrial products for survival. One of the planets is used as a "Refuge" for the rehabilitation of social misfits or "nooses".

The "japery" alluded to in the title is Allen Purcell's wanton destruction of a statue of General Streiter. But Purcell has only vague, distorted and disjointed memories of the act and doesn't understand his own motivation for doing it. He is up for an appointment to a high-level position as a guardian of public ethics.

Purcell later intentionally concocts a history of General Streiter for a live televised broadcast that falsely claims Streiter had a policy of having his enemies butchered and served as meals to his family and himself. Hoyt is accused of continuing the practice of cannibalism.

Purcell and his wife are about to escape Morec justice when he has a change of heart and decides to remain on Earth and face the consequences of his crime. He promises his wife a trip to friend Myron Mavis's planet when they both make it through to "the other side" of their punishment.

== Reception ==
Anthony Boucher dismissed the novel as a "hasty and disappointing" effort.
