= Louis Trimble =

American novelist

Louis Preston Trimble (2 March 1917 – 9 March 1988) was an American writer and academic. His published work included science fiction, westerns, mysteries, and academic non-fiction. He generally wrote as Louis Trimble, but used the pseudonym "Stuart Brock" for some of his work.

Born in Seattle, Washington, he published his first story in 1938, but did not move into the science-fiction genre until the mid-1950s. He attended a number of universities in Washington state and Pennsylvania. After working as a logger and a housepainter, he became an instructor and professor in humanities and social studies at the University of Washington from 1956 onward.

Trimble's work in applied linguistics examined the use of English in science and technology contexts. As a member of the Washington School he advanced the "grammatical-rhetorical" position in English for Science and Technology research, which argued that linguistic analysis of scientific discourse should consider how various rhetorical functions manifested grammatically in texts at the discourse level.

== Selected Works ==
- Anthropol (1968)
- The Noblest Experiment in the Galaxy (1970)
- The City Machine (1972)
- The Guardians of the Gate (1972) (with Jacquelyn Trimble)
- The Wandering Variables (1972)
- The Bodelan Way (1974)
- Bring Back Her Body (1953)
- Stab in the Dark (1956)
- Nothing to Lose But My Life (1957)
- The Smell of Trouble (1958)
- The Corpse Without A Country (1957)
- Till Death Do Us Part (1959)
- Mountain Ambush (1959)
- Obit Deferred (1959)
- Cargo For The Styx (1959)
- The Duchess of Skid Row (1961)
- Love Me and Die (1961)
- The Surfside Caper (1961)
- Whispering Canyon (1961) (as Stuart Brock)
- Siege At High Meadow (1962)
- The Desperate Deputy of Cougar Hill (1965)
- English for Specific Purposes: Science and Technology (1981) (with Karl Drobnic)
