= Giles A. Lutz =

American novelist

Giles Alfred Lutz (March 1910 – June 1982) was a prolific author of fiction in the Western genre. Born in March 1910 in Missouri, United States, Lutz for many years wrote short stories about the American West that were published in pulp magazines. His story Get a Wild Horse Hunter, an example of his pulp fiction writing, appeared in the June 1952 edition of the magazine Western Novels and Short Stories. In the mid-1950s Lutz made the transition to full-length novels, and until his death in June 1982, published numerous stories about the American West. In 1962, Lutz won the Western Writers of America Golden Spur Award for his novel The Honyocker.

Lutz wrote under several pseudonyms during his pulp fiction career, including under the names: James B. Chaffin, Wade Everett (with Will Cook), Alex Hawk, Hunter, Hunter Ingram, Reese Sullivan, and Gene Thompson. Under the pseudonym Brad Curtis, Lutz wrote steamy pulp novels in the erotica genre. He also wrote a lot of sports fiction for the pulp magazines, in titles like Ace Sports, Complete Sports, and Football Stories.

== Bibliography ==
Genres: EN for erotic novels.

=== Novels ===
genre	credits	title	publisher	year	comments
WE	Giles A. Lutz	Fight Or Run		1954
WE	Giles A. Lutz	The Golden Bawd		1956
WE	Giles A. Lutz	To Hell and Texas		1956
WE	Giles A. Lutz	Fury Trail		1957
WE	Giles A. Lutz	Gun the Man Down		1957
WE	Giles A. Lutz	Relentless Gun		1958
WE	Giles A. Lutz	Outcast Gun		1958
WE	Giles A. Lutz	The Homing Bullet		1959
WE	Giles A. Lutz	Law of the Trigger	Ace Books	1959
WE	Giles A. Lutz	The Challenger	Ace Books	1960
WE	Giles A. Lutz	Stranger in My Bed		1960
WE	Giles A. Lutz	The Wild Quarry	Ace Books	1961
WE	Giles A. Lutz	The Long Cold Wind		1962
WE	Giles A. Lutz	The Golden Land		1963
WE	Giles A. Lutz	Halfway to Hell		1963
WE	Giles A. Lutz	Killer's Trail		1963
WE	Giles A. Lutz	Range Feud		1963
WE	Giles A. Lutz	The Blind Trail		1964
WE	Giles A. Lutz	The Bleeding Land		1965
WE	Giles A. Lutz	Nemesis of Circle A		1965
WE	Giles A. Lutz	Deadly Like a .45		1966
WE	Giles A. Lutz	The Demanding Land		1966
WE	Giles A. Lutz	The Hardy Breed		1966
WE	Giles A. Lutz	The Magnificent Failure		1967
WE	Giles A. Lutz	The Trouble Borrower		1968
WE	Giles A. Lutz	The Vengeance Ghost		1968
WE	Giles A. Lutz	Wild Runs the River		1968
WE	Giles A. Lutz	The Deadly Deputy		1969
WE	Giles A. Lutz	The Honyocker		1969
WE	Giles A. Lutz	Montana Crossing		1970
WE	Giles A. Lutz	Man On the Run		1971
WE	Giles A. Lutz	The Stranger		1972
WE	Giles A. Lutz	The Unbeaten		1972
WE	Giles A. Lutz	Gun Rich		1973
WE	Giles A. Lutz	The Outsider		1973
WE	Giles A. Lutz	Lonely Ride		1973
WE	Giles A. Lutz	Blood Feud		1973
WE	Giles A. Lutz	The Grudge		1974
WE	Giles A. Lutz	The Offenders		1974
WE	Giles A. Lutz	Reprisal!		1974
WE	Giles A. Lutz	The Black Day		1974
WE	Giles A. Lutz	Stagecoach to Hell		1975
WE	Giles A. Lutz	My Brothers Keeper		1975
WE	Giles A. Lutz	The Stubborn Breed		1975
WE	Giles A. Lutz	A Drifting Man		1976
WE	Giles A. Lutz	Night of the Cattlemen		1976
WE	Giles A. Lutz	The Way Homeward		1977
WE	Giles A. Lutz	A Time for Vengeance		1977
WE	Giles A. Lutz	Turn Around		1978
WE	Giles A. Lutz	The Ragged Edge		1978
WE	Giles A. Lutz	The Shoot Out		1978
WE	Giles A. Lutz	Lure of the Outlaw Trail		1979
WE	Giles A. Lutz	Lure of the Trail		1980
WE	Giles A. Lutz	The Trespassers		1980
WE	Giles A. Lutz	Fort Apache		1980
WE	Giles A. Lutz	Thieves' Brand		1981
WE	Giles A. Lutz	The Echo		1981
WE	Giles A. Lutz	Forked Tongue		1981
WE	Giles A. Lutz	Man Hunt		1981
WE	Giles A. Lutz	Great Railroad War		1982
WE	Giles A. Lutz	Smash the Wild Bunch		1982
WE	Giles A. Lutz	War on the Range		1982
WE	Giles A. Lutz	The Feud		1982
WE	Giles A. Lutz	The Tangled Web		1983
WE	Giles A. Lutz	Vengeance Ghost / Gun Rich		1980	omnibus
WE	Giles A. Lutz	Gun Rich / Battling Buckeroos		1962	anthology with Tom West
EN	Brad Curtis	Man Trap		1963
EN	Brad Curtis	For Services Rendered		1964
EN	Brad Curtis	Man-Tamer		1964
EN	Brad Curtis	Private Property		1964
EN	Brad Curtis	The Golden Greed		1965
EN	Brad Curtis	The Love Goddess		1965
EN	Brad Curtis	Night Shift		1965
EN	Brad Curtis	A Female Female		1966
EN	Brad Curtis	Jody		1966
EN	Brad Curtis	Live and Let Live		1966
EN	Brad Curtis	Pleasure Play		1967
