= Gordon D. Shirreffs =

American novelist

Gordon Donald Shirreffs (January 15, 1914 – February 9, 1996) was an American author, known mostly for writing Western and juvenile (young adult) novels. He also wrote a teleplay. Two of his novels, Judas Gun (1964) and Rio Bravo (1956), were made into the films A Long Ride from Hell (1968) and Oregon Passage (1957) respectively. One of his short stories, "Silent Reckoning" (1954), became the film The Lonesome Trail (1955).

== Biography ==
Gordon Shirreffs was born in Chicago, Illinois in 1914, soon after his mother emigrated from Scotland. When his National Guard unit was activated in 1940 Shirreffs served in World War II where he was stationed in Alaska's Aleutian Islands as part of the Pacific Theater. Following the war he attended Northwestern University where he earned a Bachelor of Arts degree.

Shirreffs married Alice Johanna Gutwein on February 7, 1941, in El Paso, TX. They had two children, a daughter Carole (born 1943) and a son Brian (1946–2015), who died June 22, 2015, Long Beach, CA.

He lived in Granada Hills, San Fernando Valley, CA from 1952 until his death in 1996.

For a time in the 1950s, Shirreffs operated a hobby shop in Granada Hills. In keeping with his Scottish roots, he was a member of one or more bagpipe bands in Burbank and San Fernando, CA.

== Bibliography ==
=== Novels ===
- Arizona Justice (1956) (as Gordon Donalds)
- Range Rebel (1956)
- Rio Bravo (1956)
- Gunswift (1956) (as Stewart Gordon)
- Code of the Gun (1956)
- Top Gun (1957) (as Gordon Donalds)
- Bugles on the Prairie (1957)
- Fort Vengeance (1957)
- Ambush on the Mesa (1957)
- Son of the Thunder People (1957) (For Children)
- Massacre Creek (1958)
- Shadow Valley (1958)
- Last Train from Gunhill (Novelization of screenplay, 1959)
- The Brave Rifles (1959)
- Trail's End (1959)
- Roanoke Raiders (1959) (For Children)
- The Lonely Gun (1959)
- Renegade Lawman (1959)
- Fort Suicide (1959)
- Shadow of a Gunman (1959)
- The Rebel Trumpet (1959) (For Children)
- Apache Butte (1960)
- They Met Danger (1960)
- The Mosquito Fleet (1961) (For Children)
- The Proud Gun (1961)
- Ride a Lone Trail (1961)
- The Gray Sea Raiders (1961) (For Children)
- Powder Boy of the Monitor (1961)
- The Valiant Bugles (1962)
- The Border Guidon (1962)
- Hangin' Pards (1962)
- Tumbleweed Trigger (1962)
- Action Front! (1962) (For Children)
- Voice of the Gun (1962)
- Rio Desperado (1962)
- The Haunted Treasure of the Espectros (1962) (For Children)
- The Cold Seas Beyond (1963) (For Children)
- Slaughter at Broken Bow (1963)
- Quicktrigger (1963)
- The Nevada Gun (1963)
- Gunslingers Three (1963)
- Mystery of Lost Canyon (1963) (For Children)
- Judas Gun (1964)
- The Hostile Beaches (1964) (For Children)
- Last Man Alive (1964)
- Too Tough to Die (1964)
- The Hidden Rider of Dark Mountain (1964)
- Blood Justice (1964)
- The Secret of the Spanish Desert (1964) (For Children)
- Now He is Legend (1965)
- The Lone Rifle (1965)
- The Enemy Seas (1965) (For Children)
- Barranca (1966)
- The Bolo Battalion (1966) (For Children)
- Southwest Drifter (1967)
- Torpedoes Away! (1967) (For Children)
- The Godless Breed (1968)
- Five Graves to Boothill (1968)
- The Mystery of the Lost Cliff Dwelling (1968) (For Children)
- The Killer Sea (1968) (For Children)
- Showdown in Sonora (1969)
- Jack of Spades (1970)
- Mystery of the Haunted Mine (1970)
- The Manhunter (1970)
- Brasada (1972)
- Bowman's Kid (1973)
- Renegade's Trail (1974)
- Shootout (1974) (as Jackson Flynn)
- Duel at Dodge City (1974) (Novelization of Television Script, as Jackson Flynn)
- Cheyenne Vengeance (1975) (Novelization of Television Script, as Jackson Flynn)
- The Apache Hunter (1976)
- The Marauders (1976)
- Rio Diablo (1977)
- Legend of the Damned (1977)
- Captain Cutlass (1978)
- Calgaich the Swordsman (1980)
- The Untamed Breed (1981)
- Bold Legend (1982)
- Glorieta Pass (1984)
- The Ghost Dancers (1986)
- Hell's Forty Acres (1987)
- Maximilian's Gold (1988)
- The Walking Sands (1990)
- The Devil's Dance Floor (1994)

=== Omnibus ===
- Three from the West (1963)
- Blood Justice / Valiant Bugles (1985)
- Last Train from Gun Hill / Border Guidon (1992)
- Rio Diablo / Top Gun (1993)
- Shadow Valley / Fort Vengeance (1993)
- Showdown in Sonora / Manhunter (1995)
- Bowman's Kid / Renegade's Trail (1995)
- Apache Hunter / Marauders (1995)
