= List of Ace titles in first DGS series =

Ace Books' first series of paperbacks, the D/G/S series, began in 1952 and ran until 1965, by which time other series from Ace had begun. The D/G/S series used a serial number from 1–599, and a letter code to indicate price. D-series books cost 35 cents; S-series titles were 25 cents; and later there were several G-series books, priced at 50 cents.

Note that there is a separate G-Series, which began in 1964 with independent numbering from this series.

== 001–099 ==
- D-001 MY Samuel W. Taylor The Grinning Gismo / Keith Vining Too Hot For Hell (1952)
- D-002 WE William Colt MacDonald Bad Man's Return / J. Edward Leithead Bloody Hoofs (1952)
- D-003 MY Mel Colton The Big Fix / Kate Clugston Twist the Knife Slowly (A Murderer in the House) (1952)
- D-004 WE Lewis B. Patten Massacre at White River / Walter A. Tompkins Rimrock Rider (1952)
- D-005 MY Eaton R. Goldthwaite The Scarlet Spade / Harry Whittington Drawn To Evil (1952)
- D-006 WE William E. Vance The Branded Lawman / Nelson C. Nye Plunder Valley (1952)
- D-007 MY Stephen Ransome I, the Executioner (False Bounty) / Harry Whittington So Dead My Love! (1953)
- D-008 WE Allan K. Echols Terror Rides the Range / Tom West Gunsmoke Gold (1953)
- D-009 MY Michael Morgan Decoy / Sherwood King If I Die Before I Wake (1953)
- D-010 WE Leslie Scott The Brazos Firebrand / Gordon Young Hell on Hoofs (1953)
- D-011 MY Day Keene Mrs. Homicide / William L. Stuart Dead Ahead
- D-012 WE Dudley Dean Mcgaughty (as Dean Owen) The Man From Boot Hill / Dan J. Stevens Wild Horse Range (1953)
- D-013 NA Theodore S. Drachman Cry Plague! / Leslie Edgley The Judas Goat (1953)
- D-014 WE Paul Evan Lehman Vultures on Horseback / George Kilrain Maverick with a Star (1953)
- D-015 MY William S. Burroughs (as William Lee) Junkie / Maurice Helbrant Narcotic Agent (1953)
- D-016 MY Edmond de Goncourt and J. De Goncourt Germinie'' / Paul Bourget Crime D'Amour (1953)
- D-017 MY William Campbell Gault (as Roney Scott) Shakedown / Howard Fast (as Walter Ericson) The Darkness Within
- D-018 WE J. Edward Leithead The Lead-Slingers / Samuel Peeples (as Brad Ward) The Hanging Hills (1953)
- D-019 MY Hal Braham (as Mel Colton) Never Kill A Cop / Leslie Edgley Fear No More (1953)
- D-020 WE Roy Manning The Desparado Code / Allan K. Echols Double-Cross Brand
- D-021 MY John N. Makris Nightshade / Lester Dent High Stakes (1953)
- D-022 WE Bliss Lomax Maverick of the Plains / Leslie Scott Badlands Masquerader (1953)
- D-023 MY Louis Trimble (as Stuart Brock) Bring Back Her Body / Richard Sale Passing Strange (1953)
- D-024 WE Tom West Vulture Valley / John Callahan The Sidewinders (1953)
- D-025 NA P.G. Wodehouse Quick Service / The Code of the Woosters (1953)
- D-026 NA Harold Acton and Lee Yi-Hsieh (translators) Love in a Junk And Other Exotic Tales / Charles Pettit The Impotent General (1953)
- D-027 MY Bruno Fischer The Fingered Man / Hal Braham (as Mel Colton) Double Take (1953)
- D-028 WE Paul Evans Gunsmoke Kingdom / William E. Vance Avenger From Nowhere (1953)
- D-029 MY Ross Laurence The Fast Buck / J.F. Hutton Dead Man Friday
- D-030 WE George Kilrain South To Santa Fe / Samuel Peeples (as Brad Ward) Johnny Sundance (1953)
- D-031 SF A. E. van Vogt The World of Null-A / The Universe Maker (1953)
- D-032 NA Dorothy Malone Cookbook For Beginners (1953)
- D-033 MY Carl G. Hodges Murder by the Pack / Frank Kane About Face
- D-034 WE Ken Murray Hellion's Hole / Ken Murray Feud in Piney Flats (1953)
- D-035 NA Rae Loomis The Marina Street Girls / Jack Houston Open All Night (1953)
- D-036 SF Robert E. Howard Conan the Conqueror / Leigh Brackett The Sword of Rhiannon (1953)
- D-037 MY Marvin Claire The Drowning Wire / Will Oursler Departure Delayed (1953)
- D-038 WE Bliss Lomax Outlaw River / Louis L'amour (as Jim Mayo) Showdown at Yellow Butte
- D-039 WE Frank Gruber Quantrell's Raiders / Frank Gruber Rebel Road (1953)
- D-040 MY Cornell Woolrich (as William Irish) Waltz into Darkness / Malden Grange Bishop Scylla
- D-041 MY Day Keene Death House Doll / Thomas B. Dewey Mourning After (1953)
- D-042 WE Walter A. Tompkins One Against The Bullet Horde / Charles M. Martin Law For Tombstone (1954)
- D-043 NA George S. Viereck and Paul Eldridge Salome: My First 2000 Years of Love (1953)
- D-044 SF Donald A. Wollheim (ed.) The Ultimate Invader and Other Science-Fiction / Eric Frank Russell Sentinels From Space (1954)
- D-045 MY Martin L. Weiss Dead Hitches A Ride / Leslie Edgley Tracked Down (1954)
- D-046 WE Chuck Martin Law From Back Beyond / Roy Manning Vengeance Valley (1954)
- D-047 MY Joe Barry Kiss And Kill / Richard Powell On The Hook (1954)
- D-048 WE Louis L'Amour (as Jim Mayo) Utah Blaine / Samuel Peeples (as Brad Ward) Desert Showdown (1954)
- D-049 MY Dan Cushman Tongking! / Charles Grayson Golden Temptress
- D-050 NA Wilene Shaw The Mating Call / Ozro Grant The Bad 'Un (1954)
- D-051 MY Emmett Mcdowell Switcheroo / Lawrence Treat Over The Edge (1954)
- D-052 WE William Colt Macdonald Boomtown Buccaneers / Louis L'Amour Crossfire Trail (1954)
- D-053 SF Murray Leinster Gateway to Elsewhere / A. E. van Vogt The Weapon Shops of Isher (1954)
- S-054 NA Carl Offord The Naked Fear (1954)
- D-055 MY Robert Turner The Tobacco Auction Murders / Michael Stark Kill-Box
- D-056 WE Bliss Lomax Ambush at Coffin Canyon / Dwight Bennett Newton (as Clement Hardin) Hellbent for a Hangrope (1954)
- D-057 MY A.S. Fleischman Counterspy Express / M. V. Heberden (as Charles L. Leonard) Treachery in Trieste (1954)
- S-058 NA Joachim Joesten Vice, Inc. (1954)
- D-059 MY Robert Bloch Spiderweb / David Alexander The Corpse in My Bed (1951)
- S-060 WE Samuel Peeples (as Brad Ward) The Marshal of Medicine Bend (1954)
- D-061 SF L. Sprague de Camp Cosmic Manhunt / Clifford D. Simak Ring Around The Sun (1954)
- D-062 NA Ken Murray Ken Murray's Giant Joke Book (1954)
- D-063 MY Harry Whittington You'll Die Next! / Frederick C. Davis Drag The Dark
- D-064 WE Paul Evan Lehman Bullets Don't Bluff / Chandler Whipple Under The Mesa Rim (1954)
- D-065 NA Juanita Osborne Tornado Edward Kimbrough Night Fire (1954)
- S-066 SF L. Ron Hubbard Return To Tomorrow
- S-067 NA Robert Bloch The Will To Kill (1954)
- D-068 WE Walker A. Tompkins Deadwood / William Hopson Bullet-Brand Empire (1954)
- D-069 SF Lewis Padgett (Henry Kuttner) and C. L. Moore) Beyond Earth's Gates / Andre Norton Daybreak—2250 A. D. (1954)
- S-070 NA Rae Loomis Luisita (1954)
- D-071 MY John Creasey (as Gordon Ashe) Drop Dead! / Margaret Scherf The Case of the Hated Senator (1954)
- D-072 WE Ralph R. Perry Night Rider Deputy / Norman A. Fox The Devil's Saddle (1954)
- D-073 SF Donald A. Wollheim (ed.) Adventures in the Far Future / Donald A. Wollheim (ed.) Tales of Outer Space (1954)
- S-074 NA Virginia M. Harrison (as Wilene Shaw) Heat Lightning (1954)
- S-075 NA Ralph E. Shikes (ed.) Cartoon Annual (1954)
- S-076 NA Émile Zola Shame
- D-077 MY Leigh Brackett (as George Sanders) Stranger at Home / Stephen Marlowe Catch The Brass Ring (1954)
- D-078 WE Nelson Nye The One-Shot Kid / Tom West Lobo Legacy (1954)
- D-079 SF Francis Rufus Bellamy Atta / Murray Leinster The Brain Stealers (1954)
- S-080 NA Wilene Shaw The Fear and the Guilt
- D-081 MY John A. Saxon Liability Limited / Sheldon Stark Too Many Sinners
- S-082 WE Louis L'Amour Kilkenny
- S-083 MY Arnold Drake The Steel Noose (1954)
- D-084 SF Isaac Asimov The Rebellious Stars / Roger Dee An Earth Gone Mad (1954)
- S-085 NA Ernst-Maurice Tessier (as Maurice Dekobra) The Bachelor's Widow (1954)
- D-086 WE Richard Brister The Shoot-Out at Sentinel Peak / Roy Manning Tangled Trail (1954)
- S-087 NA Noland Miller Why I Am So Beat (1955)
- D-088 NA Dexter Davis (author) 7-Day System For Gaining Self-Confidence (1955)
- D-089 MY Stephen Marlowe Turn Left For Murder / Ruth Wilson and Alexander Wilson Death Watch (1955)
- S-090 SF Robert Moore Williams The Chaos Fighters
- S-091 NA Stanley Baron End of the Line (1955)
- D-092 WE Burt Arthur The Drifter / Richard Wormser and Dan Gordon The Longhorn Trail (1955)
- S-093 NA H. T. Elmo Modern Casanova's Handbook (1955)
- D-094 SF Murray Leinster The Other Side of Here / A. E. van Vogt One Against Eternity (1955)
- S-095 NA Harry Whittington The Naked Jungle (1955)
- D-096 SF Andre Norton (as Andrew North) The Last Planet / Alan E. Nourse A Man Obsessed (1955)
- S-097 MY Norman Hershman (as Norman Herries) Death Has 2 Faces (1955)
- D-098 WE Nelson Nye Texas Tornado / Samuel A. Peeples (as Samuel Anthony Peeples) The Lobo Horseman (1955)
- D-099 SF Robert Moore Williams Conquest of the Space Sea / Leigh Brackett The Galactic Breed (1955)

== 100–199 ==
- S-100 NA Henry Lewis Nixon The Caves (1955)
- D-101 MY Jack Karney Knock 'Em Dead / Hal Braham (as Mel Colton) Point of No Escape
- S-102 NA George Albert Glay Oath of Seven (1955)
- D-103 SF Philip K. Dick Solar Lottery / Leigh Brackett The Big Jump (1955)
- S-104 NA R.V. Cassill and Eric Protter Left Bank of Desire (1955)
- S-105 NA Edward De Roo The Fires of Youth (1955)
- D-106 WE D.L. Bonar Lawman Without A Badge / Lee Floren Four Texans North (1955)
- S-107 NA C.P. Hewitt (as Peter Twist) The Gilded Hideaway (1955)
- S-108 NA Leslie Waller (as C.S. Cody) Lie Like A Lady (1955)
- D-109 MY Dale Clark Mambo To Murder / Sterling Noel I See Red (1955)
- D-110 SF Isaac Asimov The 1,000 Year Plan (1955)
- D-110 SF Isaac Asimov The 1,000 Year Plan / Poul Anderson No World of Their Own (1955)
- S-111 NA Harry Harrison Kroll The Smoldering Fire (1955)
- D-112 WE Frank Castle Border Buccaneers / Harry Sinclair Drago Trigger Gospel (1955)
- D-113 SF Dwight V. Swain The Transposed Man / J. T. McIntosh One in 300 (1955)
- S-114 NA Edward Adler Living It Up (1955)
- D-115 MY Harry Whittington One Got Away / Cleve F. Adams Shady Lady (1955)
- S-116 NA Brant House Words Fail Me (1955)
- S-117 NA Kim Darien Dark Rapture (1955)
- D-118 SF Charles L. Harness The Paradox Men / Jack Williamson Dome Around America (1955)
- S-119 NA Lawrence Easton The Driven Flesh (1955)
- D-120 WE John Mcgreevey Bounty Man / Samuel A. Peeples (as Samuel Anthony Peeples) The Call of the Gun (1955)
- D-121 SF Andre Norton The Stars Are Ours! (1955)
- D-121 SF Andre Norton The Stars are Ours! / Sam Merwin, Jr. Three Faces of Time (1955)
- S-122 NA Ledru Baker Jr. The Preying Streets (1955)
- D-123 MY Gil Brewer The Squeeze / Frank Diamond Love Me To Death (1955)
- S-124 NA Rae Loomis House of Deceit (1955)
- D-125 SF Isaac Asimov The Man Who Upset The Universe (1955)
- S-126 NA A.H. Berzen Washington Bachelor (1955)
- D-127 NA Robert Payne Alexander and the Camp Follower (1955)
- D-128 WE William Hopson High Saddle / William E. Vance Way Station West (1955)
- D-129 MY Day Keene The Dangling Carrot / Norman C. Rosenthal Silenced Witnesses (1955)
- S-130 NA Sidney Weissman Backlash (1955)
- D-131 NA Eugene Wyble The Ripening
- S-132 NA Brant House (ed.) Cartoon Annual #2 (1955)
- S-133 SF Donald A. Wollheim (Ed.) Adventures on Other Planets
- D-134 WE Gene Olsen The Outsiders / Nelson Nye Tornado on Horseback (1955)
- D-135 MY Milton K. Ozaki Maid For Murder / Rene Brabazon Raymond (as James Hadley Chase) Dead Ringer (1955)
- S-136 NA R.V. Cassill A Taste of Sin
- S-137 NA Ralph Jackson Violent Night (1955)
- D-138 WE Paul Evan Gunsmoke Over Sabado / T.V. Olsen Haven of the Hunted (1956)
- D-139 SF Nick Boddie Williams The Atom Curtain / Gordon R. Dickson Alien From Arcturus (1956)
- S-140 NA H. T. Elmo Honeymoon Humor (1956)
- S-141 NA Oliver Crawford Blood on the Branches (1956)
- S-142 NA Glenn M. Barns Masquerade in Blue (1956)
- S-143 NA Harry Whittington A Woman on the Place (1956)
- D-144 WE Jay Albert The Man From Stony Lonesome / Rod Patterson A Killer Comes Riding (1956)
- S-145 NA Brant House (ed.) Little Monsters (1956)
- D-146 SF Lee Correy Contraband Rocket / Murray Leinster The Forgotten Planet (1956)
- D-146 SF Will F. Jenkins (As Murray Leinster) The Forgotten Planet (1956)
- D-147 MY Gregory Jones Prowl Cop / Norman Herries My Private Hangman (1956)
- S-148 WE Samuel Peeples (as Brad Ward) The Man From Andersonville (1956)
- D-149 MY Ronald Kayser (as Dale Clark) A Run for the Money / Mark Macklin The Thin Edge of Mania (1955)
- D-150 SF Philip K. Dick The World Jones Made / Margaret St. Clair Agent of the Unknown (1956)
- S-151 NA Robert Novak Climb A Broken Ladder (1956)
- S-152 NA Henry Felsen Medic Mirth (1956)
- S-153 NA Hallam Whitney The Wild Seed (1956)
- D-154 NA Sloan Wilson Voyage To Somewhere (1956)
- D-155 SF Jules Verne A Journey to the Center of the Earth (1956)
- D-156 WE Lee Floren Thruway West / Stephen C. Lawrence The Naked Range (1956)
- D-157 MY Louis Trimble Stab in the Dark / Jonathon Gant Never Say No to a Killer (1956)
- S-158 NA Kim Darien Golden Girl (1956)
- S-159 NA Jack Webb (as John Farr) She Shark (1956)
- D-160 WE Karl Kramer Action Along The Humboldt / Michael Carder Decision at Sundown (1956)
- S-161 NA E. Davis Gag Writer's Private Joke Book (1956)
- D-162 SF Jerry Sohl The Mars Monopoly / R. DeWitt Miller and Anna Hunger The Man Who Lived Forever, (1956)
- D-163 NA Russell Boltar Woman's Doctor (1956)
- D-164 SF Gordon R. Dickson Mankind on The Run / Andre Norton The Crossroads of Time (1956)
- S-165 NA Brant House (ed.) Love And Hisses (1956)
- D-166 WE Samuel A. Peeples (as Samuel Anthony Peeples) Terror at Tres Alamos / Stuart Brock Whispering Canyon (1956)
- D-167 MY Milton K. Ozaki Never Say Die / John Creighton Destroying Angel (1956)
- D-169 SF Jack Williamson And James E. Gunn Star Bridge
- D-170 MY Day Keene Flight By Night / Lawrence Goldman Black Fire (1956)
- S-171 NA Eddie Davis (ed.) Campus Joke Book (1956)
- D-172 WE Robert J. Steelman Stages South / Ben Smith Johnny No-Name (1956)
- D-173 SF Ray Cummings The Man Who Mastered Time / Joseph E. Kelleam Overlords of Space (1956)
- S-174 NA Robert Novak B-Girl (1956)
- D-175 NA Irving Settel (ed.) Best Television Humor of the Year (1956)
- D-176 SF Thomas Calvert McClary Three Thousand Years / Margaret St. Clair The Green Queen (1956)
- D-177 MY Stephen Marlowe (as C.H. Thames) Violence Is Golden / Robert Turner The Girl in the Cop's Pocket (1956)
- D-178 NA Jean Paradise The Savage City (1956)
- S-179 NA Brant House (ed.) Squelches (1956)
- D-180 WE Nelson C. Nye The No-Gun Fighter / Walt Coburn One Step Ahead of the Posse (1956)
- D-181 NA Arthur Conan Doyle and John Dickson Carr The Exploits of Sherlock Holmes (1956)
- D-182 NA Émile Zola Shame / Thérèse Raquin (1956)
- S-183 SF Donald A. Wollheim (Ed.) The End of the World
- D-184 NA J. Mccague The Big Ivy (1956)
- D-185 MY Geoffrey Holmes Build My Gallows High / Harry Whittington The Humming Box (1956)
- D-186 WE Ray Hogan Ex-Marshall / Edward Churchill Steel Horizon (1956)
- D-187 SF A. E. van Vogt The Pawns of Null-A
- S-188 NA Brant House (ed.) They Goofed! (1956)
- D-189 MY Lawrence Treat Weep for a Wanton / Stephen Marlowe Dead on Arrival (1956)
- S-190 NA Henry Lewis Nixon The Golden Couch (1956)
- D-191 NA Frank Slaughter Apalachee Gold (1956)
- D-192 WE Roy Manning Beware of This Tenderfoot / John Callahan Bad Blood at Black Range (1956)
- D-193 SF Philip K. Dick The Man Who Japed / E. C. Tubb The Space-Born (1956)
- D-194 NA Theodor Plievier Moscow (1956)
- D-195 MY Robert Colby The Quaking Widow / Dudley Dean Macgaughy (as Owen Dudley) The Deep End (1956)
- D-196 WE Walt Coburn The Night Branders / Frank Gruber The Highwayman (1956)
- D-197 MY James Byron TNT For Two / Charles Weiser Frey (as Ferguson Findley) Counterfeit Corpse (1956)
- S-198 NA William Bender Jr. Tokyo Intrigue (1957)
- D-199 SF Poul Anderson Planet of No Return / Andre Norton Star Guard (1956)

== 200–299 ==
- D-200 NA Edward J. Ruppelt Unidentified Flying Objects (1956)
- D-201 MY Harry Whittington Across That River / Nathaniel E. Jones Saturday Mountain (1957)
- D-202 NA Leonard Kauffman The Color of Green (1957)
- D-203 MY William Grote Cain's Girlfriend / William L. Rohde Uneasy Lies The Head (1957)
- D-204 WE Paul Durst John Law, Keep Out! / Gordon Donalds The Desperate Donigans (1957)
- D-205 SF Donald A. Wollheim (ed.) The Earth in Peril / Lan Wright Who Speaks of Conquest? (1957)
- D-206 WE Robert Hardy Andrews Great Day in the Morning (1957)
- D-207 NA Charles Grayson Hollywood Doctor
- D-208 WE Glenn Balch Blind Man's Bullets / Barry Cord The Prodigal Gun (1957)
- D-209 MY John Jake A Night For Treason / F.L. Wallace Three Times A Victim (1957)
- D-210 NA Stephen Longstreet The Lion at Morning (1957)
- D-211 SF Philip K. Dick Eye in the Sky (1957)
- D-212 NA H. T. Elmo Hollywood Humor (1957)
- D-213 NA Peter J. Steincrohn How To Stop Killing Yourself (1957)
- D-214 NA Martin L. Weiss Hate Alley
- D-215 SF Eric Frank Russell Three To Conquer / Robert Moore Williams Doomsday Eve (1957)
- D-216 WE Barry Cord Savage Valley / William Colt Macdonald Ridin' Through (1957)
- D-217 MY Bob McKnight Downwind / B.E. Lovell A Rage To Kill (1957)
- D-218 NA Sasha Siemel Tigrero!
- S-219 NA P.A. Hoover Backwater Woman (1957)
- D-220 WE Ray Hogan The Friendless One / John Jakes Wear A Fast Gun (1956)
- D-221 MY Gordon Ashe You've Bet Your Life / Robert Chavis Terror Package (1957)
- D-222 NA R. Frison-Roche First on the Rope (1957)
- D-223 SF Robert Silverberg The 13th Immortal / James E. Gunn This Fortress World (1957)
- D-224 NA Shelby Steger Desire in the Ozarks (1957)
- D-225 MY Kendell Foster Crossen (as M. E. Chaber) A Lonely Walk / Harry Giddings Loser by a Head (1957)
- D-226 WE Edwin Booth Showdown at Warbird / Samuel A. Peeples Doc Colt (1957)
- D-227 SF H. Beam Piper and John J. McGuire Crisis in 2140 / Cyril Judd (Cyril M. Kornbluth and Judith Merril) Gunner Cade (1957)
- D-228 NA David Howarth We Die Alone (1957)
- D-229 NA Walter Whitney Take It Out in Trade (1957)
- D-230 WE Barry Cord Boss of Barbed Wire / Lee Floren Burn 'Em Out! (1957)
- D-231 MY Dudley Dean Macgaughy (as Owen Dudle) Murder For Charity / Edward S. Aarons (as Edward Ronn) Point of Peril (1957)
- D-232 NA Willard Manies The Fixers (1957)
- D-233 SF Rex Gordon First on Mars
- D-234 NA Robert L. Scott Look of the Eagle (1957)
- D-235 MY Jack Webb (as John Farr) The Lady and the Snake / Louis Trimble Nothing To Lose But My Life (1957)
- D-236 WE Edwin Booth Jinx Rider / Ray Hogan Walk A Lonely Trail (1957)
- D-237 SF Robert Silverberg Master of Life and Death / James White The Secret Visitors (1957)
- D-238 NA Clellon Holmes Go (1957)
- D-239 NA G. Harry Stine Earth Satellite and the Race For Space Superiority (1957)
- D-240 WE Wayne C. Lee Broken Wheel Ranch / Tom West Torture Trail (1957)
- D-241 MY Harry Whittington One Deadly Dawn / Wilson Tucker The Hired Target (1957)
- D-242 SF A. E. van Vogt Empire of the Atom / Frank Belknap Long Space Station 1 (1957)
- D-243 NA Michael Wells The Roving Eye (1957)
- D-244 NA Terence Robinson Night Raider of the Atlantic: The Saga of the U-99 (1957)
- D-245 SF Jules Verne Off on a Comet (1957)
- D-246 NA John Harriman The Magnate (1957)
- D-247 MY Ken Lewis Look Out Behind You / John Creighton Not So Evil As Eve (1957)
- D-248 WE Dwight Bennett Newton (as Clement Hardin) Longhorn Law / Ray Hogan Cross Me in Gunsmoke (1957)
- D-249 SF Philip K. Dick The Cosmic Puppets / Andre Norton (as Andrew North) Sargasso of Space (1957)
- D-250 NA Arthur Steuer The Terrible Swift Sword (1957)
- D-251 NA Hamilton Cochran Windward Passage (1957)
- D-252 WE John Callahan The Rawhide Breed / Rod Patterson Prairie Terror (1957)
- D-253 MY Bruce Cassiday The Buried Motive / Prentice Winchell (as Spencer Dean) Marked Down For Murder (1957)
- D-254 NA Marcos Spinelli The Lash of Desire (1957)
- D-255 SF Kenneth Bulmer City Under the Sea / Poul Anderson Star Ways (1957)
- S-256 NA Karl Ludwig Oritz The General (1957)
- D-257 NA Louis Malley Tiger in the Streets (1957)
- D-258 NA Sławomir Rawicz The Long Walk (1957)
- D-259 MY Michael Avallone The Case of the Violent Virgin / The Case of the Bouncing Betty (1957)
- D-260 WE Ray Hogan and Matt Slade Land of the Strangers / Lee Floren The Saddle Wolves (1957)
- D-261 SF Philip K. Dick The Variable Man And Other Stories (1957)
- S-262 NA Leland Jamieson Attack! (1957)
- S-263 NA Virginia M. Harrison (as Wilene Shaw) See How They Run (1957)
- D-264 WE Barry Cord Cain Basin / Lee E. Wells Brother Outlaw (1958)
- D-265 MY Robert Bloch Shooting Star / Robert Bloch Terror in the Night (And Other Stories)
- D-266 SF E. C. Tubb The Mechanical Monarch / Charles L. Fontenay Twice Upon A Time (1958)
- D-267 NA Jim Bosworth Speed Demon (1958)
- D-268 NA Brant House (ed.) Lincoln's Wit, Humorous Tales And Anecdotes By And About Our 16th President (1958)
- D-269 NA Michael Powell Death in the South Atlantic
- D-270 NA Bud Clifton D For Delinquent
- D-271 NA Cliff Howe Lovers And Libertines (1958)
- D-272 WE Lee Floren Riders in the Night / William Hopson Backlash at Cajon Pass
- D-273 MY Ernest Jason Fredericks Shakedown Hotel / John Roscoe and Michael Roscoe (as Mike Roscoe) The Midnight Eye (1958)
- D-274 SF David Mcilwain (As Charles Eric Maine) World Without Men (1958)
- S-275 NA Brant House (ed.) Cartoon Annual #3- The Cream of the Year's Best Cartoons (1958)
- D-276 WE Barry Cord The Gunsmoke Trail / Tom West Lead in His Fists (1958)
- D-277 SF Murray Leinster City on The Moon / Donald A. Wollheim (ed.) Men on The Moon (1958)
- D-278 NA Donald Barr Chidsey This Bright Sword (1957)
- D-279 MY J. Harvey Bond Bye Bye, Baby! / Bob McKnight Murder Mutuel
- D-280 NA James P.S. Devereux The Story of Wake Island
- D-281 NA Norman Vincent Peale (ed.) Guideposts (1958)
- D-282 NA Cliff Howe Scoundrels, Fiends, and Human Monsters (1958)
- D-283 SF Clifford D. Simak City (1958)
- D-284 WE Barry Cord The Guns of Hammer / Edwin Booth The Man Who Killed Tex (1958)
- D-285 MY Bruce Cassiday Brass Shroud / Joseph Linklater Odd Woman Out (1958)
- D-286 SF Robert Silverberg Invaders From Earth / Donald A. Wollheim (as David Grinnell) Across Time (1958)
- D-287 NA Holland M. Smith Coral And Brass (1958)
- D-288 WE Edwin Booth Trail To Tomahawk / John Callhan Land Beyond The Law
- D-289 MY Alan Payne This'll Slay You / John Hawkins and Ward Hawkins Violent City
- D-290 NA P. A. Hoover A Woman Called Trouble (1958)
- D-291 SF Robert Silverberg (as Calvin M. Knox) Lest We forget Thee, Earth / Raymond Z. Gallun People Minus X (1958)
- D-292 NA Booth Mooney The Insiders (1958)
- D-293 NA Vaino Linna The Unknown Soldier (1954)
- D-294 WE John H. Latham Bad Bunch of the Brasada / Walt Coburn Beyond The Wide Missouri (1958)
- D-295 SF Jack Vance Big Planet / The Slaves of The Klau (1958)
- D-296 NA John Clagett Run The River Gauntlet (1958)
- D-297 MY Peter Rabe The Cut of the Whip / Robert Kelston Kill One, Kill Two (1958)
- D-298 WE Paul Evans Thunder Creek Range / William Vance Outlaws Welcome! (1958)
- D-299 SF Andre Norton Star Born / H. Beam Piper and John J. McGuire A Planet For Texans (1958)

== 300–399 ==
- D-300 NA J. Walter Small The Dance Merchants (1958)
- D-301 MY Jack Webb (as John Farr) The Deadly Combo / Russ Winterbotham (as J. Harvey Bond) Murder Isn't Funny (1958)
- D-302 NA Maurice Druon The Iron King (1956)
- D-303 SF Poul Anderson The Snows of Ganymede / War of the Wing-Men (1958)
- D-304 WE Archie Joscelyn River to the Sunset / Ben Smith Trouble at Breakdam (1958)
- D-305 MY Vic Rodell Free-Lance Murder / Louis King Cornered (1958)
- D-306 NA Peyson Antholz All Shook Up (1958)
- D-307 NA Brant House (ed.) From Eve On: Wit And Wisdom About Women (1958)
- D-308 WE Jack M. Bickham Gunman's Gamble / Roy Manning Draw And Die! (1958)
- D-309 SF H. G. Wells The Island of Dr. Moreau (1958)
- D-310 NA Marcos Spinelli Mocambu (1958)
- D-311 SF Robert Silverberg Stepsons of Terra / Lan Wright A Man Called Destiny (1958)
- D-312 NA Harlan Ellison The Deadly Streets (1958)
- D-313 MY Samuel Krasney Design For Dying / J. M. Flynn The Deadly Boodle (1958)
- D-314 NA Blair Ashton Deeds of Darkness (1958)
- D-315 SF Eric Frank Russell The Space Willies / Six Worlds Yonder (1958)
- D-316 WE Rod Patterson A Time For Guns / Barry Cord / Mesquite Johnny (1958)
- D-317 MY John Creighton The Wayward Blonde / Gerry Travis The Big Bite (1958)
- D-318 NA Donald Barr Chidsey Captain Crossbones (1958)
- D-319 NA Hans-Otto Meissner The Man With Three Faces (1958)
- D-320 WE Robert Mccaig The Rangemaster / William Hopson The Last Shoot-Out (1958)
- D-321 MY John Creighton Trial By Perjury / Louis Trimble The Smell of Trouble (1958)
- D-322 SF Robert Moore Williams The Blue Atom / The Void Beyond and Other Stories (1958)
- D-323 NA Brant House The Violent Ones (1958)
- D-324 SF Ray Cummings Brigands of the Moon (1958)
- D-325 NA Irving Werstein July 1863 (1958)
- D-326 NA Wilhelm Johnen Battling The Bombers
- D-327 SF Jeff Sutton First on the Moon
- D-328 WE Merle Constiner The Fourth Gunman / Tom West Slick on the Draw (1958)
- D-329 MY Robert Emmett Mcdowell (as Emmett Mcdowell) Stamped For Death / Robert Emmett Mcdowell (as Emmett Mcdowell) Three for the Gallows (1958)
- D-330 NA Bud Clifton Muscle Boy (1958)
- D-331 SF Kenneth Bulmer The Secret of Zi / Ray Cummings Beyond the Vanishing Point (1958)
- D-332 WE Kermit Welles Blood on Boot Hill / Ben Smith Stranger in Sundown (1959)
- D-333 MY Mike Brett Scream Street / John Creighton Stranglehold (1959)
- D-334 NA Stanley Johnston Queen of the Flat-Tops (1958)
- D-335 SF Poul Anderson The War of Two Worlds / John Brunner Threshold of Eternity (1959)
- D-336 NA Samuel A. Krasney Morals Squad
- D-337 NA Jack Gerstine Play It Cool
- D-338 NA Edward De Roo The Fires of Youth
- D-339 SF Clifford D. Simak Ring Around The Sun
- D-340 SF Philip K. Dick Solar Lottery (1959)
- D-341 NA Rae Loomis The Marina Street Girls (1959)
- D-342 NA Nicholas Gorham Queen's Blade (1959)
- D-343 NA Edward de Roo The Young Wolves (1959)
- D-344 NA Gordon Landsborough Desert Fury (1959)
- D-345 SF Andre Norton (as Andrew North) Plague Ship / Voodoo Planet (1959)
- D-346 WE Ray Hogan Wanted: Alive! / Barry Cord Sherriff of Big Hat (1957)
- D-347 MY Louis Trimble The Corpse Without A Country / Harry Whittington Play For Keeps (1957)
- D-348 WE T.V. Olsen The Man From Nowhere / John L. Shelley The Avenging Gun (1959)
- D-349 MY Leslie Frederick Brett (as Mike Brett) The Guilty Bystander / Russell Robert Winterbotham (as J. Harvey Bond) Kill Me With Kindness (1959)
- D-350 SF Peter George (as Peter Bryant) Red Alert
- D-351 SF Edmond Hamilton The Sun Smasher / Robert Silverberg (as Ivar Jorgenson) Starhaven (1959)
- G-352 NA Francis Leary Fire And Morning (1959)
- D-353 NA Donald A. Wollheim (ed.) The Macabre Reader
- D-354 SF Donald A. Wollheim (Ed.) The Hidden Planet: Science-Fiction Adventures on Venus (1959)
- D-355 NA Bill Strutton and Michael Pearson The Beachhead Spies (1958)
- D-356 WE Paul Durst Kansas Guns / Tom West The Cactus Kid (1958)
- D-357 MY Lester Dent Lady in Peril / Floyd Wallace Wired For Scandal (1959)
- D-358 SF Robert Silverberg (as Calvin M. Knox) The Plot Against Earth / Milton Lesser Recruit for Andromeda (1959)
- D-359 NA John Croydon (as John Cooper) The Haunted Strangler (1959)
- D-360 WE John H. Latham Johnny Sixgun / Barry Cord War in Peaceful Valley (1959)
- D-361 MY James P. Duff Dangerous To Know / Robert Colby Murder Mistress (1959)
- D-362 SF John Brunner The 100th Millennium / Donald A. Wollheim (as David Grinnell) Edge of Time (1959)
- D-363 NA Samuel A. Krasney The Rapist (1959)
- D-364 NA Donald Barr Chidsey The Pipes Are Calling (1959)
- D-365 NA Robert Eunson MIG Alley (1959)
- D-366 SF Alan E. Nourse And J. A. Meyer The Invaders Are Coming
- D-367 MY Louis Trimble Till Death Do Us Part / Charles E. Fritch Negative of a Nude (1959)
- D-368 WE Ray Hogan Hangman's Valley / Joseph Gage A Score To Settle (1959)
- D-369 SF Brian W. Aldiss Vanguard From Alpha / Kenneth Bulmer The Changeling Worlds (1959)
- D-370 NA Paul Ernst (as Ernest Jason Fredericks) Cry Flood (1959)
- G-371 NA Theodor Plievier Berlin (1959)
- D-372 WE Dan Kirby Cimarron Territory / Glenn Balach Grass Greed (1959)
- D-373 MY Jack Karney The Knave of Diamonds / Doug Warren Scarlet Starlet (1959)
- D-374 NA Burgess Leonard The Thoroughbred and the Tramp (1959)
- D-375 SF Damon Knight Masters of Evolution / George O. Smith Fire in the Heavens (1959)
- G-376 NA J. Harvey Howells The Big Company Look (1959)
- D-377 SF Jeff Sutton Bombs in Orbit (1959)
- D-378 NA Virginia M. Harrison (as Wilene Shaw) Out For Kicks
- D-379 MY William Woody Mistress of Horror House / Jay Flynn (as J. M. Flynn) Drink with the Dead (1959)
- D-380 WE William Heuman My Brother The Gunman / Barry Cord Concho Valley (1959)
- D-381 SF Jerry Sohl One Against Herculum / Andre Norton Secret of the Lost Race (1959)
- G-382 NA C. T. Ritchie Willing Maid
- D-383 NA David Stacton (as Bud Clifton) The Murder Specialist (1959)
- D-384 WE Louis Trimble Mountain Ambush / Jack M. Bickham Feud Fury
- D-385 SF John Brunner Echo in the Skull / Alan E. Nourse Rocket To Limbo (1959)
- G-386 NA Richard O'Connor The Sulu Sword (1959)
- D-387 MY Laine Fisher Fare Prey / Bob McKnight The Bikini Bombshell (1959)
- D-388 SF H. G. Wells When The Sleeper Wakes (1959)
- D-389 NA Cyril Henry Coles and Adelaide Manning (jointly as Manning Cole) No Entry (1959)
- G-390 NA R. Foreman Long Pig
- D-391 SF John Brunner The World Swappers / A. E. van Vogt Siege of the Unseen (1959)
- D-392 WE Tom West Twisted Trail / Archie Joscelyn The Man From Salt Creek (1959)
- D-393 MY Joseph L. Chadwick (as John Creighton) Evil Is The Night / Robert A. Levey Dictators Die Hard (1959)
- D-394 NA Donald Barr Chidsey The Flaming Island (1959)
- D-395 WE Allan Keller Thunder at Harper's Ferry (1959)
- D-396 NA Rae Loomis Luisita
- D-397 SF Jules Verne Journey to the Center of the Earth
- D-398 NA Noland Miller Why Am I So Beat
- D-399 NA Edward Adler Living It Up (1955)

== 400–499 ==
- D-400 WE Barry Cord Last Chance at Devil's Canyon / Gordon D. Shirreffs Shadow of a Gunman (1959)
- D-401 MY Louis Trimble Obit Deferred / Tedd Thomey I Want Out (1959)
- G-402 NA Daniel P. Mannix Kiboko (1959)
- D-403 SF Murray Leinster The Mutant Weapon / The Pirates of Zan (1959)
- D-404 NA Clifford Anderson The Hollow Hero (1959)
- D-405 SF Rex Gordon First to the Stars
- D-406 NA Edward Deroo Go, Man, Go! (1959)
- D-407 SF Poul Anderson We Claim These Stars! / Robert Silverberg The Planet Killers (1959)
- D-408 WE Edwin Booth Wyoming Welcome / Giles A. Lutz Law of the Trigger (1959)
- D-409 MY Louis Trimble Cargo for the Styx / Jay Flynn (as J.M. Flynn) Terror Tournament (1959)
- D-410 NA Donald Barr Chidsey Buccaneer's Blade (1959)
- D-411 MY Bob McKnight Swamp Sanctuary
- D-412 WE E.A. Alman Ride The Long Night / Gordon D. Shirreffs Apache Butte (1959)
- D-413 SF Harlan Ellison The Man With Nine Lives / A Touch of Infinity (1959)
- D-414 NA Alexandre Dumas The Companions of Jehu (1960)
- D-415 MY Prentice Winchell (as Stewart Sterling) ''Fire on Fear Street / Dead Certain (1960)
- D-416 NA John Kenneth The Big Question (1960)
- D-417 NA Edward de Roo Rumble at the Housing Project (1960)
- D-418 WE C.S. Park The Quiet Ones / Tom West Nothing But My Gun (1960)
- D-419 MY Bernard Thielen Open Season / Bob McKnight A Slice of Death (1958)
- D-420 NA John A. Williams The Angry Ones (1960)
- D-421 SF Philip K. Dick Dr. Futurity / John Brunner Slavers of Space (1960)
- D-422 SF Anthony Boucher and J. Francis Mccomas (eds.) The Best From F & SF, 3rd Series
- D-423 NA Browning Norton Tidal Wave (1960)
- D-424 WE Lee Richards Shoot Out at the Way Station / Robert Mccaig Wild Justice (1960)
- D-425 MY Roberta Elizabeth Sebenthal (as Paul Kruger) Dig Her A Grave / Joseph L. Chadwick (as John Creighton) A Half Interest in Murder (1960)
- D-426 NA Robert S. Close Penal Colony
- D-427 SF Robert Moore Williams World of the Masterminds / To the End of Time and Other Stories (1960)
- D-428 NA P.A. Hoover Scowtown Woman
- D-429 NA Charles Runyon The Anatomy of Violence (1960)
- D-430 WE William Hopson Born Savage / Ray Hogan The Hasty Hangman (1960)
- D-431 SF A. E. van Vogt Earth's Last Fortress / George O. Smith Lost in Space (1960)
- D-432 NA Donn Broward Convention Queen (1960)
- D-433 MY Jack Bradley If Hate Could Kill / Talmage Powell The Smasher (1960)
- D-434 NA Jules Verne The Purchase of the North Pole (1960)
- D-435 NA C.T. Ritchie Lady in Bondage (1960)
- D-436 WE Tom West The Phantom Pistoleer / Giles A. Lutz The Challenger (1960)
- D-437 SF Andre Norton The Sioux Spaceman / Richard Wilson And Then The Town Took Off (1960)
- D-438 NA Charles Fogg The Panic Button (1960)
- D-439 MY Duane Decker The Devil's Punchbowl / Owen Dudley Run If You Can (1960)
- G-440 NA Andrew Hepburn Letter of Marque (1960)
- D-441 NA Lloyd E. Olson Skip Bomber (1960)
- D-442 WE Jack M. Bickham Killer's Paradise / Rod Patterson Rider of the Rincon (1960)
- D-443 SF Manly Wade Wellman The Dark Destroyers / Brian W. Aldiss Bow Down to Nul (1960)
- D-444 NA Shepard Rifkin Desire Island (1960)
- D-445 MY Robert Emmett Mcdowell (as Emmett Mcdowell) Bloodline To Murder / In at the Kill (1960)
- D-446 NA Edward Moore Flight 685 Is Overdue (1960)
- D-447 MY Bob McKnight Kiss The Babe Goodbye / J. M. Flynn The Hot Chariot (1960)
- D-448 WE Lee Floren Pistol-Whipper / Archie Joscelyn (as Al Cody) Winter Range (1960)
- D-449 SF Gordon R. Dickson The Genetic General / Time to Teleport (1960)
- D-450 WE Tom West Side Me With Sixes / Ray Hogan The Ridgerunner (1960)
- D-451 MY Steve Ward Odds Against Linda / Robert Martin A Key to the Morgue (1960)
- D-452 NA Joe L. Hensley The Colour of Hate (1960)
- D-453 SF Kenneth Bulmer The Earth Gods Are Coming / Margaret St. Clair The Games of Neith (1960)
- G-454 NA Anne Powers Ride East! Ride West! (1960)
- D-455 SF William A. P. White (as Anthony Boucher) (Ed.) The Best From Fantasy And Science Fiction, 4th Series (1960)
- D-456 WE Edwin Booth Danger Trail / Edwin Booth The Desperate Dude
- D-457 SF Philip K. Dick Vulcan's Hammer / John Brunner The Skynappers (1960)
- D-458 NA Harry Wilcox (as Mark Derby) Womanhunt (1960)
- D-459 MY Howard J. Olmsted The Hot Diary / J. M. Flynn Ring Around A Rogue (1960)
- D-460 NA James Macgregor When The Ship Sank (1960)
- D-461 SF Andre Norton The Time Traders (1960)
- D-462 WE Jack M. Bickham The Useless Gun / John H. Latham The Long Fuse (1960)
- D-463 MY Prentice Winchell (as Stewart Sterling) Dying Room Only / The Body in the Bed (1960)
- D-464 NA Virginia M. Harrison (as Wilene Shaw) Tame The Wild Flesh (1960)
- D-465 SF John Brunner The Atlantic Abomination / Donald A. Wollheim (as David Grinnell) The Martian Missile (1960)
- D-466 WE Richard O'Conner Wild Bill Hickok (1960)
- D-467 NA William C. Anderson Five, Four, Three, Two, One-Pfftt Or 12,000 Men And One Bikini (1960)
- D-468 SF Eric Frank Russell Sentinel of Space (1960)
- D-469 MY Bob McKnight Running Scared / Talmage Powell Man-Killer (1960)
- D-470 WE Gene Olsen The Man Who Was Morgan / Ben Smith The Maverick (1960)
- D-471 SF John Brunner Sanctuary in the Sky / Jack Sharkey The Secret Martians (1960)
- D-472 NA Harry Whittington A Night For Screaming
- D-473 SF Eric Temple Bell (As John Taine) The Greatest Adventure
- D-474 NA Leland Lovelace Lost Mines & Hidden Treasure
- D-475 WE Samuel Peeples (as Brad Ward) The Marshal of Medicine Bend
- D-476 WE Tom West Double Cross Dinero / Edwin Booth Last Valley (1960)
- D-477 MY Louis Trimble The Duchess of Skid Row / Love Me And Die (1961)
- D-478 SF Jeff Sutton Spacehive (1960)
- D-479 SF Wilson Tucker To the Tombaugh Station / Poul Anderson Earthman Go Home! (1960)
- G-480 WE John Brick The Strong Men (1960)
- D-481 NA Joseph F. Dinneen The Biggest Holdup (1960)
- D-482 SF A. E. van Vogt The Weapon Shops of Isher (1961)
- D-483 MY Russell Robert Winterbotham (as J. Harvey Bond) If Wishes Were Hearses / Bruce Cassiday The Corpse in the Picture Window (1961)
- D-484 WE Ray Hogan Ambush at Riflestock / Archie Joscelyn (as Al Cody) Dead Man's Spurs (1961)
- D-485 SF Robert A. W. Lowndes The Puzzle Planet / Lloyd Biggle, Jr. The Angry Espers (1961)
- D-486 NA Edward De Roo The Little Caesars
- D-487 NA Leonard Sanders Four-Year Hitch
- D-488 NA Dan Brennan Third Time Down (1961)
- D-489 MY R. Arthur Somebody's Walking Over My Grave / John Miles Bickham (as John Miles) Dally with a Deadly Doll (1961)
- D-490 SF Donald A. Wollheim (Ed.) Adventures on Other Planets (1961)
- D-491 SF Fritz Leiber The Big Time / Fritz Leiber The Mind-Spider and Other Stories (1961)
- D-492 WE William Hopson Winter Drive / Giles A. Lutz The Wild Quarry (1961)
- D-493 NA Ellery Queen (ed.) The Queen's Awards, Fifth Series
- D-494 WE Leslie T. White Log Jam (1961)
- D-495 NA Samuel A. Krasney A Mania For Blondes (1961)
- D-496 WE Steven G. Lawrence With Blood in Their Eyes / Tom West Killer's Canyon (1961)
- D-497 SF John Brunner (as Keith Woodcott) I Speak For Earth / Ray Cummings Wandl The Invader (1961)
- D-498 SF Andre Norton Galactic Derelict (1961)
- D-499 MY Frederick C. Davis Night Drop / High Heel Homicide (1961)

== 500–599 ==
- G-500 WE George D. Hendricks The Bad Man of the West (1961)
- D-501 NA David Stacton (as Bud Clifton) Let Him Go Hang (1961)
- D-502 WE Paul Evan Lehman Troubled Range / Archie Joscelyn (as Al Cody) Long Night at Lodgepole (1961)
- D-503 NA Frances Nichols Hanna (as Fan Nichols) The Girl in the Death Seat (1961)
- D-504 SF Jules Verne Master of the World (1961)
- D-505 MY Louis Trimble The Surfside Caper / Robert Colby In A Vanishing Room (1961)
- D-506 NA Harry Harrison Kroll The Brazen Dream (1961)
- D-507 SF Kenneth Bulmer Beyond the Silver Sky / John Brunner Meeting at Infinity (1961)
- D-508 NA Donald A. Wollheim (ed.) More Macabre (1961)
- D-509 SF Andre Norton The Beast Master / Star Hunter (1961)
- D-510 WE Harry Whittington The Searching Rider / Jack M. Bickham Hangman's Territory (1961)
- D-511 MY J. M. Flynn One for the Death House / Bob McKnight Drop Dead, Please (1961)
- D-512 NA Donald Barr Chidsey Marooned (1961)
- D-513 NA Harlan Ellison The Juvies
- D-514 WE Gordon D. Shirreffs Hangin' Pards / Gordon D. Shirreffs Ride A Lone Trail (1961)
- D-515 MY Robert Colby Kill Me A Fortune / Prentice Winchell (as Stewart Sterling) Five Alarm Funeral (1961)
- D-516 SF Otis Adelbert Kline The Swordsman of Mars (1961)
- D-517 SF Clifford Simak The Trouble With Tycho / A. Bertram Chandler Bring Back Yesterday (1961)
- D-518 NA Bill Miller and Robert Wade (as Wade Miller) Nightmare Cruise (1961)
- D-519 NA Carroll V. Glines and Wendell F. Moseley Air Rescue! (1961)
- D-520 NA Virginia M. Harrison (as Wilene Shaw) One Foot in Hell (1961)
- D-521 NA Margaret Howe The Girl in the White Cap (1961)
- D-522 NA Hal Ellson A Nest of Fear (1961)
- D-523 NA John Jakes (as Jay Scotland) Strike The Black Flag (1961)
- D-524 NA Maysie Greig (as Jennifer Ames) Overseas Nurse (1961)
- D-525 SF Murray Leinster This World Is Taboo (1961)
- D-526 NA Kim Darien Obsession (1961)
- D-527 SF Andre Norton Star Guard (1961)
- D-528 SF Murray Leinster The Forgotten Planet
- D-529 NA Leslie Turner White The Pirate and the Lady (1961)
- D-530 SF Robert Moore Williams The Day They H-Bombed Los Angeles (1961)
- D-531 SF Otis Adelbert Kline The Outlaws of Mars
- D-532 NA Isabel Capeto (as Isabel Cabot) Nurse Craig (1961)
- D-533 NA H. T. Elmo Mad. Ave. (1961)
- D-534 SF Andre Norton Daybreak – 2250 A. D. (1961)
- D-535 SF Ray Cummings The Shadow Girl (1962)
- D-536 NA Peggy Gaddis The Nurse and the Pirate (1961)
- D-537 SF H. G. Wells The Island of Dr. Moreau (1961)
- D-538 SF Isaac Asimov The 1,000 Year Plan (1961)
- D-539 NA Mary Mann Fletcher Psychiatric Nurse (1962)
- D-540 NA Arlene Hale School Nurse (1962)
- D-541 SF Alan E. Nourse Scavengers in Space (1962)
- D-542 SF Andre Norton The Last Planet (1962)
- D-543 NA Harriet Kathryn Myers Small Town Nurse (1962)
- D-544 SF Frank Belknap Long Space Station #1 (1962)
- D-545 NA Suzanne Roberts Emergency Nurse (1962)
- D-546 SF Andre Norton The Crossroads of Time
- D-547 SF John Brunner The Super Barbarians (1962)
- D-548 NA Dudley Dean Mcgaughty (as Dean Owen) End of the World (1962)
- D-549 NA Tracy Adams Spotlight on Nurse Thorne (1962)
- D-550 SF Poul Anderson No World of Their Own (1962)
- D-551 SF Peter George (as Peter Bryant) Red Alert
- D-552 NA Patricia Libby Hollywood Nurse
- D-553 NA William Hope Hodgson The House on the Borderland (1962)
- D-554 NA Jean Francis Webb (as Ethel Hamill) Runaway Nurse (1962)
- D-555 SF Jack Williamson The Trial of Terra (1962)
- D-556 NA Ruth Macleod A Nurse For Dr. Sterling (1962)
- D-557 NA Florence Stuart Hope Wears White (1962)
- D-558 NA Suzanne Roberts Campus Nurse (1962)
- D-559 NA Jane L. Sears Ski Resort Nurse (1962)
- D-560 NA Robert H. Boyer Medic in Love (1962)
- D-561 NA Ann Rush Nell Shannon R. N. (1963)
- D-562 NA Patricia Libby Cover Girl Nurse (1963)
- D-563 NA Arlene Hale Leave It To Nurse Kathy (1963)
- D-564 NA Harriet Kathryn Myers Prodigal Nurse
- D-565 NA Ray Dorlen The Heart of Dr. Hilary (1963)
- D-566 NA Suzanne Roberts Julie Jones, Cape Canaveral Nurse (1963)
- D-567 NA Isabel Moore A Challenge For Nurse Melanie (1963)
- D-568 SF Poul Anderson Star Ways (1962)
- D-569 NA Arlene Hale Dude Ranch Nurse (1963)
- D-570 WE L. L. Foreman Spanish Grant (1963)
- D-571 NA Katherine Mccomb Princess of White Starch (1963)
- D-572 WE Brian Garfield (as Frank Wynne) Arizona Rider
- D-573 WE Louis Trimble (as Stuart Brock) Whispering Canyon (1963)
- D-574 WE Louis L'Amour Kilkenny (1954)
- D-575 NA Peggy Dern A Nurse Called Hope (1963)
- D-576 NA Dorothy Karns Dowdell Border Nurse (1963)
- D-577 NA Sarah Frances Moore Legacy of Love (1963)
- D-578 WE Brian Garfield The Lawbringers (1963)
- D-579 NA Suzanne Roberts Hootenanny Nurse (1964)
- D-580 NA Arlene Hale Symptoms of Love (1964)
- D-581 NA Suzanne Roberts Co-Ed in White (1964)
- D-582 NA Joan Sargent My Love An Altar (1964)
- D-583 NA Tracy Adams Hotel Nurse (1964)
- D-584 NA Monica Edwards Airport Nurse (1964)
- D-585 NA Arlene Hale Nurse Marcie's Island (1964)
- D-586 NA Barbara Grabendike San Francisco Nurse
- D-587 NA Arlene Hale Nurse Connor Comes Home (1964)
- D-588 WE Merle Constiner Short Trigger Man
- D-589 NA Virginia B. Mcdonnell The Nurse with the Silver Skates (1964)
- D-590 WE Lin Searles Stampede at Hourglass (1964)
- D-591 NA Monica Heath (as Arlene J. Fitzgerald) Northwest Nurse (1964)
- D-592 WE Nelson Nye Gunslick Mountain (1964)
- D-593 NA Suzanne Roberts Sisters in White (1965)
- D-594 WE Louis Trimble The Desperate Deputy of Cougar Hill (1965)
- D-595 NA Ruth Macleod Nurse Ann in Surgery (1965)
- D-596 NA Arlene Hale Nurses on the Run (1965)
- D-597 WE L. P. Holmes The Hardest Man in the Sierras (1965)
- D-598 NA Arlene Hale Disaster Area Nurse (1965)
- D-599 NA Patricia Libby Winged Victory For Nurse Kerry (1965)
