= List of Ace mystery double titles =

Ace Books published 135 mystery Ace doubles between 1952 and 1965 in dos-a-dos format.

== Genres and Collectability ==
Ace published science fiction, mysteries, and westerns, as well as books not in any of these genres. Collectors of these genres have found the Ace doubles an attractive set of books to collect, because of the unusual appearance of the dos-a-dos format.

The list given here gives a date of publication; in all cases this refers to the date of publication by Ace, and not the date of original publication of the novels. For more information about the history of these titles, see Ace Books, which includes a discussion of the serial numbering conventions used and an explanation of the letter-code system.

== D Series ==
- D-1 MY Samuel W. Taylor The Grinning Gismo / Keith Vining Too Hot For Hell (1952)
- D-3 MY Mel Colton The Big Fix / Kate Clugston Twist the Knife Slowly (A Murderer in the House) (1952)
- D-5 MY Eaton R. Goldthwaite The Scarlet Spade / Harry Whittington Drawn To Evil (1952)
- D-7 MY Stephen Ransome I, the Executioner (False Bounty) / Harry Whittington So Dead My Love! (1953)
- D-9 MY Michael Morgan Decoy / Sherwood King If I Die Before I Wake (1953)
- D-11 MY Day Keene Mrs. Homicide / William L. Stuart Dead Ahead
- D-15 MY William S. Burroughs (as William Lee) Junkie / Maurice Helbrant Narcotic Agent (1953)
- D-16 MY Edmond de Goncourt and J. De Goncourt Germinie / Paul Bourget Crime D'Amour (1953)
- D-17 MY William Campbell Gault (as Roney Scott) Shakedown / Howard Fast (as Walter Ericson) The Darkness Within
- D-19 MY Hal Braham (as Mel Colton) Never Kill A Cop / Leslie Edgley Fear No More (1953)
- D-21 MY John N. Makris Nightshade / Lester Dent High Stakes (1953)
- D-23 MY Louis Trimble (as Stuart Brock) Bring Back Her Body / Richard Sale Passing Strange (1953)
- D-27 MY Bruno Fischer The Fingered Man / Hal Braham (as Mel Colton) Double Take (1953)
- D-29 MY Ross Laurence The Fast Buck / J. F. Hutton Dead Man Friday
- D-33 MY Carl G. Hodges Murder By The Pack / Frank Kane About Face
- D-37 MY Marvin Claire The Drowning Wire / Will Oursler Departure Delayed (1953)
- D-40 MY Cornell Woolrich (as William Irish) Waltz Into Darkness / Malden Grange Bishop Scylla
- D-41 MY Day Keene Death House Doll / Thomas B. Dewey Mourning After (1953)
- D-45 MY Martin L. Weiss Dead Hitches A Ride / Leslie Edgley Tracked Down (1954)
- D-47 MY Joe Barry Kiss And Kill / Richard Powell On The Hook (1954)
- D-49 MY Dan Cushman Tongking! / Charles Grayson Golden Temptress
- D-51 MY Emmett Mcdowell Switcheroo / Lawrence Treat Over The Edge (1954)
- D-55 MY Robert Turner The Tobacco Auction Murders / Michael Stark Kill-Box
- D-57 MY A. S. Fleischman Counterspy Express / M. V. Heberden (as Charles L. Leonard) Treachery In Trieste (1954)
- D-59 MY Robert Bloch Spiderweb / David Alexander The Corpse In My Bed (1951)
- D-63 MY Harry Whittington You'll Die Next! / Frederick C. Davis Drag The Dark
- D-71 MY John Creasey (as Gordon Ashe) Drop Dead! / Margaret Scherf The Case Of The Hated Senator (1954)
- D-77 MY Leigh Brackett (as George Sanders) Stranger At Home / Stephen Marlowe Catch The Brass Ring (1954)
- D-81 MY John A. Saxon Liability Limited / Sheldon Stark Too Many Sinners
- D-89 MY Stephen Marlowe Turn Left For Murder / Ruth Wilson and Alexander Wilson Death Watch (1955)
- D-101 MY Jack Karney Knock 'Em Dead / Hal Braham (as Mel Colton) Point Of No Escape
- D-109 MY Dale Clark Mambo To Murder / Sterling Noel I See Red (1955)
- D-115 MY Harry Whittington One Got Away / Cleve F. Adams Shady Lady (1955)
- D-123 MY Gil Brewer The Squeeze / Frank Diamond Love Me To Death (1955)
- D-129 MY Day Keene The Dangling Carrot / Norman C. Rosenthal Silenced Witnesses (1955)
- D-135 MY Milton K. Ozaki Maid For Murder / Rene Brabazon Raymond (as James Hadley Chase) Dead Ringer (1955)
- D-147 MY Gregory Jones Prowl Cop / Norman Herries My Private Hangman (1956)
- D-149 MY Ronald Kayser (as Dale Clark) A Run For The Money / Mark Macklin The Thin Edge Of Mania (1955)
- D-157 MY Louis Trimble Stab In The Dark / Jonathon Gant Never Say No To A Killer
- D-167 MY Milton K. Ozaki Never Say Die / John Creighton Destroying Angel (1956)
- D-170 MY Day Keene Flight By Night / Lawrence Goldman Black Fire
- D-177 MY Stephen Marlowe (as C.H. Thames) Violence Is Golden / Robert Turner The Girl In The Cop's Pocket (1956)
- D-185 MY Daniel Mainwaring (as Geoffrey Homes) Build My Gallows High / Harry Whittington The Humming Box (1956)
- D-189 MY Lawrence Treat Weep For A Wanton / Stephen Marlowe Dead On Arrival (1956)
- D-195 MY Robert Colby The Quaking Widow / Dudley Dean Macgaughy (as Owen Dudley) The Deep End
- D-197 MY James Byron TNT For Two / Charles Weiser Frey (as Ferguson Findley) Counterfeit Corpse (1956)
- D-201 MY Harry Whittington Across That River / Nathaniel E. Jones Saturday Mountain (1957)
- D-203 MY William Grote Cain's Girl Friend / William L. Rohde Uneasy Lies The Head (1957)
- D-209 MY John Jake A Night For Treason / F. L. Wallace Three Times A Victim (1957)
- D-217 MY Bob McKnight Downwind / B. E. Lovell A Rage To Kill (1957)
- D-221 MY Gordon Ashe You've Bet Your Life / Robert Chavis Terror Package (1957)
- D-225 MY Kendell Foster Crossen (as M. E. Chaber) A Lonely Walk / Harry Giddings Loser By A Head (1957)
- D-231 MY Dudley Dean Macgaughy (as Owen Dudle) Murder For Charity / Edward S. Aarons (as Edward Ronn) Point Of Peril (1957)
- D-235 MY Jack Webb (as John Farr) The Lady And The Snake / Louis Trimble Nothing To Lose But My Life (1957)
- D-241 MY Harry Whittington One Deadly Dawn / Wilson Tucker The Hired Target (1957)
- D-247 MY Ken Lewis Look Out Behind You / John Creighton Not So Evil As Eve (1957)
- D-253 MY Bruce Cassiday The Buried Motive / Prentice Winchell (as Spencer Dean) Marked Down For Murder (1957)
- D-259 MY Michael Avallone The Case Of The Violent Virgin / The Case Of The Bouncing Betty (1957)
- D-265 MY Robert Bloch Shooting Star / Robert Bloch Terror In The Night (And Other Stories)
- D-273 MY Ernest Jason Fredericks Shakedown Hotel / John Roscoe and Michael Roscoe (as Mike Roscoe) The Midnight Eye (1958)
- D-279 MY J. Harvey Bond Bye Bye, Baby! / Bob McKnight Murder Mutuel
- D-285 MY Bruce Cassiday Brass Shroud / Joseph Linklater Odd Woman Out (1958)
- D-289 MY Alan Payne This'll Slay You / John Hawkins and Ward Hawkins Violent City
- D-297 MY Peter Rabe The Cut Of The Whip / Robert Kelston Kill One, Kill Two (1958)
- D-301 MY Jack Webb (as John Farr) The Deadly Combo / Russ Winterbotham (as J. Harvey Bond) Murder Isn't Funny (1958)
- D-305 MY Vic Rodell Free-Lance Murder / Louis King Cornered (1958)
- D-313 MY Samuel Krasney Design For Dying / J. M. Flynn The Deadly Boodle (1958)
- D-317 MY John Creighton The Wayward Blonde / Gerry Travis The Big Bite (1958)
- D-321 MY John Creighton Trial By Perjury / Louis Trimble The Smell Of Trouble (1958)
- D-329 MY Robert Emmett Mcdowell (as Emmett Mcdowell) Stamped For Death / Robert Emmett Mcdowell (as Emmett Mcdowell) Three For The Gallows (1958)
- D-333 MY Mike Brett Scream Street / John Creighton Stranglehold (1959)
- D-347 MY Louis Trimble The Corpse Without A Country / Harry Whittington Play For Keeps (1957)
- D-349 MY Leslie Frederick Brett (as Mike Brett) The Guilty Bystander / Russell Robert Winterbotham (as J. Harvey Bond) Kill Me With Kindness (1959)
- D-357 MY Lester Dent Lady In Peril / Floyd Wallace Wired For Scandal (1959)
- D-361 MY James P. Duff Dangerous To Know / Robert Colby Murder Mistress (1959)
- D-367 MY Louis Trimble Till Death Do Us Part / Charles E. Fritch Negative Of A Nude (1959)
- D-373 MY Jack Karney The Knave Of Diamonds / Doug Warren Scarlet Starlet (1959)
- D-379 MY William Woody Mistress Of Horror House / Jay Flynn (as J. M. Flynn) Drink With The Dead (1959)
- D-387 MY Laine Fisher Fare Prey / Bob McKnight The Bikini Bombshell (1959)
- D-393 MY Joseph L. Chadwick (as John Creighton) Evil Is The Night / Robert A. Levey Dictators Die Hard (1959)
- D-401 MY Louis Trimble Obit Deferred / Tedd Thomey I Want Out (1959)
- D-409 MY Louis Trimble Cargo For The Styx / Jay Flynn (as J.M. Flynn) Terror Tournament (1959)
- D-415 MY Prentice Winchell (as Stewart Sterling) ''Fire On Fear Street / Dead Certain (1960)
- D-419 MY Bernard Thielen Open Season / Bob McKnight A Slice Of Death (1958)
- D-425 MY Roberta Elizabeth Sebenthal (as Paul Kruger) Dig Her A Grave / Joseph L. Chadwick (as John Creighton) A Half Interest In Murder (1960)
- D-433 MY Jack Bradley If Hate Could Kill / Talmage Powell The Smasher (1960)
- D-439 MY Duane Decker The Devil's Punchbowl / Owen Dudley Run If You Can (1960)
- D-445 MY Robert Emmett Mcdowell (as Emmett Mcdowell) Bloodline To Murder / In At The Kill (1960)
- D-447 MY Bob McKnight Kiss The Babe Goodbye / J. M. Flynn The Hot Chariot (1960)
- D-451 MY Steve Ward Odds Against Linda / Robert Martin A Key To The Morgue (1960)
- D-459 MY Howard J. Olmsted The Hot Diary / J. M. Flynn Ring Around A Rogue (1960)
- D-463 MY Prentice Winchell (as Stewart Sterling) Dying Room Only / The Body In The Bed (1960)
- D-469 MY Bob McKnight Running Scared / Talmage Powell Man-Killer (1960)
- D-477 MY Louis Trimble The Duchess Of Skid Row / Love Me And Die (1961)
- D-483 MY Russell Robert Winterbotham (as J. Harvey Bond) If Wishes Were Hearses / Bruce Cassiday The Corpse In The Picture Window (1961)
- D-489 MY R. Arthur Somebody's Walking Over My Grave / John Miles Bickham (as John Miles) Dally With A Deadly Doll (1961)
- D-499 MY Frederick C. Davis Night Drop / High Heel Homicide (1961)
- D-505 MY Louis Trimble The Surfside Caper / Robert Colby In A Vanishing Room (1961)
- D-511 MY J. M. Flynn One For The Death House / Bob McKnight Drop Dead, Please (1961)
- D-515 MY Robert Colby Kill Me A Fortune / Prentice Winchell (as Stewart Sterling) Five Alarm Funeral (1961)

== F Series ==
- F-102 MY Bob McKnight The Flying Eye / Clayton Fox Never Forget, Never Forgive (1961)
- F-107 MY Chester Warwick My Pal, The Killer / John Trinian Scratch A Thief (1961)
- F-111 MY J. M. Flynn The Girl From Las Vegas / Robert Martin To Have And To Kill (1960)
- F-115 MY John Creighton The Blonde Cried Murder / Fletcher Flora Killing Cousins (1961)
- F-121 MY Helen Nielson Sing Me A Murder / Helen Nielson Woman Missing And Other Stories (1961)
- F-125 MY J. M. Flynn Deep Six / Frank Diamond The Widow Maker (1961)
- F-130 MY J. M. Flynn The Screaming Cargo / James A. Howard The Bullet-Proof Martyr (1961)
- F-143 MY Bob McKnight A Stone Around Her Neck / Clayton Fox End Of A Big Wheel (1962)
- F-155 MY Lionel White A Death At Sea / The Time Of Terror (1961)
- F-166 MY Georges Simenon Maigret And The Reluctant Witness / Maigret Has Scruples (1958)
- F-229 MY Louis Trimble The Dead And The Deadly / Bob McKnight Homicide Handicap (1963)

== G Series ==
- G-501 MY Charlotte Armstrong Lewi (as Charlotte Armstrong) Incident At A Corner / The Unsuspected (1965)
- G-503 MY Ursula Curtiss The Face Of The Tiger / The Stairway (1962)
- G-506 MY Doris Miles Disney Black Mail / Did She Fall Or Was She Pushed?
- G-508 MY Ruth Fenisong The Schemers / But Not Forgotten (1965)
- G-509 MY Elisabeth Sanxay Holding The Virgin Huntress / The Innocent Mrs. Duff (1951)
- G-511 MY Charlotte Armstrong Lewi (as Charlotte Armstrong) The Chocolate Cobweb / Who's Been Sitting In My Chair? (1965)
- G-512 MY Elisabeth Sanxay Holding The Blank Wall / The Girl Who Had To Die (1965)
- G-513 MY Charlotte Armstrong Lewi (as Charlotte Armstrong) Then Came Two Women / Catch As Catch Can (1965)
- G-518 MY Helen Reilly Follow Me / The Opening Door (1965)
- G-519 MY Elisabeth Sanxay Holding The Old Battle Axe / The Obstinate Murderer (1965)
- G-521 MY Charlotte Armstrong Lewi (as Charlotte Armstrong) Mischief / The Better To Eat You (1965)
- G-523 MY Ursula Curtiss The Forbidden Garden / Hours To Kill (1965)
- G-524 MY Elisabeth Sanxay Holding Who's Afraid? / Widow's Mite (1965)
- G-525 MY Dana Lyon The Tentacles / Spin The Web Tight (1965)
- G-526 MY Charlotte Armstrong Lewi (as Charlotte Armstrong) The Mark Of The Hand / The Dream Walker (1965)
- G-528 MY Helen Reilly Certain Sleep / Ding Dong Bell (1965)
- G-529 MY Dorothy Miles Disney Unappointed Rounds / Mrs. Meeker's Money (1965)
- G-530 MY Elisabeth Sanxay Holding The Unfinished Crime / Net Of Cobwebs (1963)
- G-531 MY Helen Reilly Not Me, Inspector / The Canvas Dagger (1965)
- G-533 MY Charlotte Armstrong Lewi (as Charlotte Armstrong) The Black-Eyed Stranger / The One-Faced Girl (1965)
- G-534 MY Elisabeth Sanxay Holding Kill Joy / Speak Of The Devil (1965)
- G-535 MY Dana Lyon The Lost One / The Frightened Child (1965)
- G-539 MY Hilda Lawrence Duet In Death: Composition For Four Hands / Duet In Death: The House (1965)
- G-543 MY Mildred Davis The Dark Place / They Buried A Man (1965)
