= John Farr =

John Farr may refer to:

- John Farr (British politician) (1922–1997), Conservative Party politician
- John R. Farr (1857–1933), Pennsylvania congressman
- John Farr, nom-de-plume of the novelist Jack Webb

== See also ==
- John N. Pharr (1829–1903), Louisiana businessperson and politician
