= Leithead =

Leithead is a surname. Notable people with this surname include:

- Alastair Leithead (born 1972), British journalist
- J. Edward Leithead, American writer
