= Con Steffanson =

Con Steffanson is the house name used by:

- Ron Goulart
- Bruce Cassiday
