= Masked Rider (disambiguation) =

The Masked Rider is the primary mascot of Texas Tech University.

Masked Rider or The Masked Rider may also refer to:

== Fictional characters ==
- The Masked Rider, from the 1912 novel Riders of the Purple Sage by Zane Grey and the 1918 film adaptation
- Masked Rider, from the 1928 American film The Sunset Legion
- Masked Rider, from the 2009 French-British-Czech film Solomon Kane
- Masked Rider, from Standard Comics

== Film and television ==
- The Masked Rider (1916 film), an American film directed by Fred J. Balshofer
- The Masked Rider (1919 film), an American film featuring Boris Karloff
- The Masked Rider (1941 film), an American Western film directed by Ford Beebe
- Kamen Rider or Masked Rider, a 1971–1983 Japanese television series
- Masked Rider (TV series), a 1995–1996 American series adapted from the 1988–1989 Japanese series Kamen Rider Black RX
- "The Masked Rider" (The Lone Ranger), a 1949 television episode

== Literature ==
- The Masked Rider: Cycling in West Africa, a 1996 book by Neil Peart
- Masked Rider, a 1953 Harlequin Romance novel by Will Garth

== Video games ==
- The Masked Rider: Kamen Rider ZO, a 1994 video game

== See also ==
- The Invincible Masked Rider, a 1963 Italian-French adventure film
- Hercules and the Masked Rider, a 1963 Italian peplum film
