= Beyond the Rockies =

Beyond the Rockies may refer to:

- Beyond the Rockies (1932 film), an American Pre-Code Western film
- Beyond the Rockies (1926 film), an American silent Western film
