= Tramp, Tramp, Tramp (1942 film) =

1942 film

- Directed by: Charles Barton
- Written by: Hal Braham; Ned Dandy; Shannon Day; Marian Grant; Harry Sauber
- Produced by: Wallace MacDonald
- Starring: Jackie Gleason; Jack Durant; Florence Rice
- Cinematography: John Stumar
- Edited by: William A. Lyon
- Production company: Columbia Pictures
- Distributed by: Columbia Pictures
- Release date: April 2, 1942
- Running time: 68 minutes
- Country: United States
- Language: English

Tramp, Tramp, Tramp is a 1942 American comedy film directed by Charles Barton and starring Jackie Gleason, Jack Durant and Florence Rice. The film's sets were designed by the studio's regular art director Lionel Banks. The production was an attempt to replicate the success of rival studio Universal's hit film Buck Privates, starring Abbott and Costello.

== Plot ==
Two small town barbers attempt to enlist in the Army following America's entry into World War II. However they are both rejected military unfit. Inspired by a sense of patriotism they form their own "home defense" unit, recruiting other men who have been rejected by the draft board.

== Cast ==
- Jackie Gleason as Hank
- Jack Durant as Jed
- Florence Rice as Pam Martin
- Bruce Bennett as Tommy Lydel
- Hallene Hill as Granny
- Billy Curtis as Midget
- Mabel Todd as Vivian
- Forrest Tucker as Blond Bomber
- James Seay as Biggie Waldron
- John Tyrrell as Lefty
- John Harmon as Mousey
- Eddie Foster as Blackie
- Al Hill as Tim
- John Dilson as Judge Smith
- Borrah Minevitch and His Harmonica Rascals as Themselves
- Eddie Kane as Doctor
- Lloyd Bridges as Guard
- Heinie Conklin as Soldier
- Herbert Rawlinson as Ex-Soldier Commander
- William Gould as Colonel

== Bibliography ==
- Erickson, Hal . Military Comedy Films: A Critical Survey and Filmography of Hollywood Releases Since 1918. McFarland, 2012.
