= Joy House (film) =

- US film poster
- Directed by: René Clément
- Screenplay by: René Clément; Pascal Jardin; Charles Williams
- Based on: Joy House by Day Keene
- Produced by: Jacques Bar
- Starring: Alain Delon; Jane Fonda; Lola Albright
- Cinematography: Henri Decaë
- Edited by: Fedora Zincone
- Music by: Lalo Schifrin
- Production companies: Cité Films; Compagnie Internationale de Productions Cinématographiques
- Distributed by: Metro-Goldwyn-Mayer
- Release date: June 12, 1964
- Running time: 97 minutes
- Country: France
- Languages: French; English
- Box office: 1,414,966 admissions (France)

Joy House (French title: Les félins / UK title: The Love Cage) is a 1964 French mystery–thriller film starring Jane Fonda, Alain Delon and Lola Albright. It is based on the 1954 novel of the same name by Day Keene.

The film was directed by René Clément, his second for MGM.

== Plot ==
In Monte Carlo, Marc, a handsome card sharp, escapes American gangsters who have been ordered to kill him because he had an affair with the boss's wife. Marc hides in a mission for the poor where Barbara, a wealthy widow, finds him and hires him as her chauffeur.

At Barbara's chateau, her niece Melinda becomes attracted to Marc, and Marc discovers that Barbara is hiding her lover Vincent in the secret rooms and passageways of the chateau. Vincent is a bank robber sought by the police for murdering Barbara's husband. He and Barbara plan to murder Marc so that Vincent may use Marc's passport to escape to South America. Marc and Barbara begin an affair but are discovered by Vincent, who then kills Barbara but is also killed by the American gangsters who mistake him for Marc.

Marc and Melinda plan to dispose of the two bodies, but when Melinda learns that Marc is planning to leave without her, she tricks the police into believing that Marc is guilty and forces him to hide in the chateau's secret rooms. He is her prisoner, just as Vincent had been her aunt's.

== Cast ==
- Jane Fonda as Melinda
- Alain Delon as Marc
- Lola Albright as Barbara
- Sorrell Booke as Harry
- Carl Studer as Loftus
- André Oumansky as Vincent
- Arthur Howard as Father Nielson
- Georges Douking as Tramp
- Del Negro as Mick

== Production ==
The film was based on a Day Keene novel published in 1954. The New York Times called the book "more conventional than usual" but said the story was "... well constructed and sharply twisted in the James M. Cain manner."

Film rights were bought by MGM and René Clément was hired to direct. He had previously directed MGM's The Day and the Hour, another film featuring both American and French actors.

MGM signed Alain Delon to a five-picture deal following the studio's successful collaboration with him on 1963's Any Number Can Win.

In March 1963, Natalie Wood was announced for the role of Melinda, but she soon withdrew and was replaced by Jane Fonda.

Filming began in August 1963. The film was partly shot in the historic Villa Torre Clementina.

Joy House was Fonda's first film in France. Of the shoot she said, "there was chaos, rain and script changes, I fought sixty battles and won them all." She filmed her part speaking English and was later dubbed into French. She later recalled that Clément directed the film without a script:

I didn't speak very good French then, and I never understood much of what was going on. The only people who really dug that movie, for some reason, were junkies. They used to come up to me and give me a big wink. But I'm awfully glad I did it because it got me into France and I met [later husband Roger] Vadim.

Fonda married Vadim in 1965 and lived in France for several years. Fonda later alleged that Clément, 24 years her elder, tried to persuade her to sleep with him in preparation for a love scene in the film.

Lalo Schifrin won the 1965 Grammy Award for Best Original Jazz Composition for the theme tune "The Cat".

== Reception ==
The Los Angeles Times called the film "an oddball thriller."
