= Beyond the Farthest Star (Star Trek: The Animated Series) =

- Star Trek: The Animated Series episode
- Episode no.: Season 1 Episode 1
- Directed by: Hal Sutherland
- Written by: Samuel A. Peeples
- Production code: 22004
- Original air date: September 8, 1973

Episode chronology
← Previous "Turnabout Intruder"	Next → "Yesteryear"

"Beyond the Farthest Star" is the pilot episode and series premiere of the animated American science fiction television series Star Trek: The Animated Series. This series premiere episode first aired in the NBC Saturday morning lineup at 10:30 a.m. on September 8, 1973, seven years to the day after the series premiere of the live-action series that started the franchise. It was written by American author and scriptwriter Samuel A. Peeples who had also written the Original Series second pilot "Where No Man Has Gone Before". (Note: This story was expanded into a novelette by science-fiction author Alan Dean Foster as part of the collection, Star Trek Log One (1974) (ISBN 0-345-24014-6).)

In this episode, the Enterprise crew must contend with a malevolent non-corporeal alien entity that has taken control of the ship and tries to force them to help it escape the massive gravity well of a dead star.

== Plot ==
While exploring on the outermost rim of the galaxy, the Federation starship Enterprise abruptly encounters strong hypergravitational effects and is pulled into the orbit of a dead star. The crew discovers that a massive damaged 300,000,000-year-old alien pod ship, emitting radio signals, is trapped along with them.

Captain Kirk beams aboard the huge starship with a boarding party that includes First Officer Spock, Chief Medical Officer Dr. McCoy and Chief Engineer Scott, where they learn it was once home to an insectoid race. They also learn from a prerecorded message that the ship became almost completely controlled by a malevolent entity seeking to escape the dead sun and travel to other worlds. The ship's crew created an isolated chamber the entity did not control. From there they recorded the message, then had their ship self-destruct rather than let it be used by the entity. The entity begins to pierce into the isolated chamber where the Enterprise party is and beams back with them.

Infiltrating the workings of the ship, it disables the self-destruct mechanism, but Spock has placed the navigation console inside a static shield, so it cannot steer the ship. Instead, it uses the ship's systems to threaten the crew's lives and thereby coerce Kirk to navigate the ship according to its orders.

Kirk flies the Enterprise toward the dead star in what appears to be a suicide run, but in actuality is a slingshot maneuver for escaping its massive gravity. The entity believes the ship will crash and be destroyed and so flees, with the Enterprise successfully escaping both it and the dead star.

== Broadcast and streaming ==
This episode was first broadcast on September 8, 1973 on NBC. However, in the Los Angeles area, "Yesteryear" was played instead, because it had too much air time for voice actor George Takei as Sulu, who was running for a public office and if it was played they would have to give equal airtime to the other candidates. George Takei was running for 10th District Councilman seat for the City of Los Angeles, which triggered the FCC rules about airtime for political candidates.

On the launch of Paramount+ streaming service, on March 4, 2021, a free Star Trek marathon was presented, featuring the pilots of the various Star Trek television series, including "Beyond the Farthest Star". The marathon started at 7 am PT/10 am ET and was Live streamed on the YouTube internet video platform on that day.

== Reception ==
The episode received outstanding reviews upon its initial broadcast, with reviewers praising the intelligent writing, imagination, production, and adherence to the tone of the live action series. In 2017 this episode was noted as featuring scary Star Trek content. Also in 2017, GameSpot ranked this as the 6th best pilot episode of a Star Trek series, commenting, "The original voice cast is there, and they do the best they can, but the dialogue and animation make it a hard task to sit through."

In 2020, Gizmodo Australia ranked "Beyond the Farthest Star" one of the "must watch" episodes of the animated series.

== See also ==
- Booby Trap - a Next Generation episode where the heroes' ship is trapped near an ancient dead ship (which is explored by an Enterprise captain) which provides clues about their situation.
