= Samuel A. Peeples =

American western novelist and screenwriter

- Born: Samuel Anthony Peeples; September 22, 1917
- Died: August 27, 1997 (aged 79)
- Writing career
- Pen name: Brad Ward

Samuel Anthony Peeples (September 22, 1917 – August 27, 1997) was an American writer. He published several novels in the Western genre, often under the pen name Brad Ward, before moving into American series television after being given a script assignment by Frank Gruber. In addition to writing Western television scripts, he created several Western series, notably Lancer (1968), Frontier Circus (1961), The Tall Man (1961), and co-created the series Custer (1967).

Peeples was a literary science fiction enthusiast who also occasionally wrote science fiction for television, starting by providing advice and reference material to friend and colleague Gene Roddenberry as the latter created what became the original Star Trek series. Peeples was one of three writers selected to write a proposed second pilot for the series, and his script, "Where No Man Has Gone Before" (1965), was filmed and sold the series. He contributed the first aired episode of the animated Star Trek series, "Beyond the Farthest Star" (1973). He also worked with Roddenberry on the script for the 1977 TV movie (and unsuccessful series pilot) Spectre. Peeples wrote an unused alternative script, Worlds That Never Were, for the second Star Trek motion picture. The name of one character from his draft, Doctor Savik, would eventually get reused for the character Lieutenant Saavik.

Peeples wrote a number of episodes for Filmation's live action Space Academy and Jason of Star Command series and wrote the script for their animated TV movie and seven first-season episodes of the Flash Gordon series that resulted from it.

Peeples died of cancer on August 27, 1997, at age 79, just one month short of his eightieth birthday.

== Novels ==
- The Dream Ends in Fury (1949) (paperback title: Outlaw Vengeance)
- The Hanging Hills (as Brad Ward) (1952)
- Johnny Sundance (as Brad Ward) (1953)
- The Marshal Of Medicine Bend (as Brad Ward) (1954)
- The Baron of Boot Hill (as Brad Ward) (1954)
- The Lobo Horseman (1955) a.k.a. (The Lobo Horseman: Was he the last threat to Dynamite Valley?)
- The Call of the Gun (1955)
- The Man from Andersonville (1956) (as Brad Ward)
- Terror at Tres Alamos (1956)
- Doc Colt (1957)
- Frontier Street (as Brad Ward) (1958)
- The Man Who Died Twice (1976)
- Why I Am A Gangster (1978)

== Films ==
- Advance to the Rear (with William Bowers) 1967
- Final Chapter: Walking Tall (with Howard B. Kreitzek) 1977

== Television series, as creator ==
- The Tall Man 1960
- Custer 1967
- Lancer 1968, and wrote the pilot "High Riders"

== Television scripts ==
- Tales of Wells Fargo
  - “The Most Dangerous Man Alive” 1958
- Wanted: Dead or Alive 1958
  - "The Bounty"
  - "Rawhide Breed"
  - "Bounty for a Bride"
- The Rifleman 1958
  - "The Angry Gun
- Bonanza 1959
  - "The Saddle Stiff"
- Have Gun – Will Travel
  - "Fight at Adobe Wells" 1960
- Overland Trail 1960
- Dick Powell's Zane Grey Theatre 1958
  - "Medal of Valor" 1958
  - "Daughter of the Sioux"
  - "First Stage to Denver"
  - "High Bridge"
  - "The Most Dangerous Gentleman"
  - "Vigilantes of Montana"
  - "Westbound Stage"
- Burke's Law 1963
- The Rogues 1964
  - "Our Men in Marawat"
- A Man Called Shenandoah 1965
- The Legend of Jesse James 1965
- Star Trek 1966
  - "Where No Man Has Gone Before"
- Bonanza 1972
  - "The Saddle Stiff"
- Star Trek 1973
  - "Beyond the Farthest Star"
- Jason of Star Command 1978
  - season 1, episodes 1 to 6

== TV movies ==
- Spectre (with Gene Roddenberry) 1977
- A Real American Hero 1978
- Flash Gordon: The Greatest Adventure of All 1982

== See also ==
- List of Ace Titles in first DGS series
