= Yesteryear (Star Trek: The Animated Series) =

- Star Trek: The Animated Series episode
- Episode no.: Season 1 Episode 2
- Directed by: Hal Sutherland
- Written by: D. C. Fontana
- Production code: 22003
- Original air date: September 15, 1973

Guest appearances
- Mark Lenard - Sarek; Billy Simpson - Young Spock; Keith Sutherland - Young Sepek

Episode chronology
← Previous "Beyond the Farthest Star"	Next → "One of Our Planets Is Missing"

"Yesteryear" is the second episode of the first season of the animated American science fiction television series Star Trek: The Animated Series. It first aired in the NBC Saturday morning lineup on September 15, 1973, and was written by veteran Star Trek writer D. C. Fontana. (Note: This story was expanded into a novelette by science-fiction author Alan Dean Foster as part of the collection, Star Trek Log One (1974) (ISBN 0-345-24014-6).) Widely regarded as one of the best episodes of the series, it was nominated for a Daytime Emmy Award. "Yesteryear" guest-starred Mark Lenard in the role of Spock's father, Sarek.

In this episode, Enterprise First Officer Spock must travel in time to his childhood and keep his younger self from dying and being replaced by an Andorian on his ship.

== Plot ==
Captain Kirk and Spock return from a time-traveling research project they have been conducting with the use of the Guardian of Forever and Starfleet historians. When they emerge from the portal, no one on board the Federation starship Enterprise recognizes Spock. The ship's first officer is instead an Andorian, Commander Thelin.

In the new timeline, history has recorded that Spock died at age seven undergoing the Kahs-wan ordeal on Vulcan. However, Spock remembers that when he took the Kahs-wan, his life was saved by Selek—an adult relative—when a desert creature with poisonous claws called a le-matya attacked them. Kirk hypothesizes that Selek was actually a time-traveling Spock. While Kirk and Spock were in the portal, the Guardian and historians ran a scan of recent Vulcan history. The pair realize that as they were observing the birth of Orion at the time, Spock could not have been in two places at once to save himself as a child. Spock must go back through the time gate, and save the life of the child he was. Thelin is supportive of Spock's efforts despite their consequences on his own existence.

Spock assumes the identity of Selek, a distant cousin of Sarek, and is welcomed into the home of Sarek and Amanda Grayson. (Note: Spock's mother, Amanda Grayson, portrayed live on screen by Jane Wyatt, is voiced here by Majel Barrett.) "Selek" journeys into the desert to find his younger self, and saves the boy. However, I-Chaya—Spock's pet sehlat—is gravely wounded. The younger Spock runs to fetch a Healer. The Healer tends to I-Chaya and informs Selek and Spock that it is too late for an antidote; he can only prolong I-Chaya's life, during which he will be in pain from the poison, or euthanize him. Young Spock chooses the latter. By making this choice, Spock has thus chosen the Vulcan way of life—logic and emotional control—and his elder self, successful in repairing history, returns to the restored present day, but not before teaching his younger self how to perform the Vulcan nerve pinch in order to deal with some school bullies.

== Production ==
The network, NBC, expressed concern about the episode's depiction of a pet being euthanized. However, Star Trek creator Gene Roddenberry approved of writer D. C. Fontana's handling of the issue, and since NBC had given Roddenberry full creative control of the series, they had little choice but to broadcast the episode as it was. The Animated Series' co-producer Lou Scheimer later said "Yesteryear" was "probably my favorite episode. It sent a message to kids to be positive in the face of death."

== Broadcast ==
Los Angeles-area stations aired this episode as the series premiere, instead of "Beyond the Farthest Star", to avoid violating the United States' FCC's equal-time rule, because one of the voice actors in "Beyond the Farthest Star", George Takei, was running for public office at the time.

== References in other media ==
- Several concepts that first appeared in The Animated Series episode "Yesteryear", including the Forge and the city of ShiKahr, were later included in the Enterprise three-part story that started with "The Forge".
- In the 2009 film Star Trek, young Spock is bullied by three fellow Vulcan students in the same manner as is seen happening in this episode.

== Reception ==
"Yesteryear" was nominated for a Daytime Emmy Award in the category Outstanding Entertainment Children's Series.

The 2008 book Star Trek 101: A Practical Guide to Who, What, Where, and Why recognized writer D.C. Fontana's contributions to the Vulcan story, including her writing on "Journey to Babel" which further established the species. They also note that despite being planned for presentation as a children's cartoon, it has a sci-fi plot and emotional impact that ranks among the best of live-action Star Trek episodes.

"Yesteryear" was noted as one of the most celebrated episodes of the animated series, while also having some influence on later productions, and the fictional Vulcan city of ShiKahr which was featured in Star Trek: Enterprise.

In 2013, The Guardian recommended this episode as one of six Star Trek episodes, out of all episodes of the franchise up to that time. They were impressed with the plot for what was basically a Saturday morning children's cartoon, remarking "Spock finds out that the timeline has been changed and he died as a child on Vulcan. He must go back in time to become the man who saved the younger version of himself."

In 2016, The Hollywood Reporter rated "Yesteryear" the 59th best Star Trek episode.

In 2016, SyFy ranked "Yesteryear" as the 15th best time travel plot in Star Trek.

In 2018, a Star Trek binge-watching guide by Den of Geek, recommended this episode as part of the "foundations of Star Trek" group.

In 2018, CBR ranked this episode the fourth best time-travel episode of all Star Trek.

In 2019, Noel Murray at The Verge called this an "episode to watch" with Star Trek: Discovery. Murray recognized Dorothy C. Fontana who wrote ten episodes of the original Star Trek, and recommended "Yesteryear" for both veteran and rookie Star Trek watchers. He noted how the cartoon medium allowed the depictions of aliens and expressions that would be difficult to replicate in a live-action show. Murray also praised Gene Roddenberry for maintaining a high quality in Star Trek merchandise such as comic books, and noted this episode for exploring the origins of the character Spock.

In 2019, Nerdist ranked this the 9th best time travel-themed episode of the Star Trek franchise (including later spin-offs).

== See also ==
- "Journey to Babel" - an Original Series episode where Spock's parents, Sarek and Amanda, first appeared.
