= List of Harlequin Romance novels released in 1953 =

This is a list of Harlequin Romance novels released in 1953. (Main index: List of Harlequin Romance novels)

== Releases ==
Number	Title	Author	Date	Citations
# 204	Gun Hawk	Leslie Ernenwein	1953	
# 205	The Black Flame	Stanley G. Weinbaum	1953	
# 206	You Never Know With Women	James Hadley Chase	1953	
# 207	Three Ships West	Harry Symons	1953	
# 208	Pillar Of Fire	George Borodin	1953	
# 209	The Rock Cried Out	Edward Stanley	1953	
# 210	McSorley's Wonderful Saloon	Joseph Mitchell	1953	
# 211	The Cautious Amorist	Norman Lindsay	1953	
# 212	Shooting Valley	Lynn Westland	1953	
# 213	The Royal Story	Richard J. Doyle	1953	
# 214	Paprika	Erich Von Stroheim	1953 (Note: Reprinted)	
# 215	Turn Back The River	W.G. Hardy	1953	
# 216	No Mean City (non-romance)	Alexander McArthur and H. Kingsley Long	1953	
# 217	The Sea Hawk	Rafael Sabatini	1953	
# 218	The Golden Amazon	John Russell Fearn	1953	
# 219	Girls In White	Rona Randall	1953	
# 220	Masked Rider	Will Garth	1953	
# 221	The Great Impersonation	E. Phillips Oppenheim	1953	
# 222	Mad Mike	George Goodchild	1953	
# 223	The Wages Of Virtue	P.C. Wren	1953	
# 224	Lady Hobo	Beth Brown	1953	
# 225	Sir Rusty Sword	Phillip Lindsay	1953	
# 226	The Owlhoot Trail	Buck Billings	1953	
# 227	We Too Can Die	Paul Le Butt	1953	
# 228	Drums Of Dambala	H. Bedford Jones	1953	
# 229	Framed In Guilt	Day Keene	1953	
# 230	Women Spies	Kurt Singer	1953	
# 231	Legionnaire	John Robb	1953	
# 232	Malay Gold	H. Bedford Jones	1953	
# 233	Die With Me Lady	Ronald Cocking	1953	
# 234	Rebound	Dick Diespecker	1953	
# 235	General Duty Nurse	Lucy Agnes Hancock	1953	
# 236	Gunthrower	William Hopson	1953	
# 237	Island Of Escape	Alexander Key	1953	
# 238	The Lost World (non-romance)	Sir Arthur Conan Doyle	1953	
# 239	Mission Of Revenge	Edison Marshall	1953	
# 240	Violent Night	Whit Harrison	1953	
# 241	Son Of The Gods	Rex Beach	1953	
# 242	The Murder On The Links (non-romance)	Agatha Christie	1953	
# 243	School For Love	Oliver Anderson	1953	
# 244	Hostage	Archie Joscelyn	1953	
# 245	The Soft Touch	James Hadley Chase	1953	
# 246	The Law's Outlaw	Arnold Smith	1953	
# 247	Dark Surgery	Ben Ames Williams	1953	
# 248	Legion Of The Lawless	Lynn Westland	1953	
# 249	Come Blonde, Came Murder	Peter George	1953	
# 250	The Man In The Middle	Ferguson Findley	1953	
# 251	Doctor In Buckskin	T.D. Allen	1953	
# 252	Legion Of Dishonor	Ivan Lebedeff	1953	
# 253	Wake Up To Murder	Day Keene	1953	
# 254	Mesquite Johnny	Barry Cord	1953	
# 255	Lady - Here's Your Wreath	Raymond Marshall	1953	
# 256	No Wings On A Cop	Cleve F. Adams	1953	
# 257	One Man Front	George Murdock Rennie	1953	
# 258	World Behind Bars	Louis Berg, M.D.	1953	
# 259	Silver City	Bradford Scott	1953	
# 260	The Outlaw Trail	Johnson McCulley	1953	
# 261	Light In The Wilderness	E. B. Osler	1953	
# 262	The Body On Mount Royal	David Montrose	1953	
# 263	Texas Showdown	Archie Joscelyn	1953	
# 264	Community Nurse	Lucy Agnes Hancock	1953	
