= Hal Braham =

American novelist (1911–1994)

Hal Braham (1911–1994) was an American writer primarily known for his work in crime fiction and western fiction. He has a film credit for the story in the 1942 Jackie Gleason movie Tramp, Tramp, Tramp. His published work was mostly released under the pseudonym "Mel Colton". Another pseudonym he used was "Merrill Trask", when he published his western short-stories in "True" and "Look" Magazines.

== Career ==
As Mel Colton, Braham wrote for Black Mask magazine. In the 1950s, four of his novels were republished by Ace Books as a part of their doubles series from 1952 to 1965. Titles from this series include: The Big Fix (1952), Never Kill a Cop (1953), Double Take (1953) and Point of No Escape (1955).

== The Fictioneers ==
Braham was also a member of the Fictioneers, a group of writers based in Los Angeles who specialized in mystery and western novels. The authors would meet monthly to discuss their work over dinner and drinks. As a member of this group, he was a dedicatee of science fiction writer Richard Matheson's Journal of the Gun Years (1991), along with fellow Fictioneer writers such as William Campbell Gault, William R. Cox, Henry Kuttner, Les Savage Jr., Joe Brennan, Malden Grange Bishop, Chick Coombs, Dean Owens, Bill Fay, Willard Temple, Frank Bonham, Todhunter Ballard and Wilbur S. Peacock.

== Death ==
Braham died in 1994, in California, the day after his 83rd birthday.

== Books ==
- Call Me Deadly (Graphic, 1957)
- Murder in Brief (Bouregy, 1956) (as Merrill Trask)
- Point of No Escape (Ace, 1955) (as Mel Colton)
- Never Kill A Cop (Ace, 1953) (as Mel Colton)
- Double Take (Ace, 1953) (as Mel Colton)
- The Big Woman (Rainbow, 1953) (as Mel Colton)
- The Big Fix (Ace, 1952) (as Mel Colton)
- Camp Nuts (Columbia, 1941) (with Shannon Day and Marian Grant)

== Film and theatre ==
- Tramp, Tramp, Tramp (1942)
- Loveable Scamp: A Play in 27 Scenes (1934)
