= Leslie Edgley =

American novelist (1912–2002)

- Born: Leslie John Edgley; October 14, 1912; London, England, U.K.
- Died: March 12, 2002 (aged 89)
- Occupations: Novelist, radio dramatist, screenwriter
- Spouse: Mary Anna Gustaitis
- Children: 3
- Writing career
- Pen name: Robert Bloomfield, Michael Gillian, Brook Hastings (Note: "Brook Hastings" is the pseudonym employed for books authored jointly by Edgley and his wife, the former Mary Anna Gustaitis.)
- Genre: Mystery
- Notable work: Perry Mason

Leslie John Edgley (October 14, 1912 – August 9, 2002) was an English-born American mystery fiction writer, radio dramatist screenwriter and playwright. Among the works for which he became known are the scripts for many episodes of Perry Mason, written as "Robert Bloomfield".

== Early life and career ==
Edgley was born in London in 1912, but emigrated with his parents to Canada in 1918; four years later, they came to the United States, finally putting down roots in East Chicago, Indiana. Edgley spent his formative years in the Marktown district, graduating from Washington High School in 1930. In 1936, one year after marrying East Chicago native Mary Anna Gustaitis; Edgley attained United States citizenship. In 1944, the couple relocated to California.

Beginning his writing career in the 1940s, Edgley published work under his own name, but also started using the name "Robert Bloomfield" as a pen name on some of his work as early as 1947.

In 1952, Edgley was named as a former member of the Communist Party USA by Roy Huggins, in testimony before the House Un-American Activities Committee. From 1956 forward, in order to work around being on the Hollywood blacklist, all of Edgley's television work was credited to his already established alias of Robert Bloomfield.

As Robert Bloomfield, Edgley had a prolific TV writing career between 1956 and 1968, writing episodes of Lassie, Climax!, Perry Mason, Bonanza, Rawhide, The Wild Wild West, and many other US TV series.

== Works ==
=== as Leslie Edgley ===
- No Birds Sing, New York, Farrar & Rinehart, 1940, 328 pp.
- Fear No More, New York, Simon and Schuster, 1946, 202 pp.
  - Reprinted by Ace, 1953, bound dos-à-dos with Hal Braham (as Mel Colton), Never Kill A Cop
- False Face, New York, Simon and Schuster, 1946, 202 pp.
- The Angry Heart, Garden City, N.Y., Published for the Crime Club by Doubleday, 1947, 190 pp.
  - Reprinted as Tracked Down by Ace, 1954, bound tête-bêche with Martin L. Weiss, Death Hitches A Ride
- The Judas Goat, Garden City, N.Y., Published for the Crime Club by Doubleday, 1952, 190 pp.
  - Reprinted by Ace, 1953, bound tête-bêche with Theodore S. Drachman, Cry Plague! as the first Ace Double
- The Runaway Pigeon, Garden City, N.Y., Published for the Crime Club by Doubleday, 1953, 188 pp.
  - Also published as One Blonde Died, Lawrence E. Pivak, N.Y., 1953, Bestseller Mystery B171
  - Published in UK as Diamonds Spell Death, Arthur Barker, 1954, Museum Street Thriller series
- A Dirty Business, New York, G.P. Putnam's Sons, 1969, 182 pp.

=== as Robert Bloomfield ===
- Shadow of Guilt, New York, Doubleday, 1947
- From This Day Forward, New York, Doubleday, 1952
- Lust for Vengeance, New York, Doubleday, 1952, 189 pp.
- Russian Roulette, New York, Harcourt, 1955
- When Strangers Meet, New York, Doubleday, 1956
- Kill With Kindness, New York, Doubleday, 1962

=== as Michael Gillian ===
- Warrant for a Wanton, New York, Mill-William Morrow & Company, 1952, 246 pp.

=== with Mary Edgley (as Brook Hastings) ===
- The Demon Within, New York, Doubleday, 1953
