= Beyond the Rockies (1926 film) =

1926 film

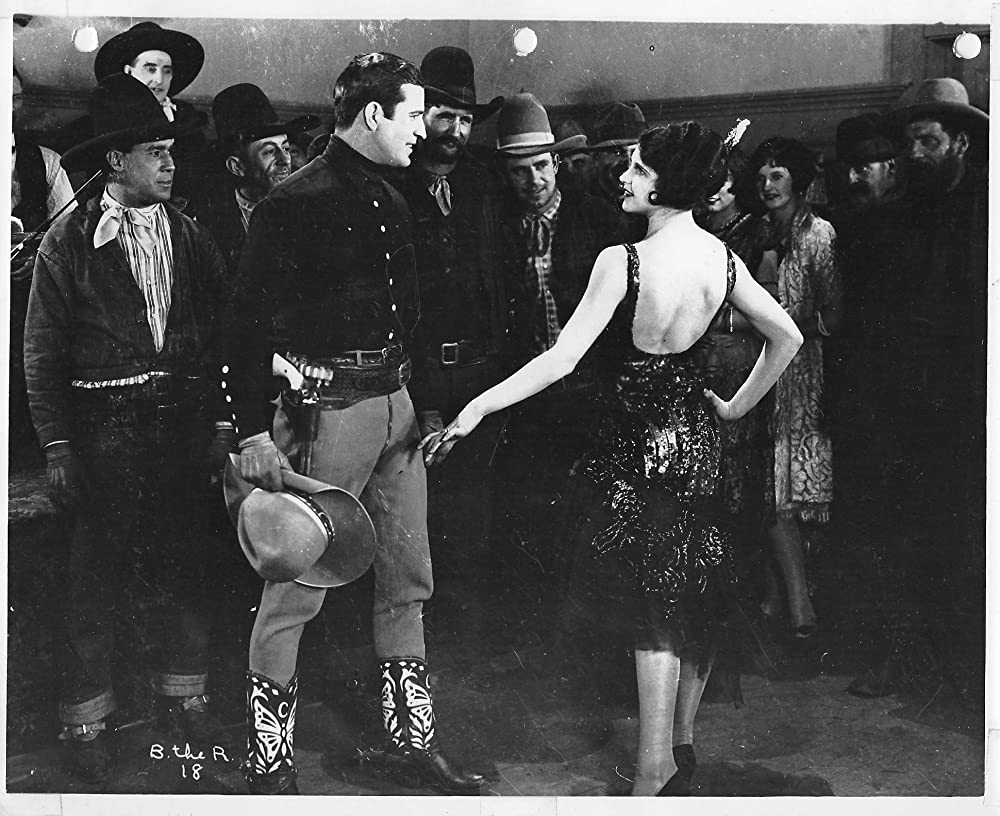
- Directed by: Jack Nelson
- Story by: J. Edward Leithead
- Produced by: Jesse J. Goldburg
- Starring: Bob Custer; Eugenia Gilbert; David Dunbar
- Production company: Robertson-Cole Pictures Corporation
- Distributed by: Film Booking Offices of America
- Release date: February 21, 1926
- Running time: 53 minutes
- Country: United States
- Language: Silent (English intertitles)

Beyond the Rockies is a 1926 American silent Western film directed by Jack Nelson and starring Bob Custer, Eugenia Gilbert, and David Dunbar. The film was based on a story by J. Edward Leithead.

== Plot ==
Con Benteen is an undercover agent for the Cattlemen's Protective Association. He heads into a lawless town to investigate a gang of cattle rustlers who are known as "the Cloaked Riders". As part of his cover, Benteen joins the Riders to get close to the leader Cottle. Benteen's cover is blown and he identified as an undercover agent. The gang restrains Benteen and leaves him tied up in a shack containing explosives. He escapes and captures the rustlers. In the process, he wins the love of a dancehall girl named Flossie.

== Cast ==
- Bob Custer as Con Benteen
- Eugenia Gilbert as Flossie
- David Dunbar as Cottle
- Bruce Gordon as Monte Lorin
- Milton Ross as Tex Marcy
- Eddie Harris as Sartwell
- Fox O'Callahan as Dunc James
- Roy Laidlaw as Dave Heep
- Max Asher as Mayor Smithson

== Reception ==
The Western Movies guide describes Beyond the Rockies as a "well made and fast moving production, starring a bit too gung-ho Tom Keene."

== Preservation ==
With no holdings located in archives, Beyond the Rockies is considered a lost film.
