= Jack Karney =

Australian rules footballer

Personal information
- Full name: John Karney
- Born: 4 February 1895; Bowden, South Australia
- Died: 1986 (aged 90–91)
- Positions: Centre, rover

Playing career^{1}
Years	Club	Games (Goals)
1919–1928	West Torrens	128 (70)
- ^{1} Playing statistics correct to the end of 1928.

John "Jack" Karney (4 February 1895 – 1986) was an Australian rules footballer who played with West Torrens in the South Australian Football League (SAFL).

Karney could play as either a centreman or rover and first appeared for West Torrens in 1919. He was their best and fairest winner in 1920 and 1921. In 1921 he performed well in the Magarey Medal count, finishing equal first but missing out after the umpires conferred to decide on just one winner. Karney however was awarded a retrospective Medal in 1998. Over his career he represented South Australia at interstate football on eight occasions, the first in his debut season. He was a member of West Torrens' inaugural premiership side in 1924; he was as vice-captain and coach. He retired in 1928 with a total of 128 games.
