= Kate Clugston =

American dramatist

Katharine "Kate" Thatcher Clugston (1892 in Whitley County, Indiana – 1985 in Chebeague Island, Maine) was a playwright, poet, and English teacher.

After graduating from high school in Indiana, Kate Clugston went to Wells College, where she received her bachelor's degree in 1914. She then studied at Radcliffe College and at the Yale School of Drama under George Pierce Baker. Her play Finished was produced at New Haven to excellent reviews but failed, after eight performances, in New York under the title These Days. In November 1928 her play These Days, which was the Broadway debut of Katharine Hepburn in a supporting role, failed in New York but eventually served as part of the basis of the screenplay for the 1934 film Finishing School. In the academic year 1931–1932 she studied abroad with the support of a Guggenheim Fellowship. Her play The Head of the Family was adapted for the 1934 film The Last Gentleman starring George Arliss and Charlotte Henry. Clugston was the head of the play bureau in the Federal Theatre Project and wrote the report Reorganization of the Play Bureau in 1936. She established Wells College's department of Public Relations and served as its director from 1944 to 1947. She taught English until her retirement to her home on Chebeague Island, Maine.

As a memorial tribute, Wells College established the Kate Clugston Class of 1914 Prize in Theatre.
