= Milton K. Ozaki =

American writer

- Born: June 14, 1913; Racine, Wisconsin
- Died: November 7, 1989 (aged 76); Reno, Nevada
- Occupation: Author
- Writing career
- Pen name: Robert O. Saber

Milton K. Ozaki (June 14, 1913 – November 7, 1989) was an American writer.

== Life ==
Ozaki was born in Racine, Wisconsin to a Japanese father (Jingaro Ozaki, who later changed his name to Frank) and an American mother, Augusta Rathbun. He lost a leg as a young child. In addition to his work as a writer and journalist, he operated a beauty parlor (the Monsieur Meltoine beauty salon, in the Gold Coast section of Chicago). Ozaki and his wife Dolores B. Ozaki lived at 6314 Fifth Avenue in Kenosha, Wisconsin. In the 1970s, he operated phony mail-order colleges, including the Colorado State Christian College and Hamilton State University, and he was also involved in a company marketing a device fraudulently claimed to increase gas mileage. He died in Reno, Nevada.

== Writing ==
Ozaki was the author of approximately two dozen popular mid-20th century detective novels under both his given name and the pseudonym Robert O. Saber, and was one of the first American mystery writers of Japanese descent. His novels are set in the fictional, mid-sized southeastern-Wisconsin city of Stillwell, Wisconsin, which is actually a barely disguised Kenosha.

== Novels ==
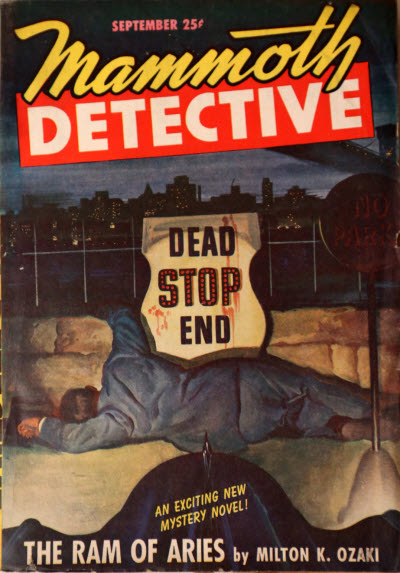
Ozaki's novel "The Ram of Aries" was the cover story for the final issue of Mammoth Detective in 1947

- The Cuckoo Clock (1946) – Also published under the title "Too Many Women" (1947)
- A Fiend in Need (1947)
- The Ram of Aries (1947)
- The Black Dark Murders (1949) – Also published under the title "Out Of The Dark" (1954)
- The Affair of the Frigid Blonde (1950) – Also published under the title "The Deadly Blonde" (1953)
- The Deadly Lover (1951)
- The Scented Flesh (1951)
- The Dummy Murder Case (1951)
- The Dove (1951) – Also published under the title "Chicago Woman" (1953)
- No Way Out (1952) – Also published under the title "Borrowed Time" (1955)
- Murder Doll (1952)
- The Deadly Pickup (1953)
- Murder Honeymoon (1953)
- City of Sin (1952)
- Dressed to Kill (1954)
- Too Young to Die (1954)
- Shake Hands With The Devil (1954)
- Maid For Murder (1955)
- A Dame Called Murder (1955)
- Marked For Murder (1955)
- Model for Murder (1955)
- Sucker Bait (1955)
- Never Say Die (1956)
- A Time For Murder (1956)
- Case of the Deadly Kiss (1957)
- The Case of the Cop's Wife (1958)
- Wake Up and Scream (1959)
- Inquest (1960)
- Too Cute To Kill (Publish date unknown)

== Games ==
Milton K. Ozaki also designed a dice game, Murder Dice, which was similar to Yahtzee and was based on the events in a murder trial.
