= J. Edward Leithead =

American novelist

J. Edward Leithead (died 1970) was an American writer.

== Career ==
One of his magazine stories was adapted into the 1926 silent film Beyond the Rockies.

== Personal life ==
Leithead married his wife Edith in 1926, having met her in West Philadelphia. Their son was named William Cody Leithead after the popular Wild West figure Buffalo Bill.

Outside of the writing industry, Leithead worked as a proofreader for an insurance company. He died in 1970 at the age of 75.
