= Harry Whittington (author) =

American novelist

Harry Whittington (February 4, 1915 – June 11, 1989) was an American mystery novelist and one of the pioneers of the paperback novel. Born in Ocala, Florida, he worked in government jobs before becoming a writer. His reputation as a prolific writer of pulp fiction novels is supported by his writing of 85 novels in a span of twelve years (as many as seven in a single month) mostly in the crime, suspense, hardboiled, and noir fiction genres. In total, he published over 200 novels. Seven of his writings were produced for the screen, including the television series Lawman (1958–1962). His reputation as 'The King of the Pulps' is shared with author H. Bedford-Jones. Eight of Whittington's hardboiled noir novels were republished by Stark House Press.

== Pseudonyms ==
Whittington was published both under his own name, and with several pseudonyms:

1. Ashley Carter
2. Curt Colman
3. John Dexter
4. Tabor Evans
5. Whit Harrison
6. Robert Hart-Davis
7. Kel Holland
8. Harriet Kathryn Myers
9. Suzanne Stephens
10. Blaine Stevens
11. Clay Stuart
12. Hondo Wells
13. Harry White
14. Hallam Whitney
15. Henri Whittier
16. J. X. Williams
17. William Vaneer

== Bibliography ==
=== as Harry Whittington ===
- Vengeance Valley (1947)
- Her Sin (1947)
- Slay Ride for a Lady (1950)
- The Brass Monkey (1951)
- Call Me Killer (1951)
- Fires That Destroy (1951)
- The Lady Was a Tramp (a.k.a. Murder at Midnight) (1951)
- Married to Murder (1951)
- Murder Is My Mistress (1951)
- Drawn to Evil (1952)
- Forever Evil (1952)
- Mourn the Hangman (1952)
- Satan's Widow (a.k.a. Dear Deadly Past) (1952)
- Body and Passion (1952)
- Girl on Parole (1952)
- Savage Love (1952)
- Swamp Kill (1952)
- So Dead My Love (a.k.a. Let's Count Our Dead) (1953)
- Vengeful Sinner (a.k.a. Die, Lover) (1953)
- Sinner's Club (a.k.a. Teen-Age Jungle) (1954)
- You'll Die Next (1954)
- Love Cult (1954)
- The Naked Jungle (1955)
- One Got Away (1955)
- Saddle the Storm (1955)
- Brute in Brass (a.k.a. Forgive Me, Killer) (1956)
- Desire in The Dust (1956)
- Girl on Sin Street (1956)
- The Humming Box (a.k.a. A Package of Murder) (1956)
- Saturday Night Town (1956)
- A Woman on the Place (1956)
- Across That River (1957)
- Man in the Shadow (1957)
- One Deadly Dawn (1957)
- Play for Keeps (1957)
- Temptations of Valerie (1957)
- Trouble Rides Tall (1958)
- Web Of Murder (1958)
- Backwoods Tramp (a.k.a. A Moment to Prey) (1959)
- Halfway to Hell (1959)
- Shack Road Girl (1959)
- Strange Bargain (1959)
- Strangers on Friday (1959)
- A Ticket to Hell (1959)
- Lust for Love (1959)
- Naked Lust (1959) (credited to Shep Shepard, who may be Harry Whittington)
- Connolly's Woman (1960)
- The Devil Wears Wings (1960)
- Guerrilla Girls (1960)
- Heat of Night (1960)
- Hell Can Wait (1960)
- Rebel Woman (1960)
- A Night for Screaming (1960)
- Strip the Town Naked (1960)
- Vengeance Is the Spur (1960)
- Nita's Place (1960)
- God's Back Was Turned (1961)
- Journey Into Violence (1961)
- A Woman Possessed (1961)
- Desert Stake-Out (1961) (sometimes credited to Whittington's pseudonym Hondo Wells)
- A Trap for Sam Dodge (1961)
- The Young Nurses (1961)
- 69 Babylon Park (1962)
- A Haven for the Damned (1962)
- Hot as Fire, Cold as Ice (1962)
- Wild Sky (1962)
- Cora Is a Nympho (1963)
- Don't Speak to Strange Girls (1963)
- Drygulch Town & Prairie Raiders(1963) (two novels in one volume)
- Cross the Red Creek (1964)
- The Fall of the Roman Empire (1964)
- Hangrope Town (1964)
- Wild Lonesome (1965)
- The Doomsday Affair (1965) (part of the television series The Man from U.N.C.L.E.)
- Valley of Savage Men (1965)
- Doomsday Mission (1967)
- Burden's Mission (1968)
- Treachery Trail (1968) (part of the television series Bonanza)
- Charro (1969)
- High Fury (1970)
- Rampage (1978)
- Heat of Night (2012)

Omnibus

- Drawn to Evil / The Scarlet Spade (1952) (with Eaton Goldthwaite)
- Night for Screaming / Any Woman He Wanted (2006)
- To Find Cora / Like Mink Like Murder / Body and Passion (2009)
- Rapture Alley / Winter Girl / Strictly for the Boys (2012)

Collections

- Pulp Masters: Stories (2001) (with Martin H. Greenberg and Ed Gorman)
- The Dimes of Harry Whittington Vol. 1 (2000)
- The Dimes of Harry Whittington Vol. 2 (2000)
- The Dimes of Harry Whittington Vol. 3 (2000)

=== as Ashley Carter ===
- The Sword of the Golden Stud (1977)
- Panama (1978)
- Against All Gods (1982)
- The Outlanders (1983)
- Embrace the Wind (1984)
- A Darkling Moon (1985)
- Strange Harvest (1987) (with Kyle Onstott)

Blackoaks Series

- Master of Blackoaks (1977) (with Lance Horner)
- Secret of Blackoaks (1980)
- Heritage of Blackoaks (1981)
- A Farewell to Blackoaks (1984)

Falconhurst Series

- Taproots of Falconhurst (1979)
- Scandal of Falconhurst (1980)
- Rogue of Falconhurst (1983)
- Road to Falconhurst (1983) (with Lance Horner)
- Miz Lucretia of Falconhurst (1985)
- Mandingo Master (a.k.a. Mandingo Mansa)(1986)
- Falconhurst Fugitive (1988)

=== as Whit Harrison ===
- Swamp Kill (1951)
- Body and Passion (a.k.a. Dear Deadly Past) (1952)
- Girl on Parole (1952)
- Savage Love (1952)
- Violent Night (a.k.a. Rogue Cop) (1952)
- Sailor's Weekend (1952)
- Rapture Alley (1953)
- Shanty Road (1953)
- Army Girl (1953)
- Strip the Town Naked (1960)
- A Woman Possessed (1961)

=== as Harriet Kathryn Myers ===
- Small Town Nurse (1962)
- Prodigal Nurse (1963)

=== as Blaine Stevens ===
- The Outlanders (1979
- Embrace the Wind (1982)
- Island of Kings (1988)

=== as John Dexter ===
(John Dexter was a pen name used by many authors. These novels are believed to be written by Harry Whittington)

- Isle of Sin (1961)
- Passion Gang (1962)
- Shame Dame (1963)
- Flesh Curse (1964)
- Pushover (1964)
- Saddle Sinners (1964)
- Sin Psycho (1964)
- Lust Dupe (1964)
- Sin Is Where You Find It (1965)
- Baptism in Shame (1965)
- Passion Ring (1965)
- Remembered Sin (1965)
- Sharing Sharon (1965)
- Sin Fishers (1965)
- The Wedding Affair (1965)
- Passion Burned (1965)
- Shame Union (1965)
- The Shame Tigers (1966)
- The Abortionists (1966)
- The Sinning Room (1966)
- Blood Lust Orgy (1966)
- Chuck-A-Lust (1967)

=== as Kel Holland ===
- You'll Die Next! (1954)
- Web of murder (1958)
- The Strange Young Wife (1963)
- The Tempted (1964)
- Forgive Me, Killer (1987)

=== as Clay Stuart ===
- His Brother's Wife (1964)

=== as Hallam Whitney ===
- Backwoods Hussy (1952)
- City Girl (1952)
- Shack Road (1952)
- Backwoods Shack (1953)
- The Wild Seed (1956)

=== as J.X. Williams ===
- The Lust Sleepers (1964)
- The Shame Hiders (1964)
- Lust Farm (1964)
- Flesh Avenger (1964)
- Passion Flayed (1965)
- Passion Hangover (1965)
- Lust Buyer (1965)
- Man Hater (1965)
- Flesh Snare (1966)
- Sisters in Sin (1966)
- Baby face (1966)
- Passion Cache (1966)
- Parisian Passions (1966)
- Saigon Sin-Spree (1967)
- High School Harlots (1967)

=== as Harry White ===
- Shadow at Noon (1955)

=== as Curt Colman ===
- Flamingo Terrace (1965)
- Flesh Mother (1965)
- Hell Bait (1966)
- The Taste of Desire (1966)
- The Latent Lovers (1966)
- Sinners after Six (1966)
- Sin Deep (1966)
- Sinsurance (1966)
- Grim Peeper (1967)
- Balcony Of Shame (1967)
- Mask Of Lust (1967)

=== as Tabor Evans ===
(Tabor Evans was a pen name used by many authors who wrote the "Longarm" western series of books. These novels are known to be written by Harry Whittington)

- Longarm On the Humboldt (1981)
- Longarm and the Golden Lady (1981)
- Longarm and the Blue Norther (1981)
- Longarm in Silver City (1982)
- Longarm in Boulder Canyon (1982)
- Longarm in the Big Thicket (1982)

== Film adaptations ==
- Desire in the Dust (1960)
- Black Gold (1962) based on a story by Harry Whittington.
- Adiós gringo (1965)
- Dead in the Water (1991) from Web of Murder (1958)
- Frontier Crucible (2025) from Desert Stake-Out (1961)

== Sources ==
- Bio at bleekerbooks.com
- Harry Whittington: The King of Pulp Originals
