= Thomas B. Dewey =

American novelist

Thomas Blanchard Dewey (Elkhart, Indiana, March 6, 1915 – Tempe, Arizona, April 1981) was an American author of hardboiled crime novels. He created two series of novels: the first one features Mac, a private investigator from Chicago, the second features Pete Schoefield.

== Bibliography ==
=== Mac series ===
- Draw the Curtain Close, 1947
- Every Bet's a Sure Thing, 1953
- Prey for Me, 1954
- The Mean Streets, 1954
- The Brave, Bad Girls, 1956
- You've Got Him Cold, 1958
- The Case of the Chased and the Chaste, 1959
- The Girl Who Wasn't There, 1960
- How Hard to Kill, 1962
- A Sad Song Singing, 1963
- Don't Cry for Long, 1964
- Portrait of a Dead Heiress, 1965
- "The Big Job" (short story), 1965
- Deadline, 1966
- Death and Taxes, 1967
- The King Killers, 1968
- The Love-Death Thing, 1969
- The Taurus Trip, 1970

=== Pete Schoefield series ===
- And When She Stops, 1957
- Go To Sleep, Jeannie, 1959
- Too Hot For Hawaii, 1960
- The Golden Hooligan, 1961
- Go Honeylou, 1962
- The Girl with the Sweet Plump Knees, 1963
- The Girl in the Punchbowl, 1964
- Only on Tuesdays, 1964
- Nude in Nevada, 1964

=== Other ===
- Hue And Cry, 1944
- As Good as Dead, 1946
- Mourning After, 1950
- My Love Is Violent, 1956
- The Case of the Murdered Model, 1959
- The Girl Who Wasn't There, 1960
- Hunter at Large, 1961
