= Lawrence Treat =

American novelist (1903–1998)

Lawrence Arthur Goldstone (1903–1998), better known by his pen name, Lawrence Treat, was an American mystery writer, a pioneer of the genre of novels that became known as police procedurals. Treat began his professional life as a lawyer, having attended Dartmouth College and Columbia Law School. When his law firm broke up in 1928, shortly after he had begun to work there, he traveled to Paris. A friend living in Brittany provided him with free room and board, and Goldstone decided to settle down and teach himself to write. His knowledge of law led him to try his hand at crime writing. He sold his very first novel and returned to the United States to write full-time.

In a career that would span over seventy years, Treat wrote several hundred short stories for mystery magazines and other publications. He was a founding member of the Mystery Writers of America and a two-time winner of the MWA's Edgar Award. His first award came in 1965, for the short story "H as in Homicide"; his second was a Special Edgar Award in 1978 for editing a new edition of the Mystery Writer's Handbook, the MWA's guide for aspiring mystery writers, first published in 1956.

As a member of the League of American Writers, he served on its Keep America Out of War Committee in January 1940 during the period of the Hitler-Stalin pact. He died on January 7, 1998, in his hometown of Martha's Vineyard, Massachusetts at the age of 94.

== Selected works ==
- Run Far, Run Fast (1937)
- B as in Banshee (1940)
- D as in Dead (1941)
- H as in Hangman (1942)
- O as in Omen (1943)
- Wail for the Corpses (1943)
- Leather Man (1944)
- V as in Victim (1945)
- H as in Hunted (1946)
- Q as in Quicksand (1947)
- T as in Trapped (1947)
- F as in Flight (1948)
- Over the Edge (1948)
- Trial and Terror (1949)
- Big Shot (1951)
- Lady, Drop Dead (1960)
- Venus Unarmed (1961)
- P as in Police (edited by Ellery Queen) (1970)
- Crime and Puzzlement (1981)
- Crime and Puzzlement 2 (1982)
- The Clue Armchair Detective (1983)
- Crime and Puzzlement 3 (1988)
- Crime and Puzzlement 4: My Cousin Phoebe (1991)
- Crime and Puzzlement 5: On Martha's Vineyard, Mostly (1993)
