= Jack Webb (novelist) =

American novelist (1916–2008)

- Born: John Alfred Webb; January 13, 1916; Los Angeles, California
- Died: February 12, 2008 (aged 92); Coronado, California, U.S.A.
- Other name: John Farr
- Occupation: Writer

John Alfred Webb (January 13, 1916 – February 12, 2008) was an American mystery novelist best known for his series featuring the detective team of Sammy Golden and Father Joseph Shanley. His varied career included working for the San Diego Zoo, military service in World War II, and later roles in advertising and technical writing. He died in Coronado, California.

== Career ==
After graduating from Occidental College in Los Angeles with a degree in English literature, Webb worked in the Department of Birds at the San Diego Zoo before joining the U.S. Army's Office of Strategic Services during World War II. Following the war, Webb held jobs in advertising and technical writing, experiences that later shaped the detail and background of his fiction.

Webb is primarily remembered for his nine-volume series featuring Catholic priest Father Joseph Shanley and Jewish detective Sergeant Sammy Golden. This team was praised by Anthony Boucher as a “first-rate serious idea” and, over time, became “esteemed old friends” to readers. Webb's other works include successful standalone thrillers and animal-themed mysteries written under the pseudonym John Farr, such as Don't Feed the Animals and She-Shark, featuring reptile expert Cy Clements at the San Diego Zoo.

== Works ==
=== Novels as Jack Webb ===
Sammy Golden & Joseph Shanley series

1. The Big Sin (Rinehart & Company, hardback, 1952)
2. The Naked Angel aka Such Women Are Dangerous (Rinehart, hardback, 1953)
3. The Damned Lovely (Rinehart, hardback, 1954)
4. The Broken Doll (Rinehart, hardback, 1955)
5. The Bad Blonde (Rinehart, hardback, 1956)
6. The Brass Halo (Rinehart, hardback, 1957)
7. The Deadly Sex (Rinehart, hardback, 1959)
8. The Delicate Darling (Rinehart, hardback, 1959)
9. The Gilded Witch (Regency Books, paperback original, 1963)

Standalones

- One for My Dame (Holt, Rinehart & Winston, hardback, 1961)
- Make My Bed Soon (Holt, Rinehart & Winston, hardback, 1963)

Reprints and Omnibus Editions

- One for My Dame / The Deadly Combo: Two Thrillers by Jack Webb (Stark House Press, 2025) — first full reprint of The Deadly Combo, with a new introduction by Nicholas Litchfield.

=== Novels as John Farr ===
- Don't Feed the Animals (Abelard-Schuman, hardback, 1955) reissued as Naked Fear and Zoo Murders
- She Shark (Ace Books, paperback, 1956) reissued in Australia as Murder Ship (Phantom Books, paperback, 1958)
- The Lady and the Snake (Ace Books, paperback, 1957)
- The Deadly Combo (Ace Books, paperback, 1958) double book edition together with J. Harvey Bond's Murder isn't Funny

== Assessment and Legacy ==
Webb's narratives were known for their literate style and action-driven plots. Mystery novelist Bill Crider described One for My Dame as “literate” and observed, “while the resolution seems a bit drawn out, the rest of the book more than compensates.”

Contemporary interest in Webb's work was renewed with the 2025 Stark House Press omnibus reprinting One for My Dame and The Deadly Combo. In his introduction to that volume, book critic Nicholas Litchfield called One for My Dame “concise, engaging, and likable,” adding that Webb “artfully blends hit-and-miss humor with hardboiled action while simultaneously offering profound reflections on war and heroism,” though he also noted some “implausible plots” and “unlikely coincidences.” Prolific author and reviewer James Reasoner commented that The Deadly Combo “is both a fast-paced, violent, hardboiled mystery and a love letter to jazz music... Webb’s writing is the prose equivalent of jazz, swooping and swirling almost into improvisation at times.”
