= John Roscoe =

British Anglican missionary

John Roscoe (1861–1932) was an Anglican missionary to East Africa. He conducted anthropological data collection of the Africans he encountered on mission.

Roscoe was born in 1861, during the height of the Victorian era. Roscoe's career heavily echoed the Victorian notion of improving natives under British rule. He studied civil engineering before joining the Anglican Church Missionary Society. In 1884, on mission, he travelled to what became the Uganda Protectorate, and lived there among several African tribes until 1909. From his experiences in Africa, Roscoe wrote Twenty-Five Years in East Africa, which was published in 1921. He intended the book to be an anthropological reference for Britons.

The trajectory of Roscoe’s career seems to mimic that of David Livingstone, and indeed, Livingstone was a prominent influence on Roscoe. Though Roscoe’s attitude toward Africa’s salvation was more pragmatic and less fervent than that of Livingstone, reflective of his later imperial era in which the British had already established their presence in Africa, he recognized Livingstone’s contributions to British endeavours on the continent. He directly cited Livingstone’s “excellent work in exposing [slavery],” and references and expands upon Livingstone’s ideas of how to best approach the continent. Like Livingstone, Roscoe believed that Christianity would benefit the Africans, and like Livingstone, Roscoe also believed that the scientific study of Africa was necessary.
