= Peter Rabe =

American writer

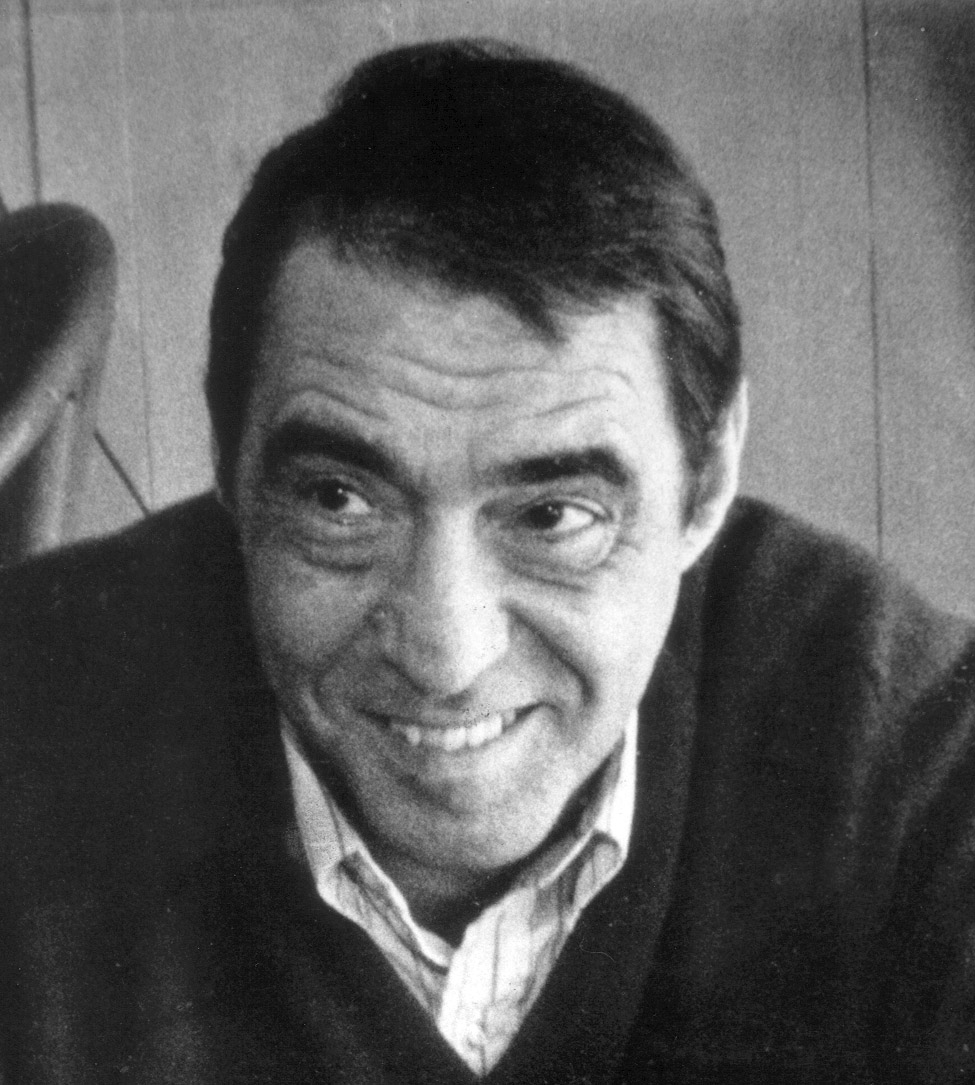
- Peter Rabe
- Born: November 3, 1921; Halle, Saxony-Anhalt, Germany
- Died: May 20, 1990 (aged 68); Atascadero, California
- Occupations: Novelist, screenwriter
- Spouse(s): Claire, Kristen (Kiki), Barbara
- Children: 3 - Jonathan, Julia, Jennifer
- Writing career
- Pen name: Marco Malaponte, J. T. MacCargo
- Period: 1955–1990?
- Genres: Crime fiction, mystery fiction, spy fiction

Peter Rabe (born Peter Rabinowitsch, November 3, 1921 – May 20, 1990) was a German American writer who also wrote under the names Marco Malaponte and J. T. MacCargo (though not all of the latter's books were by him). Rabe was the author of over 30 books, mostly of crime fiction, published between 1955 and 1975.

== Origins ==
Born Peter Rabinowitsch on November 3, 1921, to Michael Rabinovitch (a Russian Jew; the spelling is the Russian version) and Elisabeth Margarete Beer, in Halle, Saxony-Anhalt, Germany. Shortly after his birth the family moved to Hanover, Germany, where Peter's father worked as a doctor and surgeon.

When the Nazis came to power and summoned Michael Rabinovitch to a Gestapo office and confronted him with transcripts of political conversations between him and his patients, he decided it best to emigrate to the United States before Peter turned 15 and face possible internment. Michael also had his doctor's license revoked by the Nazis. Michael and Peter left a few months before Kristallnacht in October, 1938, sponsored by Michael's brother Robert Rubin, and they lived with the Rubin family in Detroit, Michigan. At Rubin's suggestion, Michael changed the family name to "Rabe," by combining his name (the "Ra" from Rabinovitch) and his wife's maiden name (the "Be" from Beer). He took over the practice of a retiring obstetrician in New Bremen, Ohio, a German American town. Margarete, a Lutheran, brought her other two sons, Valentin and Andreas, on the last ship of refugees before World War II broke out.

== Education ==
Peter earned his bachelor's degree from Ohio State University, then served a stint in the Army. He attended Western Reserve University in Cleveland and was awarded a master's degree and a Ph.D. in psychology.

== Early career ==
While at Western Reserve, Rabe met Claire Frederickson, also a psychology student and member of a family who had left Europe ahead of the Nazis. Claire introduced Peter to fellow student Max Gartenberg, who would eventually become Peter's literary agent.

Claire and Peter married and moved to Bar Harbor, Maine, where Peter worked as a researcher for Claire's brother, Emil Frederickson. Peter was uncomfortable experimenting on animals and after the project ended the couple moved to Los Angeles to try to establish Peter as a therapist. It was hard to break in and after a short time the couple returned to Cleveland.

Peter did blue-collar work in a factory but was soon asked to work on the company's advertising layouts. This work served him well as Peter used these skills to write and illustrate his first book, From Here to Maternity (Vanguard Press, 1955; originally appeared in McCall's Magazine, September 1954, as "Who's Having This Baby?"), a humorous look at the birth of his and Claire's first son, Jonathan, born April 5, 1953.

== Crime fiction ==
After his first book, Rabe wrote almost exclusively crime fiction, the exceptions being three soft core books for Beacon in the early sixties, and a novelization of the war movie Tobruk for Bantam in 1967.

In an essay included in the book Murder off the Rack, edited by Jon L. Breen, Donald E. Westlake opens with the line, "Peter Rabe wrote the best books with the worst titles of anybody I can think of." When Gold Medal changed the titles of Rabe's first two books from The Ticker and The Hook to Stop This Man! and Benny Muscles In, a pattern was set that would last throughout his career.

Stop This Man! appeared in August, 1955 (Gold Medal 506), followed closely by Benny Muscles In (Gold Medal 520, September, 1955), and A Shroud for Jesso (Gold Medal 528, October, 1955). Clearly capable of writing books quickly, Rabe published eighteen books by 1961.

In 1962 came one of his best books, The Box (one of only two Rabe books to use his own titles, the other being A House in Naples). Then there were the three soft core books for Beacon, the last two under the pseudonym of Marco Malaponte. After this came the three books about his second series character, Manny DeWitt, the novelization of Tobruk, and then the final books to appear under his own name. These were a pair of Mafia related books, again for Gold Medal (War of the Dons (Gold Medal M2592, 1972), and Black Mafia (Gold Medal M2939).

The last books Rabe published before he backed off from his writing career were novelizations of episodes of the television series "Mannix" using the pseudonym "J. T. MacCargo." This was Belmont's Mannix book-series house name, under which Belmont editor and veteran pulpsmith Peter McCurtin penned the first and third of the four titles. Rabe wrote the second and fourth books, A Fine Day for Dying and Round Trip to Nowhere, both appearing in 1975. They were the last of his books to be published in his lifetime. (The adaptive books in the Belmont series, the last to be based on the TV show, were unrelated to the one-off original written by Michael Avallone, based on the different format of Mannix's first season, published by Popular Library in 1968.)

== Non-writing life ==
In the late '50s, Rabe had gastro-intestinal problems that led to a mis-diagnosis of terminal cancer. He moved to Europe for treatment where his marriage eventually ended and he moved back to the United States. He had met Lorenzo Semple Jr. in Spain and later, after Semple began work for the Batman television series, Rabe wrote two episodes: "The Joker's Last Laugh" and "The Joker's Epitaph."

He went on to two other marriages, neither of which lasted, and left the writing life to become a teacher of psychology at California Polytechnic State University. His only other children were also with Claire, who published some fiction of her own in the 1960s, later collected in 1989's Sicily Enough and More. Also in the 1980s Black Lizard began reprinting some of Rabe's earlier classics. Beginning in 2003, Stark House Press has been reprinting Rabe works in two for one trade paperback editions.

Rabe settled down in Atascadero, California until his death from lung cancer on May 20, 1990.

== Other work ==
Although Rabe left the writing life for his teaching career, he didn't stop writing. This led to two unpublished novels probably written between 1987 and 1990, The Return of Marvin Palaver and The Silent Wall. Shortly before his death, Rabe had sent these to writer Ed Gorman in an effort to see them published and in 2010, both works will appear in a single volume from Stark House Press.

Rabe may only have written two short stories in his career. One, “Hard Case Redhead,” is an excellent story with a debatable ending, hard core and noirish up to its final paragraph, which gives us an almost Hitchcockian twist ending.

The other, "A Matter of Balance," is a perfectly titled story of two soldiers, each a cipher to the other, pushed together in what for one is an impossible situation. The emotional buttons Rabe pushes, the real contrast between the characters, and the morally and thematically ambiguous ending make it a nearly pitch perfect telling.

He also contributed two scripts to the "Batman" television series (see above).

== Writing style ==
He was a subtle writer, and the dialogue and choices made by his characters show them off in unusual ways, often with seemingly unpredictable behavior that turns out to be entirely consistent with who they are as well as the plot of the book.

== Books ==
Publication dates from www.mysteryfile.com by Steve Lewis

- From Here to Maternity, 1955 (non-fiction)
- Stop This Man!, 1955
- Benny Muscles In, 1955
- A Shroud for Jesso, 1955
- A House in Naples, 1956
- Kill the Boss Good-By, 1956
- Dig My Grave Deep, 1956 (Daniel Port series)
- The Out is Death, 1957 (Daniel Port series)
- Agreement to Kill, 1957
- It’s My Funeral, 1957 (Daniel Port series)
- Journey into Terror, 1957
- The Cut of the Whip, 1958 (Daniel Port series)
- Mission for Vengeance, 1958
- Blood on the Desert, 1958
- Bring Me Another Corpse, 1959 (Daniel Port series)
- Time Enough to Die, 1959 (Daniel Port series)
- Anatomy of a Killer, 1960
- My Lovely Executioner, 1960
- Murder Me for Nickels, 1960
- The Box, 1962
- His Neighbor’s Wife, 1962
- Her High School Lover (as by Marco Malaponte), 1962
- New Man in the House (as by Marco Malaponte), 1962
- Girl in a Big Brass Bed, 1965 (Manny DeWitt series)
- The Spy Who Was Three Feet Tall, 1966 (Manny DeWitt series)
- Code Name Gadget, 1967 (Manny DeWitt series)
- Tobruk (novelization of movie), 1967
- War of the Dons, 1972
- Black Mafia, 1974
- A Fine Day for Dying (Mannix novelization as by J. T. MacCargo), 1975
- Round Trip to Nowhere (Mannix novelization as by J. T. MacCargo), 1975
- A Walk on the Blind Side (Mannix novelization as by J. T. MacCargo), 1975
- The Silent Wall, 2011
- The Return of Marvin Palaver, 2011
