= William Campbell Gault =

American writer of fiction (1910–1995)

William Campbell Gault (1910–1995) was an American writer. He wrote under his own name, and as Roney Scott and Will Duke, among other pseudonyms.

He is probably best remembered for his sports fiction, particularly the young-readers' novels he began publishing in the early 1960s, and for his crime fiction.

He contributed to a wide range of pulp magazines, particularly to the sports pulps, where he was considered one of the best writers in the field. Damon Knight, noted science fiction critic and one-time editor of Popular Publications, wrote the following about Gault's sports fiction:

I liked the characterization in those stories; I liked the description; I liked the fist fights; I liked the love interest. I like everything about them, except what they were all about.

Gault won the 1953 Edgar Award for Best First Novel for his crime fiction novel, Don't Cry for Me (1952). He won the Shamus Award for Best P.I. Paperback Original in 1983 for The Cana Diversion and was awarded The Eye in 1984 for Lifetime Achievement, both by The Private Eye Writers of America. In 1991, he was presented Bouchercon's Lifetime Achievement Award.

== Sports fiction ==
- Backfield Challenge
- The Big Stick
- Bruce Benedict, Halfback
- The Checkered Flag
- Cut-rate Quarterback
- Dim Thunder
- Dirt Track Summer
- Drag Strip
- Gallant Colt
- Gasoline Cowboy
- The Karters
- The Last Lap
- Little Big Foot
- The Lonely Mound
- The Long Green
- Mr. Fullback
- Mr. Quarterback
- The Oval Playground
- Quarterback Gamble
- Road-Race Rookie
- Rough Road To Glory
- Showboat in the Backcourt
- Speedway Challenge
- Stubborn Sam
- The Sunday Cycles
- Sunday's Dust
- Super Bowl Bound
- Thin Ice
- Through The Line
- Thunder Road
- Trouble at Second
- Two-Wheeled Thunder
- The Underground Skipper
- Wheels of Fortune
- Wild Willie, Wide Receiver

== Crime fiction ==
Gault's most famous detective protagonist is Brock Callahan, L.A. football star who quit because of a bad knee and set up shop in Beverly Hills as a private investigator; several re-issued in paperback by Charter Books, circa 1988. He also wrote a series of paperback originals in the 1950s and 1960s featuring private detective Joe Puma, whose career was spent on the seamier side of life.

=== Brock Callahan titles ===
- Murder In The Raw (1955) original title "Ring Around Rosa"
- Day of The Ram (1956)
- The Convertible Hearse (1957)
- Come Die With Me (1959)
- Vein of Violence (1961)
- County Kill (1962)
- Dead Hero (1963)
- The Bad Samaritan (1982)
- The Cana Diversion (1982)
- Death In Donegal Bay (1984)
- The Dead Seed (1985)
- The Chicano War (1986)
- Cat and Mouse (1988)
- Deaf Pigeon (1992)

=== Joe Puma titles ===
- Shakedown (1953 as by Roney Scott)
- End of a Call Girl (1958 aka Don't Call Tonight)
- Night Lady (1958)
- Sweet Wild Wench (1959)
- The Wayward Widow (1959)
- Million Dollar Tramp (1960)
- The Hundred Dollar Girl (1961)

=== Non-series Paperback Original Mysteries ===
- Don't Cry For Me (1952)
- The Bloody Bokhara (1952; aka The Bloodstained Bokhara)
- The Canvas Coffin (1953)
- Blood on the Boards (1953)
- Run, Killer, Run (1954)
- Square in the Middle (1956)
- Fair Prey (1956; as Will Duke)
- Phantom (1957)
- Death Out of Focus (1959)
- The Sweet Blonde Trap (1959)

=== Short story collection ===
- Marksman (Crippen & Landru, 2003)
