= Bruce Cassiday =

American writer and editor

Bruce Cassiday (1920–2005) was an American writer and editor. He was the author and editor of pulp fiction, suspense and espionage stories, Gothics, medical melodramas, radio and TV dramas and novelizations, "how-to" books on landscaping, home carpentry, solar houses, ghostwritten biographies, and reader's guides on detective, mystery and science-fiction literature.

He was married to Doris Galloway in 1950, and they had a son and a daughter. He died in Stamford, Connecticut, on January 12, 2005, of Parkinson's disease, from which he had suffered since 1999. He was the son of California architect, Robert M. Cassiday and Persis Bingham Cassiday, an architectural author.

== Works ==
by	genre	title	year	comment
Bruce Cassiday	MY	The Buried Motive	1957
Bruce Cassiday	MY	Brass Shroud	1958
Carson Bingham	na	Gorgo	1960
Bruce Cassiday	MY	The Corpse in the Picture Window	1961
Bruce Cassiday	na	Angels Ten	1966
Con Steffanson	SF	4: The Time Trap of Ming XIII	1974	Flash Gordon
Carson Bingham	SF	5: The Witch Queen of Mongo	1974	Flash Gordon
Carson Bingham	SF	6: The War of the Cybernauts	1975	Flash Gordon
Bruce Cassiday	NF	The Illustrated History of Science Fiction	1989	with Dieter Wuckel
Bruce Cassiday	NF	My Life in the Pulps: Guest of Honor Speech, Pulpcon #23	1996	essay
