= Russell R. Winterbotham =

American novelist

Russell Robert Winterbotham (August 1, 1904 – June 9, 1971) was an American writer of western and science fiction genre fiction, and the author of instructional pamphlets and several Big Little Books. He also wrote crime stories and one science fiction novel (The Other World) using the pen name "J. Harvey Bond". Another science fiction novel used the pseudonym "Franklin Hadley". He also wrote scripts for Fred Harman's western comic Red Ryder and the newspaper comic strip Chris Welkin, Planeteer.

Winterbotham was born in Salina, Kansas, and died in Bay Village, Ohio. While writing, his full-time job was as a fiction editor for Scripps-Howard NEA news service.

== Bibliography ==
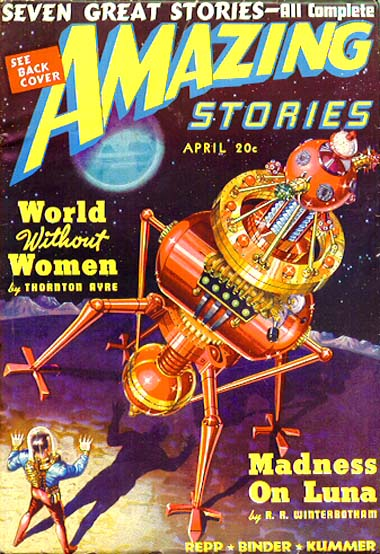
Winterbotham's "Madness on Luna" was the cover story in the April 1939 Amazing Stories

- Curious and Unusual Deaths (Girard, Kansas:Haldeman-Julius, 1929)
- Maximo, the Amazing Superman (Big Little Book, 1940)
- The Whispering Spheres (Comet, July 1941)
- Convoy Patrol: a thrilling story of the U.S. Navy (1942)
- Ray Land of the Tank Corps U.S.A. (1942)
- How Comic Strips are Made (1946)
- Chris Welkin - Planeteer (comic strip, 1952–1964)
- Murder Isn't Funny (as J. Harvey Bond, 1958)
- Bye Bye, Baby! (as J. Harvey Bond, 1958)
- Kill Me With Kindness (as J. Harvey Bond, 1959)
- If Wishes Were Hearses (as J. Harvey Bond, 1961)
- The Red Planet (1962)
- The Space Egg (Hardback 1958, Paperback 1963)
- The Men from Arcturus (1963)
- The Other World (as by J. Harvey Bond, 1963)
- The Puppet Planet (1964)
- Planet Big Zero (1964) (as by Franklin Hadley)
- The Lord of Nardos (1966)
