= Day Keene =

American writer and screenwriter (1904–1969)

Gunard Hjertstedt
- Born: March 28, 1904; Chicago, Illinois
- Died: January 9, 1969 (aged 64); Los Angeles, California
- Occupations: Novelist, Short Story Writer
- Writing career
- Pen name: Day Keene
- Genres: Crime fiction, Mystery fiction
- Notable works: Framed in Guilt (1949), Home Is the Sailor (1952)

Gunard Hjertstedt (March 28, 1904 – January 9, 1969), better known by pen name Day Keene, was an American novelist, short story writer and radio and television scriptwriter. Keene wrote over 50 novels and was the head writer for radio soap operas Little Orphan Annie and Kitty Keene, Inc. Several of his novels were adapted into movies, including Joy House (MGM, 1964) and Chautauqua, released as The Trouble with Girls (MGM, 1969).

== Bibliography ==
=== Novels ===
genre	title	year	publisher	comment
MY	Framed in Guilt	1949
MY	Evidence Most Blind	-		reissue of Framed in Guilt
MY	Farewell to Passion	1951
MY	The Passion Murders	-		reissue of Farewell to Passion
MY	My Flesh Is Sweet	1951
MY	Love Me and Die	1951
MY	To Kiss or Kill	1951
MY	Hunt the Killer	1952
MY	About Doctor Ferrel	1952
MY	Home Is the Sailor	1952
MY	If the Coffin Fits	1952
MY	Naked Fury	1952
MY	Wake Up to Murder	1952
MY	Mrs. Homicide	1953
MY	Strange Witness	1953
MY	The Big Kiss-Off	1954
MY	There Was A Crooked Man	1954
MY	Death House Doll	1954
MY	His Father's Wife	1954
MY	Homicidal Lady	1954
MY	Joy House	1954
MY	Notorious	1954
MY	Sleep with the Devil	1954
MY	Who Has Wilma Lathrop?	1955
MY	The Dangling Carrot	1955	Ace Books
MY	Flight By Night	-	Ace Books
MY	Murder on the Side	1956
MY	Bring Him Back Dead	1956
MY	It's a Sin to Kill	1958
MY	Passage to Samoa	1958
MY	Dead Dolls Don't Talk	1959
MY	Dead in Bed	1959
MY	Moran's Woman	1959
MY	So Dead My Lovely	1959
MY	Take a Step to Murder	1959
MY	Too Black for Heaven	1959
MY	Too Hot to Hold	1959
MY	The Brimstone Bed	1960
MY	Chautauqua	1960
MY	Payola	1960
MY	World Without Women	1960		with Leonard Pruyn
MY	Seed of Doubt	1961
MY	Bye, Baby Bunting	1963
MY	LA 46	1964
MY	Carnival of Death	1965
MY	Miami 59	1965
MY	Chicago 11	1966
MY	Acapulco Gpo	1967
MY	Guns Along the Brazos	1967
MY	Southern Daughter	1967
MY	Live Again, Love Again	1970
MY	Wild Girl	1970

=== Collections ===
- This is Murder, Mr. Herbert, and Other Stories, 1948
- League of the Grateful Dead and Other Stories, 2010
