= List of Ace SF double titles =

List of science fiction books

Ace Books published 221 science fiction Ace doubles between 1952 and 1973 in tête-bêche format, and a further 40 between 1974 and 1978 in a more traditional format in which the two books are both the same way up.

== Genres and collectability ==
Ace published science fiction, mysteries, and westerns, as well as books not in any of these genres. Collectors of these genres have found the Ace doubles an attractive set of books to collect, because of the unusual appearance of the tête-bêche format. This is particularly true for the science fiction books, for which several bibliographic references have been written (see the References section). The format inspired a further series of sf doubles published by Tor Books between 1988 and 1991, the Tor Double Novels.

Because the tête-bêche format is part of the attraction for collectors, some do not regard as true Ace Doubles those books published between 1974 and 1978, which contain two works by one or two authors bound traditionally rather than back-to-back and upside-down (tête-bêche format). All volumes containing two SF works, in the entire 1952 to 1978 series, are listed below, with the late change in format noted.

Each listing gives a publication date; in all cases, that is year of publication by Ace, with the given catalog number, not earliest publication date of the contents. The list is complete for books containing two science fiction titles. Number D-13 in the official series, listed in Miscellaneous Ace Doubles, contains one novel, Cry Plague! by Theodore S. Drachman, which can be regarded as science fiction. Therefore some science fiction collectors treat D-13 the first science fiction Ace Double, although the novel on the other side of the book is a mystery, The Judas Goat by Leslie Edgley.

For more information about the history of these titles, see Ace Books, which includes a discussion of the serial numbering conventions used and an explanation of the letter-code system.

== D Series ==
- D-031 SF A. E. van Vogt The World of Null-A / The Universe Maker (1953)
- D-036 SF Robert E. Howard Conan the Conqueror / Leigh Brackett The Sword of Rhiannon (1953)
- D-044 SF Donald A. Wollheim (ed.) The Ultimate Invader and Other Science-Fiction / Eric Frank Russell Sentinels of Space (1954)
- D-053 SF Murray Leinster Gateway to Elsewhere / A. E. van Vogt The Weapon Shops of Isher (1954)
- D-061 SF L. Sprague de Camp Cosmic Manhunt / Clifford D. Simak Ring Around The Sun (1954)
- D-069 SF Lewis Padgett (Henry Kuttner and C. L. Moore) Beyond Earth's Gates / Andre Norton Daybreak—2250 A. D. (1954)
- D-073 SF Donald A. Wollheim (ed.) Adventures in the Far Future / Donald A. Wollheim (ed.) Tales of Outer Space (1954)
- D-079 SF Francis Rufus Bellamy Atta / Murray Leinster The Brain Stealers (1954)
- D-084 SF Isaac Asimov The Rebellious Stars / Roger Dee An Earth Gone Mad (1954)
- D-094 SF Murray Leinster The Other Side of Here / A. E. van Vogt One Against Eternity (1955)
- D-096 SF Andre Norton The Last Planet / Alan E. Nourse A Man Obsessed (1955)
- D-099 SF Robert Moore Williams Conquest of the Space Sea / Leigh Brackett The Galactic Breed (1955)
- D-103 SF Philip K. Dick Solar Lottery / Leigh Brackett The Big Jump (1955)
- D-110 SF Isaac Asimov The 1,000 Year Plan / Poul Anderson No World of Their Own (1955)
- D-113 SF Dwight V. Swain The Transposed Man / J. T. McIntosh One in 300 (1955)
- D-118 SF Charles L. Harness The Paradox Men / Jack Williamson Dome Around America (1955)
- D-121 SF Andre Norton The Stars are Ours! / Sam Merwin, Jr. Three Faces of Time (1955)
- D-139 SF Nick Boddie Williams The Atom Curtain / Gordon R. Dickson Alien From Arcturus (1956)
- D-146 SF Lee Correy Contraband Rocket / Murray Leinster The Forgotten Planet (1956)
- D-150 SF Philip K. Dick The World Jones Made / Margaret St. Clair Agent of the Unknown (1956)
- D-162 SF Jerry Sohl The Mars Monopoly / R. DeWitt Miller and Anna Hunger The Man Who Lived Forever (1956)
- D-164 SF Gordon R. Dickson Mankind on The Run / Andre Norton The Crossroads of Time (1956)
- D-173 SF Ray Cummings The Man Who Mastered Time / Joseph E. Kelleam Overlords From Space (1956)
- D-176 SF Thomas Calvert McClary Three Thousand Years / Margaret St. Clair The Green Queen (1956)
- D-193 SF Philip K. Dick The Man Who Japed / E. C. Tubb The Space-Born (1956)
- D-199 SF Poul Anderson Planet of No Return / Andre Norton Star Guard (1956)
- D-205 SF Donald A. Wollheim (ed.) The Earth in Peril / Lan Wright Who Speaks of Conquest? (1957)
- D-215 SF Eric Frank Russell Three To Conquer / Robert Moore Williams Doomsday Eve (1957)
- D-223 SF Robert Silverberg The 13th Immortal / James E. Gunn This Fortress World (1957)
- D-227 SF H. Beam Piper and John J. McGuire Crisis in 2140 / Cyril Judd Gunner Cade (1957)
- D-237 SF Robert Silverberg Master of Life and Death / James White The Secret Visitors (1957)
- D-242 SF A. E. van Vogt Empire of the Atom / Frank Belknap Long Space Station #1 (1957)
- D-249 SF Philip K. Dick The Cosmic Puppets / Andre Norton (as Andrew North) Sargasso of Space (1957)
- D-255 SF Kenneth Bulmer City Under the Sea / Poul Anderson Star Ways (1957)
- D-266 SF E. C. Tubb The Mechanical Monarch / Charles L. Fontenay Twice Upon A Time (1958)
- D-277 SF Murray Leinster City on The Moon / Donald A. Wollheim (ed.) Men on The Moon (1958)
- D-286 SF Robert Silverberg Invaders From Earth / Donald A. Wollheim (as David Grinnell) Across Time (1958)
- D-291 SF Robert Silverberg (as Calvin M. Knox) Lest We forget Thee, Earth / Raymond Z. Gallun People Minus X (1958)
- D-295 SF Jack Vance Big Planet / The Slaves of The Klau (1958)
- D-299 SF Andre Norton Star Born / H. Beam Piper and John J. McGuire A Planet for Texans (1958)
- D-303 SF Poul Anderson The Snows of Ganymede / War of the Wing-Men (1958)
- D-311 SF Robert Silverberg Stepsons of Terra / Lan Wright A Man Called Destiny (1958)
- D-315 SF Eric Frank Russell The Space Willies / Six Worlds Yonder (1958)
- D-322 SF Robert Moore Williams The Blue Atom / The Void Beyond and Other Stories (1958)
- D-331 SF Kenneth Bulmer The Secret of Zi / Ray Cummings Beyond the Vanishing Point (1958)
- D-335 SF Poul Anderson The War of Two Worlds / John Brunner Threshold of Eternity (1959)
- D-345 SF Andre Norton (as Andrew North) Plague Ship / Voodoo Planet (1959)
- D-351 SF Edmond Hamilton The Sun Smasher / Robert Silverberg (as Ivar Jorgenson) Starhaven (1959)
- D-358 SF Robert Silverberg (as Calvin M. Knox) The Plot Against Earth / Milton Lesser Recruit for Andromeda (1959)
- D-362 SF John Brunner The 100th Millennium / Donald A. Wollheim (as David Grinnell) Edge of Time (1959)
- D-369 SF Brian W. Aldiss Vanguard From Alpha / Kenneth Bulmer The Changeling Worlds (1959)
- D-375 SF Damon Knight Masters of Evolution / George O. Smith Fire in the Heavens (1959)
- D-381 SF Jerry Sohl One Against Herculum / Andre Norton Secret of the Lost Race (1959)
- D-385 SF John Brunner Echo in the Skull / Alan E. Nourse Rocket to Limbo (1959)
- D-391 SF John Brunner The World Swappers / A. E. van Vogt Siege of the Unseen (1959)
- D-403 SF Murray Leinster The Mutant Weapon / The Pirates of Zan (1959)
- D-407 SF Poul Anderson We Claim These Stars! / Robert Silverberg The Planet Killers (1959)
- D-413 SF Harlan Ellison The Man With Nine Lives / A Touch of Infinity (1959)
- D-421 SF Philip K. Dick Dr. Futurity / John Brunner Slavers of Space (1960)
- D-427 SF Robert Moore Williams World of the Masterminds / To the End of Time and Other Stories (1960)
- D-431 SF A. E. van Vogt Earth's Last Fortress / George O. Smith Lost in Space (1960)
- D-437 SF Andre Norton The Sioux Spaceman / Richard Wilson And Then The Town Took Off (1960)
- D-443 SF Manly Wade Wellman The Dark Destroyers / Brian W. Aldiss Bow Down to Nul (1960)
- D-449 SF Gordon R. Dickson The Genetic General / Time to Teleport (1960)
- D-453 SF Kenneth Bulmer The Earth Gods Are Coming / Margaret St. Clair The Games of Neith (1960)
- D-457 SF Philip K. Dick Vulcan's Hammer / John Brunner The Skynappers (1960)
- D-465 SF John Brunner The Atlantic Abomination / Donald A. Wollheim (as David Grinnell) The Martian Missile (1960)
- D-471 SF John Brunner Sanctuary in the Sky / Jack Sharkey The Secret Martians (1960)
- D-479 SF Wilson Tucker To the Tombaugh Station / Poul Anderson Earthman Go Home! (1960)
- D-485 SF Robert A. W. Lowndes The Puzzle Planet / Lloyd Biggle, Jr. The Angry Espers (1961)
- D-491 SF Fritz Leiber The Big Time / Fritz Leiber The Mind-Spider and Other Stories (1961)
- D-497 SF John Brunner (as Keith Woodcott) I Speak For Earth / Ray Cummings Wandl The Invader (1961)
- D-507 SF Kenneth Bulmer Beyond the Silver Sky / John Brunner Meeting At Infinity (1961)
- D-509 SF Andre Norton The Beast Master / Star Hunter (1961)
- D-517 SF Clifford Simak The Trouble With Tycho / A. Bertram Chandler Bring Back Yesterday (1961)

== F Series ==
- F-104 SF Kenneth Bulmer No Man's World / Poul Anderson Mayday Orbit (1961)
- F-108 SF G. McDonald Wallis The Light of Lilith / Damon Knight The Sun Saboteurs (1961)
- F-113 SF Charles L. Fontenay Rebels of The Red Planet / J. T. McIntosh 200 Hundred Years to Christmas (1961)
- F-117 SF Marion Zimmer Bradley The Door Through Space / A. Bertram Chandler Rendezvous on a Lost World (1961)
- F-119 SF Gordon R. Dickson Spacial Delivery / Delusion World (1961)
- F-123 SF Robert Silverberg Collision Course / Leigh Brackett The Nemesis From Terra (1961)
- F-127 SF Marion Zimmer BradleySeven From The Stars / Keith Laumer Worlds Of The Imperium (1962)
- F-129 SF William F. Temple The Automated Goliath / William F. Temple The Three Suns Of Amara (1962)
- F-133 SF John Brunner Secret Agent of Terra / A. Bertram Chandler The Rim of Space (1962)
- F-139 SF Poul Anderson The Makeshift Rocket/Un-Man and Other Stories (1962)
- F-141 SF Robert Moore Williams The Darkness Before Tomorrow / John Brunner (as Keith Woodcott) The Ladder In The Sky (1962)
- F-145 SF Robert Silverberg Next Stop The Stars / The Seed of Earth (1962)
- F-147 SF Andre Norton The Sea Siege / The Eye of The Monster (1962)
- F-149 SF Robert Moore Williams King of the Fourth Planet / Charles V. de Vet and Katherine MacLean Cosmic Checkmate (1962)
- F-153 SF Marion Zimmer Bradley The Sword of Aldones / The Planet Savers (1962)
- F-161 SF John Brunner Times Without Number / Donald A. Wollheim (as David Grinnel) Destinies Orbit (1962)
- F-165 SF Philip José Farmer Cache From Outer Space / The Celestial Blueprint (1962)
- F-173 SF James White Second Ending / Samuel R. Delany The Jewels of Aptor (1962)
- F-177 SF Terry Carr Warlord of Kor / Robert Moore Williams The Star Wasps (1963)
- F-185 SF Jack Vance 5 Gold Bands / The Dragon Masters (1963)
- F-187 SF Leigh Brackett Alpha Centauri or Die! / G. McDonald Wallis Legend of Lost Earth (1963)
- F-195 SF Robert Silverberg The Silent Invaders / William F. Temple Battle on Venus (1963)
- F-199 SF John Brunner (as Keith Woodcott) The Psionic Menace / Samuel R. Delany Captives of the Flame (1963)
- F-209 SF Ken Bulmer The Wizard of the Starship Poseidon / Poul Anderson Let The Spacemen Beware! (1963)
- F-215 SF John Brunner Listen! The Stars / Jane Roberts The Rebellers (1963)
- F-223 SF Keith Laumer Envoy to New Worlds / Robert Moore Williams Flight From Yesterday (1963)
- F-227 SF John Brunner Astronauts Musn't Land / The Space-Time Juggler (1963)
- F-237 SF A. Bertram Chandler The Ship From Outside / Beyond the Galactic Rim (1963)
- F-242 SF John Brunner The Rites of Ohe / Castaway World (1963)
- F-249 SF L. Sprague de Camp The Hand of Zei/The Search for Zei (1963)
- F-253 SF Robert Silverberg (as Calvin M. Knox) One of Our Asteroids is Missing / A. E. van Vogt The Twisted Men (1964)
- F-261 SF Samuel R. Delany The Towers of Toron / Robert Moore Williams The Lunar Eye (1964)
- F-265 SF Jack Vance The Houses of Iszm / Son of The Tree (1964)
- F-273 SF Marion Zimmer Bradley Falcons of Narabedla / The Dark Intruder (1964)
- F-275 SF Philip E. High No Truce With Terra / Murray Leinster The Duplicators (1964)
- F-285 SF Fritz Leiber Ships to the Stars / Ken Bulmer The Million Year Hunt (1964)
- F-289 SF Ken Bulmer Demons' World / Tom Purdom I Want the Stars (1964)
- F-299 SF John Brunner Endless Shadow/ Gardner Fox The Arsenal of Miracles (1964)

== M Series ==
- M-101 SF Leigh Brackett The Secret of Sinharat / People of the Talisman (1964)
- M-103 SF Fred Saberhagen The Golden People / Lan Wright Exile From Xanadu (1964)
- M-105 SF Margaret St. Clair Message From the Eocene / Three Worlds of Futurity (1964)
- M-107 SF A. Bertram Chandler The Coils of Time / Into The Alternate Universe (1964)
- M-109 SF G.C. Edmondson Stranger Than You Think / The Ship That Sailed the Time Stream (1965)
- M-111 SF Edmond Hamilton Fugitive of the Stars / Kenneth Bulmer Land Beyond the Map (1965)
- M-113 SF Damon Knight Off Center / The Rithian Terror (1965)
- M-115 SF John Brunner The Repairmen of Cyclops / Enigma From Tantalus (1965)
- M-117 SF Bruce W. Ronald Our Man in Space / Jack Sharkey Ultimatum in 2050 A.D. (1965)
- M-121 SF Emil Petaja Alpha Yes, Terra No! / Samuel R. Delany The Ballad of Beta-2 (1965)
- M-123 SF John Brunner The Altar on Asconel / Ted White Android Avenger (1965)
- M-125 SF Jack Vance Monsters in Orbit / The World Between and Other Stories (1965)
- M-127 SF John Rackham We, The Venusians / Fred Saberhagen The Water of Thought (1965)
- M-129 SF A. Bertram Chandler The Alternate Martians / A. Bertram Chandler Empress of Outer Space (1965)
- M-131 SF Kenneth Bulmer Behold The Stars / Mack Reynolds Planetary Agent X (1965)
- M-133 SF A. Bertram Chandler Space Mercenaries / Emil Petaja The Caves of Mars (1965)
- M-135 SF Philip E. High The Mad Metropolis / Murray Leinster Space Captain (1966)
- M-139 SF Samuel R. Delany Empire Star / Tom Purdom The Tree Lord of Imeton (1966)
- M-141 SF Jack Vance The Brains of Earth / The Many Worlds of Magnus Ridolph (1966)

== G Series ==
- G-574 SF Avram Davidson The Kar-Chee Reign / Ursula K. Le Guin Rocannon's World (1966)
- G-576 SF John T. Phillifent (as John Rackham) Danger From Vega / Avram Davidson Clash of Star-Kings (1966)
- G-580 SF Mack Reynolds Dawnman Planet / Claude Nunes Inherit the Earth (1966)
- G-585 SF John W. Campbell The Planeteers / The Ultimate Weapon (1966)
- G-588 SF Lin Carter The Star Magicians / John Baxter The Off-Worlders (1966)
- G-592 SF John T. Phillifent (as John Rackham) The Beasts of Kohl / John Brunner A Planet Of Your Own (1966)
- G-597 SF Ursula K. Le Guin Planet of Exile / Thomas M. Disch Mankind Under the Leash (1966)
- G-602 SF Jack Jardine and Julie Jardine (jointly as Howard L. Cory) The Mind Monsters / Philip K. Dick The Unteleported Man (1966)
- G-606 SF John T. Phillifent (as John Rackham) Time to Live / Lin Carter The Man Without a Planet (1966)
- G-609 SF Philip E. High Reality Forbidden / A. Bertram Chandler Contraband From Otherspace (1967)
- G-614 SF Walt Richmond and Leigh Richmond Shock Wave / Frederick L. Shaw, Jr. Envoy to the Dog Star (1967)
- G-618 SF Emil Petaja The Stolen Sun / H. Warner Munn The Ship From Atlantis (1967)
- G-623 SF Philip E. High These Savage Futurians / John T. Phillifent (as John Rackham) The Double Invaders (1967)
- G-632 SF A. Bertram Chandler Nebula Alert / Mack Reynolds The Rival Rigelians (1967)

== H Series ==
- H-20 SF Kenneth Bulmer The Key to Irunium / Alan Schwartz The Wandering Tellurian (1967)
- H-21 SF Jack Vance The Last Castle / Tony Russell Wayman World Of The Sleeper (1967)
- H-22 SF Tom Purdom Five Against Arlane / Emil Petaja Lord of the Green Planet (1967)
- H-27 SF Juanita Coulson Crisis on Cheiron / E. C. Tubb The Winds of Gath (1967)
- H-29 SF Walt Richmond and Leigh Richmond The Lost Millennium / A. Bertram Chandler The Road to the Rim (1967)
- H-34 SF Mack Reynolds Computer War / E. C. Tubb Death is a Dream (1967)
- H-36 SF Emil Petaja Tramontane / Michael Moorcock The Wrecks Of Time (1967)
- H-40 SF E. C. Tubb C.O.D. Mars / John T. Phillifent (as John Rackham) Alien Sea (1968)
- H-48 SF Ellen Wobig The Youth Monopoly / Lan Wright The Pictures Of Pavanne (1968)
- H-51 SF John M. Faucette Crown Of Infinity / Emil Petaja The Prism (1968)
- H-56 SF Ernest Hill Pity About Earth / R. A. Lafferty Space Chantey (1968)
- H-59 SF Philip E. High The Time Mercenaries / Louis Trimble Anthropol (1968)
- H-65 SF Mack Reynolds Mercenary From Tomorrow / Kenneth Bulmer The Key to Venudine (1968)
- H-70 SF Dean R. Koontz Star Quest / Emil Petaja Doom of the Green Planet (1968)
- H-77 SF Juanita Coulson The Singing Stones / E. C. Tubb Derai (1968)
- H-85 SF Philip E. High Invader on My Back / Donald A. Wollheim (as David Grinnell) and Lin Carter Destination: Saturn (1968)
- H-91 SF Laurence M. Janifer and S.J. Treibich Target Terra / John Rackham The Proxima Project (1968)
- H-95 SF Clifford D. Simak So Bright the Vision / Jeff Sutton The Man Who Saw Tomorrow (1968)
- H-103 SF Mack Reynolds Code Duello / John M. Faucette The Age of Ruin (1968)

== Numbered Series ==
- 22600 SF Dean R. Koontz The Fall Of The Dream Machine / Kenneth Bulmer The Star Venturers (January 1969)
- 72400 SF A. Bertram Chandler The Rim Gods / Laurence M. Janifer The High Hex (February 1969)
- 30300 SF Fritz Leiber The Green Millennium / Night Monsters (March 1969)
- 37250 SF Marion Zimmer Bradley The Brass Dragon / John T. Phillifent (as John Rackham) Ipomoea (April 1969)
- 23140 SF Dean R. Koontz Fear That Man / E. C. Tubb Toyman (May 1969)
- 77710 SF Robert Lory The Eyes Of Bolsk / Mack Reynolds The Space Barbarians (June 1969)
- 81680 SF John Jakes Tonight We Steal The Stars / Laurence M. Janifer and S. J. Treibich The Wagered World (July 1969)
- 12140 SF Brian M. Stableford Cradle of the Sun / Kenneth Bulmer The Wizards of Senchuria (August 1969)
- 42800 SF E. C. Tubb Kalin/ Alex Dain The Bane of Kanthos (September 1969)
- 23775 SF Barry N. Malzberg (as K.M. O'Donnell) Final War and Other Fantasies / John Rackham Treasure of Tau Ceti (October 1969)
- 42900 SF Lin Carter Tower Of The Medusa / George H. Smith Kar Kaballa (November 1969)
- 66160 SF Nick Kamin Earthrim / Walt Richmond and Leigh Richmond Phoenix Ship (December 1969)
- 89250 SF Marion Zimmer Bradley The Winds Of Darkover / John Rackham The Anything Tree (January 1970)
- 06707 SF Brian M. Stableford The Blind Worm / Emil Petaja Seed of the Dreamers (February 1970)
- 81610 SF Donald A. Wollheim (as David Grinnell) To Venus! To Venus! / E. C. Tubb The Jester at Scar (March 1970)
- 27235 SF Walt Richmond and Leigh Richmond Gallaghers Glacier / Positive Charge (April 1970)
- 24100 SF John T. Phillifent (as John Rackham) Flower of Doradil / Thomas Edward Renn (as Jeremy Strike) A Promising Planet (May 1970)
- 76096 SF Jeff Sutton Alton's Unguessable / Kenneth Bulmer The Ships of Durostorum (June 1970)
- 52180 SF Robert Lory A Harvest Of Hoodwinks / Masters Of The Lamp (July 1970)
- 78400 SF John Jakes Mask of Chaos / Barrington Bayley The Star Virus (August 1970)
- 51375 SF Philip José Farmer The Mad Goblin / Philip José Farmer Lord of the Trees (September 1970)
- 11560 SF Suzette Haden Elgin The Communipaths / Louis Trimble The Noblest Experiment In The Galaxy (October 1970)
- 13793 SF Dean R. Koontz Soft Come the Dragons / Dark of the Woods (November 1970)
- 27400 SF Neal Barrett, Jr. The Gates of Time / Barry N. Malzberg (as K.M. O'Donnell) Dwellers of the Deep (December 1970)
- 58880 SF Sam Lundwall Alice's World / No Time For Heroes (January 1971)
- 05595 SF Kenneth Bulmer Electric Sword Swallowers / John T. Phillifent (as John Rackham) Beyond Capella (February 1971)
- 11182 SF Ron Goulart Clockwork Pirates / Ghost Breaker (March 1971)
- 71082 SF Claudia Nunes and Rhoda Nunes Recoil / E. C. Tubb Lallia (April 1971)
- 13783 SF A. Bertram Chandler The Dark Dimensions / Alternate Orbits (May 1971)
- 13805 SF John T. Phillifent (as John Rackham) Dark Planet / Robert J. Antonick (as Nick Kamin) The Herod Men (June 1971)
- 77785 SF Eric Frank Russell Six Worlds Yonder 6 unrelated stories. / The Space Willies A spoof on Scientology. (July 1971)
- 68310 SF John Glasby Project Jove / Kenneth Bulmer The Hunters of Jundagai (August 1971)
- 27415 SF Barry N. Malzberg (as K.M. O'Donnell) Gather in the Hall of Planets / In the Pocket and Other S-F Stories (September 1971)
- 66525 SF Murray Leinster The Mutant Weapon / Pirates of Zan (October 1971)
- 75781 SF Leigh Brackett The Secret of Sinharat / Leigh Brackett People of the Talisman (November 1971)
- 77525 SF Jack Vance Son of the Tree / The Houses of Iszm (December 1971)
- 33710 SF Neal Barrett Jr. Highwood / Barrington Bayley Annihilation Factor (January 1972)
- 15890 SF A. Bertram Chandler Rendezvous On A Lost World / Marion Zimmer Bradley The Door Through Space (February 1972)
- 79975 SF E. C. Tubb Technos / E. C. Tubb A Scatter of Stardust (March 1972)
- 16640 SF Jack Vance The Dragon Masters / 5 Gold Bands (April 1972)
- 00990 SF Susan K. Putney Against Arcturus / Dean R. Koontz Time Thieves (May 1972)
- 37062 SF A. Bertram Chandler The Inheritors / The Gateway to Never (June 1972)
- 10293 SF John T. Phillifent (as John Rackham) Earthstrings / Ken Bulmer The Chariots of Ra (July 1972)
- 06612 SF Mack Reynolds Blackman's Burden / Border, Breed Nor Birth (August 1972)
- 15697 SF Philip K. Dick The Unteleported Man / Dr. Futurity (September 1972)
- 31755 SF A. Bertram Chandler The Hard Way Up / Robert Lory The Veiled World (October 1972)
- 11451 SF A. Bertram Chandler Coils of Time / Into The Alternate Universe (November 1972)
- 22576 SF Marion Zimmer Bradley Falcons of Narabedla / The Dark Intruder & Other Stories (December 1972)
- 76960 SF Lester del Rey Badge of Infamy / The Sky is Falling (January 1973)
- 11650 SF Mack Reynolds Computer War / Code Duello (February 1973)
- 93900 SF Ross Rocklynne The Sun Destroyers / Edmond Hamilton A Yank at Valhalla (March 1973)
- 16641 SF Jack Vance The Dragon Masters / The Last Castle (April 1973)
- 53415 SF John T. Phillifent Hierarchies / Doris Piserchia Mister Justice (May 1973)
- 76380 SF William F. Temple Battle on Venus / William F. Temple The Three Suns of Amara (June 1973)
- 89301 SF E. C. Tubb Derai / The Winds of Gath (July 1973)
- 48245 SF John T. Phillifent Life With Lancelot / William Barton Hunting on Kunderer (August 1973)

Serial number 48245, above, was the last Ace Double published in the tête-bêche format. The remainder of the books listed in this section contain two novels, but are published in the traditional way with a single cover and the text the same way up throughout the book. Another Ace SF double(G-723-Andre Norton-Star Hunter/Voodoo Planet) was published in 1968 as a traditional reprint in the second G series (begun in 1964). G-723 was the only traditionally printed SF double included in that series and thus does not fit under any of the categories listed here.

- 66995 SF Mack Reynolds The Rival Rigelians / Planetary Agent X (June 1974)
- 14250 SF Mack Reynolds Depression Or Bust / Dawnman Planet (September 1974)
- 20571 SF Samuel R. Delany The Ballad of Beta-2 / Empire Star (October 1975)
- 24035 SF Mack Reynolds The Five Way Secret Agent / Mercenary from Tomorrow (November 1974)

The remaining novels do not have complete date information, so they are sorted in numerical order of the serial number. Note that the following are also not in tête-bêche format.

- 01685 SF Gordon R. Dickson Alien Art / Arcturus Landing (June 1981)
- 11555 SF A. Bertram Chandler The Commodore at Sea / Spartan Planet (June 1979)
- 11556 SF A. Bertram Chandler The Commodore at Sea / Spartan Planet (September 1981; same cover as 11555-1)
- 11705 SF Robert Silverberg Conquerors From the Darkness / Master of Life and Death (July 1979)
- 24890 SF H. Beam Piper Four-Day Planet / Lone Star Planet (April 1979)
- 24892 SF H. Beam Piper Four-Day Planet / H. Beam Piper and John J. McGuire Lone Star Planet (September 1984)
- 37063 SF A. Bertram Chandler The Inheritors / The Gateway to Never (June 1978)
- 37064 SF A. Bertram Chandler The Inheritors / The Gateway to Never (September 1981)
- 37108 SF A. Bertram Chandler Into the Alternate Universe / Contraband From Otherspace (March 1979)
- 37109 SF A. Bertram Chandler Into the Alternate Universe / Contraband From Otherspace (September 1981)
- 37130 SF Robert Silverberg Invaders From Earth / To Worlds Beyond (July 1980)
- 37365 SF Robert E. Howard The Iron Man / The Adventures of Dennis Dorgan
- 49252 SF Philip José Farmer Lord of the Trees / The Mad Goblin (May 1980)
- 65874 SF Robert Sheckley The People Trap / Mindswap (August 1981)
- 66093 SF Walter Ernsting (as Clark Darlton) Perry Rhodan 109 The Stolen Spacefleet / Klaus Mahn (as Kurt Mahr) Perry Rhodan 110 Sgt. Robot
- 66094 SF Willi Voltz (as William Voltz) Perry Rhodan 111 Seeds of Ruin / K. H. Scheer Perry Rhodan 112 Planet Mechanica
- 66095 SF Walter Ernsting (as Clark Darlton) Perry Rhodan 113 Heritage of the Lizard People / Klaus Mahn (as Kurt Mahr) Perry Rhodan 114 Death's Demand
- 66096 SF Kurt Brand Perry Rhodan 115 Saboteurs in A-1 / Willi Voltz (as William Voltz) Perry Rhodan 116 The Psycho Duel
- 66097 SF K. H. Scheer Perry Rhodan 117 Savior of the Empire / Walter Ernsting (as Clark Darlton) Perry Rhodan 118 The Shadows Attack
- 66098 SF Winfried Scholz (as W.W. Shols) Perry Rhodan The Wasp Men Attack / Ernst Vlcek Atlan #1: Spider Desert
- 66099 SF Klaus Mahn (as Kurt Mahr) Perry Rhodan Menace of Atomigeddon / Walter Ernsting (as Clark Darlton) Atlan #2: Flight from Tarkihl
- 66121 SF Winfried Scholz (as W.W. Shols) Perry Rhodan Robot Threat: New York / Hanns Kneifel (as Hans Kneifel) Atlan #3: Pale Country Pursuit
- 66128 SF K. H. Scheer Perry Rhodan Atlan #4: The Crystal Prince / Walter Ernsting (as Clark Darlton) Atlan #5: War of the Ghosts
- 67021 SF Marion Zimmer BradleyThe Planet Savers / The Sword of Aldones (April 1980)
- 67025 SF Marion Zimmer BradleyThe Planet Savers / The Sword of Aldones (1983)
- 67026 SF Marion Zimmer BradleyThe Planet Savers / The Sword of Aldones (August 1985)
- 67027 SF Marion Zimmer BradleyThe Planet Savers / The Sword of Aldones (1987)
- 72401 SF A. Bertram Chandler The Rim Gods / The Dark Dimension (August 1978)
- 72402 SF A. Bertram Chandler The Rim of Space / The Ship From Outside (November 1979)
- 72403 SF A. Bertram Chandler The Rim Gods / The Dark Dimension (September 1981)
- 73100 SF A. Bertram Chandler The Road to the Rim / The Hard Way Up (April 1978)
- 73101 SF A. Bertram Chandler The Road to the Rim / The Hard Way Up (1979)
- 73102 SF A. Bertram Chandler The Road to the Rim / The Hard Way Up (September 1981)
- 73390 SF Avram Davidson Rogue Dragon / The Kar-Chee Reign (March 1979)
- 78537 SF Robert Sheckley The Status Civilization / Notions: Unlimited (November 1979)
- 81237 SF Gordon R. Dickson Time to Teleport / Delusion World (July 1981)
- 86495 SF L. Sprague de Camp The Tower of Zanid / The Virgin of Zesh (February 1983)
