= A Thousand Suns (disambiguation) =

A Thousand Suns is a 2010 studio album by American rock band Linkin Park. A Thousand Suns may also refer to:

- A verse from the Bhagavad Gita (XI,12), quoted by physicist J. Robert Oppenheimer in describing the atomic bomb
- A Thousand Suns World Tour, Linkin Park tour in support of the album
- A Thousand Suns (Russell Morris album), 1991
- "A Thousand Suns" (Criminal Minds), a 2014 television episode
- A Thousand Suns, 2004 book by yoga author Linda Johnsen

== See also ==
- A Thousand Sons, 2010 installment of the Warhammer 40,000 science fantasy series The Horus Heresy
- A Thousand Splendid Suns, 2007 novel by Afghan-American author Khaled Hosseini
  - A Thousand Splendid Suns (opera), with music by American composer Sheila Silver, based on the novel
- The Meeting of a Thousand Suns, 2010 Linkin Park DVD
- City of a Thousand Suns, 1965 science fantasy novel by Samuel R. Delany
- In the Shadow of a Thousand Suns, 2008 album by American black metal band Abigail Williams
- Fire of a Thousand Suns, 1995 book by Hiroshima atomic bombing crew member George R. Caron
- Brighter than a Thousand Suns (disambiguation)
