= Essex House =

Essex House can refer to:

== Buildings ==
- Essex House (London), a demolished historic house in London
- JW Marriott Essex House, a luxury hotel in New York City
- a building at the University of Sussex

== Other uses ==
- Essex House (publisher), a Los Angeles publishing imprint
