= Destination: Saturn =

1967 novel by Donald A. Wollheim and Lin Carter

- Cover from first edition
- Author: David Grinnell and Lin Carter
- Cover artist: Michael M. Peters
- Language: English
- Series: Ajax Calkins
- Genre: Science fiction
- Publisher: Avalon Books
- Publication date: 1967
- Publication place: United States
- Media type: Print (hardcover)
- Pages: 192
- OCLC: 3115091
- LC Class: PZ2001.B897
- Preceded by: Destiny's Orbit

Destination: Saturn is a science fiction novel by American writers Donald A. Wollheim (writing as David Grinnell) and Lin Carter, as part of the former's Ajax Calkins series. It was first published in hardcover by Avalon Books in 1967, and reissued in paperback by Ace Books in 1968 together with the unrelated Philip E. High novel Invader on My Back as the "Ace Double" anthology, Invader on My Back/Destination: Saturn.

== Plot summary ==
Ajax Calkins has bought an asteroid and declared himself its king, only to find his new realm of Ajaxia is actually a relict spaceship from the destroyed planet that once orbited between Mars and Jupiter, whose remnants form the asteroid belt. Currently on Earth with his fiancée Emily Hackenschmidt, he has left Ajaxia in the keeping of his friend, the spider-like Martian Wuj. But Earth's enemies, the blob-like shape-shifters of Saturn, have designs on the ship and its super-scientific secrets. Emulating the forms of Ajax and Emily, they dupe Wuj and abscond with it towards Saturn. It's up to the real Ajax and Emily to pursue, regain their prize and save the day.

== Reception ==
Victoria Silverwolf at Galactic Journey calls the book "a light-hearted space opera ... written in a dryly tongue-in-cheek style that is more amusing than the usual science fiction farce." She characterizes the protagonist as "something of a fool," who "[t]he more levelheaded Emily is often exasperated at," and "with good reason."

Robert M. Price calls the novel "a riot as well as a page-turner."
