= The Fall of the Towers =

Trilogy of science fantasy books by Samuel R. Delany

- Covers of first omnibus edition
- Author: Samuel R. Delany
- Cover artist: Kelly Freas
- Language: English
- Genre: Science fantasy
- Publisher: Ace Books
- Publication date: 1970
- Publication place: United States
- Media type: Print (Paperback)
- Pages: 413 pp
- OCLC: 425974

The Fall of the Towers is a trilogy of science fantasy books by American writer Samuel R. Delany.

First published in omnibus form in 1970, the trilogy was originally published individually as Captives of the Flame (1963, rewritten as Out of the Dead City in 1968), The Towers of Toron (1964), and City of a Thousand Suns (1965). The first two books were somewhat rewritten for the omnibus edition. Delany describes the extent of the rewriting in a final note in the one-volume text.

The stories of the Fall of the Towers trilogy were originally set in the same post-holocaust Earth as Delany's earlier The Jewels of Aptor; however, linking references were removed in later revised editions.

== Contents ==
- Notes on Revision - essay by Samuel R. Delany
- Prologue - essay by Samuel R. Delany
- Out of the Dead City (1966) (aka Captives of the Flame, 1963)
- The Towers of Toron (1964)
- City of a Thousand Suns (1965)
- Epilogue (1964) - essay by Samuel R. Delany
- Afterword (1964) - essay by Samuel R. Delany

== Plot ==
The trilogy follows the journey of Jon Koshar, a man who awakens to find himself in a new world and sets out on a quest to uncover the secrets of the mysterious Towers that dominate the landscape. Along the way, he meets mutants and telepaths who help him navigate a dangerous political landscape and overthrow the ruling elite. The fate of the world hangs in the balance as they fight to bring about a better future for all.

== Sources ==
- Barbour, Douglas (1979). Worlds Out Of Worlds: The SF Novels of Samuel R. Delany. Frome, Somerset, UK: Bran's Head Books Ltd. ISBN 0-905220-13-7.
- Clute, John; Nicholls, Peter (1995). The Encyclopedia of Science Fiction (2 ed.). New York: St. Martin's Griffin. ISBN 0-312-13486-X.
- Tuck, Donald H. (1974). The Encyclopedia of Science Fiction and Fantasy. Chicago: Advent. ISBN 0-911682-20-1.
