= Image of the Beast =

Image of the Beast may refer to:

- Image of the Beast (antichrist), an image associated with the Beast of Revelation
- Image of the Beast (novel), a 1968 novel by Philip José Farmer
- Image of the Beast (film), a 1981 American film
