= The Towers of Toron =

1964 novel by Samuel R. Delany

- Cover of first edition paperback
- Author: Samuel R. Delany
- Cover artist: Ed Emshwiller
- Language: English
- Series: The Fall of the Towers
- Genre: Science Fantasy
- Publisher: Ace Books
- Publication date: 1964
- Publication place: United States
- Media type: Print (Paperback)
- Pages: 140 pp
- OCLC: 2183859
- Preceded by: Captives of the Flame
- Followed by: City of a Thousand Suns

The Towers of Toron is a 1964 science fantasy novel by Samuel R. Delany, and is the second novel in the "Fall of the Towers" trilogy. The novel was originally published as Ace Double F-261, together with The Lunar Eye by Robert Moore Williams.

The stories of the Fall of the Towers trilogy were originally set in the same post-holocaust Earth as Delany's earlier The Jewels of Aptor; however, linking references were removed in later revised editions.

== Sources ==
- Barbour, Douglas (1979). Worlds Out Of Worlds: The SF Novels of Samuel R. Delany. Frome, Somerset, UK: Bran's Head Books Ltd. ISBN 0-905220-13-7.
- Clute, John; Nicholls, Peter (1995). The Encyclopedia of Science Fiction (2 ed.). New York: St. Martin's Griffin. ISBN 0-312-13486-X.
- Tuck, Donald H. (1974). The Encyclopedia of Science Fiction and Fantasy. Chicago: Advent. ISBN 0-911682-20-1.
