= Rocket to Limbo =

1957 novel by Alan E. Nourse

- First edition cover
- Author: Alan E. Nourse
- Cover artist: Frank Kramer
- Language: English
- Genre: science-fiction novel
- Published: 1957 (David McKay Co., Inc.)
- Publication place: United States of America
- Media type: Print (paperback)
- Pages: 198 pp (hardback edition)

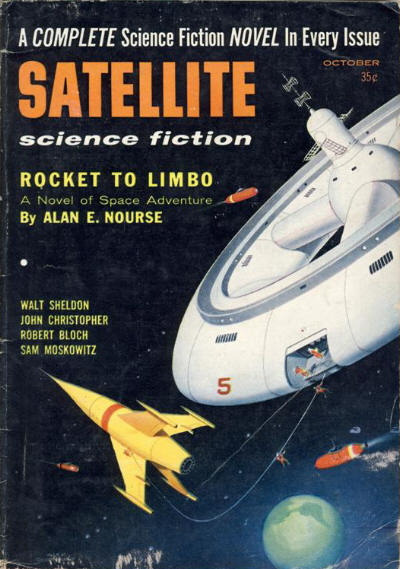
Rocket to Limbo was originally published in the October 1957 issue of Satellite Science Fiction

Rocket to Limbo is a 1957 science fiction novel by Alan E. Nourse. It was first published in book form by David McKay Co., Inc, and was later incorporated into an Ace Double (with Echo in the Skull, by John Brunner). It first appeared in the October 1957 issue of Satellite Science Fiction.

== Plot ==
On the afternoon of 3 March 2008, the Star Ship Argonaut lifted off from Earth and set course on the Long Passage to Alpha Centauri. The builders intended that the crew establish a colony on one of Alpha Centauri's planets and then bring Argonaut back to Earth. The ship never returned and no trace of her was ever found.

In the year 2351 Lars Heldrigsson joined the crew of the Star Ship Ganymede, scheduled to fly to Vega III. Once the ship entered space, Lars and the other 21 crewmen discovered that the ship was actually going to the planet Wolf IV to search for the lost Star Ship Planetfall. This unprecedented change of plan was made more disturbing by the presence of fusion bombs in the ship's hold. Angry at being effectively shanghaied onto a dangerous mission, some of the crew attempted to take control the ship. The mutiny failed and, threatened with abandonment in interstellar space, the mutineers agreed to continue on the mission.

Wolf IV was a cold, gray, cloud-covered planet. On arrival, a scout spotted what appeared to be the wreckage of the Planetfall lying on a mountainside, and also caught a glimpse of what he took to be a city in a valley beyond the mountains. The crew landed Ganymede on a river delta 75 miles from the wreck, and landing parties went out to familiarize themselves with the environment. At night the mutineers sabotaged the communications equipment and returned to the ship. Lars discovered the betrayal and he and other crewmen pursued the mutineers, but when they got back to the delta the ship had vanished, though no one heard or saw it blast off.

With no other option available to them, the men made the arduous climb to the wreck, hoping to find food, generators to recharge the batteries in their heater suits, and possibly a means of communicating with Earth. But the wreck is not the Planetfall, it is the Argonaut. The men's last, faint hope was to find the city that the scout thought he saw in the next valley.

The men trudged onward, over the pass, and down into the valley. The fog lifted and the men saw a three-dimensional kaleidoscope, filled with people, floating several hundred feet above a meadow. Lars was taken into the city where he met Peter Bingham, Ganymede's other Officer-in-Training. Lars and Peter were treated as honored guests by the City-people, who possessed telekinetic powers (which they call teledynamics), the ability to change the forms of matter and energy by thought. Meanwhile, Planetfall and Ganymede were being kept in storage, with their crews in state of deep sleep.

The City-people subjected Lars and Peter to some kind of training but were unable to explain what it was meant to accomplish. They eventually discovered that they were being trained to develop their own teledynamic abilities, and that the training succeeded. The City-people, descendants of the babies that aliens found in the wreck of the Argonaut, then freed the other men and allowed them to take their ships back to Earth, with Lars and Peter as ambassadors of a new order of reality.

The breaking of the plot deadlock - by having Lars and Peter develop the latent psychic powers that the City-people had been nurturing in them - resembles a similar breaking of a plot deadlock found in The Angry Espers by Lloyd Biggle, Jr., in which an Earthman stranded on a strange planet must develop his latent psychic abilities in order to deal with the beings around him.

== Publication history ==
- 1957, USA, David McKay, OCLC #586602, Hardback (198 pp).
- 1957, USA, Renown Publications, Inc., Satellite Science Fiction (Oct 1957), digest (132 pp).
- 1959, USA, Ace Books (Ace Double #D-385), Pub date Sep 1959, Paperback (162 pp).
- 1961, Spain, Editorial Cenit (#9), Madrid, as El Planeta Gris (The Gray Planet).
- 1964, UK, Faber & Faber (London), (174 pp)
- 1964, Germany, Arthur Moewig Verlag (Munich)(Terra Sonderband #89), 172 pp, as Phantom-City.
- 1986, USA, Ace Books, ISBN 0-441-73339-5, Pub date Oct 1986, Paperback (185 pp).

== Reviews ==
The book was reviewed by

- S. E. Cotts at Amazing Science Fiction Stories (Jan 1960)
- Frederik Pohl at If (Mar 1960)
- P. Schuyler Miller at Astounding/Analog Science Fact & Fiction (Jun 1960)
- Floyd C. Gale at Galaxy Science Fiction (August 1960)
- Patricia Altner at Fantasy Review (Dec 1986)

== Listings ==
The book is listed at

- The Library of Congress as 57012177
- The British Library as UIN = BLL01002679137
