= R. DeWitt Miller =

American novelist

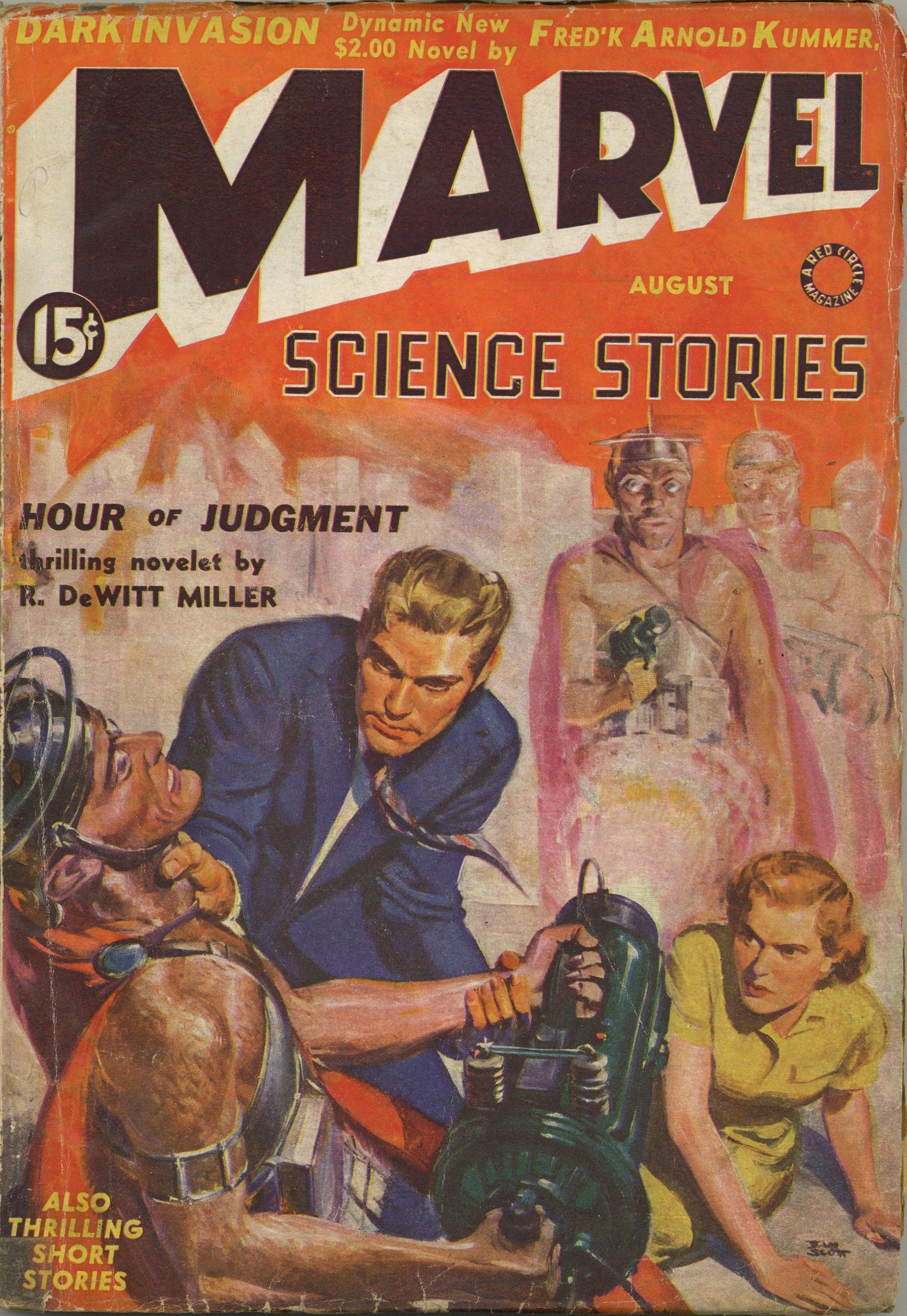
Miller's novelette "Hour of Judgment" was the cover story for the August 1939 issue of Marvel Science Stories

Richard DeWitt Miller (January 22, 1910 – June 3, 1958) was an American writer of science fiction and Forteana. His first science-fiction publication was "The Shapes" which appeared in Astounding Science Fiction in 1936. His non-fiction books include You Do Take It With You (1936) (a book about Fortean phenomena) as well as The Mastery of the Master (1944), Impossible - Yet It Happened (also known as Forgotten Mysteries: True Stories of the Supernatural, 1947), Stranger Than Life (1955), You Do Take It with You: An Adventure into the Vaster Reality (1955), and Reincarnation: The Whole Startling Story (1956). Miller wrote one science-fiction novelette published in March 1938 by Astounding Science Fiction under the title "The Master Shall Not Die" with no collaborator; it was not issued in book form until 1956, when Ace Books brought it out in its dos-à-dos format Ace Doubles under the title The Man Who Lived Forever, with co-author Anna Hunger. The book was bound back-to-back with Jerry Sohl's The Mars Monopoly. Miller also authored a fantasy work entitled The Loose Board in the Floor (1951).
