= Michael Perkins (poet) =

American poet (born 1942)

- Born: Michael Perkins; November 3, 1942; Lansing, Michigan, US
- Occupation: Poet
- Writing career
- Genres: Fiction, literary criticism, essays

Michael Perkins (born November 3, 1942) is an American poet.

== Life and work ==
Michael Perkins grew up in Portsmouth and Dayton, Ohio. His family was from Eastern Kentucky, of Welsh and Cherokee lineage. He graduated from Ohio University, Athens, 1963 after studies at The New School. At 16 he sent poems to Evergreen Review, and received encouragement from editor Irving Rosenthal, author of Sheeper and editor of Big Table magazine.

Perkins lived in the East Village, Manhattan from 1963 to 1969, working as a bookstore owner, caseworker, and remedial reading teacher. He became editor of Tompkins Square Press, wrote for The Village Voice, and published in little magazines. He associated with Samuel R. Delany, Andrei Codrescu, Thomas M. Disch, John Wieners, Rene Ricard, Ira Cohen, Ray and Bonnie Bremser.

His wife, the painter Renie Perkins, committed suicide in 1968, leaving two children. He traveled in Europe with them in 1969–70. He began writing erotic novels for Essex House in California, along with David Meltzer and Philip José Farmer. Perkins' book Evil Companions caused a sensation when it appeared in 1968, and was described by Samuel R. Delany in his introduction to the 1991 edition as "an astonishing, rich and fascinating classic".

He became editor of Croton Press, backed by his friend Harold M. Wit, and also worked as an editor for Maurice Girodias, Richard Kasak, and Al Goldstein. (About The Secret Record, Gay Talese wrote, "Some of the most interesting and perceptive literary criticism in recent years has been done by Michael Perkins.") He was associated with philosopher John Brockman in the late sixties, and close friends with Edward Dahlberg.

Perkins's poetry is distinguished by a resolute adherence to the forms and themes of the great tradition of English and American poetry. About Carpe Diem: New and Selected Poems, Henry Weinfield wrote in Notre Dame Review, "Michael Perkins writes with clarity, precision, directness, and with a quiet simplicity and sense of rectitude that are increasingly rare in contemporary poetry."

Perkins was a close friend of the poet William Bronk from 1975 until the latter's death in 1999.

In 1973 he moved to Woodstock, New York, where he worked as a program director for local arts organisations, and as a freelance writer. As program director of the Woodstock Guild, he presented (with John Baker, editor of Publishers Weekly) five major conferences on American publishing. In Woodstock he was associated with photographer Charles Gatewood, and painter William Pachner. He became an avid hiker, writing (with Will Nixon) "Walking Woodstock". In 1986, he walked across Connecticut in a week.

== Criticism ==
- The Secret Record: Modern Erotic Literature, William Morrow, New York 1976.
- The Good Parts, Richard Kasak, New York, 1992

== Essays ==
- "Walking Woodstock: Journeys into the Wild Heart of America's Most Famous Small Town". (With Will Nixon) Bushwhack Books, Woodstock, New York, 2009.

== Aphorisms ==
- Life Sentences: Aphorisms and Reflections, Bushwhack Books, 2012.

== Poetry collections ==
- The Blue Woman and Other Poems, PN Press, 1966.
- The Persistence of Desire, The Cymric Press, 1977.
- Praise in the Ears of Clouds, R. Mutt, 1982.
- I Could Walk All Day, R. Mutt, 2002.
- Closer to the Bone: Poems Early and Late, R. Mutt, 2007.
- Carpe Diem: New and Selected Poems, Bushwhack Books, 2011.

== Selected novels ==
- Down Here, Essex House, Los Angeles, 1968.
- Evil Companions, Constable & Robinson, London 2012. Introduction by Samuel R. Delany.
- Dark Matter Constable & Robinson, London 2012.
- Burn, Constable & Robinson, 2012.
