= Sold - For a Spaceship =

1973 novel by Philip E. High

Cover of the first edition, published by Robert Hale.

Sold - For a Spaceship is a science fiction novel by British writer Philip E. High, published in 1973.

== Plot summary ==
In the novel, the despairing remains of the human race swiftly improve until mankind has mastered the universe.

== Reception ==
Dave Langford reviewed Sold - For a Spaceship for White Dwarf #72, and stated that "High has qualities of excitement and compassion which make his work stand out in this series (if nowhere else)."

== Reviews ==
- Review by Chris Morgan (1985) in Fantasy Review, November 1985
