= A Feast Unknown =

1969 novel written by Philip José Farmer

- Cover of the first edition
- Author: Philip José Farmer
- Language: English
- Genre: Horror, erotica
- Publisher: Essex House
- Publication date: 1969
- Publication place: United States
- Media type: Print (Softcover)
- Pages: 286

A Feast Unknown is a novel written by American author Philip José Farmer. The novel is a pastiche of pulp fiction, erotica, and horror fiction. It was originally published in 1969. The book was followed by two sequels: Lord of the Trees and The Mad Goblin.

The book contains many elements in common with Farmer's Wold Newton family concept. However, there is some dispute as to whether it actually takes place in the same setting with Farmer's other Wold Newton fiction. In addition, the novel is infamous for its graphic depictions of sex and violence and especially the combination of the two.

== Plot summary ==
The two main characters are thinly veiled versions of two of Farmer's favorite characters, Tarzan and Doc Savage. Called "Lord Grandrith" and "Doc Caliban", respectively, the two are recognizable as the iconic characters, but still unique.

The two, half-brothers with the same father (the infamous Victorian era serial killer Jack the Ripper) share a horrible affliction thanks to the powerful elixir that gives them near-eternal life. At the start of the novel they have discovered that they can no longer engage in sexual activity except during acts of violence (their penises become erect only during an act of violence) and they ejaculate after taking lives. By the end of the novel, Grandrith and Caliban will have grappled with each other in the nude, punching, clawing and biting, each of them sporting massive erections.

The novel begins with Grandrith under attack by three parties: the Kenyan army, a group of Albanian mercenaries, and Doc Caliban who believes that Grandrith has killed Caliban's cousin and one true love. In addition, both Caliban and Grandrith have been summoned for their annual appearance before The Nine, a powerful group of near immortals, who have given them both the secret of immortality in return for their obedience.

However, Caliban and Grandrith ultimately find a common enemy among the Nine that is revealed to be controlling the world, and to have been manipulating their own lives, and indeed, the entire preceding battle between the two. The two iconic warriors vow to defeat the Nine together—that tale is told in the intertwining sequels, Lord of the Trees and The Mad Goblin.

== Publishing history ==
The original edition was published by Essex House in the United States in 1969. It was released only in paperback form, and saw limited release. As such, its readership was mostly confined to collectors of erotic horror fiction and those who enjoyed Farmer's previous work.

Another paperback edition was published in the United Kingdom by Quartet in 1975, featuring cover art by Patrick Woodroffe. A hardcover, limited to 200 copies signed by Farmer, along with a trade paperback limited to 800 copies, were released by Fokker D-LXIX Press in the U.S., also in 1975. Both featured cover art and interior illustrations by Richard Corben. Two paperback editions were published by Playboy Press in 1980 and 1983, and RhinoEros released a paperback edition in the U.S. in 1995. An excerpt from Feast appeared in the short story collection Jack The Knife under the title "My Father the Ripper". These publications allowed the book to gain more mainstream success.

The book was also published in languages other than English. The French edition was titled La Jungle Nue, roughly "The Nude Jungle." The Italian was titled Festa di morte, meaning "Feast of Dead Men". It was also published in Russian, as part of a collected edition of Farmer's works.

== Critical reception ==
In a postscript to several of the novel's editions, science fiction author Theodore Sturgeon says that the message A Feast Unknown is intended to send to the reader is that "ultimate sex combined with ultimate violence is ultimate absurdity." This is on par with the idea that Farmer intended the novel largely as satire of pulp fiction, deliberately exaggerated to the point of absurdity, as Sturgeon puts it. This fact was lost on both the original publisher, Essex House, who produced "quality porn" novels, and many reviewers, including one who condemned A Feast Unknown as "drivel" and "a worthless book".

== Connections to Wold Newton family ==
Tarzan and Doc Savage are primary components of Farmer's Wold Newton family and universe; indeed, their "biographies", Doc Savage: His Apocalyptic Life and Tarzan Alive are the cornerstones of the concept.

However, Farmer never explicates whether Caliban and Grandrith are, in fact, the same individuals as the Tarzan and Savage he writes about in his Wold Newton fiction. They share many similarities due to the fact they are based upon the same fictional characters, but they also share properties unique to Farmer, such as being relatives (half-brothers here, cousins in the Wold Newton universe) and gaining an elixir that grants long life and eternal youth.

At the same time, the Wold Newton versions do not have Jack the Ripper as their father, nor do they suffer, visibly, the sexual aberration that Grandrith and Caliban do. This has led to most classifying the book as neither explicitly within the Wold Newton universe, nor explicitly outside of it. Farmer himself said that the best route was to "let the reader decide", but Wold Newton fan and "scholar" Dennis E. Power has written three essays relating to the subject. He hypothesises that Grandrith and Caliban are in fact children bred by the Nine to duplicate and appear strikingly similar to Doc Savage and Tarzan, to fulfill an ancient destiny prophesied by "The Undying God", in fact the original Tarzan, who traveled to prehistory in Farmer's Time's Last Gift. By now immortal and unageing as well (through different means), he doesn't return, instead living out his life throughout history. Power surmises that he became numerous figures from history, myth, and legend, and the Nine bred Lord Grandrith specifically to live out the destiny as foretold by The Undying God, which was, of course, the story of Tarzan himself. He also claims that Lord Grandrith was the individual who did some of the deeds and participated in the adventures of "Tarzan", when these adventures clash too greatly with established Wold Newton continuity. Specifically, he argues that the lead character of the film version of Tarzan and the Valley of Gold, which differs greatly from the original literary version, was Grandrith.
