= List of Ace miscellaneous double titles =

Ace Books published 8 Ace doubles between 1952 and 1961 that did not fit the usual genre categories of its 1952 to 1978 Doubles series. All those miscellaneous volumes were published in the famous "dos-à-dos" binding (actually tête-bêche format), whose use continued to 1974.

== Genres and collectability ==
Ace published science fiction, mysteries, and westerns, as well as books in none of those genres. Collectors of its three main genres have found the Ace doubles an attractive set of books for the unusual appearance of the dos-à-dos format. Eight of the doubles, listed below, do not fit any one of the three genres.

Each listing gives a publication date; in all cases that is year of publication by Ace, with the given catalog number, not the earliest publication date of the contents. For more information about the history of these titles, see Ace Books, which includes a discussion of the serial numbering conventions used and an explanation of the letter-code system.

== D series ==
- D-013 NA Theodore S. Drachman Cry Plague! / Leslie Edgley The Judas Goat (1953)
- D-025 NA P. G. Wodehouse Quick Service / The Code of the Woosters(1953)
- D-026 NA Harold Acton and Lee Yi-Hsieh (translators) Love In A Junk And Other Exotic Tales / Charles Pettit The Impotent General (1953)
- D-035 NA Rae Loomis The Marina Street Girls / Jack Houston Open All Night (1953)
- D-050 NA Wilene Shaw The Mating Call / Ozro Grant The Bad 'Un (1954)
- D-182 NA Émile Zola Shame / Thérèse Raquin (1956)

== F series ==
- F-101 NA Joan Sargent Cruise Nurse / Margaret Howe Calling Dr. Merriman (1960)
- F-112 NA Jeanne Judson Barbara Ames – Private Secretary / Nell Marr Dean Ratzlaff (as Nell Marr Dean) Fashions For Carol (1961)
