= The Metallic Muse =

- First edition cover
- Author: Lloyd Biggle, Jr.
- Cover artist: Ed Nuckolls
- Language: English
- Genre: Science fiction
- Publisher: Doubleday Books
- Publication date: 1972
- Publication place: United States
- Pages: 228
- OCLC: 2780647

The Metallic Muse is a collection of science fiction stories by Lloyd Biggle, Jr., published in hardcover by Doubleday Books in 1972. It was reprinted in paperback by DAW Books in 1973.

== Contents ==
- "The Tunesmith" (If 1957)
- "Leading Man" (Galaxy 1957)
- "Spare the Rod" (Galaxy 1958)
- "Orphan of the Void" (Fantastic 1960)
- "Well of the Deep Wish" (If 1961)
- "In His Own Image" (F&SF 1968)
- "The Botticelli Horror" (Fantastic 1960)

"Orphan of the Void" was originally published as "The Man Who Wasn't Home."

== Reception ==
Theodore Sturgeon noted that Biggle's stories "are usually constructed around an idea or solution withheld until the punchline. . . . a valid technique, except where the reader gets to the punchline first."
