= The World Menders =

1971 novel by Lloyd Biggle

- First edition
- Author: Lloyd Biggle, Jr.
- Cover artist: Pat Steir
- Language: English
- Series: Interplanetary Relations Bureau
- Genre: science-fiction novel
- Published: 1971 (Doubleday)
- Publication place: United States of America
- Media type: Print (Hardback)
- Pages: 181 (Hardback edition)
- OCLC: 127837
- Preceded by: The Still, Small Voice of Trumpets
- Followed by: The King Who Wasn’t

The World Menders is a science fiction novel written by Lloyd Biggle, Jr. and published in 1971 by Doubleday. In the story Biggle explores the old aphorism about the road to Hell being paved with good intentions and he garnered for himself a nomination for a Locus Best Novel Award.

== Plot ==
Cedd Farrari and twenty-nine other members of his class at the Cultural Survey Academy are transferred, two years before their graduation, to the Interplanetary Relations Bureau. They are then taken to inhabited planets outside the Federation of Independent Worlds and left with the IPR teams already there. Farrari joins the IPR team on Branoff IV, where he uses his training to organize the data that the explorers and observers bring in pertaining to the native Branovians.

While examining a picture of a tapestry recently hung in the city of Scorv, capital of the medieval-like kingdom of Scorvif, Farrari discerns that the kru, the god-emperor of Scorvif, has died. Enthusiastically, the other occupants of the base prepare to observe the drama of succession in the opaque native society, the first that they have ever observed. Because he made the discovery, Farrari must go to Scorvif to be interviewed by field agents. Going in native disguise, he ends up working in a bakery in Scorv, one surreptitiously owned and operated by the IPR.

The bakery gets an order to provide a special cake for the new kru and Farrari is drafted to play the role of the apprentice who carries the cake while the baker presents it. Through a comedy of errors Farrari ends up presenting the cake himself and committing an act that makes him a legend in Scorv, an omen from the Gods, who have apparently granted the kru a long reign and eternal glory. Farrari’s later disappearance from the temple only cements his role in native folklore. After escaping from the temple, Farrari returns to the bakery and thence to the IPR base to be debriefed.

On his next field assignment Farrari must accompany Liano Kurne as her servant. Clairvoyant, she goes into the field as a shaman and has chosen Farrari to go with her. As the slave of a shaman, Farrari can observe the slave communities that Liano visits and he tries to discern the slaves’ culture. Then Farrari makes a mistake that gets him sent back to base and Liano gets a new slave. Some time later Liano disappears.

Farrari himself, still disguised as a slave, contrives to disappear and goes to live among the slaves. One night he meets a slave who turns out to be an IPR agent who calls himself Bran, an agent who disappeared years ago and was given up for dead. Working together, Bran and Farrari try to find ways to free the slaves, but nothing they do will get the slaves to stand up for themselves. The two Terrans conclude that the slaves adhere to a death cult and that they worship the people who abuse them. While attacking a unit of the kru’s cavalry, Bran is killed and Farrari wounded. Taken to a cave to be buried like any other slave, Farrari is rescued by Liano, who disappears again.

At loose ends and not wanting to return to base, Farrari manipulates the slaves into forming something resembling an army on the march. The slavedrivers and their families flee in panic and even the kru’s cavalry won’t attack the slaves. But the slaves absolutely won’t fight, so Farrari is at a loss as to what to do next. He decides to exploit the panic that he has sown by taking a loaf of bread to the kru. In the temple the kru and the priests are flabbergasted when they recognize him and even more astounded when he challenges the kru to ensure better treatment for the slaves. After leaving Scorv he sees a slavedriver disperse his army with a single word and he believes that his work is done.

Back at base Farrari soon discovers the mistake he made in believing that he could bring freedom to the slaves. He had already noticed that the slaves had no culture. Now he understands that the slaves are actually little more than animals, comparable, perhaps, to Australopithecus or Homo erectus on the human lineage. This is the first time that IPR has encountered a sub-human species on the verge of achieving sentience, so the scientists at the base and in the field intend to study the slaves intensely. Farrari and Liano go back into the field themselves, intending to try, ever so gently, to get the slaves to develop a simple culture.

== Publication history ==
- 1971, USA, Doubleday, Hardback (181 pp)
- 1971, USA, Condé Nast Publications, Inc., Analog Science Fiction/Science Fact (Feb, Mar, Apr 1971), Digest (180 pp).
- 1972, USA, DAW Books (#UQ1015), Pub date Jul 1972, Paperback (192 pp).
- 1972, Canada, DAW Books (#UQ1015), Pub date Jul 1972, Paperback (192 pp).
- 1972, Italy, Editrice Nord (Cosmo Collana de Fantascienza #21), Hardback (200 pp), as Gli Olz di Branoff IV (The Olz of Branoff IV).
- 1973, UK, The Elmfield Press (Morley, Yorkshire, England), #0-7057-0024-0, Hardback (205 pp).
- 1974, Germany, Pabel Verlag (Terra Taschenbuch #233), Paperback (140 pp), as Die Weltverbessrer (The Do-Gooders).
- 1974, France, OPTA (Galaxie-Bis #34), Pub date Jul 1974, Paperback (250 pp), as Les Réparateurs de Mondes (The Repairers of Worlds).
- 1975, Netherlands, Meulenhoff (M-SF #93), ISBN 90-290-0300-6, Paperback (231 pp), as Voorwaarts Slaven! (Forward, Slaves!).

== Reviews ==
The book was reviewed by

- Michael T. Shoemaker at The WSFA Journal #77 (June–July 1971)
- Theodore Sturgeon at Galaxy Science Fiction (UK, Jan-Feb 1973)
- Theodore Sturgeon at Galaxy Magazine (Jan-Feb 1973)

== Awards and nominations ==
The World Menders came in at 11th place for Best Science Fiction Novel in the 1972 Locus Awards.
