= Monument (novel) =

1974 novel by Lloyd Biggle, Jr.

- First edition
- Author: Lloyd Biggle, Jr.
- Cover artist: Gary Friedman
- Language: English
- Genre: Science Fiction
- Publisher: Doubleday
- Publication date: 1974
- Media type: Print

Monument is a science fiction novel written by Lloyd Biggle, Jr. and published in 1974.

Monument was based on a short story (novelette) of the same name published in Analog magazine in 1961. The novel was optioned in 1979 and was to be the premiere film of Spacefilms, but never materialized. The film was co-written by Biggle and Spacefilms founder John Flory. The novel is dedicated "To John, Bee and Jack Flory, who had a vision."

== Plot summary ==
An undistinguished spacer with little education named Cerne Obrien finds a cache of extremely valuable "retron crystals", but crashes on an idyllic planet before he can sell them. The planet has a single continent, inhabited by humans with a Polynesian culture. The natives live contented lives, hunting a sea creature called the koluf, which constitutes almost their entire diet. Obrien uses his surviving technology to rid the area of several dangerous animals, and eventually marries. The natives come to call him the "Langri", a title of deep respect.

Obrien lives a peaceful life, watching his descendants grow up, but as he ages, he begins worrying about the future. Unscrupulous developers would inevitably try to turn the planet into a resort and marginalize the natives. Obrien could handle them if they arrived soon, but he cannot live forever.

He has bright young people sent to him. He begins to teach them "the Plan". It is difficult to teach the non-technological natives all they need to know, as they have little concept of modern galactic society, but he manages it. His best pupil is a young man named Fornri.

Even as Obrien lies dying, a developer called Wembling arrives to illegally prospect for minerals. The people, led by Fornri, put the Plan into effect. They first capture Wembling and his men, and the crews of four scout ships sent to find Wembling. The Navy eventually arrives, and a treaty is signed recognizing the planet under the name Langri. The people of Langri fine the Federation for illegal landings and hire a law firm, as specified in the Plan.

Eventually Wembling realizes the planet's potential. He sees to it that the record of the treaty is lost and procures a charter to develop a tourist resort. The construction drives away most of the koluf, and the people begin to starve; they have lost the ability to digest "normal" food. The starving natives cannot get a court to stop Wembling; he has a seemingly valid charter.

Meanwhile, Wembling's niece Talitha and his hired (and fired) anthropologist Hort form a relationship. They discover Obrien's wrecked craft and read his log, including his notes on the Plan; they are amazed that one man could have created such a complete and detailed scheme, including Obrien's masterstroke. Sympathizing with the natives and fearing to interfere with the Plan, they keep their newfound knowledge to themselves.

In accordance with the Plan, the people have been secretly learning to read. After having achieved the required high literacy rate, they successfully petition for membership in the Galactic Federation. The Plan then enters its endgame: the duly formed planetary government imposes a tax rate of 1000%. Since the natives have few personal assets, they can easily afford to pay, but such an exorbitant rate would bankrupt Wembling. The developer is helpless: a government can impose any tax it wishes, as long as it is applied equally to all.

The new government plans to build schools, parks, and hospitals to benefit the people. In the short story, it even hires Wembling, admiring his ruthless energy, if not his morals. (In the novel, he departs in disgust after trying to offer the new government a deal on a hotel.)

== Differences between the novel and short story versions ==
- In the short story, there is a break of unspecified length between Obrien's death and the arrival of new space ships. Fornri does not appear in the section where Obrien does.
- In the short story, Wembling does not arrive on the initial exploring ship, but is appointed ambassador by the local Sector Governor after the first treaty has been signed. He is said to have "bothered" the native women, which is never suggested in the novel.
- Talitha Warr and Eric Hort do not appear in the short story at all—their role in the final scene is taken by the Navy admiral who negotiates the initial treaty.
- Fornri and Wembling are much more briefly drawn in the short story version. Fornri's uncertainty and romantic frustration are not mentioned. Indeed, no female characters of any significance appear in the short story version, while the novel features the paired romances of Fornri and Dalla, and Talitha and Hort.
- The Federation court system is not shown in the short story version; only its decisions are mentioned. No action occurs on any world but Langri.
