= Atta (novel) =

1953 novel by Francis Rufus Bellamy

- First edition
- Author: Francis Rufus Bellamy
- Language: English
- Genre: Science fiction novel
- Publisher: A. A. Wyn
- Publication date: 1953, 1954
- Publication place: United States
- Media type: Print (hardback & paperback)
- Pages: 216 pp

Atta: A Novel of a Most Extraordinary Adventure is a science fiction novel by Francis Rufus Bellamy published in 1953. In 1954 the novel was published back-to-back with Murray Leinster's The Brain Stealers as Ace Double D-079.

Atta is a Robinson Crusoe-like tale of a man who is hit by lightning and wakes up, to find himself half an inch tall. He befriends a talking warrior ant named Atta and has many adventures. At the end of the novel, Atta dies, and the man returns to normal size.

== Critical reception ==
Damon Knight wrote of the novel

Aside from the author's archaic narrative style and his relentless disregard of natural history, the principal irritant in this story is the hero's absolutely impenetrable stupidity...This book could only have been written by a man who thought his idea was brand new. If he had read a little science fiction, he might have been disabused of this and several other misconceptions; but doubtless he took the word of some respected critic that no worthwhile fantasy has been published since 1719.

P. Schuyler Miller found the novel unsuccessful, saying "as a satire on human society, it's rather fumbling. And if it's just a story, . . . it could be more skilfully told."
