= City of a Thousand Suns =

1965 novel by Samuel Delany

- Cover of first edition paperback
- Author: Samuel R. Delany
- Illustrator: Jack Gaughan
- Cover artist: Jack Gaughan
- Language: English
- Series: The Fall of the Towers
- Genre: Science fantasy novel
- Publisher: Ace Books
- Publication date: 1965
- Publication place: United States
- Media type: Print (Paperback)
- Pages: 156 pp
- OCLC: 1539300
- Preceded by: The Towers of Toron

City of a Thousand Suns is a 1965 science fantasy novel by American writer Samuel R. Delany, the final novel in the Fall of the Towers trilogy.

As in the other two books, the setting is the post-apocalyptic empire of Toromon, confined by a surrounding "Barrier" of highly-radioactive land, and inhabited by mutant/evolved "forest people" (some of whom are telepaths) and devolved "neanderthals", as well as normal humans. The events of the book focus on a claimed war. Soldiers are told repeatedly "we have an enemy behind the barrier" and placed in coffin-like modules to be teleported into enemy territory to do battle.

However, it turns out that the matter transporter or teleportation system has never worked, and the war is a hoax. The soldiers are wired into a computer prior to their "teleportation" experience but remain in their coffins. They hallucinate battles, with their experiences generated and coordinated by the computer. The predetermined fatalities are killed by an enemy energy weapon within the communal reality, as the survivors remember it, but in reality are electrocuted and burned within their coffins. In some respects, this foreshadows the 1999 film The Matrix.

However, Toromon does have a real enemy of sorts, on another plane of existence, and at the end of the book there is a cosmic conflict which leads to this entity being prevented from conducting further malicious experiments on Toromon.

The stories of the Fall of the Towers trilogy were originally set in the same post-holocaust Earth as Delany's earlier The Jewels of Aptor; however, linking references were removed in later revised editions.
