= Jean Marie Stine =

American novelist

- Born: Henry Eugene Stine; April 13, 1945 (age 81); Sikeston, Missouri, U.S.
- Occupations: Editor; writer; anthologist; publisher

Jean Marie Stine (born Henry Eugene Stine, 13 April 1945 in Sikeston, Missouri) is an American editor, writer, anthologist, and publisher.

== Career ==
Stine worked as a book acquisitions and development editor for Newcastle Publishing and Leisure Books. For a number of years, she was a senior editor specializing in self-help titles for publisher Jeremy P. Tarcher. Stine's own non-fiction books include Double Your Brain Power (Prentice-Hall 1997), a selection of the Quality Paperback Book Club, which was translated into five languages.

Stine has served as publisher for O'Hara Publications, The Donning Company, the International Foundation for Gender Education, and Renaissance E Books.

Anthologies she has edited include The Great Women Detectives: Seven Classic Novelettes, Hearts of the West, Reel Futures: Classic Stories that Became Great SF Movies (with Forrest J Ackerman), and Those Doggone Dogs.

During the late 1960s Stine worked as a personal assistant to Star Trek creator Gene Roddenberry on special projects.

== Author ==
As an author, she has written fiction and non-fiction on a variety of subjects for more than one hundred publications including Premier, The Los Angeles News, Amazing Stories, Eros, Conundrum, and Brain Candy. Among her best known stories are "In the Kingdom of the Sons" and "No Exit" (with Larry Niven). Known pseudonyms include Sibly Whyte, and Allen Jorgenson. Two recent ebook collections of Stine's work are Herstory & Other Science Fictions and Trans-Sexual: Tales for Gender Queers.

Stine published a number of science fiction novels and stories in the late 1960s and early 1970s as "Henry Stine", beginning with Season of the Witch in 1968, which was later adapted into the film as Memory Run. Under the name "Hank Stine", the author penned a tie-in novel based upon the TV series The Prisoner. After the departure of John J. Pierce, Stine was the editor of Galaxy for two issues in 1979. She was editor-in-chief of the science fiction and fantasy Starblaze line for Donning from 1979 to 1983, publishing titles such as Marion Zimmer Bradley's Ruins of Isis.

Issues concerning gender, such as change, role reversal and misalignment thereof, are recurrent themes in Stine's work. Stine's novel Season of the Witch describes the ordeal of a man, a hardened seducer, who lives off women, whose consciousness is transferred into the body of a woman as a legal punishment. Stine's short story "Jinni's So Long at the Fair" concerns a future in which a plague has wiped out all humans but those with a genetic abnormality, with male genes (karyotype XY) but female physiology (breasts, vagina). Another short story, "Herstory", describes deliberate manipulation of the timeline to change history so that every human religion in history has stressed the supremacy of woman over man.

== Fiction ==
- Season of the Witch. Essex House (# 0112), North Hollywood 1968 Postscript by Harlan Ellison; Masquerade Books/Rhinoceros Publications, 1994; Renaissance E Books, 2008.
- Thrill City, or The Dugpa. Essex House, North Hollywood 1969; Masquerde Books/Rhinoceros Publications, 1996.
- The Prisoner # 3. Ace Books, New York 1970; Dennis Dobson, London 1979; also called: The Prisoner: A Day in the Life. New English Library, 1982. (the third paperback following the British TV series The Prisoner cf. The Prisoner in other media).
- Forrest J. Ackerman, Jean Stine (eds.): I, Vampire: Interviews with the Undead. Longmeadowpress, Ann Arbor (1995).
- Trans-Sexual: Transgressive Erotica for Gender Queers (2008)
- Herstory & Other Science Fictions. Renaissance E Books, 2010.

== Non-fiction ==
- It's All In Your Head: Remarkable Facts About the Human Mind (1994)
- Writing Successful Self-Help and How-To Books (1997)
- Double Your Brain Power (1998)
- Ed Wood: The Early Years. Renaissance E Books, 2001.
- Super Brain Power (2002)
- Empowering Your Life with Runes (2004)
