= The Five Gold Bands =

1950 novel by Jack Vance

- Cover of first standalone edition (1953, Toby Press)
- Author: Jack Vance
- Language: English
- Genre: Science fiction
- Publication date: 1950
- Publication place: United States
- Media type: Print (Paperback)
- Pages: 128

The Five Gold Bands is a science fiction novel by American writer Jack Vance, first published in the November 1950 issue of Startling Stories magazine. It was published in 1953 as a separate book under the title The Space Pirate, and in 1963 it was paired with Vance's Hugo Award-winning novella The Dragon Masters in the form of an Ace Double.

== Plot summary ==
Twenty generations ago, an Earthman named Langtry stumbled on a way to travel efficiently among the stars. He divided the secret among his five sons, each of whom settled on a different planet. The heirs of the five, known as the Sons of Langtry, now dominate the human universe. Generations of life on strange worlds have made them visibly distinct from each other and from Earthers, who are held in contempt on each of the Sons' five homeworlds.

Picaresque Irish adventurer Paddy Blackthorn is caught attempting to steal a space drive, and is sentenced to death. In escaping from his sentence, Paddy accidentally kills the Sons of Langtry and takes from each a bracelet containing a clue to the location of one-fifth of the secret. With the help of a beautiful human secret agent, Fay Bursill, Paddy follows the clues on each of the five dominant worlds, in the hope that Earthfolk will be able to resume their rightful place in space.

== Major themes ==
First publication in November 1950 edition of Startling Stories Cover art by Earle Bergey

Although one of Vance's earliest efforts, The Five Gold Bands exhibits many of the stylistic elements that would come to characterize many of his later works: a colorful protagonist who unintentionally achieves the greater good in a frantic and desperate attempt to save his own life (and fortune), numerous exotic locales populated by equally exotic sentient species, and the theme of a treasure hunt. It also introduces another frequent theme of Vance’s work – that the environment of an alien planet will change any human colonists within a few generations to the extent that they will scarcely be recognizable as human.
