= The Dragon Masters =

1962 novella by Jack Vance

- first edition of The Dragon Masters
- Author: Jack Vance
- Language: English
- Genre: Science fiction
- Publisher: Ace Books
- Publication date: 1963
- Publication place: United States
- Media type: Print (Paperback)
- Awards: Hugo Award for Best Short Fiction (1963); Seiun Award for Best Translated Long Work (1977)

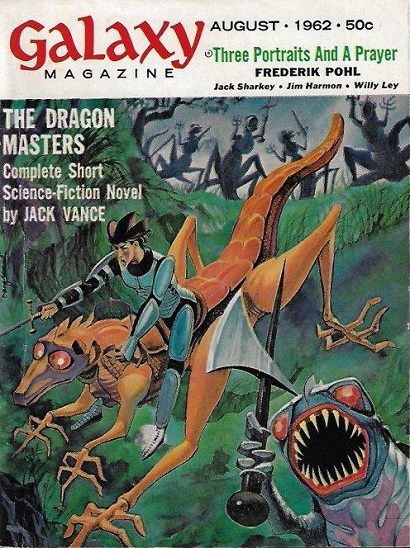
The Dragon Masters was the cover story on the August 1962 issue of Galaxy Science Fiction

The Dragon Masters is a science fiction novella by American author Jack Vance. It was first published in Galaxy magazine, August 1962, and in 1963 in book form, as half of Ace Double F-185 (with The Five Gold Bands). It won the Hugo Award for Best Short Fiction in 1963. The story describes a human society living under pre-industrial conditions that has bred lizard-like intelligent aliens to function as warriors, and an encounter with a ship from the alien planet, containing both the same aliens, and humans bred by them for similar purposes.

== Plot summary ==
The story takes place on a remote planet where humans have bred captured alien monsters (called "dragons") to serve as soldiers in a war against a different alien species.

Aerlith is a planet of rocks and wilderness orbiting a distant bright star known as Skene which appears as "an actinic point" in the daytime. The sky is described as being black rather than blue. The planet's rotation is slow, taking several days. It is so slow that dawn and dusk are accompanied by storms that follow the boundary between day and night around the planet. The night has an effect on the "Dragons" of the title, making them more vicious and unmanageable. This means that all movement of the armies must take place during daylight.

Humans live in valleys where the soil is good. Occasionally they make war on each other across the hills, passes and fells between their valley homes. Their technology is limited to steel and gunpowder. They also use semi-precious stones for decoration.

From time to time, often after many years, a spaceship appears and abducts as many humans as can be caught. The settlements are also bombarded, ensuring that humanity will not rise above its present technological level. During one such raid, a charismatic leader named Kergan Banbeck captures a group of the alien raiders, who are accompanied by their human servants. Without their masters, the humans go mad and destroy the ship. The aliens, many-limbed lizard-like creatures known as "grephs", become prisoners of the humans they came to kidnap.

Many years later, Kergan's descendant, Joaz Banbeck, is troubled by two things. He believes the grephs will return soon, and his neighbor, Ervis Carcolo of the ironically named Happy Valley, is forever plotting against him. The captive grephs have been bred over the years into fighting creatures known as dragons, ranging from the man-sized "Termagant" to the gigantic "Jugger". As each new variety has been bred over the years, the fortunes of war have shifted between the Banbecks and the Carcolos. Now there is an uneasy peace.

There is a third group of humans, the "Sacerdotes", mysterious ascetics who walk naked in all weathers. They are characterized by very long hair, pale complexions, and the golden torc each wears around the neck. Only males are seen. They trade for what they need and seem to possess advanced technologies. They believe that they are beyond human, calling the rest of humankind "Utter Men", who will eventually disappear and leave the universe to them.

Joaz Banbeck tries without success to convince Ervis Carcolo and the Sacerdotes of the need to prepare for the next visit by the grephs. Ervis Carcolo, far from cooperating, attacks Banbeck Vale, only to have his army routed by Joaz's ingenious tactics.

Joaz is able to confine a Sacerdote and ask him questions, only to have the man apparently die. Taking his torc and making a wig from the man's hair, Joaz attempts to examine the Sacerdotes' cave home. They are definitely working on something big. Returning home, he is confronted by the Sacerdote he had thought dead, who demands the return of his torc and walks silently away.

Subsequently, Joaz has a dream in which he talks to the sacerdote leader and tries to persuade him to help. The leader, known as the Demie, refuses, claiming that to involve himself in the affairs of Utter Men is to destroy the detachment necessary to their lifestyle. Joaz suspects they are building a spaceship.

Ervis Carcolo attacks again. Once again, Joaz defeats him, but at that moment, the grephs reappear. Happy Valley is destroyed and Banbeck Vale is obviously next.

Besides the power of the ship itself, the grephs have humans whom they have bred, just as the men of Aerlith have bred their dragons. The "Heavy Trooper" is physically equal to the Termagant, and a "Giant" matches the monstrous Jugger. Some of the humans have been bred to track people by smell, and still others are used like horses, like their dragon counterparts, the Spiders.

The grephs attack, tentatively at first. Their troops are astonished by the dragons who so resemble their masters. The fighting is bloody and Joaz moves his people into caves and tunnels for safety. The grephs decide simply to bombard the Vale since they cannot take the people. Joaz has anticipated this, and lures them to a spot where he believes the sacerdotes' workshops are located.

Carcolo, almost with his last remaining energy and backed by his now demoralized troops, assaults the ship from an unguarded quarter. Joaz coincidentally decides on a similar tactic, and is amazed to find Carcolo already inside. Together they free many people, but cannot gain control of the ship. The destruction of the Vale seems inevitable, until Joaz's scheme pays off. The Sacerdote cavern is blown open, and the Sacerdotes are forced to use the engine of their spaceship to project a beam of energy at the alien ship, disabling it. Joaz and his troops complete the rout and capture the ship. However, the Sacerdote ship is destroyed.

The Demie is driven out of his detachment by what Joaz has forced him to do. He upbraids Joaz for causing the destruction of the work of centuries just to save himself. Joaz refuses to apologize, and when Carcolo, now a prisoner, absurdly continues to assert his claim to the ship, Joaz has him executed.

At the end, Joaz surveys the ruins of his home. He picks up a small round object, a semi-precious stone carved to be a globe of Eden or Tempe or even Earth, the mythical home of humans. He plans to find the other worlds where humans live, if he can repair the alien ship. For now, he must rebuild the homes of his people. He tosses the globe back on the rockpile and walks away.

== Characters ==
=== Joaz Banbeck ===
Joaz Banbeck is the lord of Banbeck Vale. He is descended from a line of ruthless and charismatic fighters, particularly Kergan Banbeck who captured almost the entire crew of a greph ship, thus establishing the breeding population from which the Dragons are descended. Joaz himself is educated and cultured, and regarded as weak by his enemies because of that. His people, however, live well thanks to well-built dwellings, mostly in freshly-excavated caves, and a well-engineered water supply from a dam. Banbeck Vale is described as having better soil than the other valley habitats.

Joaz has various artifacts in his possession that show his interest in matters beyond the planet he lives on. One is a globe made of marble that depicts a world variously known as Eden, Tempe, or Earth, the original home of humans. Another is a device that shows the local stars in relation to each other in real time, allowing Joaz to predict the close approach of the star Coralyne, whose appearance always means a greph invasion.

Joaz's family life is only hinted at. There is mention of a son and the son's mother, but other than that his main companion is Phade, a "minstrel-maiden" who seems to act as a geisha or even a concubine. Joaz's rival Ervis Carcolo is described as having many wives, and it is reasonable to suppose that Joaz may also have more than one consort.

=== Ervis Carcolo ===
Ervis Carcolo is lord of the ironically named Happy Valley. He is also descended from famous fighters. However, he is obsessed with regaining the glory Happy Valley once enjoyed, before the first greph invasion, and the subsequent Dragon wars. He focuses entirely on breeding more and better Dragons at the expense of the well-being of his people. Joaz Banbeck points out that most of his people live in huts rather than caves, leaving them easy prey for the grephs. Carcolo dismisses him as weak and effete. His only reason to parley with Joaz is to invite him to plot against the Sacerdotes.

Carcolo is probably older than Joaz, since he fought in battle against Joaz's great-uncle when Joaz himself was just a sickly child. At that time Carcolo was gored by a horned Dragon but managed to retreat. Since that time there has been an uneasy peace between the two communities.

=== Bast Givven ===
Bast Givven is Carcolo's Head Dragon Master, military adviser and to some extent, his conscience. When Carcolo plots attacks on Banbeck Vale it is Givven who points out the poor quality of their forces, particularly their lack of large Dragons. Givven has a deep understanding of tactics and knows the limitations of men and Dragons in the peculiar conditions of Aerlith. After Carcolo is executed, Joaz makes Givven lord of Happy Valley, or at least what is left of it.

=== Dae Alvonso ===
Dae Alvonso is an itinerant merchant, and a trafficker in dragon eggs, children, gossip, and anything else that will make him a profit. He is used by both Joaz Banbeck and Ervis Carcolo to send messages to each other.

=== Phade ===
Phade is a "minstrel-maiden" in the service of Joaz Banbeck. She is trained to entertain and please men, though the exact nature of her services is not described. She is the one who discovers the sacerdote in Joaz's study at the beginning of the story. Her impressions of Joaz, particularly her inability to understand his personality to apply her training to him, serve to introduce him before he first appears in the story. Thereafter she is an interlocutor character to whom Joaz explains elements of the plot.

=== The Sacerdotes ===
The sacerdotes are ascetics who walk naked in all weathers and are devoted to truth and knowledge. Their only attire is a golden torc around the neck and their long hair. They live in caves somewhere around Banbeck Vale and possibly in other locations. Only male sacerdotes are seen outside the caves, although Joaz sees females when he sneaks into the sacerdote cave. Like the men they are thin with clear pale skin, long hair and no clothes. The most important thing in a sacerdote's life is the tand, a construction of twisted wire created by each individual based on study of the original tand. The tand reflects the individual's personality and philosophy. It is judged by the senior sacerdotes, and based on their assessment the individual can enjoy promotion within the community, or even be expelled.

One feature of the sacerdote creed is that they must answer any question put to them, and answer truthfully. On the other hand, they are skilled at giving answers that avoid giving away their secrets, or affecting the conduct of others. Some answers can be accurate but useless. For instance, when dealing with a human emissary from the grephs, Kergan Banbeck asks a sacerdote how he can persuade the emissary to do as he wishes. The sacerdote suggests erasing his memory and rewriting it, clearly an impossible task.

The sacerdotes have no names. Their leader is called "The Demie". Two sacerdotes and the Demie feature in the plot. One is the sacerdote who invades Joaz Banbeck's personal chambers. He is discovered by Phade but escapes via a secret passage. Joaz discovers the passage and sets a trap which the sacerdote later springs. Joaz detains him and asks him questions about his reason for being there. The sacerdote is evasive but admits that his mission is to learn about Joaz, and implies that he is in line to become the Demie. After lengthy questioning, he enters a deathlike state, whereupon Joaz uses his hair to fashion a wig and, taking the torc he wears, enters the secret passage himself disguised as a sacerdote. The sacerdote himself revives just as Joaz returns from his expedition.

Another sacerdote appeared, years before, as Kergan Banbeck, having captured twenty-three grephs, negotiated with a human servant of the grephs. The emissary speaks and thinks in a way that Kergan cannot handle. To the emissary, reality is a predestined sequence of events that does not include the holding of grephs as hostages. The only way of preserving reality is for the hostages to be released. The sacerdote understands this, but cannot or will not make any suggestion that gets Kergan what he wants.

=== The grephs ===
As the captive grephs are led away by Kergan Banbeck, we gain some insight into their thought processes. They think of themselves as "The Revered". Their entire philosophy is predicated on a series of predestined events described in a way similar to the mathematics of quantum mechanics. Some events and outcomes – such as being captured – are forbidden for the Revered. They are therefore forced to conclude that they are not Revered and must be some other kind of creature altogether.

The grephs are described as "standing on two legs, with two versatile members at mid-body, a pair of multi-articulated brachs at the neck", indicating that they have six limbs. As they provided the original breeding stock for the Dragons, they are also called Basics.

=== The Dragons ===
After many years of breeding by the humans, thanks to their providing eggs almost every year, the Dragons are changed into semi-intelligent beasts that can be trained to use weapons and respond to voice commands using "dragon talk", a code that is different for each dragon army. Their scaly skin resists bullets and blades, except in certain vulnerable locations.

Breeds include:

- Termagants - these are closest to the Basics in size. They are tough, reproduce quickly, and can be trained to use pistol, sword and mace. They are usually the biggest component of a Dragon army. The color of their scales is rusty-red.
- Murderers - these come in two varieties, known as Striding and Long-horned. They are not described in detail, except to note that the Long-horned variety has a horn growing from the midsection, although another part of the story implies that there are horns on the head as well. Murderers seem to be used as shock troops. The color of their scales is brown.
- Fiends - these are squat, powerful beasts that can fight with sword and mace, but also have a heavy spiked ball at the end of a tail. This can be swung from side to side. It is particularly effective against Juggers if the Fiend can employ it between the Jugger's legs. The color of their scales is black-green.
- Blue Horrors - these are agile beasts equipped with pincers enabling them to dismember an opponent. The color of their scales is toxic-blue.
- Juggers - these are much larger than all the other Dragon breeds. They can use large hand weapons, but they are slow and ponderous. They are also hard to breed, so an army will have relatively few Juggers. However they can be extremely effective in the right situation, being able to pick up opponents and tear them apart. The color of their scales is grey.
- Spiders - these are bred to be large and fast enough to carry a human rider. The name implies that they use all available limbs for running. A high status individual such as Ervis Carcolo rides a beast that has been heavily decorated and is well-disciplined.

=== Servants of the grephs ===
The grephs use the humans they harvest from different planets in the same way as the humans on Aerlith use the Dragons. Since humans breed more slowly than grephs, they are less diverse than the Dragons.

In the story, the humans encounter the following types:

- Heavy Troopers. Short and squat, these are the infantry soldiers of the grephs. They use various weapons, ranging from "blasters" to swords, and are equipped with body armor. One Heavy Trooper is typically able to defeat a single Termagant in hand-to-hand combat.
- Weaponeers. These are similar to the men of Aerlith. They are in charge of advanced weapons, as their name implies. They are also used as go-betweens in negotiations.
- Giants. Described as "twice the size of a man", they have body armor and can carry large "energy projectors". However they are no match for the Juggers in hand-to-hand combat.
- Trackers. Bred for a highly developed sense of smell, they are used to find opponents who are hiding. They have enlarged noses and weak or nonexistent chins. They are agile and can climb quickly.
- Mounts. These are humans bred to run on all fours and carry a greph on their backs.
- Matrons. These are seen in the dormitories where the humans captured by the grephs are kept.
- Mechanics. Described as small and sharp-featured, these are the maintenance crews on the greph ships.

== Release details ==
- New York: Ace Books, 1963, Paperback (Ace Double F-185 bound with The Five Gold Bands)
- London: Dennis Dobson, 1965, Hardback (first separate edition)

== Sources ==
- Underwood, Tim; Chuck Miller (1980). Jack Vance. New York: Taplinger Publishing Company. p. 228. ISBN 0-8008-4295-2.
