= Lord of the Trees =

1970 novel by Philip José Farmer

- First edition
- Author: Philip José Farmer
- Cover artist: Gray Morrow
- Language: English
- Genre: Science fiction
- Publisher: Ace Books
- Publication date: 1970
- Publication place: United States
- Media type: Print (hardback & paperback)

Lord of the Trees is an American novel by Philip José Farmer. Originally released in 1970, it was one of two intertwining sequels to Farmer's previous A Feast Unknown; The Mad Goblin is a sequel to both books. Lord of the Trees features Lord Grandrith, an analogue (or "Tarzanalogue") of Tarzan, as the main character.

== Plot summary ==
At the end of A Feast Unknown, Grandrith and Doc Caliban (a thinly disguised Doc Savage) cease fighting each other upon learning that their personal war and indeed their entire lives were engineered by the Nine, a megalomaniacal and powerful secret society. The two men have a sexual affliction in common; they are impotent except when performing acts of violence; a temporary side effect of a serum that grants them eternal life—another product of the Nine. Angered by the ways they have been manipulated, the two heroes split up to overthrow the Nine, ultimately meeting up at the end. Lord of the Trees shows the story from Grandrith's point of view. The Mad Goblin tells the same story from Doc Caliban's viewpoint.

During the events of the book, Grandrith kills a member of the Nine, Mubaniga. The oldest member of the Nine, XauXaz, died previously of extreme old age in A Feast Unknown. Two other members, Jiinfan and Iwaldi, are killed in The Mad Goblin. In the end, only five of the Nine remain alive.

== Connection to Wold Newton family ==
Like A Feast Unknown, Lord of the Trees contains many elements in common with Farmer's Wold Newton family concept, primarily the presence of characters based on Doc Savage and Tarzan. However, there is some disagreement as to where the stories fit into Farmer's fictional chronology, or, indeed, whether they fit at all. Farmer himself said that it was best to "let the reader decide," but some Wold Newton fans have taken it upon themselves to explain the apparent discrepancies. In particular, see Dennis E. Power's essays "Triple Tarzan Tangle," "Tarzan? Jane?" and "Tarzans in the Valley of Gold".

== Publishing history ==
The book was originally released as an "Ace Double" with The Mad Goblin in 1970. This copy featured cover art by Gray Morrow. Another Ace Double edition was published a decade later, in 1980. The book was later published in the United Kingdom in 1983 by Severn with art by Julie Smith. It was also released by Sphere in 1983, and in 1988 as an omnibus called "Empire of the Nine". The French edition was entitled "Le Seigneur des Arbes" ("The Lord of the Trees").
