= Image of the Beast (novel) =

1968 novel by Philip José Farmer

- First edition
- Author: Philip José Farmer
- Cover artist: Peter Max
- Language: English
- Genre: Horror, erotica
- Publisher: Essex House
- Publication date: 1968
- Publication place: United States
- Media type: Print
- Pages: 255
- ISBN: 1-902197-24-0
- OCLC: 2321260
- Followed by: Blown

Image of the Beast (1968) is a horror erotic novel by American writer Philip José Farmer.

== Background ==
The story follows Herald Childe, a private detective, who is sent a snuff film of his partner being murdered by what appears to be a vampire. His investigation into the identity of the killers leads him into a world of apparent monsters who have a predilection for brutal and supernatural sex. The monsters include vampires, werewolves, snake-women, and other undefined shape-changers.

The first printing or first edition of Image of the Beast was written for sf-porn publisher Essex House. It was a paperback selling at $1.95.

== Sequels ==
The novel got a sequel in 1973 called Blown.

Farmer wrote a third Herald Childe novel in 1973 titled Traitor to the Living.

Image of the Beast was adapted by artist Tim Boxell (under the pseudonym "Grisly") as a comic book published by Last Gasp in 1973, with a second printing in 1979.
