= The Mad Goblin =

1970 novel by Philip José Farmer

- First edition
- Author: Philip José Farmer
- Cover artist: Gray Morrow
- Language: English
- Genre: Science fiction
- Publisher: Ace Books
- Publication date: 1970
- Publication place: United States
- Media type: Print (hardback & paperback)

The Mad Goblin is an American novel by Philip José Farmer. Originally released in 1970, it was one of two intertwining sequels to Farmer's previous A Feast Unknown, along with Lord of the Trees. The Mad Goblin features Doc Caliban, an analogue of Doc Savage, as the main character. The novel was later retitled Keepers of the Secrets.

== Plot summary ==
At the end of A Feast Unknown, Caliban and Lord Grandrith (a thinly disguised Tarzan) cease fighting each other upon learning that their personal war and indeed their entire lives were engineered by the Nine, a megalomaniacal and powerful secret society. The two men have a sexual affliction in common; they are impotent except when performing acts of violence. This is caused by a serum that grants them eternal life—another product of the Nine. Angered by the ways they have been manipulated, the two heroes split up to overthrow the Nine, ultimately meeting up at the end. The Mad Goblin shows the story from Caliban's point of view. Lord of the Trees tells the same story from Lord Grandrith's viewpoint.

During the events of the book, Caliban (assisted by "Porky" Rivers and "Jocko" Simmons, analogues of "Ham" Brooks and "Monk" Mayfair from the Doc Savage stories) kills two members of the Nine, Jiinfan and Iwaldi. The oldest member of the Nine, XauXaz, had previously died of extreme age in A Feast Unknown. Grandrith kills one other, Mubaniga, in Lord of the Trees. In the end, only five of the Nine remain alive.

== Connection to Wold Newton family ==
Like A Feast Unknown, The Mad Goblin contains many elements in common with Farmer's Wold Newton family concept, primarily the presence of characters based on Doc Savage and Tarzan. However, there is some disagreement as to where the stories fit into Farmer's fictional chronology, or, indeed, whether they fit at all. Farmer himself said that it was best to "let the reader decide", but some Wold Newton fans have taken it upon themselves to explain the apparent discrepancies. In particular, see Dennis E. Power's essays "Triple Tarzan Tangle", "Tarzan? Jane?", and "Tarzans in the Valley of Gold".

== Publishing history ==
The book was originally released as an "Ace Double" with Lord of the Trees in 1970. This copy featured cover art by Gray Morrow. Another Ace Double edition was published a decade later, in 1980. The book was later published in the United Kingdom in 1983 by Severn with art by Julie Smith. It was also released by Sphere in 1983, and in 1988 as an omnibus called "Empire of the Nine", as well as a separate omnibus edition entitled "Keeper of the Secrets". It was also released as part of a Russian omnibus series along with Time's Last Gift. This book was volume twenty-three in the "Worlds of Philip José Farmer" series of Russian collections.

== Reception ==
Dave Pringle reviewed Keepers of the Secrets for Imagine magazine; he stated that "Keepers of the Secrets drips with much blood but nothing else. A pity, in a way. At his best, Farmer has an outrageous imagination, but here it was not permitted to frolic to the full."

== Reviews ==
- Review by Lester del Rey (1971) in Worlds of If, January–February 1971
- Review by Steven E. McDonald (1980) in Science Fiction Review, Winter 1980
- Review by Spider Robinson (1980) in Analog Science Fiction/Science Fact, December 1980
- Review by Chris Barker (1986) in Vector 132
