= The Angry Espers =

1959 novel by Lloyd Biggle

- First edition
- Author: Lloyd Biggle, Jr.
- Cover artist: Ed Valigursky
- Language: English
- Genre: science-fiction novel
- Published: 1961 (Ace Books)
- Publication place: US
- Media type: Print (paperback)
- Pages: 136 (paperback edition)
- OCLC: 2592544

The Angry Espers is a science-fiction novel written by Lloyd Biggle, Jr. and published by Ace Books as half of Ace Double #D-485 in 1961. The novel first appeared in the August 1959 issue of Amazing Science Fiction Stories as A Taste of Fire. In 1962 it was given Honorable Mention as a candidate for the Best Novel Hugo Award.

== Plot ==
Paul Corban wakes up in a hospital on an alien world populated by people who look exactly like Terrans. When he tries to talk to the doctors, though, his questions are met with looks of horror and revulsion and with an eerie silence. His wounds from the crash of his spaceship heal and his hosts offer what appears to be a kind of therapy, always in total silence. He fails to meet the therapists' expectations (he can't even figure out what they are), so he is taken to a pleasant place called Raxtinu, an asylum for the mentally disabled.

In Raxtinu he meets the lovely Dr. Alir, who teaches him the spoken version of the Donirian telepathic language. He has, by this time, discerned that the Donirians possess the powers of telepathy, telekinesis, and teleportation. He has also fallen in love with Alir. Nonetheless, he wants to go home and when he knows enough Donirian he explains this fact to Alir and Director Wiln. After giving Wiln all of the information he can about the Galactic Federation, he and Wiln are shocked to discover that he won't be sent home after all: the Donirian government has chosen instead to wage a war of extermination against the Federation.

After giving Wiln the information on the Federation Paul learns from another lost Terran how hideously bigoted the Donirians are, how deeply they hate anyone who does not share their teledynamic abilities. Other lost Terrans who had landed on Donir seeking help have been lynched. And now the Federation is under attack by people who regard all Terrans as demented savages. The conflict quickly degenerates into a war of atrocity and attrition.

Meanwhile, Paul is taken out of Raxtinu, which is a refuge for people who lack teledynamic powers, and put into an asylum for the truly insane. Before the inmates can kill him Alir rescues him from the asylum, taking him to her mother's estate. There Alir and her mother resume the therapy that had been intended to help Paul develop teledynamic powers, a therapy that has so far failed. Then soldiers appear on the estate and Paul hides from them by climbing into a tree. The soldiers find him and one aims a weapon at him and fires. Paul loses consciousness.

He regains consciousness lying on the same spot in Raxtinu that he had been thinking about when the soldier shot him: he infers that he teleported and he goes to inform Director Wiln. Wiln discerns which weapon was used, a kind of stun gun, and he uses it as a therapeutic device to help Paul develop his latent teledynamic powers. Later, as a fully developed teledyne, Paul goes before the Donirian Council and convinces its members to sue for peace. The Council then chooses Paul and Alir to serve as its ambassadors to the Galactic Federation.

In this ending, of a protagonist gaining his freedom from alien captors by developing teledynamic abilities, The Angry Espers may remind the reader of the ending of Alan E. Nourse's Rocket to Limbo.

== Publication history ==
- 1959, US, Ziff-Davis Publishing Company (Amazing Science Fiction Stories (better known as Amazing Stories), Vol. 33, No. 8 (Aug 1959)), OCLC #11426129, Magazine (148 pp), as A Taste of Fire.
- 1961, US, Ace Books (Ace Double #D-485), OCLC #2592544, paperback (136 pp).
- 1961, Germany, Moewig Verlag (Terra Sonderband #47), OCLC #11426036, digest (94 pp), as Die Unbesiegbaren (The Invincibles).
- 1968, United Kingdom, Robert Hale Ltd., ISBN 0-7091-0323-9, Pub date Aug 1968, hardback (192 pp).
- 1969, Germany, Wilhelm Goldmann Verlag (Munich)(Weltraum Taschenbücher Band 109), OCLC #164702667, (150 pp), as Invasion der Supermenschen (Invasion of the Supermen).
- 1971, Brazil, Livros do Brasil (Argonauta #168), OCLC #11426006, paperback (152 pp), as A Guerra dos Fantasmas (The War of the Ghosts)
- 1974, Germany, Wilhelm Goldmann Verlag (Munich)(Weltraum Taschenbücher Band 109), OCLC #74160638, (150 pp), as Invasion der Supermenschen (Invasion of the Supermen).

== Reviews ==
The book was reviewed by

- P. Schuyler Miller at Analog Science Fact & Fiction (Jul 1961).

== Awards and nominations ==
The Angry Espers received an Honorable Mention for the 1962 Hugo Awards for Best Novel.

== Listings ==
The book is listed at

- The British Library as UIN = BLL01009929926
