= Leigh Richmond =

American writer

- Born: Ruth Leigh Tucker; April 21, 1911; Pennsylvania, U.S.
- Died: July 14, 1995 (age 84); Clyde, North Carolina, U.S.
- Other names: Leigh Richmond-Donahue
- Occupation: Writer
- Relatives: Charles Wertenbaker (brother-in-law); Timberlake Wertenbaker (niece)

Leigh Tucker Richmond (April 21, 1911 – July 14, 1995), also known as Leigh Richmond-Donahue, was an American writer.

== Early life and education ==
Tucker was born in Pennsylvania and raised in Montana, Louisiana, Kentucky, and Georgia, one of the five daughters of Royal Kenneth Tucker and Juliet Luttrell Tucker. Her father was an Episcopalian clergyman. She attended Sophia Newcomb College in New Orleans. Her sister Lael Tucker Wertenbaker was a writer and journalist.

== Career ==
Richmond worked as a reporter, photographer, and editor at smaller newspapers, including at the Brevard Sentinel and the Englewood Herald. She and her third husband Walt Richmond ran the Centric Foundation and the Richmond-Rohde Press, focused on unconventional ideas in science and education. Their co-authored stories and novels reflect some of the same interests.

Richmond taught at the Florida Institute of Technology. The Richmonds spoke at a 1976 Star Trek fan convention in Florida. She served on the Brevard Local Government Study Commission, but resigned in 1980, in protest over plans for a regional water authority. In 1993, she spoke at a school in Olympia, Washington, and billed herself as a "physicist and anthropologist".

== Publications ==
- "Prologue to an Analogue" (1961)
- Field effect : The pi phase of physics (1993)

=== With Walt Richmond ===
- Where I Wasn't Going (1963; also published in 1976 as Challenge the Hellmaker)
- "Shortsite", "Shortstack" "Poppa Needs Shorts", "The Pie-Duddle Puddle", "Gallagher's Glacier", and "I, BEM" (1964, with Walt Richmond)
- "Cows Can't Eat Grass" (1967)
- Shock Wave (1967)
- The Lost Millennium (1967)
- "If the Sabot Fits..." (1968)
- Phoenix Ship (1969)
- "Shorts Wing" (1970)
- Positive Charge (1970 story collection)
- Gallagher's Glacier (1970)
- "Antalogia" (1973)
- "Song of the Space Cadets" (1975, poem)
- Probability Corner (1977)
- Phase Two (1980)
- Siva! A Science Fiction Novel of the Far Past (2018, a posthumous publication)

=== With R. C. Fitzpatrick ===
- "There is a Tide" (1968)

=== With Dick Richmond-Donahue ===
- Blindsided (1993)

== Personal life ==
Tucker married four times, and had three children. She married her first husband, businessman George Sinclair Loane, in 1933. Walter Forbes Richmond, her third husband, died in 1977. She married her fourth husband, city official Richard V. Donahue, in 1979. Richmond died in 1995, at the age of 84, in Clyde, North Carolina.
