= Francis Rufus Bellamy =

American writer and editor

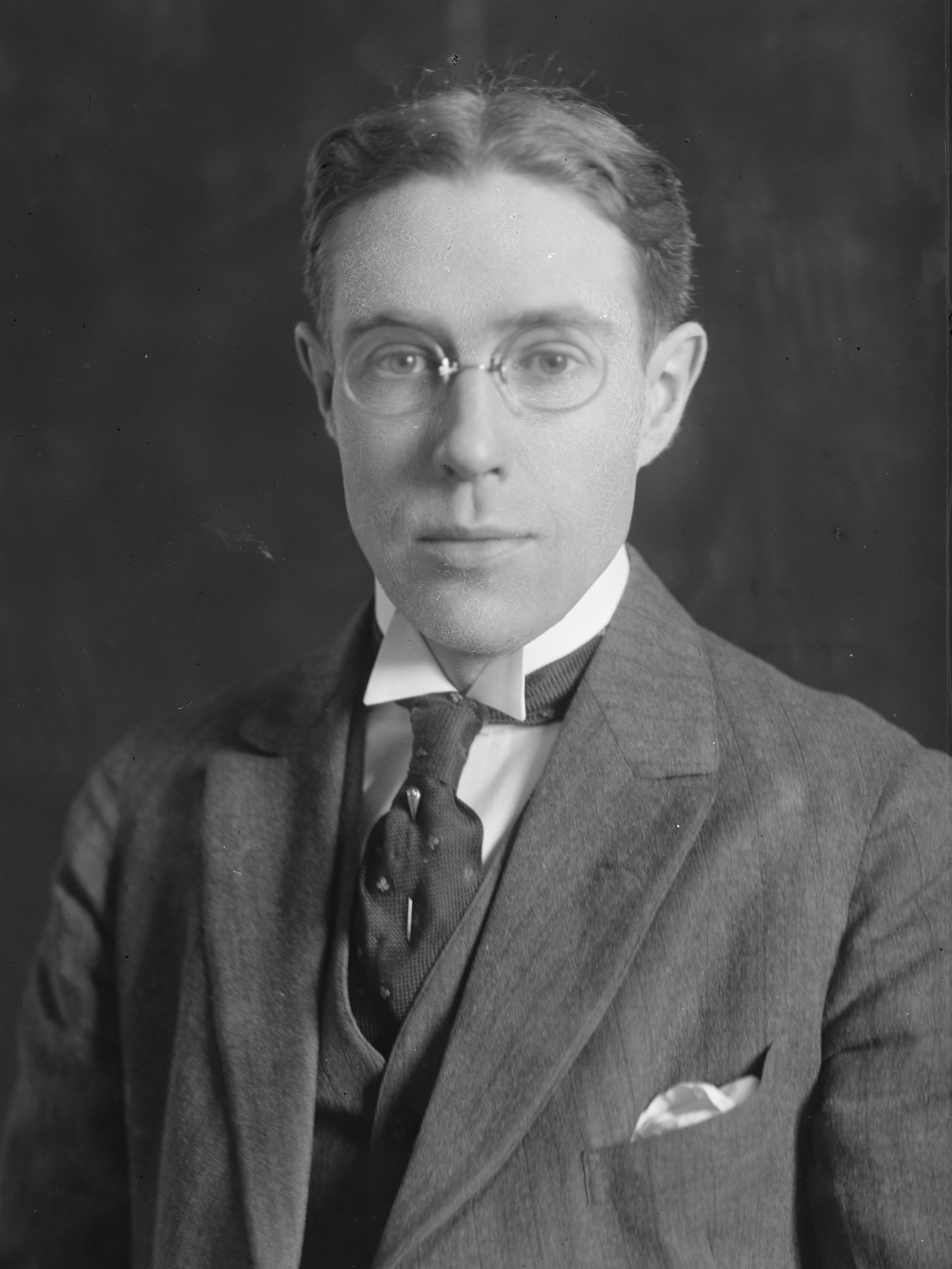
Francis R. Bellamy

Francis Rufus Bellamy (December 24, 1886 New Rochelle, New York – February 1972) was an American writer and editor.

== Life ==
Bellamy was editor of The Outlook from 1927 to 1932, and was executive editor of The New Yorker in 1933. He was editor of Fiction Parade from 1935 to 1938, and became editor of Scribner's Commentator in 1939. He became president of University Publishers Inc. in 1958.

== Publications ==
- A Flash of Gold (1922)
- Spanish Faith: A Romance of Old Mexico and the Caribbean (1926)
- We Hold These Truths: An Anthology of the Faith and Courage of our Forefathers (1942)
- Blood Money: The Story of US Treasury Secret Agents (1947)
- The Private Life of George Washington (1951)
- Atta (1953)
- The Architect at Mid-Century Vol. II: Conversations Across the Nation (1954)
