= Brighter than a Thousand Suns =

Brighter than a Thousand Suns may refer to:

- Brighter than a Thousand Suns (album), by the band Killing Joke
- Brighter than a Thousand Suns (book), by Robert Jungk first published in English in 1958
- "Brighter than a Thousand Suns," a track from the Iron Maiden album A Matter of Life and Death

== See also ==
- "Brighter Than the Sun", a song by Colbie Caillat
