= Lan Wright =

British science fiction writer (1923–2010)

- Lan Wright c.1956
- Born: Lionel Percy Wright; 8 July 1923; Watford, Hertfordshire, England
- Died: 1 October 2010 (aged 87)
- Occupations: Author, manufacturing
- Writing career
- Language: English
- Genre: Science fiction

Lionel Percy Wright, known professionally as Lan Wright (1923–2010) was a British science fiction writer. All of his fiction has been published under the pen name "Lan Wright".

During the period 1952 to 1963, Wright was a regular contributor to various British SF magazines, including E. J. Carnell's New Worlds and Science Fantasy. Wright published no fiction after 1968, due to increased responsibilities of his employment.

Wright was married, lived in Watford and was employed by British Railways. He was a "keen" amateur cricket player.

== Works ==
His first story was "Operation Exodus", which appeared in New Worlds in 1952. "Dream World" appeared in Nebula Science Fiction #21, May 1957. His novels include:

- Who Speaks of Conquest? (1956) Ace Books bound dos-à-dos with Donald A. Wollheim's The Earth in Peril.
- A Man Called Destiny (1958) Ace Books bound dos-à-dos with Robert Silverberg's Stepsons of Terra.
- Assignment Luther (1963)
- Exile From Xanadu (1964) Ace Books bound dos-à-dos with Fred Saberhagen's The Golden People.
- The Last Hope of Earth (1965)
- The Pictures of Pavanne (1968)

== Sources ==
- Clute, John; Nicholls, Peter, eds. (1993). The Encyclopedia of Science Fiction. New York: St. Martin's Press, Inc. ISBN 0-312-09618-6.
