= Essex House (publisher) =

Essex House is a Los Angeles publishing imprint, a subsidiary of Milton Luros's Parliament News, Inc, which between 1968 and 1969, published 37 erotica novels. About half the 37 titles published by Essex House were sci-fi/fantasy; the authors published include Philip José Farmer, David Meltzer, Michael Perkins, Jean Marie Stine, Charles Bukowski.

== Bibliography ==
- Paul V. Dallas, Binding with Briars, 1968
- Richard E. Geis, Ravished, 1968
- Philip José Farmer, Image of the Beast, 1968
- Michael Perkins, Blue Movie, 1968
- David Meltzer, The Agency, 1968
- David Meltzer, The Agent, 1968
- David Meltzer How Many Blocks in the Pile, 1968
- David Meltzer, Orf, 1968
- Michael Perkins, Down Here, 1968
- Michael Perkins, Evil companions, 1968
- Michael Perkins, Queen of Heat, 1968
- Gil Porter, Coupled, 1968
- Jerry Anderson, Trans, 1969
- Gary Bradbrook, Get It On!, 1969
- Charles Bukowski, Notes of a Dirty Old Man, 1969
- P. N. Dedeaux, The Nothing Things, 1969
- P. N. Dedeaux, Tender Buns, 1969
- Philip José Farmer, Blown, 1969
- Philip José Farmer, A Feast Unknown, 1969
- Jane Gallion, Biker, 1969
- Richard E. Geis, Raw Meat, 1969
- Gil Lamont, Roach, 1969
- Michael Macpherson, Abducted, 1969
- Alan S. Marlowe, Over Easy, 1969
- David Meltzer, Glue Factory, 1969
- David Meltzer, Healer, 1969
- David Meltzer, Lovely, 1969
- David Meltzer, The Martyr, 1969
- David Meltzer, Out, 1969
- Michael Perkins, Estelle, 1969
- Michael Perkins, Terminus, 1969
- Michael Perkins, Whacking Off, 1969
- Alice Louise Ramirez, The Geek, 1969
- Hank Stine, Thrill City, 1969
- Hank Stine, Season of the Witch, 1969
- Henry Toledano, The Bitter Seed, 1969
- Henry Toledano, A Sort of Justice, 1969
- Charles McNaughton Jr., Mindblower, 1969
