= The Man Who Lived Forever =

1956 novel by Anna Hunger and R. DeWitt Miller

First edition Cover art by Stanley Meltzoff

The Man Who Lived Forever is a 1956 science fiction novel by Anna Hunger and R. DeWitt Miller published by Ace Books.

It was reviewed in 1956 in The Magazine of Fantasy & Science Fiction by Anthony Boucher and also that year in Astounding Science Fiction by P. Schuyler Miller, in 1957 in Astounding Science Fiction and 1978 by Dave Truesdale in The Diversifier.
