= Philip E. High =

Science fiction author

- Born: Philip Empson High; 28 April 1914; Biggleswade, Bedfordshire, UK
- Died: 9 August 2006 (aged 92); Canterbury, Kent, UK
- Occupations: Bus driver and Author
- Spouse: Pamela Baker
- Writing career
- Pen name: B. J. Empson
- Language: English
- Period: 1954-2006
- Genre: Science fiction

Philip Empson High (28 April 1914 - 9 August 2006) was an English science fiction author.

== Life ==
Philip Empson High was born in Biggleswade, Bedfordshire. He saw service in the Royal Navy during World War II.

His writing career spanned more than 50 years before his death in Canterbury, Kent on 9 August 2006. He published 14 novels and numerous short stories.

High first became well known during the 1950s with a series of short stories for various magazines including Authentic Science Fiction, New Worlds Science Fiction and Nebula Science Fiction, and was voted "top discovery" by the Nebula readers' poll for 1956 (the "Guinea Prize").

His first novel, The Prodigal Sun, was published in 1964 and was followed by 13 more, ending in 1979 with Blindfold from the Stars. A collection of his earlier short stories, The Best of Philip E. High, was published in 2002 along with a collection of new stories Step to the Stars (2004).

== Novels ==
- The Prodigal Sun (1964)
- No Truce With Terra (1964)
- The Mad Metropolis (1966) (later reissued as Double Illusion (1970))
- Reality Forbidden (1967)
- These Savage Futurians (1967)
- Twin Planets (1967)
- The Time Mercenaries (1968)
- Invader on My Back (1968)
- Butterfly Planet (1971)
- Come, Hunt an Earthman (1973)
- Sold - For a Spaceship (1973)
- Speaking of Dinosaurs (1974)
- Fugitive from Time (1978)
- Blindfold from the Stars (1979)

== Short story collections ==
- The Best of Philip E. High (2002)
- Step to the Stars (2004)
- Guilty as Charged: Fantastic Crime Stories (2013)
