= Lloyd Biggle Jr. =

American historian and writer

- Born: April 17, 1923; Waterloo, Iowa, U.S.
- Died: September 12, 2002 (aged 79)
- Education: Wayne State University (BA); University of Michigan (MM, PhD)
- Occupations: Musician; author; oral historian
- Writing career
- Genre: Science fiction

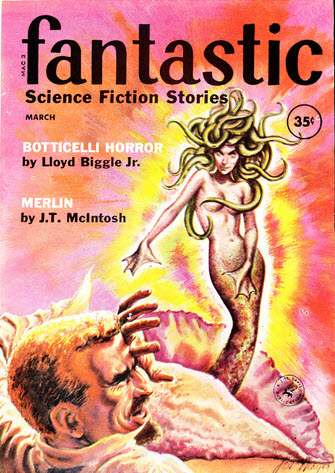
Biggle's novelette "The Botticelli Horror" was the cover story for the March 1960 issue of Fantastic

Lloyd Biggle Jr. (April 17, 1923 – September 12, 2002) was an American musician, author, and oral historian.

== Biography ==
Biggle was born in 1923 in Waterloo, Iowa. He served in World War II as a communications sergeant in a rifle company of the 102nd Infantry Division; during the war, he was wounded twice. His second wound, a shrapnel wound in his leg received near the Elbe River at the end of the war, left him disabled for life.

After the war, Biggle resumed his education. He received an A.B. Degree with High Distinction from Wayne State University and M.M. and Ph.D. degrees from the University of Michigan. Biggle taught at the University of Michigan and at Eastern Michigan University in the 1950s. He began writing professionally in 1955 and became a full-time writer with the publication of his novel, All the Colors of Darkness in 1963; he continued in the writing profession until his death.

== Career ==
Biggle was celebrated in science fiction circles as the author who introduced aesthetics into a literature known for its scientific and technological complications. His stories frequently used musical and artistic themes. Songwriter Jimmy Webb and novelist Orson Scott Card have written of the tremendous effect that his early story, "The Tunesmith", had on them in their youth. Among Biggle's enduring science fiction creations were the matter-transmission trouble-shooting team of Jan Darzek/Effie Schlupe, and the Cultural Survey, featured in novels and magazine stories, through which Biggle explored issues of multi-culturalism and technology.

In the field of mystery writing, Biggle's Grandfather Rastin stories appeared for many years in Ellery Queen's Mystery Magazine. He loved writing historical fiction set in late Victorian and Edwardian England. He wrote a series of new Sherlock Holmes stories from the perspective of Edward Porter Jones, an assistant who began his association with Holmes as a "Baker Street Irregular"; several stories, including "The Quallsford Inheritance" and "The Glendower Conspiracy", feature Jones and Holmes. These were followed by a series of stories featured in Alfred Hitchcock's Mystery Magazine starring Biggle's Victorian sleuth, Lady Sara Varnley.

Some of Biggle's science fiction and mystery stories were nominated for the 1962 Hugo for short fiction and also for the Locus Readers awards in 1972, 1973, and 1974. He published two dozen books as well as magazine stories and numerous articles. His last novel was The Chronocide Mission. He was writing almost to the moment of his death. "I can write them faster than the magazines can publish them," he once said, and indeed, magazines continued to publish backlogged stories of his well after his death. Few of his works have been in print since the early 2000s, but most of his novels are available as e-books.

Biggle was the founding secretary-treasurer of the Science Fiction Writers of America and served as chairman of its trustees for many years. In the 1970s, he founded the Science Fiction Oral History Association, which built archives containing hundreds of cassette tapes of science fiction notables making speeches and discussing aspects of their craft. He numbered many of these science fiction notables among his friends, and his article in the July/August 2002 Analog Magazine, "Isaac Asimov Remembered", was based in part on his personal recollections of that celebrity.

He was a member of the Veterans of Foreign Wars, the Disabled American Veterans, and the Military Order of the Purple Heart.

He died from leukemia and cancer.

== Bibliography ==
=== Series ===
- Jan Darzek
  - All the Colors of Darkness (1963)
  - Watchers of the Dark (1966)
  - This Darkening Universe (1975)
  - Silence is Deadly (1977)
  - The Whirligig of Time (1979)
- Cultural Survey
  - The Still, Small Voice of Trumpets (1968).
  - The World Menders (1971; Serialized in three parts in Analog Science Fiction and Fact)
- Pletcher and Lambert
  - Interface for Murder (1987)
  - A Hazard of Losers (1991)
  - Where Dead Soldiers Walk (1994)
  - Murder Jambalaya (2012)
- Sherlock Holmes
  - The Quallsford Inheritance (1987)
  - The Glendower Conspiracy (1990)
- Lady Sara Varnley Victorian Mystery
  - Byways to Evil (2013)
- Grandfather Rastin Mystery
  - Murder in the Maze (2019)

=== Novels ===
- Hornet's Nest (1959)
- The Angry Espers (1961)
- A Taste of Fire (1959)
- The Fury Out of Time (1965)
- The Light that Never Was (1972)
- Monument (1974)
- Alien Main (1985), by T. L. Sherred and Biggle
- The Chronocide Mission (2002)
- Ordeal by Terror (2013)
- Murder Applied for: A Classic Crime Mystery (2013), by Kenneth Lloyd Biggle and Biggle
- The World That Death Made: A Science Fiction Novel (2013), by Kenneth Lloyd Biggle and Biggle

=== Collections ===
- The Silent Sky (1967)
- The Rule of the Door and Other Fanciful Regulations (1967)
- The Metallic Muse (1972)
- A Galaxy of Strangers (1976)
- The Grandfather Rastin Mysteries (Crippen & Landru, 2007)

=== Anthologies edited ===
- Nebula Award Stories 7 (1972)

=== Short fiction ===
- "Gypped" (1956)
- "...On the Dotted Line" (1957)
- "D.F.C."
- "Cronus of the D.F.C." (1957)
- "Leading Man" (1957)
- "Silence Is Deadly" (1957)
- "The Tunesmith" (1957)
- "Judgement Day" (1958)
- "The Madder They Come" (1958) - Fantastic, June
- "Morgan's Lucky Planet" (1958)
- "On the Double" (1958)
- "Petty Larceny" (1958)
- "Rule of the Door" (1958)
- "Secret Weapon"
- "Bridle Shower" (1958)
- "Spare the Rod" (1958)
- "Who Steals My Mind" (1958) - Fantastic, October
- "Who's on First?" (1958)
- "First Love" (1959)
- "Hornets' Nest" (1959)
- "They Live Forever" (1959)
- "The Botticelli Horror" (1960)
- "Esidarap ot Pirt Dnuor" (1960)
- "Orphan of the Void" (1960)
- "Round Trip to Esidarap" (1960) - originally Esidarap ot Pirt Dnuor
- "Monument" (1961)
- "Still, Small Voice" (1961)
- "The Well of the Deep Wish" (1961)
- "A Slight Case of Limbo" (1963)
- "Wings of Song" (1963)
- "The Perfect Punishment"
- "Pariah Planet" (1965)
- "And Madly Teach" (1966)
- "The Double-Edged Rope" (1967)
- "In His Own Image" (1968)
- "The Frayed String on the Stretched Forefinger of Time" (1971)
- "Whom the Gods Love" (1971)
- "Beachhead in Utopia" (1973)
- "Eye for an Eye" (1974)
- "No Biz Like Show Biz" (1974)
- "What Hath God Wrought!" (1974)
- "The Weariest River" (1978)
- "The King Who Wasn't" (2001)

=== Essays and articles ===
- "Introduction (Rule of the Door and Other Fanciful Regulations)" (1967)
- "Introduction (The Metallic Muse)" (1972)
- "Introduction (Nebula Award Stories No. 7)" (1973)
- "Introduction (A Galaxy of Strangers)" (1976)
- "Quantum Physics and Reality" (1976), with Michael Talbot
- "State of the Art: The Morasses of Academe Revisited" (1978)
