= Theodore S. Drachman =

American novelist

Theodore Solomon Drachman (August 31, 1904 – July 13, 1988) was a public health official and a writer. He was the son of Rabbi Dr. Bernard Drachman.

== Biography ==
Drachman attended the University of Minnesota, where he earned his M.D. in 1938, and then earned an M.S.P.H. at Columbia University in 1941. He was a specialist in preventive medicine and epidemiology. He was deputy health commissioner for Westchester County in New York, and health commissioner for Columbia and Ulster counties in New York between 1946 and 1979. He also worked as a consultant to various health organizations around the world.

Cry Plague! was an early Ace Double, and is well known to science fiction bibliographers as the first Ace Double with a recognizably science-fictional plot. He also wrote one work of non-fiction: The Grande Lapu-Lapu (memoirs) (1972).

Drachman died on July 13, 1988, at the age of 83, at his home in Philmont, New York, of cardiac arrest.

== Writings ==
As an author, Drachman's fiction publications included:

- False Faces (1931)
- Cry Plague! (1953)
- Something for the Birds (1958)
- Addicted to Murder (1960)
- Reason for Madness (1970)
- The Deadly Dream (1982)
