= The Jewels of Aptor =

1962 novel by Samuel R. Delany

- First edition
- Author: Samuel R. Delany
- Cover artist: Jack Gaughan
- Language: English
- Genre: Science Fantasy
- Publisher: Ace Books
- Publication date: 1962
- Publication place: United States
- Media type: Print (Paperback)
- Pages: 156 pp
- OCLC: 1625608

The Jewels of Aptor is a 1962 science fantasy novel by Samuel R. Delany, his first published novel. It first appeared in shortened form as an Ace Double F-173 together with Second Ending by James White.

From the 1968 edition onwards, Delany's original text has been restored, as the first edition was shortened by about fifteen pages for publication in the Ace Double format.

== Plot introduction ==
In a post-atomic future, when civilization has regressed to something near the Middle Ages or even before, a young student and poet, Geo, takes a job as a sailor on a boat. He travels with a strange passenger, a priestess of the goddess Argo, who is heading toward a mysterious land of mutants and high radiation, called Aptor. The journey is presumably made to recapture a young priestess of Argo: her daughter (her little sister in the Ace Double version), who has been kidnapped by the forces of the dark god Hama.

== Sources ==
- Barbour, Douglas (1979). Worlds Out Of Worlds: The SF Novels of Samuel R. Delany. Frome, Somerset, UK: Bran's Head Books Ltd. ISBN 0-905220-13-7.
- Clute, John; Nicholls, Peter (1995). The Encyclopedia of Science Fiction (2 ed.). New York: St. Martin's Griffin. ISBN 0-312-13486-X.
- Pringle, David (1990). The Ultimate Guide to Science Fiction. London: Grafton Books. ISBN 0-246-13635-9.
- Tuck, Donald H. (1974). The Encyclopedia of Science Fiction and Fantasy. Chicago: Advent. p. 137. ISBN 0-911682-20-1.
