= Fritz Leiber bibliography =

This is a bibliography of works by Fritz Leiber.

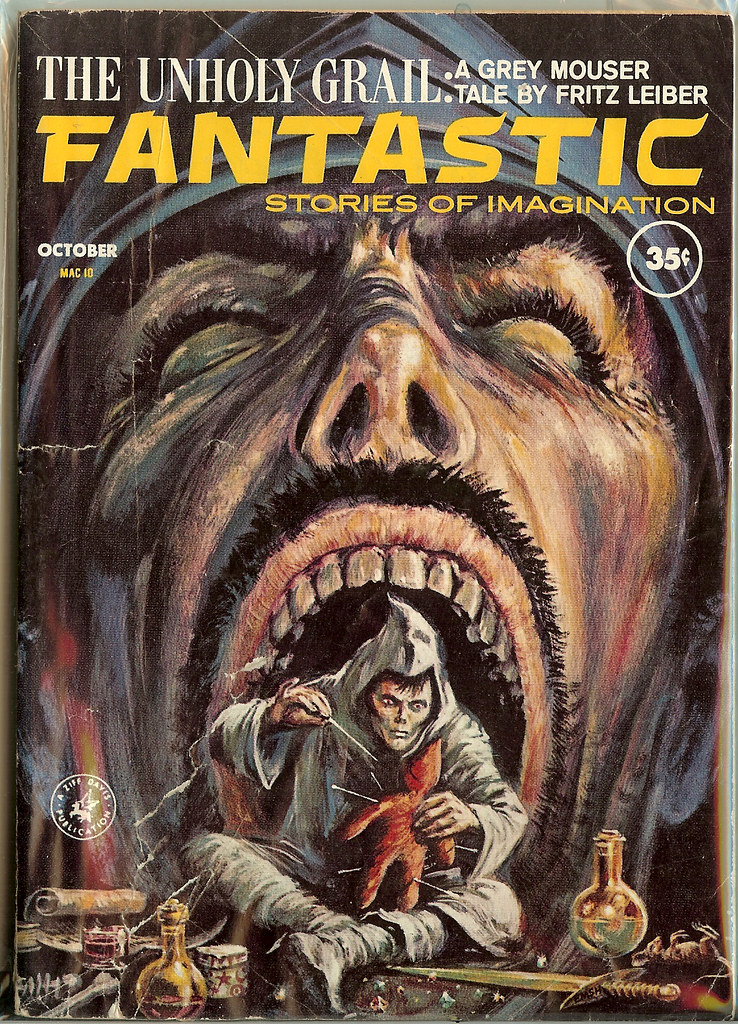
Leiber's only solo Grey Mouser tale, "The Unholy Grail", was the cover story for the October 1962 issue of Fantastic

== Fafhrd and the Gray Mouser series ==
1. Swords and Deviltry (1970). Collection of 3 short works
2. Swords Against Death (1970). Collection of 10 short stories
3. Swords in the Mist (1968). Collection of 6 short stories.
4. Swords Against Wizardry (1968). Collection of 4 short stories.
5. The Swords of Lankhmar (1968) (expanded from "Scylla's Daughter" in Fantastic, 1963)
6. Swords and Ice Magic (1977). Collection of 8 short stories.
7. The Knight and Knave of Swords (1988), retitled Farewell to Lankhmar (1998, US/2000, UK)

=== Omnibuses ===
- Ill Met in Lankhmar (White Wolf Publishing, 1995, ISBN 1-56504-926-8), collects 1 and 2)
- Lean Times in Lankhmar (White Wolf Publishing, 1996, ISBN 1-56504-927-6) combines 3 and 4
- Return to Lankhmar (White Wolf Publishing, 1997, ISBN 1-56504-928-4) combines 5 and 6
- The Three Swords *books 1-3)
- The Sword's Masters (books 4-6)

== Novels and Novellas ==
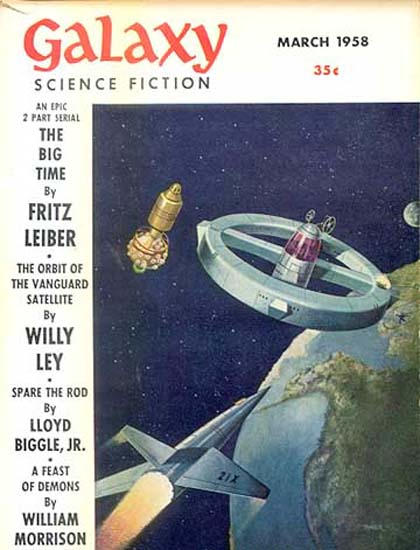
The Big Time was serialized in Galaxy Science Fiction in 1958

- Conjure Wife (originally appeared in Unknown Worlds, April 1943)
- Gather, Darkness! (serialized in Astounding, May, June, and July 1943)
- Destiny Times Three (1945) (reprinted 1952 as Galaxy Novel number 28)
- The Sinful Ones (1953), an adulterated version of You're All Alone (1950 Fantastic Adventures abridged); revised edition published 1980.
- The Green Millennium (1953)
- The Big Time (expanded 1961 from a version serialized in Galaxy, March and April 1958; Hugo Award for Best Novel) — Change War series
- The Night of the Long Knives (Amazing Science Fiction Stories, January 1960)
- The Silver Eggheads (1961; a shorter version was published in The Magazine of Fantasy & Science Fiction in 1959)
- The Wanderer (1964)
- Tarzan and the Valley of Gold (1966) (novelisation of a Clair Huffaker screenplay, first authorized Tarzan novel by a writer other than Edgar Rice Burroughs)
- A Specter Is Haunting Texas (1969)
- Our Lady of Darkness (1977)
- The Dealings of Daniel Kesserich (1997) (novella written in 1936, then discovered and published posthumously)

== Collections ==
- Night's Black Agents (1947)
- Two Sought Adventure (1957)
- The Mind Spider and Other Stories (1961). Collection of 6 short stories.
- Shadows With Eyes (1962). Collection of 6 short stories.
- A Pail of Air (1964). Collection of 11 short stories.
- Ships to the Stars (1964). Collection of 6 short stories.
- The Night of the Wolf (1966). Collection of 4 short stories.
- The Secret Songs (1968). Collection of 11 short stories.
- Night Monsters (1969). Collection of 4 short stories. UK (1974) edition drops 1 story and adds 4.
- The Best of Fritz Leiber (1974). Collection of 22 short stories.
- The Book of Fritz Leiber (1974). Collection of 10 stories and 9 articles.
- The Second Book of Fritz Leiber (1975). Collection of 4 stories, 1 play, and 6 articles.
- The Worlds of Fritz Leiber (1976). Collection of 22 stories, no overlap with 'Best of' or the two 'Books of'.
- Bazaar of the Bizarre (1978)
- Heroes and Horrors (1978). Collection of 9 stories.
- Ship of Shadows (1979). Collection of 5 short stories and The Big Time. Paperback (1982) drops 1 story.
- Changewar (1983). Collection of the Changewar short stories (7 stories).
- The Ghost Light (1984). Collection of 9 stories with illustrations and an autobiographic essay with photographs.
- The Leiber Chronicles (1990) Collection of 44 short stories.
- Gummitch and Friends (1992). Leiber's cat stories, the first five of which feature Gummitch.
- Dark Ladies (NY: Tor Books, 1999). Omnibus edition of Conjure Wife and Our Lady of Darkness
- The Black Gondolier (2000). Collection of 18 short stories.
- Smoke Ghost and Other Apparitions (2002). Collection of 18 short stories.
- Day Dark, Night Bright (2002). Collection of 20 short stories.
- Horrible Imaginings (2004). Collection of 15 short stories.
- Strange Wonders (Subterranean Press, 2010). Collection of 48 unpublished and uncollected works (drafts, fragments, poems, essays, and a play).

== Plays ==
- Quicks Around the Zodiac: A Farce. (Newcastle, VA: Cheap Street, 1983).

== Short stories ==
1939
"Two Sought Adventure" aka "The Jewels in the Forest" — Fafhrd and Gray Mouser story
1940
"The Automatic Pistol"
"The Bleak Shore" — Fafhrd and Gray Mouser story
1941
"The Howling Tower" — Fafhrd and Gray Mouser story
"The Power of the Puppets"
"Smoke Ghost"
"They Never Come Back"
1942
"The Hill and the Hole"
"The Hound"
"The Phantom Slayer" - aka "The Inheritance"
"Spider Mansion"
"The Sunken Land" — Fafhrd and Gray Mouser story
1943
"The Mutant's Brother"
"Thieves' House" — Fafhrd and Gray Mouser story
"To Make a Roman Holiday"
1944
"Business of Killing"
"Sanity" aka "Crazy Wolf"
"Taboo"
"Thought"
1945
"The Dreams of Albert Moreland"
"Wanted — An Enemy"
1946
"Alice and the Allergy"
"Mr. Bauer and the Atoms"
1947
"Adept's Gambit" — Fafhrd and Gray Mouser story
"Diary in the Snow"
"The Man Who Never Grew Young"
1949
"The Girl with the Hungry Eyes"
"In the X-Ray"
1950
"The Black Ewe"
"Coming Attraction"
"The Dead Man"
"The Enchanted Forest"
"Later Than You Think"
"Let Freedom Ring" aka "The Wolf Pack"
"The Lion and the Lamb"
"Martians, Keep Out!"
"The Ship Sails at Midnight"
"You're All Alone"
1951
"Appointment in Tomorrow" aka "Poor Superman"
"Cry Witch!"
"Dark Vengeance" aka "Claws from the Night" — Fafhrd and Gray Mouser story
"Nice Girl with Five Husbands"
"A Pail of Air"
"When the Last Gods Die"
1952
"Dr. Kometevsky's Day"
"The Foxholes of Mars"
"I'm Looking for "Jeff""
"The Moon Is Green"
"Yesterday House"
1953
"A Bad Day for Sales"
"The Big Holiday"
"The Night He Cried"
"The Seven Black Priests" — Fafhrd and Gray Mouser story
1954
"The Mechanical Bride" (play)
"The Silence Game"
1957
"The Big Trek"
"Femmequin 973"
"Friends and Enemies"
"Last"
"Time Fighter"
"Time in the Round"
"What's He Doing in There?"
1958
"The Big Time" (short novel) — Change War story
"Bread Overhead"
"Bullet With His Name"
"A Deskful of Girls" — Change War story
"The Last Letter"
"Little Old Miss Macbeth"
"Rump-Titty-Titty-Tum-TAH-Tee"
"Space-Time for Springers" — first Gummitch story
"Try and Change the Past" — Change War story

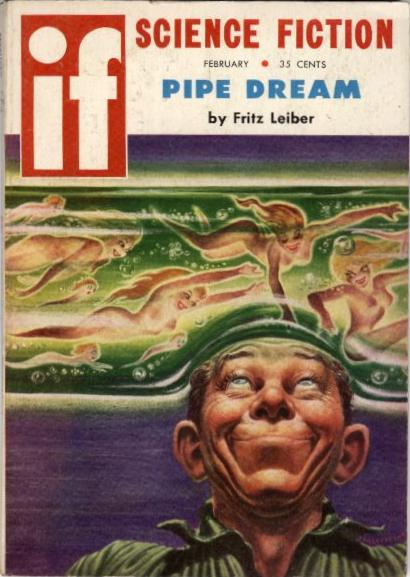
"Pipe Dream" was the cover story for the February 1959 issue of If, illustrated by Kelly Freas

1959
"Damnation Morning" — Change War story
"The House of Mrs. Delgado"
"The Improper Authorities"
"Lean Times in Lankhmar" — Fafhrd and Gray Mouser story
"The Number of the Beast" — Change War story
"The Mind Spider" — Cthulhu Mythos story
"MS Found in a Maelstrom"
"Our Saucer Vacation"
"Pipe Dream"
"Psychosis from Space"
"The Reward"
"The Silver Eggheads" (novella, later expanded to book length)
"Tranquility, Or Else!" aka "The Haunted Future"

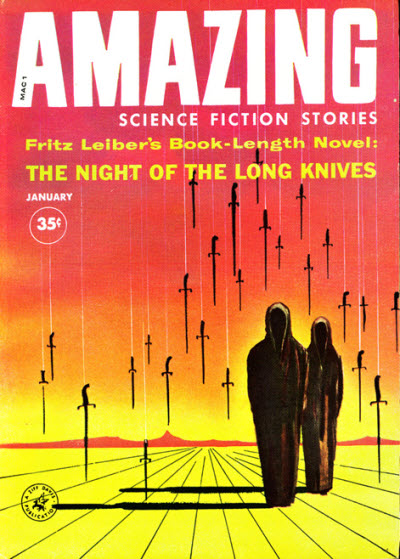
"The Night of the Long Knives" took the cover of the January 1960 issue of Amazing Stories

1960
"Deadly Moon"
"Mariana"
"The Night of the Long Knives" aka "The Wolf Pair"
"The Oldest Soldier" — Change War story
"Rats of Limbo"
"Schizo Jimmie"
"When the Sea-King's Away" — Fafhrd and Gray Mouser story

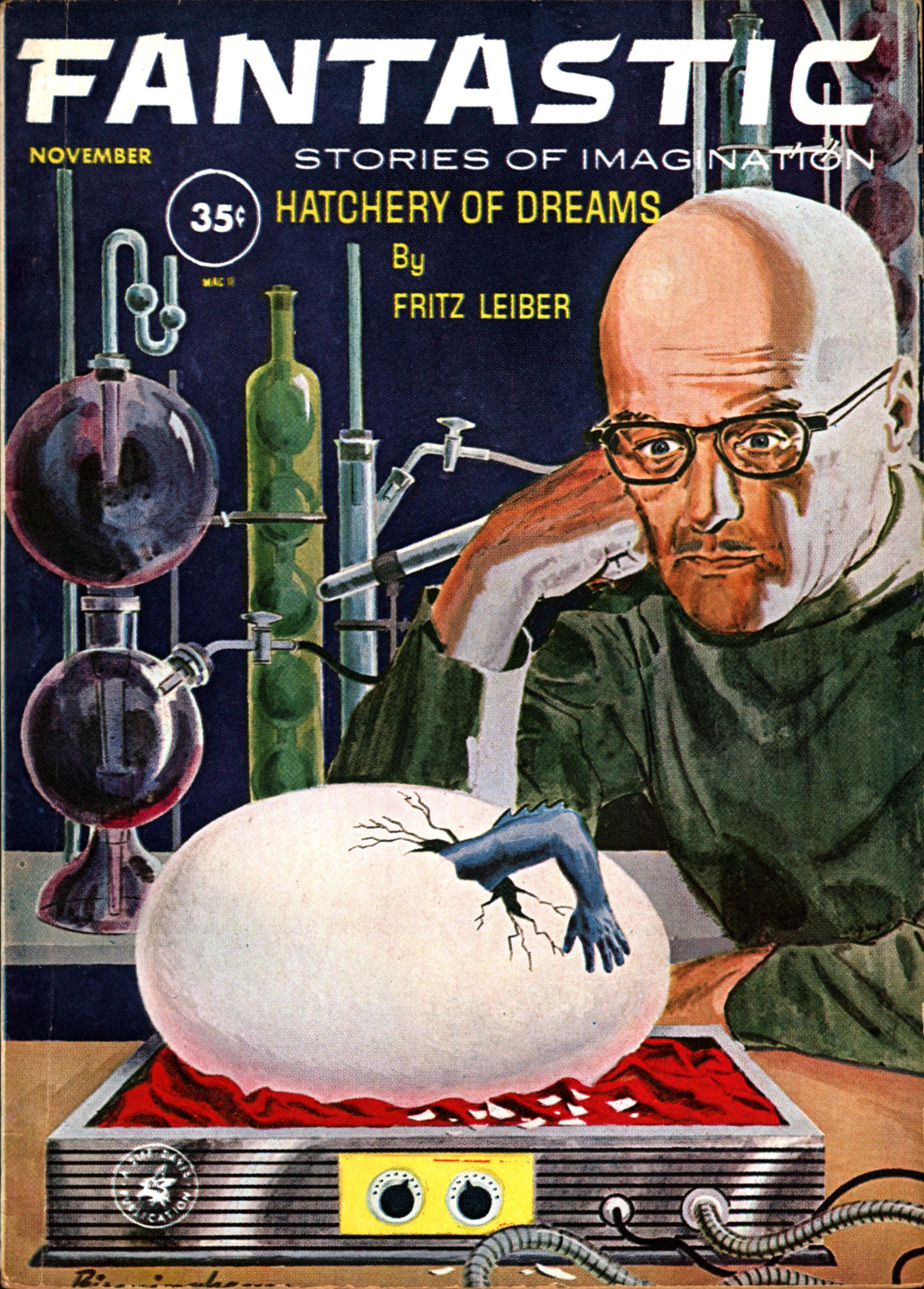
Leiber's "Hatchery of Dreams" was the cover story on the November 1961 issue of Fantastic

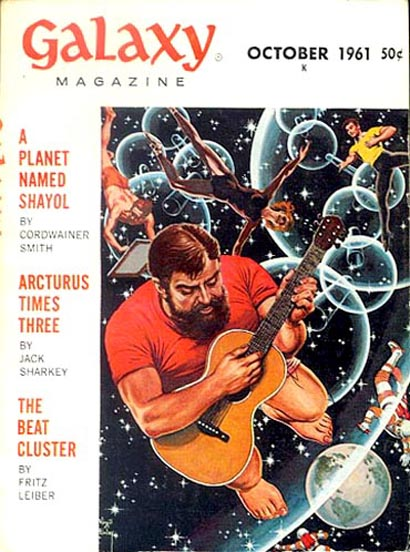
"The Beat Cluster" took the cover of the October 1961 Galaxy Science Fiction

1961
"All the Weed in the World"
"The Beat Cluster"
"The Goggles of Dr. Dragonet"
"Hatchery of Dreams"
"Kreativity for Kats" — Gummitch story
"Scream Wolf"
"Scylla's Daughter" — Fafhrd and Gray Mouser story
"A Visitor from Back East"
1962

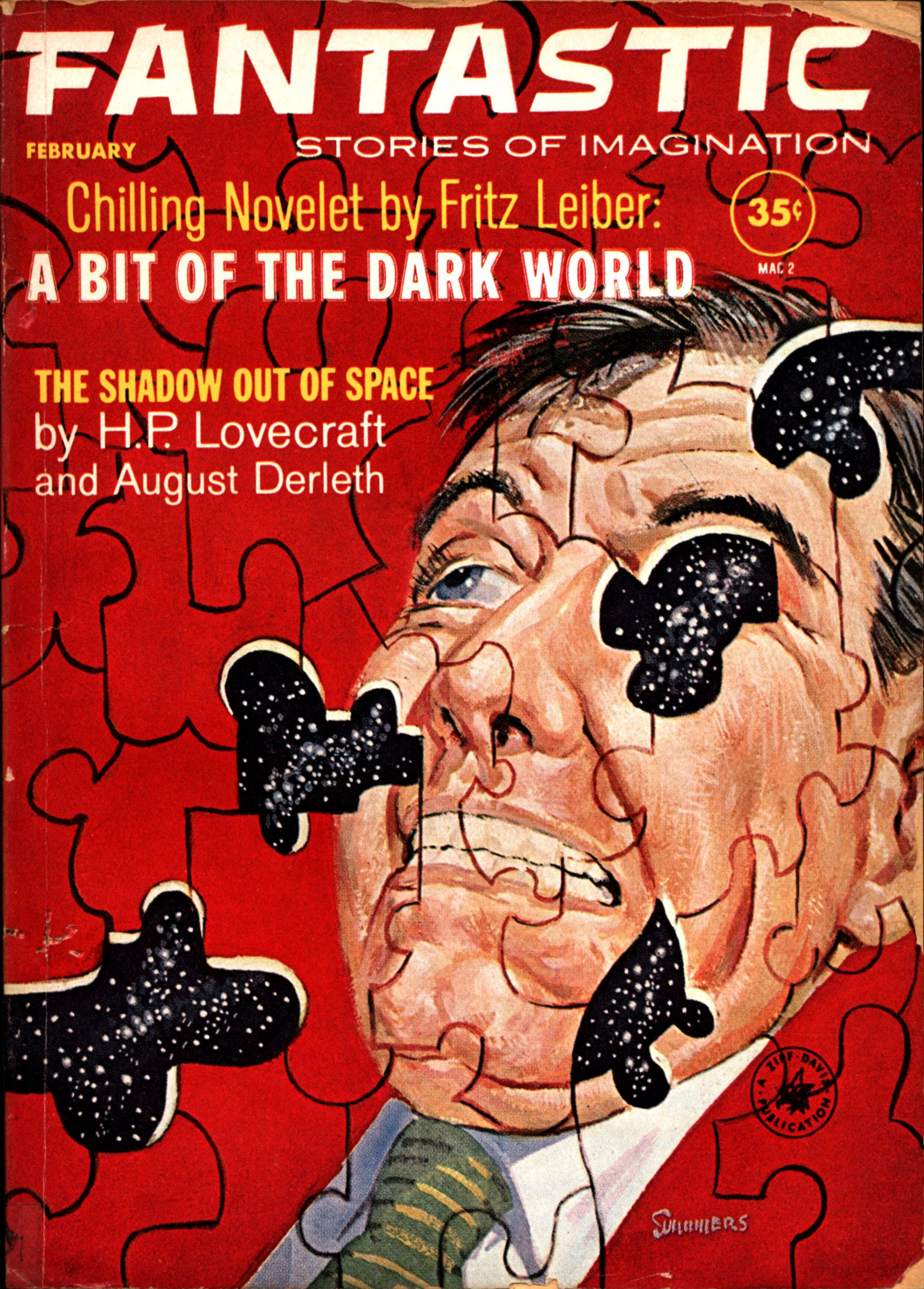
Leiber's novelette "A Bit of the Dark World" took the cover of the February 1962 issue of Fantastic

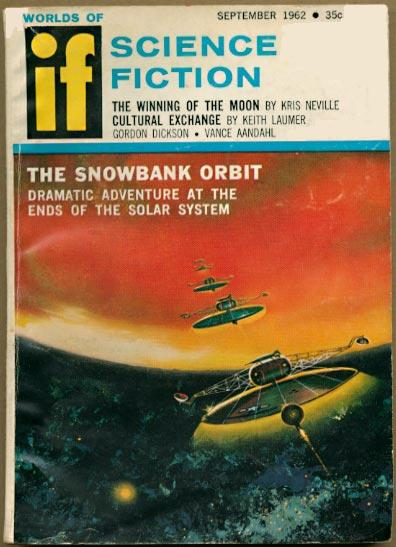
Leiber's "The Snowbank Orbit" was the cover story for the September 1962 issue of If

"The 64-Square Madhouse"
"The Big Engine" (shortened revision of "You're All Alone")
"A Bit of the Dark World"
"The Creature from Cleveland Depths" aka "The Lone Wolf"
"The Man Who Made Friends with Electricity"
"Mirror"
"The Moriarty Gambit"
"The Secret Songs"
"The Snowbank Orbit"
"The Thirteenth Step"
"The Unholy Grail" — Gray Mouser story
1963

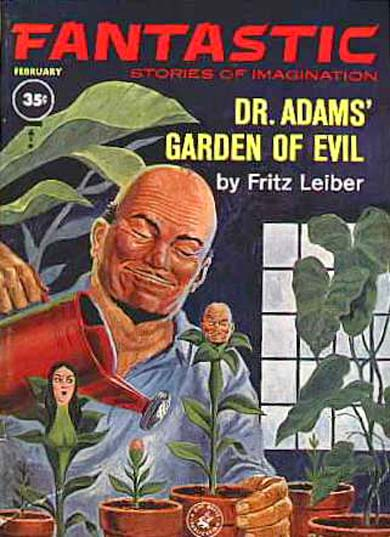
Leiber's "Dr. Adams' Garden of Evil" took the cover of the February 1963 issue of Fantastic

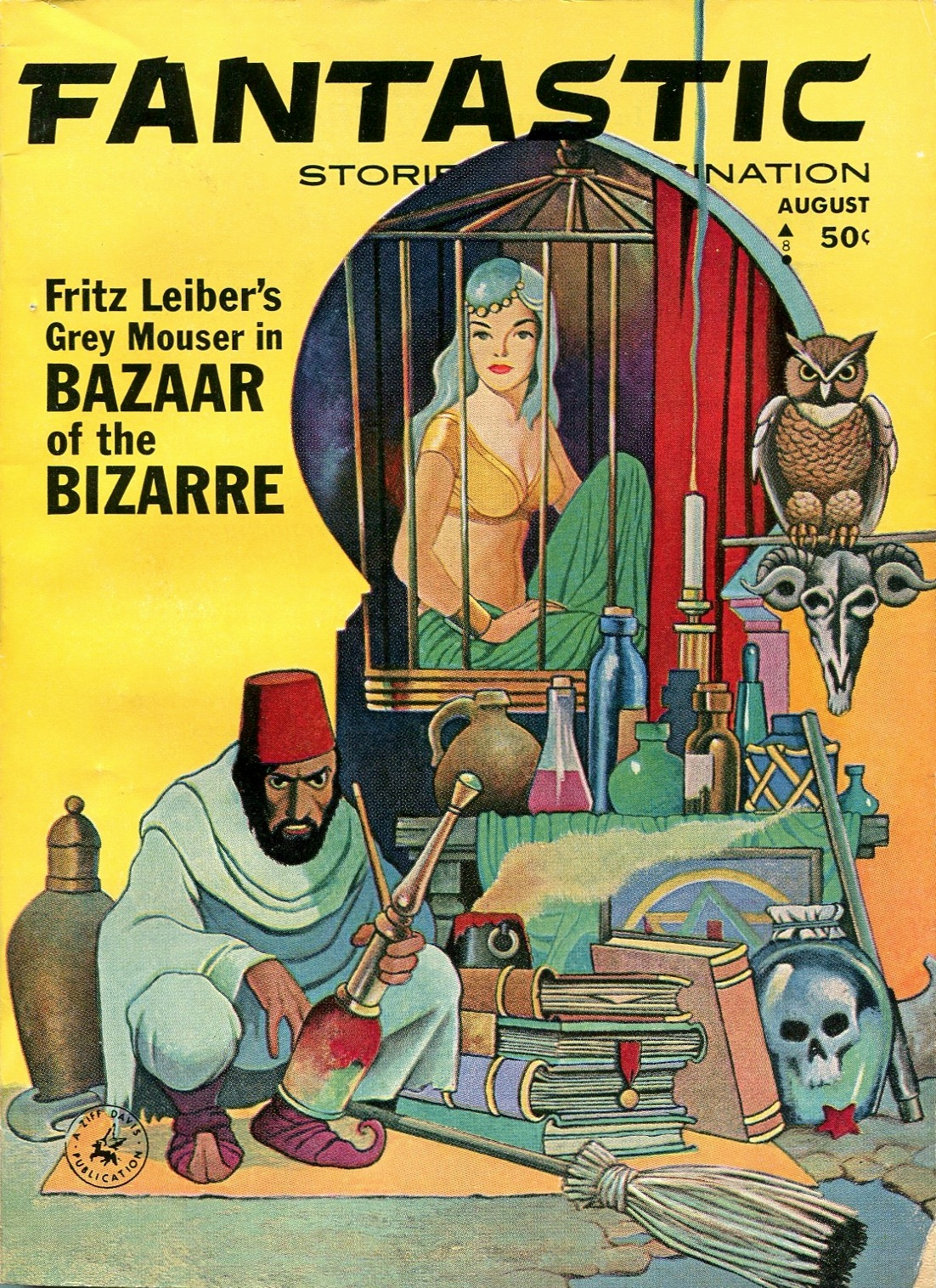
Leiber's novelette "Bazaar of the Bizarre" was the cover story for the August 1963 issue of Fantastic

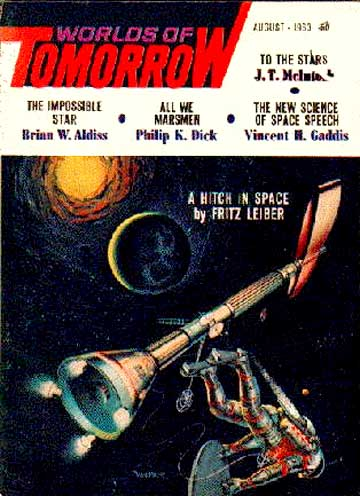
Leiber's "A Hitch in Space" took the cover of the August 1963 issue of Worlds of Tomorrow

"237 Talking Statues, Etc."
"Bazaar of the Bizarre" — Fafhrd and Gray Mouser story
"The Casket-Demon"
"The Cloud of Hate" — Fafhrd and Gray Mouser story
"Crimes Against Passion"
"Dr. Adams' Garden of Evil"
"Game for Motel Room"
"A Hitch in Space"
"Kindergarten"
"Myths My Great-Granddaughter Taught Me"
"No Great Magic" — Change War story
"The Spider"
"Success"
"X Marks the Pedwalk"
1964
"Be of Good Cheer"
"The Black Gondolier"
"Lie Still, Snow White"
"The Lords of Quarmall" (with Harry O. Fischer) — Fafhrd and Gray Mouser story
"Midnight in the Mirror World"
"When the Change-Winds Blow" — Change War story
1965
"Cyclops"
"Far Reach to Cygnus"
"Four Ghosts in Hamlet"
"The Good New Days"
"Knight's Move" aka "Knight to Move" — Change War story
"Moon Duel"
"Stardock" — Fafhrd and Gray Mouser story
1966
"The Crystal Prison"
"Sunk Without Trace"
"To Arkham and the Stars" — a Cthulhu Mythos story
1967
"Answering Service"
"Black Corridor" — Change War story
"Gonna Roll the Bones" - winner of Hugo and Nebula awards.
"The Inner Circles" aka "The Winter Flies"
1968
"Crazy Annaoj"
"In the Witch's Tent" — Fafhrd and Gray Mouser story
"One Station of the Way"
"A Specter is Haunting Texas"
"The Square Root of Brain"
"Their Mistress, the Sea" — Fafhrd and Gray Mouser story
"The Turned-off Heads"
"The Two Best Thieves in Lankhmar" — Fafhrd and Gray Mouser story
"When Brahma Wakes"
"The Wrong Branch" — Fafhrd and Gray Mouser story
1969
"Endfray of the Ofay"
"Richmond, Late September, 1849"
"Ship of Shadows"
"When They Openly Walk"
1970
"America the Beautiful"
"The Circle Curse" — Fafhrd and Gray Mouser story
"Ill Met in Lankhmar" — Fafhrd and Gray Mouser story
"The Price of Pain-Ease" — Fafhrd and Gray Mouser story
"The Snow Women" — Fafhrd story
1971
"Gold, Black, and Silver"
1972
"Another Cask of Wine"
"The Bump"
"Day Dark, Night Bright"
"The Lotus Eaters"
1973
"The Bait" — Fafhrd and Gray Mouser story
"Cat Three"
"The Sadness of the Executioner" — Fafhrd and Gray Mouser story
"Trapped in the Shadowland" — Fafhrd and Gray Mouser story
1974
"Beauty and the Beasts" — Fafhrd and Gray Mouser story
"Cat's Cradle" — Gummitch story
"Do You Know Dave Wenzel?"
"Midnight by the Morphy Watch"
"Mysterious Doings in the Metropolitan Museum"
"WaIF"
1975
"Belsen Express"
"Catch That Zeppelin!"
"The Glove"
"Night Passage"
"Trapped in the Sea of Stars" — Fafhrd and Gray Mouser story
"Under the Thumbs of the Gods" — Fafhrd and Gray Mouser story
1976
"Dark Wings"
"The Death of Princes"
"The Eeriest Ruined Dawn World"
"The Frost Monstreme" — Fafhrd and Gray Mouser story
"The Terror from the Depths" — a Cthulhu Mythos story
1977
"The Princess in the Tower 250,000 Miles High"
"Rime Isle" — Fafhrd and Gray Mouser story
"A Rite of Spring"
"Sea Magic" — Fafhrd and Gray Mouser story
1978
"Black Glass"
"The Mer She" — Fafhrd and Gray Mouser story
1979
"The Button Molder"
"The Man Who Was Married to Space and Time"
1980
"The Repair People"
1981
"The Great San Francisco Glacier"
1982
"Horrible Imaginings"
"The Moon Porthole"
1983
"The Cat Hotel" — Gummitch story
"The Curse of the Smalls and the Stars" — Fafhrd and Gray Mouser story
1984
"Black Has Its Charms"
"The Ghost Light"
1988
"The Mouser Goes Below" — Fafhrd and Gray Mouser story
"Slack Lankhmar Afternoon Featuring Hisvet" — excerpt from "The Mouser Goes Below"
1990
"Replacement for Wilmer: A Ghost Story"
1993
"Thrice the Brinded Cat"
2002
"The Enormous Bedroom"
