= Swords Against Wizardry =

Short story collection by Fritz Leiber

- cover art from first edition
- Author: Fritz Leiber
- Cover artist: Jeff Jones
- Language: English
- Series: Fafhrd and the Gray Mouser series
- Genre: Fantasy
- Publisher: Ace Books
- Publication date: 1968
- Publication place: United States
- Media type: Print (Paperback)
- Pages: 188 p.
- Preceded by: Swords in the Mist
- Followed by: The Swords of Lankhmar

Swords Against Wizardry is a fantasy short story collection, first published 1968, by Fritz Leiber and Harry Fischer, featuring their sword and sorcery heroes Fafhrd and the Gray Mouser. Fischer's contribution was limited to ten thousand words of The Lords of Quarmall. The book is chronologically the fourth volume of the complete seven-volume edition of the collected stories devoted to the characters. It was first published in paperback format during 1968 by Ace Books company, which reprinted the title numerous times up to October 1990; later paperback editions were issued by ibooks (2003) and Dark Horse (2007). It has been published in the United Kingdom by Grafton (1986). The first hardcover edition was issued by Gregg Press during December 1977.

The book has been collected, along with others in the series, in various omnibus editions: Swords' Masters (1990), Lean Times in Lankhmar (1996), The First Book of Lankhmar (2001), and Lankhmar (2008).

The book collects four short stories, three of which were originally published in the magazines Fantastic for November 1965 and August 1968 and Fantastic Stories of Imagination for January and February 1964, and one of which first appeared in the book itself.

== Contents ==
- "In the Witch's Tent" (1968)
- "Stardock" (1965)
- "The Two Best Thieves in Lankhmar" (1968)
- "The Lords of Quarmall" (1964)

== Plot ==
The Fafhrd and Gray Mouser stories concern the lives of two larcenous but likable rogues as they adventure across the fantasy world of Nehwon. In Swords Against Wizardry the duo consult a witch regarding an upcoming adventure ("In the Witch's Tent"); ascend Stardock, the Nehwonian Everest, in search of treasure ("Stardock"); are revealed, as their gains are stolen from them, not to be the best thieves in Lankhmar, as they so smugly deem themselves ("The Two Best Thieves in Lankhmar"); and take service with two opposing claimants to the sorcerous throne of the ancient city of Quarmall ("The Lords of Quarmall").

== Relation to other works ==
"The Two Best Thieves in Lankhmar" includes an appearance by Joanna Russ's heroine Alyx.

== Awards ==
"Stardock" was nominated for the 1966 Hugo Award for Short Fiction.
