= Lankhmar (disambiguation) =

Lankhmar is a fictional city created by Fritz Leiber. It can also mean:

- Lankhmar (board game) - a fantasy board wargame published by TSR in 1976
- Lankhmar – City of Adventure - an accessory for Dungeons & Dragons published by TSR in 1985
