= Swords in the Mist =

Book by Fritz Leiber

- cover art from first edition
- Author: Fritz Leiber
- Cover artist: Jeff Jones
- Language: English
- Series: Fafhrd and the Gray Mouser series
- Genre: Fantasy
- Publisher: Ace Books
- Publication date: 1968
- Publication place: United States
- Media type: Print (Paperback)
- Pages: 190
- Preceded by: Swords Against Death
- Followed by: Swords Against Wizardry

Swords in the Mist is a fantasy short story collection, first published in 1968, by American writer Fritz Leiber, featuring his sword and sorcery heroes Fafhrd and the Gray Mouser. It is chronologically the third volume of the complete seven volume edition of the collected stories devoted to the characters. It was first published in paperback format during 1968 by Ace Books company, which reprinted the title numerous times through September 1990; later paperback editions were issued by ibooks (2003) and Dark Horse (2007). It has been published in the United Kingdom by Mayflower Books (1979) and Grafton (1986, 1987). The first hardcover edition was issued by Gregg Press during December 1977. The book has also been gathered together with others in the series into various omnibus editions; The Three of Swords (1989), Lean Times in Lankhmar (1996), The First Book of Lankhmar (2001), and Lankhmar (2008).

The book collects six short stories, of which three were originally published in the magazines Fantastic Stories of Imagination for May 1963 and Fantastic Science Fiction Stories for November 1959 and May 1960, one was published originally in the collection Night's Black Agents (1947), and two first appeared in the book itself.

== Contents ==
- "The Cloud of Hate" (1963)
- "Lean Times in Lankhmar" (1959)
- "Their Mistress, the Sea" (1968)
- "When the Sea-King's Away" (1960)
- "The Wrong Branch" (1968)
- "Adept's Gambit" (1947)

== Plot ==
The Fafhrd and Gray Mouser stories concern the lives of two larcenous but likable rogues as they adventure across the fantasy world of Nehwon. In Swords in the Mist the duo confronts the mystically concentrated hate of the citizens of Lankhmar ("The Cloud of Hate"), go their separate ways during a period of difficult times, with the Mouser becoming an enforcement thug and Fafhrd an acolyte of a newly introduced religion ("Lean Times in Lankhmar"), recuperate after their reconciliation with a sea voyage ("Their Mistress, the Sea"), invade the boudoir of an absent sea deity ("While the Sea-King's Away"), flee his wrath by traversing a passage to another world ("The Wrong Branch"), and there perform a bizarre quest towards the Castle of Mist to break a curse placed upon them. ("Adept's Gambit").
