= Swords Against Death =

Short story collection by Fritz Leiber

- cover art from first edition
- Author: Fritz Leiber
- Cover artist: Jeff Jones
- Language: English
- Series: Fafhrd and the Gray Mouser series
- Genre: Fantasy
- Publisher: Ace Books
- Publication date: 1970
- Publication place: United States
- Media type: Print (Paperback)
- Pages: 251 p.
- Preceded by: Swords and Deviltry
- Followed by: Swords in the Mist

Swords Against Death is a fantasy short story collection by American writer Fritz Leiber, first published in 1970 and featuring his sword and sorcery heroes Fafhrd and the Gray Mouser. It is chronologically the second volume of the complete seven volume edition of the collected stories devoted to the characters. It is an expansion of Leiber's earlier collection Two Sought Adventure, issued by Gnome Press during 1957. The earlier collection contained seven of the ten stories of Swords Against Death, plus an "Induction" omitted from the expanded edition, which was instead republished in its companion volume, Swords and Deviltry (1970). Swords Against Death was first published in paperback during 1970 by Ace Books, which reprinted the title numerous times through August 1990; later paperback editions were issued by ibooks (2003) and Dark Horse (2007). It has been published in the United Kingdom by New English Library (1972), Mayflower Books (1979) and Grafton (1986). The first hardcover edition was issued by Gregg Press during December 1977. The book has also been gathered together with others of the series into various omnibus editions; The Three of Swords (1989), Ill Met in Lankhmar (1995), The First Book of Lankhmar (2001), and Lankhmar (2008).

The book collects ten short stories, eight of which were originally published in the magazines Unknown for August 1939, Unknown Worlds for February 1942 and February 1943, Unknown Fantasy Fiction for November 1940, and June 1941, Other Worlds Science Stories for May 1953, Suspense for Fall 1951, and Fantastic Stories of Imagination for August 1963, and two of which first appeared in the book itself.

== Contents ==
- "The Circle Curse" (1970)
- "The Jewels in the Forest" (1939; originally titled "Two Sought Adventure")
- "Thieves' House" (1943)
- "The Bleak Shore" (1940)
- "The Howling Tower" (1941)
- "The Sunken Land" (1942)
- "The Seven Black Priests" (1953)
- "Claws from the Night" (1951; originally titled "Dark Vengeance")
- "The Price of Pain-Ease" (1970)
- "Bazaar of the Bizarre" (1963)

== Plot ==
The Fafhrd and Gray Mouser stories concern the lives of two larcenous but likable rogues as they adventure across the fantasy world of Nehwon. The stories in Swords Against Death concern the duo as they leave Lankhmar after the deaths of their first loves, only to find their resolution never to return pointless ("The Circle Curse"). There follow a miscellaneous series of adventures from their wanderings, including a quest for treasure in a dwelling with unique defenses ("The Jewels in the Forest"), a return bout with the Thieves' Guild they hold responsible for their ladies' deaths ("Thieves' House"), an ensorcelled journey to a far-away land ("The Bleak Shore"), an encounter with a beast-haunted stranger ("The Howling Tower"), a dangerous visit to the Nehwonian equivalent of Atlantis ("The Sunken Land"), a conflict with a murderous priesthood ("The Seven Black Priests"), a magical plague afflicting Lankhmar ("Claws from the Night"), a final parting with their deceased loves in the Shadowland ("The Price of Pain-Ease"), and an investigation of a mysterious shop that is other than it seems ("Bazaar of the Bizarre").

== Prequel ==
The events of Robin Wayne Bailey's authorized Fafhrd and Gray Mouser novel, Swords Against the Shadowland (1998), occur approximately between Swords and Deviltry and this book, including some of the same time as "The Circle Curse".
