= Swords and Deviltry =

Short story collection by Fritz Leiber

- First edition
- Author: Fritz Leiber
- Cover artist: Jeff Jones
- Language: English
- Series: Fafhrd and the Gray Mouser series
- Genre: Fantasy
- Publisher: Ace Books
- Publication date: 1970
- Publication place: United States
- Media type: Print (Paperback)
- Pages: 254 p.
- Followed by: Swords Against Death

Swords and Deviltry is a fantasy short story collection, first published 1970, by American writer Fritz Leiber, featuring his sword and sorcery heroes Fafhrd and the Gray Mouser. It is chronologically the first volume of the complete seven volume edition of the collected stories devoted to the characters. The book was first published in paperback form during 1970 by Ace Books company, which reprinted the title numerous times through November 1985; later paperback editions were issued by ibooks (2003) and Dark Horse (2006). It has been published in the United Kingdom by New English Library (1971), Mayflower Books (1979) and Grafton (1986, 1988). The first hardcover edition was issued by Gregg Press during December 1977. The book has also been gathered together with others in the series into various omnibus editions; The Three of Swords (1989), Ill Met in Lankhmar (1995), The First Book of Lankhmar (2001), and Lankhmar (2008).

The book collects three short stories originally published in the magazines Fantastic for April 1970, Fantastic Stories of Imagination for October 1962, and The Magazine of Fantasy and Science Fiction for April 1970, together with an "Induction" that originally appeared in the 1957 Fafhrd and Gray Mouser collection Two Sought Adventure (later expanded, minus the induction, as Swords Against Death (1970).

== Contents ==
- "Induction" (1957)
- "The Snow Women" (1970)
- "The Unholy Grail" (1962)
- "Ill Met in Lankhmar" (1970)

== Plot ==
The Fafhrd and Gray Mouser stories concern the lives of two larcenous but likable rogues as they adventure across the fantasy world of Nehwon. The stories in Swords and Deviltry introduce the duo and their relationship ("Induction"), present incidents from their early lives in which they meet their first lady-loves (Fafhrd in "The Snow Women", the Gray Mouser in "The Unholy Grail"), and relate how afterwards in the city of Lankhmar the two met and allied themselves with each other, and lost their first loves through their defiance of the local Thieves' Guild ("Ill Met in Lankhmar").

== Awards ==
"Ill Met in Lankhmar" won the 1970 Nebula Award and the 1971 Hugo Award for best novella. "The Unholy Grail" was nominated for the 1963 Hugo Award for Short Fiction.

== Sequel ==
Robin Wayne Bailey later wrote an authorized sequel to this book, Swords Against the Shadowland (1998).
