= Rogues in Lankhmar =

- Genre: Role-playing games
- Publisher: TSR

Rogues in Lankhmar is an accessory for the 2nd edition of the Advanced Dungeons & Dragons fantasy role-playing game based on Fritz Leiber's Lankhmar setting.

== Contents ==
A block of adventure hooks follows each guild, NPC, and location description. The last chapter offers tips for handling hard-to-please players.

== Publication history ==
Rogues in Lankhmar was written by Wes Nicholson and published by TSR, Inc. The cover art was by Larry Elmore.

== Reception ==
Rick Swan reviewed Rogues in Lankhmar for Dragon magazine #216 (April 1995). He comments that "Dungeon Masters who've enjoyed the previous volumes in the Lankhmar series (including Tales of. . . and Slayers of. . .) but still don't know how to get a campaign off the ground should appreciate the focused approach of the latest entry." He felt that the adventure hooks would help in "making it a snap for DMs to develop encounters geared to the interests of their players". Swan concludes by saying, "The result: sophisticated, intelligent role-playing for those more interested in negotiating treaties than scalping orcs."
