= The Swords of Lankhmar =

Novel by Fritz Leiber

- cover art from first edition
- Author: Fritz Leiber
- Cover artist: Jeff Jones
- Language: English
- Series: Fafhrd and the Gray Mouser series
- Genre: Fantasy
- Publisher: Ace Books
- Publication date: 1968
- Publication place: United States
- Media type: Print (Paperback)
- Pages: 224 p.
- Preceded by: Swords Against Wizardry
- Followed by: Swords and Ice Magic

The Swords of Lankhmar is a fantasy novel, first published 1968, by Fritz Leiber, featuring his sword and sorcery heroes Fafhrd and the Gray Mouser. It is chronologically the fifth volume of the complete seven volume edition of the collected stories devoted to the characters. The book is an expansion of Leiber's earlier novella "Scylla's Daughter", which was published originally in the magazine Fantastic Stories of Imagination for May 1961. The full novel first published in paperback format during 1968 by Ace Books company, which reprinted the title numerous times through 1986; a later paperback edition was issued by Dark Horse (2008). It has been published in the United Kingdom by Mayflower Books (1970) and Grafton (1986, 1987). The first hardcover edition was issued by Rupert Hart-Davis during June 1969; a later hardcover edition was issued by Gregg Press during December 1977. The book has also been gathered together with others in the series into various omnibus editions; Swords' Masters (1990), Return to Lankhmar (1997), and The Second Book of Lankhmar (2001).

== Plot ==
The Fafhrd and Gray Mouser stories concern the lives of two larcenous but likable rogues as they adventure across the fantasy world of Nehwon. In The Swords of Lankhmar, the duo is hired by the city of Lankhmar to protect its grain fleets, which have become prey to a mysterious threat. A sea serpent ridden by an explorer from another world is encountered, but the true foes prove to be legions of intelligent rats. Returning to Lankhmar, the protagonists find the whole city besieged by the rats. The Mouser, magically shrunken to rat size, spies out their plans, but the rats' victory appears certain until an intervention by the Gods of Lankhmar and the rats' own ancient enemies occurs.

== Awards ==
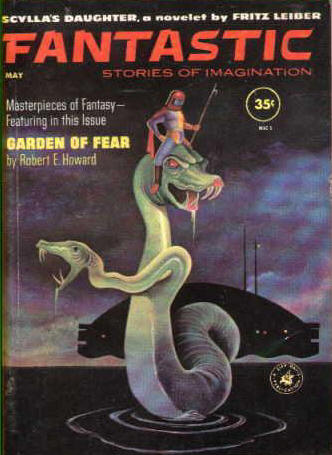
"Scylla's Daughter" was the cover story for the May 1961 issue of Fantastic

"Scylla's Daughter" was nominated for the 1962 Hugo Award for Short Fiction.
