= Bazaar of the Bizarre (short story collection) =

- Cover of the first edition
- Author: Fritz Leiber
- Illustrator: Stephan Peregrine
- Cover artist: Stephan Peregrine
- Language: English
- Series: Fafhrd and the Gray Mouser
- Genre: Fantasy short stories
- Publisher: Donald M. Grant, Publisher, Inc.
- Publication date: 1978
- Publication place: United States
- Media type: Print (hardback)
- Pages: 127 pp
- OCLC: 4476225

Bazaar of the Bizarre is a collection of fantasy short stories by American writer Fritz Leiber. It was first published in 1978 by Donald M. Grant, Publisher, Inc. in an edition of 1,350 copies. The stories feature Leiber's characters Fafhrd and the Gray Mouser and originally appeared in the magazine Fantastic. The stories were previously published in book form in the complete collected edition of Fafhrd and Mouser stories in the same order, as the final piece in Swords Against Death and the first two in Swords in the Mist.

== Contents ==
- Introduction
- "Bazaar of the Bizarre"
- "The Cloud of Hate"
- "Lean Times in Lankhmar"
