= Alyx =

Alyx may refer to:

- The Adventures of Alyx, a 1976 collection of feminist science fiction stories by American writer Joanna Russ
- Alyx Vance, a non-player character in Valve's 2004 first-person shooter video game Half-Life 2
- Half-Life: Alyx, a 2020 virtual reality first-person shooter developed and published by Valve
- 1017 Alyx 9SM, originally Alyx, a fashion brand co-founded by Matthew Williams
