= The Knight and Knave of Swords =

Short story collection by Fritz Leiber

- dust cover art from first edition
- Author: Fritz Leiber
- Cover artist: Thomas Canty
- Language: English
- Series: Fafhrd and the Gray Mouser series
- Genre: Fantasy
- Publisher: William Morrow
- Publication date: 1988
- Publication place: United States
- Media type: Print (hardcover)
- Pages: 303
- ISBN: 0-688-08530-X
- Preceded by: Swords and Ice Magic

The Knight and Knave of Swords is a fantasy short story collection by American writer Fritz Leiber, first published in 1988, featuring his sword and sorcery heroes Fafhrd and the Gray Mouser. It is chronologically the seventh and last volume of the complete seven volume edition of the collected stories devoted to the characters. It was first published in hardcover format during December 1988 by William Morrow and Company, and in paperback format during February 1990 by Ace Books company; it was later reissued with the title Farewell to Lankhmar in both hardcover and paperback formats by White Wolf company (1998, 1999); the most recent later paperback edition, from Dark Horse (2008), reverted to the original title. It has been published in the United Kingdom by Grafton (1990, 1991) and Gollancz (2000); the latter adopted the title used by the White Wolf editions. The book has also been gathered together with others in the series into the omnibus edition The Second Book of Lankhmar (2001).

The book collects four short stories, the first three originally published in the magazine The Dragon Magazine for December 1977, the collection Heroes and Horrors (1978), and the anthology Heroic Visions (1983). The fourth was originally published as two stories, "The Mouser Goes Below" in the magazine Whispers #23 (1987), and "Slack Lankhmar Afternoon Featuring Hisvet," in the anthology Terry's Universe (1988), which were combined for publication in the collection.

== Contents ==
- "Sea Magic" (1977)
- "The Mer She" (1978)
- "The Curse of the Smalls and the Stars" (1983)
- "The Mouser Goes Below" (1987, 1988)

== Plot ==
The Fafhrd and Gray Mouser stories concern the lives of two larcenous but likable rogues as they adventure across the fantasy world of Nehwon. In The Knight and Knave of Swords the duo has settled permanently on Rime Isle with their new wives, their followers assuming the role of peaceful traders. The first two stories concentrate on this settling-in process, while the final two deal with various magical curses and afflictions suffered by the protagonists.

== Awards ==
The Knight and Knave of Swords was nominated for the 1989 World Fantasy Award for Best Collection.
