= Swords and Ice Magic =

Short story collection by Fritz Leiber

- cover art from first edition
- Author: Fritz Leiber
- Cover artist: Michael Whelan
- Language: English
- Series: Fafhrd and the Gray Mouser series
- Genre: Fantasy
- Publisher: Ace Books
- Publication date: 1977
- Publication place: United States
- Media type: Print (Paperback)
- Pages: 243
- ISBN: 0-441-79166-2
- Preceded by: The Swords of Lankhmar
- Followed by: The Knight and Knave of Swords

Swords and Ice Magic is a fantasy short story collection, first published in 1977, by American writer Fritz Leiber, featuring his sword and sorcery heroes Fafhrd and the Gray Mouser. It is chronologically the sixth volume of the complete seven volume edition of the collected stories devoted to the characters. It was first published in paperback format during July 1977 by Ace Books company, which reprinted the title numerous times through 1990; a later paperback edition was issued by Dark Horse (2007). It has been published in the United Kingdom by Mayflower Books and Grafton (1986, 1987). The first hardcover edition was issued by Gregg Press during December 1977. The book has also been gathered together with others in the series into various omnibus editions; Swords' Masters (1990), Return to Lankhmar (1997), and The Second Book of Lankhmar (2001).

The book collects seven short stories and one novella, three of which were published originally in the anthologies Flashing Swords! #1 (1973) and Flashing Swords! #3: Warriors and Wizards (1976), the collections The Book of Fritz Leiber (1974) and The Second Book of Fritz Leiber (1975), and the magazines Fantastic for November 1973 and April 1975, Whispers for December 1973, and Cosmos Science Fiction and Fantasy for May and July 1977. "The Frost Monstreme" and "Rime Isle" have also been published separately as the novel Rime Isle (1977).

While the stories were ostensibly assembled in chronological order by the author, internal evidence indicates that the third, "Trapped in the Shadowland", which is a direct sequel to the preceding volume, The Swords of Lankhmar, should actually have been placed first.

== Contents ==
- "The Sadness of the Executioner" (1973)
- "Beauty and the Beasts" (1974)
- "Trapped in the Shadowland" (1973)
- "The Bait" (1973)
- "Under the Thumbs of the Gods" (1975)
- "Trapped in the Sea of Stars" (1975)
- "The Frost Monstreme" (1976)
- "Rime Isle" (1977)

== Plot ==
The Fafhrd and Gray Mouser stories concern the lives of two larcenous but likable rogues as they adventure across the fantasy world of Nehwon. In Swords and Ice Magic the duo face a series of challenges from Death of greater or lesser subtlety ("The Sadness of the Executioner", "Beauty and the Beasts", "Trapped in the Shadowland" and "The Bait"), the pique of deities they formerly worshiped whose names they now rarely even use in vain ("Under the Thumbs of the Gods"), a voyage to the strange equatorial ocean of Nehwon ("Trapped in the Sea of Stars"), and recruitment to succor Nehwon's Iceland, the legendary Rime Isle, menaced by Sea Mingols and a pair of refugee gods ("The Frost Monstreme", "Rime Isle").

== Relation to other works ==
"Under the Thumbs of the Gods" includes an appearance by Joanna Russ's heroine Alyx.

== Reception ==
C. Ben Ostrander reviewed Swords and Ice Magic in The Space Gamer No. 12. Ostrander commented that "Included in this book are some of the very best Fafhrd & Gray Mouser stories written. Mr. Leiber's stories help shape the growing field of fantasy literature, and I expect to see the stories in this volume re-written by aspiring writers, and get printed. But remember, Fritz Leiber did it first, and better."

=== Awards ===
Swords and Ice Magic was nominated for the 1978 World Fantasy Award for Best Anthology/Collection.
