= The Adventures of Alyx =

1976 collection of short stories by Joanna Russ

- 1983 paperback edition (publ. Timescape Books)
- Author: Joanna Russ
- Original title: Alyx
- Cover artist: Kevin Eugene Johnson
- Language: English
- Genre: Fantasy, science fiction
- Publisher: Gregg Press
- Publication date: June 1976
- Publication place: United States
- Media type: Print (hardback & paperback)
- Pages: xxiv + 265
- ISBN: 0-8398-2337-1
- OCLC: 2119642

The Adventures of Alyx is a 1976 collection of feminist science fiction stories by American writer Joanna Russ, initially titled Alyx by Gregg Press in hardback without a dustjacket. It was published in 1983 with the title The Adventures of Alyx by Timescape Books.

It is composed of five stories:

- "Bluestocking" (1967, as "The Adventuress" in Orbit 2) begins in the fantasy city of Ourdh. Alyx is hired by a young noblewoman to help the latter escape from an arranged marriage.
- "I Thought She Was Afeard Till She Stroked My Beard" (1967, as "I Gave Her Sack and Sherry" in Orbit 2) describes Alyx's escape from an abusive marriage to become a pirate.
- "The Barbarian" (1968 in Orbit 3) takes place again in Ourdh. Alyx, the titular barbarian, is employed by a sorcerer with little regard for human life.
- Picnic on Paradise (1968, novel) presents Alyx as an agent of the Trans-Temporal Authority. Having been accidentally rescued from drowning in the bay of Tyre by a "time-scoop", she is employed to guide a group of ill-prepared vacationers across the treacherous landscape of an alien world.
- "The Second Inquisition" (1970 in Orbit 6) takes place in 1925. In it, a young woman befriends an odd visitor, who is eventually revealed to be a time-traveling granddaughter of Alyx. The Trans-Temporal Authority of "Picnic on Paradise" is explicitly mentioned.

These stories display elements of science fiction cloaked in fantasy in a similar way to work by Mary Gentle, who has cited them as an influence.

The eponymous heroine, Alyx, is (intentionally) described with different attributes across the different stories, although she remains reasonably constant inasmuch as she is depicted as a realistic human being, not the clichéd fantasy woman prevalent across much of the genre.

== Fictional character biography ==
The details of Alyx's birth and early life are not described. By seventeen, she was married to an abusive man, apparently one of some social standing. After retaliating and striking the man to death, she joins a group of smugglers and pirates. At some point later, she is living in the hills above Ourdh. As part of an evangelical group devoted to the hill-god Yp, she comes to Ourdh. Her co-religionists are persecuted, and Alyx comes to the conclusion that the religion is ridiculous. By thirty, she is still living in Ourdh, working as a pick-lock, among other things. (She mentions that she had a daughter, and they were estranged, with her daughter hating her) She helps a wealthy young woman named Edarra escape from an arranged marriage to an unpleasant and possibly murderous widower. They travel some distance away from the city by sea.

Some time later, Alyx is back in Ourdh, working as an assassin. She has, in the meantime, married. She enters the employ of a sorcerer. Recognizing his cruelty and malevolence, she destroys him.

Later, in Tyre, Alyx steals from the prince and is put to death by drowning. By coincidence, she's picked up by a time travel device being used by archaeologists in the distant future, the Trans-Temporal Authority. As the only living thing ever recovered by time travel, and a relic of a hardier age, she is employed for her expertise in outdoor survival. Overdosing on an unidentified drug during one of these assignments leaves her with temporary hallucinations of a dead lover.

Alyx grows in influence in the Trans-Temporal Authority and apparently reshapes the agency, leading to a rift between its members.

Her granddaughter also becomes a time-traveler and participates in this conflict.

== References to other works ==
"Bluestocking" includes a reference to Fritz Leiber's character Fafhrd. Alyx recalls "A big Northman with hair like yours and a gold-red beard--God, what a beard!--Fafnir, no, Fafh--well, something ridiculous. But he was far from ridiculous. He was amazing". She describes a volatile week-long tryst with him.

Alyx makes cameo appearances in several of Leiber's Fafhrd and the Gray Mouser stories. In "The Two Best Thieves in Lankhmar", (1968) she is referred to as "Alyx the pick-lock", a thief active in Lankhmar despite the Thieves' Guild barring women from the trade. In "Under the Thumbs of the Gods", (1970) Fafhrd and the Gray Mouser encounter their former lovers during an otherworldly experience. Alyx and Fafhrd's affair is mentioned.

In 1976, Leiber published a promotional article for the Lankhmar war game in The Dragon #1. In passing, he mentions Alyx as having "penetrate[d] Nehwon," apparently from some other world.

== References in other media ==
Through her appearances in stories about Fafhrd and the Gray Mouser, Alyx is mentioned briefly in TSR's Lankhmar – City of Adventure (1992), and Mongoose's Fritz Leiber's Lankhmar (2006). Both of these are roleplaying game products.

== Sources ==
- Clute, John and Peter Nicholls. The Encyclopedia of Science Fiction. New York: St. Martin's Griffin, 1993 (2nd edition 1995). ISBN 0-312-13486-X.
