= The Snow Women =

1970 novella by Fritz Leiber

"The Snow Women" was originally published in the April 1970 issue of Fantastic, under a cover painted by Jeff Jones

"The Snow Women" is a sword and sorcery novella by American writer Fritz Leiber, recounting the early history of Fafhrd, a future member of the adventurous duo Fafhrd and the Gray Mouser. It was nominated for the Hugo and Nebula Awards in 1971 (although Leiber withdrew it in favor of "Ill Met in Lankhmar"), and finished second in the annual Locus poll for short fiction.

First published in 1970 in Fantastic magazine, it's in the nature of a prequel, as Leiber had by that time been chronicling the pair's adventures for thirty years. The story forms part two of the collection Swords and Deviltry.

== Plot summary ==
Fafhrd an eighteen-year-old youth rescues Vlana, a dancer, from the frozen snowballs of the Snow Clan women, who are led by his own mother. The Snow Clan live within the plains of the Cold Waste, but, once every year, they travel south to the Cold Corner, where they trade with merchants and attend the Show performed by a troop of traveling actors. Fafhrd, who dreams of learning more about civilization, warns Vlana of a plot by a male member of the clan, Hringorl, to kidnap her. He wants to travel south with her. Vlana agrees but leaves with Vellix and runs into an ambush where she is saved by Fafhrd for a second time. They leave the Cold Waste for the southern kingdoms.

== Characters ==
- Fafhrd, a tall youth with long reddish blonde hair.
- Mor, mother of Fafhrd and leader of the Snow Clan women.
- Vlana, dancer of the traveling troup who is running from the Thieves Guild.
- Essidinix, Master of the Show.
- Vellix the Venturer, with whom Vlana tries to escape being captured, and who is killed during the ambush set up by Hringorl.
- Hringorl, pirate chief who seeks to kidnap Vlana.
- Mara, the young Snow Clan woman pregnant with Fafhrd's child.
- Hor, accomplice of Hringorl.
- Harrax, accomplice of Hringorl.
- Hrey, accomplice of Hringorl.
- Zax and Effendrit, Mingol traders who had been friends of Fafhrd's late father.

== Location ==
The Cold Wastes are a part of the ancient world of Nehwon.
