= Fafhrd and the Gray Mouser =

Characters by Fritz Leiber

Fafhrd and the Gray Mouser series
- Two Sought Adventure, the first published story collection exclusively featuring Fafhrd and the Gray Mouser, published by Gnome Press in 1958
- Swords and Deviltry (1970); Swords Against Death (1970); Swords in the Mist (1968); Swords Against Wizardry (1968); The Swords of Lankhmar (1968); Swords and Ice Magic (1977); The Knight and Knave of Swords (1988)
- Author: Fritz Leiber
- Country: United States
- Genre: Sword and sorcery
- Published: 1939–1988
- No. of books: 7

Fafhrd and the Gray Mouser
- First appearance: Two Sought Adventure, 1939
- Created by: Fritz Leiber

In-universe information
- Species: Human
- Gender: Male
- Occupation: Barbarian (Fafhrd); Thief (Gray Mouser)

Fafhrd and the Gray Mouser are two sword-and-sorcery heroes appearing in stories written by American author Fritz Leiber. They are the protagonists of what are probably Leiber's best-known stories. One of his motives in writing them was to have fantasy heroes he believed were closer to true human nature than the likes of Howard's Conan the Barbarian or Burroughs's Tarzan.

Fafhrd is an almost 7 feet (2.1 m) tall northern barbarian, with the skills of both swordsmanship and singing. The Mouser is an around 5 feet (1.5 m) mercurial thief, who often uses a sword in one hand and a long dagger or main-gauche in the other, and is also a former wizard's apprentice who retains some magical ability. Fafhrd talks like a romantic, but his strength and practicality often prevail, while the cynical-sounding Mouser is prone to showing unexpected sentiment. Both are rogues living in a cutthroat world who spend a lot of time drinking, feasting, wenching, brawling, stealing, and gambling. While they are usually unselective about who hires their swords, they retain a level of morality and enjoyment in adventure.

The characters were loosely modeled upon Leiber himself and his friend Harry Otto Fischer. Fischer initially created them in a letter to Leiber in September 1934, naming at the same time their home city of Lankhmar. In 1936, Leiber finished the first Fafhrd and Gray Mouser novella, "Adept's Gambit", and began work on a second, "The Tale of the Grain Ships". At the same time, Fischer was writing the beginning of "The Lords of Quarmall". "Adept's Gambit" would not see publication until 1947, while "The Lords of Quarmall" would be finished by Leiber and published in 1964. His second story, "The Tale of the Grain Ships", would become the prototype for "Scylla's Daughter" (1961) and, later, the novel The Swords of Lankhmar (1968).

The stories of Fafhrd and the Gray Mouser respectively were only loosely connected until the 1960s, when Leiber organized them chronologically and added additional material in preparation for paperback publication.

Starting as young men, the two separately meet their female lovers, meet each other, and lose both their lovers in the same night, which explains both their friendship and the arrested adolescence of their lifestyles. In later stories, the two mature, learn leadership, and eventually settle down with new partners on the Iceland-like Rime Isle. The novels have many picaresque elements, and are sometimes described as picaresque on the whole.

== Setting ==
Map drawn by Jim Cawthorn to illustrate the stories by Fritz Leiber

The majority of the stories are set in the fictional world of Nehwon ("nehw on", or "Nowhen" backwards: contrasted to Samuel Butler's 1872 Erewhon). Many of them take place in and around its greatest city, Lankhmar. It is described as "a world like and unlike our own". Theorists in Nehwon believe that their world may be shaped like a bubble, floating in the waters of eternity.

Sundered from us by gulfs of time and stranger dimensions dreams the ancient world of Nehwon with its towers and skulls and jewels, its swords and sorceries. Nehwon's known realms crowd about the Inner Sea: northward the green-forested fierce Land of the Eight Cities, eastward the steppe-dwelling Mingol horsemen and the desert where caravans creep from the rich Eastern Lands and the River Tilth. But southward, linked to the desert only by the Sinking Land and further warded by the Great Dike and the Mountains of Hunger, are the rich grain fields and walled cities of Lankhmar, eldest and chiefest of Nehwon's lands. Dominating the Land of Lankhmar and crouching at the silty mouth of the River Hlal in a secure corner between the grain fields, the Great Salt Marsh, and the Inner Sea is the massive-walled and mazy-alleyed metropolis of Lankhmar, thick with thieves and shaven priests, lean-framed magicians and fat-bellied merchants—Lankhmar the Imperishable, the City of the Black Toga.

—From "Induction" by Fritz Leiber

In The Swords of Lankhmar, it is revealed that Nehwon is just one of many worlds in a multiverse when Fafhrd and the Mouser join forces with a German explorer named Karl Treuherz who is looking for his spacecraft, which he uses to cross the boundaries between parallel dimensions in his hunt for new animals to feature at a zoo.

Technology in Nehwon varies between the Iron Age and medieval. Leiber wrote of Lankhmarts: "They may be likened to the Romans or be thought of as, if I may use such a term, southern medievals." On the topic of his Eastern Lands, he wrote: "think of Saracens, Arabs, Parthians, Assyrians even. They ride the camel and elephant, and use the bow extensively."

The series includes several side characters who support the dual protagonists. The two who most influence—and, some would say, cause the most trouble—for Fafhrd and the Gray Mouser are their sorcerous advisers, Ningauble of the Seven Eyes and Sheelba of the Eyeless Face (see Ningauble and Sheelba, below). These two lead the heroes into some of their adventures.

== Publication history ==
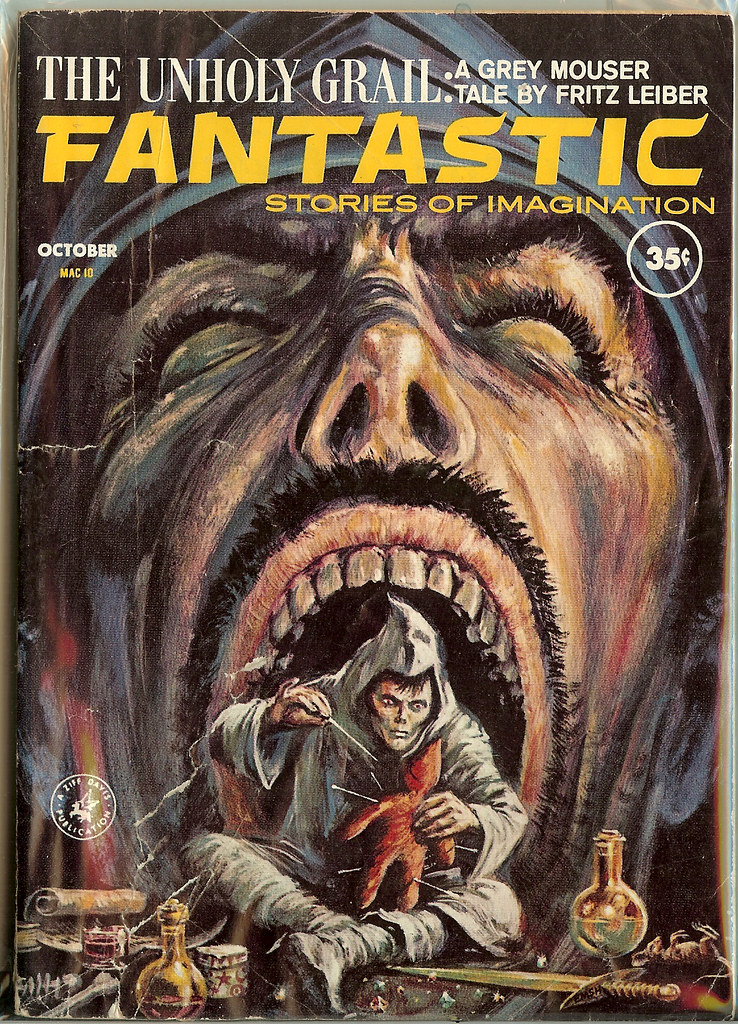
Leiber's only solo Gray Mouser tale, "The Unholy Grail", was the cover story for the October 1962 issue of Fantastic.

The first story, "Two Sought Adventure", appeared in Unknown in August 1939; The last in The Knight and Knave of Swords in 1988. Although Leiber credited his friend Harry Otto Fischer with the original concepts for his characters, it was Leiber who wrote nearly all the stories. Ten thousand words of "The Lords of Quarmall" were penned by Fischer early in the development of the series; the story was completed by Leiber in 1964. Fischer also wrote "The Childhood and Youth of the Gray Mouser", published in 1978. The stories' style and tone vary considerably, but nearly all contain an often dark sense of humor, which ranges from the subtle and character-based to the Pythonesque.

The stories have been collected in the "Swords" series:

1. Swords and Deviltry (collection 1970)
  1. "Induction" (vignette 1957, Two Sought Adventure)
  2. "The Snow Women" (novella 1970 Fantastic)
  3. "The Unholy Grail" (novelette 1962 Fantastic)
  4. "Ill Met in Lankhmar" (novella 1970 F&SF)—telling how Fafhrd and the Mouser met, this story won both a Nebula Award and a Hugo Award
2. Swords Against Death (collection 1970, expanded and revised from Two Sought Adventure 1957)
  1. "The Circle Curse" (1970, first publication)
  2. "The Jewels in the Forest" (novelette 1939 Unknown, as "Two Sought Adventure")
  3. "Thieves' House" (novelette 1943 Unknown)
  4. "The Bleak Shore" (1940 Unknown)
  5. "The Howling Tower" (1941 Unknown)
  6. "The Sunken Land" (1942 Unknown)
  7. "The Seven Black Priests" (novelette 1953 Other Worlds)
  8. "Claws from the Night" (novelette 1951 Suspense as "Dark Vengeance")
  9. "The Price of Pain-Ease" (1970, first publication)
  10. "Bazaar of the Bizarre" (novelette 1963 Fantastic)
3. Swords in the Mist (collection 1968)
  1. "The Cloud of Hate" (1963 Fantastic)
  2. "Lean Times in Lankhmar" (novelette 1959 Fantastic)
  3. "Their Mistress, the Sea" (1968, first publication)
  4. "When the Sea-King's Away" (novelette 1960 Fantastic)
  5. "The Wrong Branch" (1968, first publication)
  6. "Adept's Gambit" (novella 1947, in Leiber's Night's Black Agents collection)
4. Swords Against Wizardry (collection 1968)
  1. "In the Witch's Tent" (1968, first publication)
  2. "Stardock" (novella 1965 Fantastic)
  3. "The Two Best Thieves in Lankhmar" (1968 Fantastic)
  4. The Lords of Quarmall (novella 1964 Fantastic), with Harry Otto Fischer
5. The Swords of Lankhmar (novel 1968—first part published in 1961, as the novella Scylla’s Daughter, on Fantastic)
6. Swords and Ice Magic (collection 1977)
  1. "The Sadness of the Executioner" (1973, in Flashing Swords! #1, ed. Lin Carter)
  2. "Beauty and the Beasts" (vignette 1974, in The Book of Fritz Leiber)
  3. "Trapped in the Shadowland" (1973 Fantastic)
  4. "The Bait" (vignette 1973 Whispers)
  5. "Under the Thumbs of the Gods" (1975 Fantastic)
  6. "Trapped in the Sea of Stars" (1975, in The Second Book of Fritz Leiber)
  7. "The Frost Monstreme" (novelette 1976, in Flashing Swords! #3, ed. Lin Carter)
  8. Rime Isle (novella 1977 Cosmos SF&F Magazine; these last two published together as Rime Isle by Whispers Press in 1977)
7. The Knight and Knave of Swords (collection 1988)
  1. "Sea Magic" (1977 The Dragon)
  2. "The Mer She" (novelette 1983, in Heroes and Horrors)
  3. "The Curse of the Smalls and the Stars" (novella 1983, in Heroic Visions)
  4. "The Mouser Goes Below" (novella 1988, first publication—portions first printed as "The Mouser Goes Below" (1987 Whispers) and "Slack Lankhmar Afternoon Featuring Hisvet" (1988 Terry’s Universe, ed. Beth Meacham))

In 2009, Benjamin Szumskyj's Strange Wonders included the first few chapters of "The Tale of the Grain Ships", written in the 1930s. This unfinished fragment depicts the Gray Mouser in Rome during the reign of the Emperor Claudius.

- The first six books in the series were reprinted in a uniform, archival series from Gregg Press, and were the first hardback editions of all these books save The Swords of Lankhmar.
- Harry Otto Fischer's short story, "The Childhood and Youth of the Gray Mouser", was published in 1978 in The Dragon #18.
- The series was continued by Robin Wayne Bailey in Swords Against the Shadowland (novel, 1998).
- A collection, Bazaar of the Bizarre, illustrated by Stephan Peregrine, comprised Leiber's three favorite Fafhrd and the Gray Mouser stories: "Bazaar of the Bizarre", "The Cloud of Hate", and "Lean Times in Lankhmar".
- A sex scene from The Swords of Lankhmar, cut by editor Don Wollheim, was published in Fantasy Newsletter #49 (July 1982).

=== Omnibus editions ===
Several omnibus editions have also been published:

- Science Fiction Book Club: The Three of Swords (1989; books 1–3) and Swords' Masters (1989; books 4–6).
- White Wolf: Ill Met In Lankhmar (1995; books 1 and 2, with a new introduction by Michael Moorcock and Fritz Leiber's "Fafhrd and Me"), Lean Times in Lankhmar (1996; books 3 and 4, with a new introduction by Karl Edward Wagner), Return to Lankhmar (1997; books 5 and 6, with a new introduction by Neil Gaiman), and Farewell to Lankhmar (1998; book 7; the hardcover edition omits the final seven chapters of "The Curse of the Smalls and the Stars").
- Orion/Millennium's Fantasy Masterworks: The First Book of Lankhmar (2001; books 1–4) and The Second Book of Lankhmar (2001; books 5–7).
- Dark Horse Comics: Fafhrd and the Gray Mouser Omnibus (2024) collects Fafhrd and the Gray Mouser and Fafhrd and the Gray Mouser: The Cloud of Hate and Other Stories

=== Comics adaptations ===
Fafhrd and the Gray Mouser premiering in DC Comics in 1972.

In 1972, Fafhrd and the Mouser began their comics career, appearing in Wonder Woman #202 alongside the title character and Catwoman in a story scripted by award-winning SF writer Samuel R. Delany. In 1973, DC Comics began an ongoing series, Sword of Sorcery, featuring the duo. The title was written by Denny O'Neil and featured art by Howard Chaykin, Walt Simonson and Jim Starlin; the well-received title ran only five issues. Stories included adaptations of "The Price of Pain-Ease", "Thieves' House", "The Cloud of Hate", and "The Sunken Land", as well as original stories. This series was collected by Dark Horse Comics in a trade paperback collection published in June 2008.

In 1991, Marvel Comics published a four-issue comic book adaptation of seven of the stories: "Ill Met in Lankhmar" (issue 1), "The Circle Curse" and "The Howling Tower" (issue 2), "The Price of Pain Ease" and "Bazaar of the Bizarre" (issue 3), and "Lean Times in Lankhmar" and "When the Sea King's Away" (issue 4). The comics were scripted by Howard Chaykin, who had drawn several issues of the earlier DC title, and pencilled by Mike Mignola, whose Hellboy comic book often has a similar feel to Leiber's work. Mignola also did the jacket covers and interior art for the White Wolf collection. This series was collected by Dark Horse Comics in a trade paperback collection published in March 2007.

Marvel Comics created their own version of Fafhrd and the Gray Mouser, when they introduced Fafnir of Vanaheim and his companion Blackrat to the Conan comic series. The pairs of characters were very much alike and Roy Thomas, who wrote the original Conan comics, made no secret that it was his intention to create characters that were a tribute to Fritz Leiber's creations.

=== Games ===
In 1937, Leiber and his college friend Harry Otto Fischer created a complex wargame set within the world of Nehwon, which Fischer had helped to create. Later, they created a simplified board game entitled simply Lankhmar which was released by TSR in 1976. This is a rare case of a game adaptation written by the creators of the stories that the game is based on.

Nehwon, and some of its more interesting inhabitants, are described in the early Dungeons & Dragons supplement Deities and Demigods, and the stories themselves were a significant influence on the role-playing game.

In 1986, Fafhrd and the Gray Mouser were featured in a 1-on-1 Adventure Gamebook set, Dragonsword of Lankhmar. One player controlled Fafhrd and the Gray Mouser, who were trying to find a magical sword beneath an altar (just which one, they were not sure) in Lankhmar. The other player controlled assassins from the local thieves' guild, who were trying to kill the famous rogues for operating in the city without permission from the guild.

== Ningauble and Sheelba ==
Ningauble of the Seven Eyes and Sheelba of the Eyeless Face are two wizards who serve as patrons for Fafhrd and the Mouser. Patron warlock of Fafhrd, Ningauble is so named due to his seven (usually only six visible) glowing eyes, seen roving within, and sometimes projecting from, the hood of his cloak. Along with the Gray Mouser's patron warlock, Sheelba, Ningauble often sends his servant on ludicrous missions such as recovering the Mask of Death or stealing the very stars from the highest mountain. Ningauble's mysterious cavern has obscure space-time portals, which prevent Fafhrd and the Mouser from being sent into other worlds. Ningauble is referred to as the "gossiper of the gods", because of his fondness for stories of an unusual nature (whether or not they are true seems irrelevant) or his sometimes bizarre spies and informants. Ningauble is a mysterious being with a manipulative character, as described in this passage from Adept's Gambit:

Some said that Ningauble had been created by the Elder Gods for men to guess about and to sharpen their imaginations for even tougher riddles. None knew whether he had the gift of foresight, or whether he merely set the stage for future events with such a bewildering cunning that only an efreet or an adept could evade acting the part given him.

The relationship between Fafhrd and Ningauble of the Seven Eyes is captured well in this exchange from The Swords of Lankhmar:

Ningauble shrugged his cloaked, bulbous shoulders. "I thought you were a brave man, addicted to deeds of derring-do." Fafhrd cursed sardonically, then demanded, "But even if I should go clang those rusty bells, how can Lankhmar hold out until then with her walls breached and the odds fifty to one against her?" "I'd like to know that myself," Ningauble assured him. "And how do I get to the temple when the streets are crammed with warfare?" Ningauble shrugged once again. "You're a hero. You should know."

The Mouser's patron, Sheelba of the Eyeless Face, is named for the featureless darkness within his/her hood. In contrast to Ningauble's love of often pointless storytelling, Sheelba is taciturn, choosing his/her words as if they were valuables to be disbursed parsimoniously. That the stoic Fafhrd is paired with the voluble Ningauble, while the story-loving Mouser with the laconic Sheelba is doubly ironic. Sheelba's sigil is an empty oval (presumably signifying an empty hooded face).

Sheelba's gender is ambiguous: Harry Fischer, who first conceived of the character, claimed Sheelba was female, while to Fischer's surprise Leiber referred to Sheelba as male beginning in The Swords of Lankhmar. In fact, Leiber refers to Sheelba as "he" throughout the six books of the series, switching to "she" for the first time only in the last book, The Knight and Knave of Swords, without explanation. Leiber's friend, Frederick MacKnight, who introduced Leiber to Fischer and was involved in the earliest days of the characters, called Sheelba "she-he (or it)". Fischer may have created Sheelba as a tribute to his wife Martha.

While Ningauble dwells in caverns, Sheelba's house is a small hut which strides about the swamps not far from Lankhmar on five chicken leg-like posts, which bend and scuttle like the legs of a great crab or spider. Sheelba's hut is similar in description to the Russian legend of Baba Yaga, which is referenced in other Leiber works such as The Wanderer, where Baba Yaga is the name of a lunar lander.

== Weapons of Fafhrd and the Gray Mouser ==
Fafhrd commonly uses a sword which he names Graywand, a two-hand sword that he's able to use one-handed too (in later stories by necessity). He also carries a poignard named Heartseeker and a short hand-axe which has never been named. For combat at a distance, he often carries a bow and arrow which he wields effectively even while on horseback or at sea, and which he's able to use despite his final handicap (he loses a hand). The Mouser, who in one story is called "the best swordsman in the World", also fights with a pair of weapons: a "slim, curving" sword or sabre called Scalpel, and a dagger called the Cat's Claw, the latter usually hidden in the small of the Mouser's back, and the original of which had a very subtle curve. (It was a straight-bladed weapon by the events of Lean Times in Lankhmar.) As the pair are often divested of their property, these are names they apply to any of their appropriate weapons and not necessarily names of specific ones. They are absolutely not magic weapons: both the wielders are just very able in their use. The Mouser is also an expert with the sling. The Mouser, having been an apprentice magician, can do some very small enchantments, especially while dueling.

== In popular culture ==
Joanna Russ was familiar with and appreciative of the Fafhrd and the Gray Mouser series, and in addition to critical reviews of Leiber, also referenced Fafhrd in her The Adventures of Alyx (1976) sequence as one of Alyx's former lovers in "The Adventuress" (1967; aka "Bluestocking"). Leiber then included Alyx in two Fafhrd and the Gray Mouser stories, "The Two Best Thieves in Lankhmar" (1968) and "Under the Thumbs of the Gods" (1975).

In Terry Pratchett's The Colour of Magic (1983), Fafhrd and the Gray Mouser are parodied as Bravd and the Weasel. Although Ankh-Morpork bears more than a passing resemblance to Lankhmar, Pratchett, known for the use of pastiche in his early works, has been quoted as not intending a direct takeoff.

The characters of Barak and Silk from David Eddings' fantasy series The Belgariad are very similar in both form and personality to Fafhrd and the Gray Mouser respectively.

American author Michael Chabon's Gentlemen of the Road (2007) is a "swashbuckling adventure" novel set in the kaganate of Khazaria (now southwest Russia) around AD 950. It features two similarly physically built adventurers who have a working relationship similar to Fafhrd and the Gray Mouser's – Amram, a hulking Abyssinian proficient with an axe, and the slightly-built swordsman Zelikman, who is Frankish. This pair – both of Jewish origin – become embroiled in a rebellion and a plot to restore a displaced Khazar prince to the throne.

Two characters created by Michael J. Sullivan, Hadrian and Royce, also share a similar relationship to Fafhrd and the Gray Mouser and have similar characteristics and personalities. Sullivan wrote a trilogy of books, Riyria Revelations, originally published as six novellas or books in 2011 and 2012.

A thief character created by Christopher Buehlman in his novel, The Blacktongue Thief, undergoes a similar training to that described in the short story "Ill Met in Lankhmar".

Playing off the visit of Fafhrd and the Gray Mouser to Earth in Adept's Gambit (set in second century B.C. Tyre), Steven Saylor's short story "Ill Seen in Tyre" takes his Roma Sub Rosa series hero Gordianus to the city of Tyre a hundred years later, where the two visitors from Nehwon are remembered as local legends.

The Gray Mouser's dirk "Cat Claw" has appeared as a weapon in several role-playing video games, including early installments of the Final Fantasy series.

In Baldur's Gate, the name "Fafhrd" appears as a password needed to gain entrance into the Thieves' Guild.

In Bethesda's The Elder Scrolls V: Skyrim, when visiting the Ratway in the city of Riften, the first enemies the player meets are a sneaky-looking fellow and a barbarian type called Drahff and Hewnon Black-Skeever. Drahff is an anagram of Fafhrd, "Black-Skeever" is a play on "Gray-Mouser", and Hewnon is an anagram of Nehwon, the world in which Fafhrd and the Gray Mouser live.

In Dodge Roll's Enter the Gungeon, the player can encounter a pair of characters named Frifle and the Grey Mauser, styled to look like the eponymous heroes.

In Jack L. Chalker's And the Devil Will Drag You Under, two characters resembling Fafhrd and the Gray Mouser appear briefly in a tavern with one repeating out loud slightly similar names to Ningauble and Sheelba.
