= Swords Against the Shadowland =

Book by Robin Wayne Bailey

- cover art from first edition
- Author: Robin Wayne Bailey
- Cover artist: Mike Chaney
- Language: English
- Series: Fafhrd and the Gray Mouser series
- Genre: Fantasy
- Publisher: White Wolf
- Publication date: 1998
- Publication place: United States
- Media type: Print (Paperback)
- Pages: 244 p.
- ISBN: 1-56504-893-8
- Preceded by: Swords and Deviltry
- Followed by: Swords Against Death

Swords Against the Shadowland is a fantasy novel by American writer Robin Wayne Bailey, featuring Fritz Leiber's sword and sorcery heroes Fafhrd and the Gray Mouser. It was first published as a trade paperback in August 1998 by White Wolf. A later trade paperback edition was issued by Dark Horse in April 2009. It was projected to be the first in a series of authorized continuations of the Fafhrd and Gray Mouser saga by Bailey. The second was reported to be "currently in progress" in 2008, but has yet to appear.

== Plot ==
The Fafhrd and Gray Mouser stories follow the lives of two larcenous but likable rogues as they adventure across the fantasy world of Nehwon. In Swords Against the Shadowland, our two heroes return to Lankhmar, the city in which they met and in which their first loves, Ivrian and Vlana, met their deaths. There, haunted by their lovers' ghosts, they combat a sorcerous plague cast on the city by a rogue wizard named Malygris, presumably named after the titular evil sorcerer in "The Death of Malygris," a short story by Clark Ashton Smith.

Chronologically, the story falls between the first and second volumes of the complete seven volume edition of Leiber's collected stories devoted to the characters. The story is a direct sequel to "Ill Met in Lankhmar", the last story in Swords and Deviltry, and covers some of the same events as "The Circle Curse", the first story in Swords Against Death.
