= Harry Otto Fischer =

American novelist

- Born: 1910; United States
- Died: 1986 (aged 75–76); United States
- Occupations: Writer, novelist
- Writing career
- Genre: Science fiction

Harry Otto Fischer (1910–1986) was an American science fiction writer and fan best known for helping his college friend Fritz Leiber create the sword and sorcery heroes Fafhrd and the Gray Mouser and their imaginary world of Nehwon.

The fictional heroes were based vaguely on their creators, the barbarian Fafhrd on the tall Leiber, and the thief The Gray Mouser on Fischer. During 1937, Fischer and Leiber designed a board game set in this fantasy world and each began composing a story with the same setting, Fischer's being "The Lords of Quarmall" and Leiber's "The Adventure of the Grain Ships." Neither story was finished until much later; Fischer's work on "The Lords of Quarmall" amounted to 10,000 words of the eventual story, which was finished by Leiber.

The first professional publication of a story featuring the heroes and their setting was "Two Sought Adventure", in Unknown magazine during 1939. This and most subsequent stories featuring the pair were written by Leiber, and all but one were set in the fantasy world Leiber and Fischer created.

The original tales begun by Fischer and Leiber about the pair were completed by Leiber and published during the 1960s. "The Adventure of the Grain Ships" was finally published in the magazine Fantastic as "Scylla's Daughter" during 1961, and was later expanded into the novel The Swords of Lankhmar (1968); "The Lords of Quarmall" was finally published, also in Fantastic, during 1964. Fischer also wrote "The Childhood and Youth of the Gray Mouser," published during 1978 in The Dragon #18.

Fischer and Leiber contributed to the original game design of the board game Lankhmar – published during 1976 by TSR.
