= Two Sought Adventure =

Book by Fritz Leiber

- Dust-jacket from the first edition
- Author: Fritz Leiber
- Cover artist: Lionel Dillon
- Language: English
- Series: Fafhrd and the Gray Mouser
- Genre: Fantasy
- Publisher: Gnome Press
- Publication date: 1957
- Publication place: United States
- Media type: Print (hardback)
- Pages: 186
- OCLC: 1647623

Two Sought Adventure is a 1957 collection of fantasy short stories by American writer Fritz Leiber. It was first published by Gnome Press in 1957 in an edition of 4,000 copies. The collections contains all of Leiber's Fafhrd and the Gray Mouser stories that had been written at the time, with the exception of "Adept's Gambit". The collection was expanded (minus the Induction) and published by Ace Books in 1970 under the title Swords Against Death. (The Induction was reused in a companion volume, Swords and Deviltry.) The stories originally appeared in the magazines Unknown, Other Worlds and Suspense Magazine.

== Contents ==
- "Induction"
- "The Jewels in the Forest"
- "Thieves' House"
- "The Bleak Shore"
- "The Howling Tower"
- "The Sunken Land"
- "The Seven Black Priests"
- "Claws from the Night"

== Plot ==
The Fafhrd and Gray Mouser stories concern the lives of two larcenous but likable rogues as they adventure across the fantasy world of Nehwon. The stories in Two Sought Adventure collect a miscellaneous series of adventures from their wanderings, including a quest for treasure in a dwelling with unique defenses ("The Jewels in the Forest"), a bout with the Thieves' Guild of Lankhmar ("Thieves' House"), an ensorcelled journey to a far-away land ("The Bleak Shore"), an encounter with a beast-haunted stranger ("The Howling Tower"), a dangerous visit to their world's equivalent of Atlantis ("The Sunken Land"), a conflict with a murderous priesthood ("The Seven Black Priests"), and a magical plague afflicting Lankhmar ("Claws from the Night").

== Reception ==
Galaxy Science Fiction called Two Sought Adventure's stories "guaranteed nostalgia evokers ... improbably wonderful adventures".

== Sources ==
- Chalker, Jack L.; Mark Owings (1998). The Science-Fantasy Publishers: A Bibliographic History, 1923–1998. Westminster, MD and Baltimore: Mirage Press, Ltd. p. 306.
- Contento, William G. "Index to Science Fiction Anthologies and Collections".
