= The Unholy Grail =

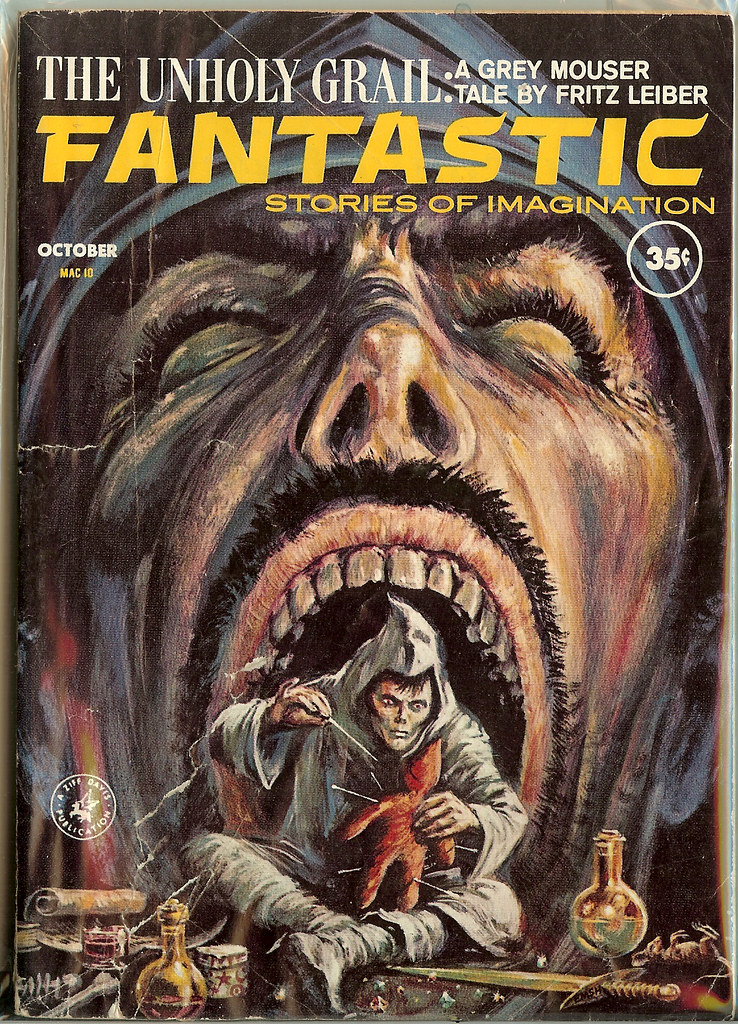
Leiber's only solo Grey Mouser tale, "The Unholy Grail", was the cover story for the October 1962 issue of Fantastic

The Unholy Grail is a sword and sorcery novella by Fritz Leiber, recounting the earliest adventure of the Gray Mouser.

First published in 1962, it is the nature of a prequel, as Leiber had by that time been chronicling the pair's adventures for thirty years. The story forms part three of the collection Swords and Deviltry.

== Plot summary ==
In the forested realm of Duke Janarrl, magic is forbidden. However, Glavas Rho, an exiled wizard, still practices his craft in a forest glade protected by enchantments. His young apprentice, Mouse, still wavering between an allegiance to black or white magic, returns after a long quest, but finds his master dead and their house destroyed. Enraged but saddened, Mouse is arrested by the Duke and his followers. Fortunately, he escapes by invoking a spell which confuses any followers. He also casts a spell on the Duke that will slowly kill him.

Badly wounded, Mouse is discovered by Ivrian, the Duke's daughter, who has also been secretly studying with Glavas Rho. He blames her for betraying him and Glavas Rho. Suddenly, they are both captured by Janarrl, who has Mouse tortured inside the furthest dungeon of his castle. Using the blackest of black magic, in the knowledge that it may rebound on him, Mouse manages to aim a spell at the Duke, using Ivrian as a focus. The Duke dies, his followers flee, and the couple quickly escape into the night.

== Reception ==
"The Unholy Grail" was a finalist for the 1963 Hugo Award for Short Fiction.

The SF Site considered it "exciting".
