= Lankhmar (board game) =

Board game

Cover art by David C. Sutherland III, 1976

Lankhmar is a fantasy board wargame published by TSR in 1976 that is based on both the Swords and Sorcery short stories of Fritz Leiber set in the fictional city of Lankhmar, and on a board game designed by Leiber and Harry Otto Fischer while they were in college.

== Description ==
Lankhmar is a 2–4 player game in which each player takes on the role of a different hero from Fritz Leiber's "Lankhmar" short stories: Fafhrd, the Gray Mouser, Pulgh, or Movarl.

=== Components ===
The game box contains:

- 22" x 28" paper hex grid map of Nehwon
- 224 counters
- 12-page rulebook
- 45 Geas cards
- 45 Reward cards
- six-sided die
- counter storage tray

=== Setup ===
Each player is given one of the four heroes at random, as well as eight warriors, several weapons counters, and horses, boats and/or camels. Each player is assigned one of the four citadels at random. Each player then draws a Geas card to start the game. If the Geas card contains a quest, the player must immediately carry it out but can assign the quest to either the hero or one of the eight warriors.

=== Gameplay ===
On a player's turn the player has the following phases:

- Draw a Geas card. This may be blank. If there are instructions from Sheelba or Ningauble such as "Bring a basket of oats from the Grainfield to Ningauble", then the player must immediately send their hero or a warrior on that quest.
- Move counters. Each unit counter has a movement rate, but this is reduced for each action the counter takes such as changing or picking up weapons.
- If the hero has completed the quest on a Geas card, the player draws a Reward card. Some of these are blank. Most are useful, but few are valuable.
- Engage in combat. All personal combat is resolved with a die roll. A counter that is hit twice is eliminated. A player who loses their hero in combat can still continue the game using any surviving warriors. To successfully attack a citadel, a player must move more units into the citadel than the defender. Once this is accomplished, fighting stops.

=== Optional rules ===
Optional rules can add complexity to combat, add healing to the game, allow resurrection of a dead hero in their home citadel, or introduce the Sinking Lands — a piece of land that sinks beneath the waves and then rises again. Any counters caught on the land when it sinks are removed from the game.

=== Victory conditions ===
The first player to take all of their opponents' citadels is the winner.

== Publication history ==
In 1937, while Fritz Leiber and Harry Otto Fischer were attending University of Louisville, they created the fictional world of Nehwon, and within it the city of Lahkmar (spelled slightly differently than "Lankhmar" in later years.) Leiber and Fischer then created a very large (5 ft x 2½ ft) three-dimensional square-grid diorama of Nehwon, using of layers of corrugated colored paper representing various terrains, and designed a wargame titled Lahkmar to be used with this map. Games were very long, often taking an entire weekend to complete. The game was only played by Leiber, Fischer, and a handful of friends during their time at University of Louisville, and was never published.

In the early 1970s, David Megarry demonstrated the prototype of a board game that he'd developed called The Dungeons of Pasha Cada to Gary Gygax. Gygax, who at the time was freelancing as a game designer for Guidon Games, tried to convince Guidon owner Don Lowry to publish the game. Gygax wrote to Fritz Leiber on Guidon letterhead, seeking permission to use the world of Nehwon for a game that would be a companion to Megarry's game. As Gygax envisioned it, players would have overland adventures in the Leiber-inspired game and underground adventures in Megarry's Dungeon game. Ultimately Lowry turned down the opportunity to publish Megarry's game — he thought the board would be too expensive to print — but Gygax and Leiber continued to correspond about using Lankhmar material in a game. After Gygax co-founded TSR and published Megarry's game as Dungeon! in 1974, Leiber agreed to let TSR use the old Lakhmar game from Leiber's college days as the basis of a new board game.

Gygax, Robert J. Kuntz, and Brad Stock revised the old game, changing the square grid of the original map to the hex grid that had become an industry standard for wargames. The original geography of Leiber's map was retained, but the size of the new map was considerably reduced to 22" x 28". Rules for combat were modernized as well. The new game Lankhmar was published by TSR in 1976 with front cover art by David C. Sutherland III and a blank rear box cover. Second and third printings were released the same year with an image of the box contents and a description of the game on the rear cover. Although Dungeon! was a bestseller for TSR, with several new editions released over the next 40 years, in contrast Lankhmar did not sell well, and was dropped from the TSR catalogue after the third printing.

== Reception ==
In Issue 2 of White Dwarf, Fred Hemmings complained that the game had little to do with Leiber's stories, given that Fafhrd and the Gray Mouser were enemies in this game. He also did not like the use of weapon and transportation counters, which led to teetering stacks of counters for a hero or warrior that was mounted and carrying three weapons. And he found the combat system too reliant on random luck. But he liked the weapon variety, the atmosphere of the game, and the clarity of the rules. He concluded by giving the game a below-average rating of 6 out of 10, saying "The game has its faults [...] despite these and other minor flaws, Lankhmar is a game well worth playing."

In the inaugural issue of Ares (March 1980), Eric Goldberg called this a "simple, lifeless game [that] manages to strip the Leiber stories of interest." He concluded by giving the game a very poor rating of only 3 out of 9, commenting, "The basic mistake committed in Lankhmar is the design approach: the stories depend on a great degree of uncertainty (or mystery), which is absent in the game."

John O'Neill, writing for Black Gate, noted that Fafhrd and the Gray Mouser are partners in Leiber's stories, so "The objective — to capture your opponents’ citadels — makes little sense in the context of the fiction, but was a comfortable fit with 70s board game logic." O'Neill also noted that "Most of the components, including the playing cards and counters, are printed on very flimsy stock. But the map is gorgeous."

== Other reviews and commentary ==
- Panzerfaust and Campaign #76
