= A Specter Is Haunting Texas =

1969 novel by Fritz Leiber

A Specter is Haunting Texas
- First edition cover (hardcover)
- Author: Fritz Leiber
- Illustrator: Jack Gaughan
- Language: English
- Genre: Science fiction
- Publisher: Walker & Co.
- Publication date: 1969
- Publication place: United States
- Media type: Print (hardback & paperback)
- Pages: 245
- OCLC: 5866486

A Specter is Haunting Texas is a science fiction novel by American writer Fritz Leiber, first published as a novel in 1969. It was originally published as a three-part serial in the magazine Galaxy Science Fiction in 1968. The title appears to be based on a Karl Marx quote from The Communist Manifesto: "A spectre is haunting Europe...the spectre of communism."

== Plot summary ==
Scully Christopher Crockett La Cruz is an actor, fortune seeker and adventurer from the long isolated orbital technocratic democracies of Circumluna and the Bubbles Congeries. He lands in what he believes to be Canada to reclaim family mining interests only to discover that Canada is now North Texas and what is left of civilization in North America is ruled by primitive, backslapping, bigger than life anti-intellectual "good ole boys" convinced of their own moral superiority.

In the tortured version of history known to the giant hormone-boosted Anglo-Saxon inhabitants who rule a diminutive Mexican underclass, the original Texas, or Texas, had actually secretly ruled the pre-nuclear war United States since 1845.

Texas escaped the nuclear destruction of the rest of the United States because of the foresight of Lyndon the First. An enormous bunker then known as the Houston Carlsbad Caverns-Denver-Kansas City-Little Rock Pentagram and now referred to simply as the Texas Bunker had saved the heartland during a war that destroyed both American coasts, Europe, Russia, China, and Africa. Texas then conquered the rest of the continent, although Hawaii and Cuba remain stubbornly "unconquered".

== Reception ==
Alexei Panshin described Specter as "an intermittently satirical melodrama about revolution," saying "Its greatest strength, in fact, is in conceits and occasional lines. And two-thirds of the way through it falls apart, its satire forgotten in favor of the melodramatic requirement of movement at any cost." Ron Goulart called the novel "a big, funny and angry book. . . . a fine non-stop picaresque about a future United States that's turned into Texas and about race, love, violence, God, death, Shakespeare, and most anything else you can name."

== Release details ==
- Fritz Leiber. 1968, 1969, 1971. A Specter is Haunting Texas. Galaxy Science Fiction, Walker, Bantam.
