= Heroes and Horrors =

1978 collection of fantasy and horror short stories by Fritz Leiber

- Dust cover art from first edition
- Author: Fritz Leiber
- Cover artist: Tim Kirk
- Language: English
- Genre: Fantasy
- Publisher: Whispers Press
- Publication date: 1978
- Publication place: United States
- Media type: Print (hardcover)
- Pages: 237
- ISBN: 0-918372-03-8

Heroes and Horrors is a collection of fantasy and horror short stories by American writer Fritz Leiber, edited by Stuart David Schiff and illustrated by Tim Kirk. It was first published in hardcover in December 1978 by Whispers Press, and in paperback in August 1980 by Pocket Books. The paperback edition omits the illustrations.

The book collects nine short stories and novelettes by the author, together with an introduction by Stuart David Schiff and an essay by John Jakes. The first two stories (the second original to the collection) showcase Leiber's Sword and Sorcery heroes Fafhrd and the Gray Mouser. The other pieces originally were published in the magazines The Dragon Magazine for December 1977 and Fantastic Stories of Imagination for February 1962 and October 1964, the collection The Second Book of Fritz Leiber (1975), the magazines Fantastic for February 1969 and Worlds of If for August 1974, and the anthologies The Disciples of Cthulhu (1976) and Superhorror (1976).

== Contents ==
- "Preface" (Stuart David Schiff)
- "Fritz Leiber: An Appreciation" (John Jakes)
- "Sea Magic" (1977)
- "The Mer She" (1978)
- "A Bit of the Dark World" (1962)
- "Belsen Express" (1975)
- "Midnight in the Mirror World" (1964)
- "Richmond, Late September, 1849" (1969)
- "Midnight by the Morphy Watch" (1974)
- "The Terror from the Depths" (1976)
- "Dark Wings" (1976)

== Reception ==
Richard A. Lupoff described Heroes and Horrors as "a lovingly crafted production [including] a wealth of fantasy and horror material ranging from the modern, gritty, psychological variety . . . to the all-out Lovecraftian slithering-monstrosity variety."

== Awards ==
Heroes and Horrors was nominated for the 1979 World Fantasy Award for Best Anthology/Collection. The story "Midnight by the Morphy Watch" was nominated for the 1975 Hugo Award for Best Novelette.
