= Catch That Zeppelin! =

1975 short story by Fritz Leiber

"Catch That Zeppelin!" is a 1975 alternate history short story by American writer Fritz Leiber. It was first published in The Magazine of Fantasy and Science Fiction.

== Synopsis ==
When Fritz Leiber sees a Zeppelin moored at the Empire State Building one afternoon in 1973, he realizes that he has shifted into another timeline — one where a more decisive defeat of Germany at the end of the First World War led to greater international prosperity and a deeper, more acceptable peace, with the result that America was willing to sell Germany helium for use in airships, thereby preventing the Hindenburg disaster. Also, the year has changed from 1973 to 1937, and Leiber has become a patriotic-but-peaceful German airship engineer named Adolf Hitler.

== Reception ==
"Catch That Zeppelin!" won the 1975 Nebula Award for Best Short Story and the 1976 Hugo Award for Best Short Story.

John Clute considered it a "moving" story, "in which autobiography and fantasy meet with a strange, serene gaiety", while Fantasy Magazine called it "clever"; SF Signal, however, criticized it as "not all it could be", and "essentially plotless".
