= Fritz Leiber's Lankhmar: The New Adventures of Fafhrd and Gray Mouser =

Dungeons & Dragons accessory

- Genre: Role-playing games
- Publisher: TSR
- Publication date: 1996
- Media type: Boxed set

Fritz Leiber's Lankhmar: The New Adventures of Fafhrd and Gray Mouser is an accessory for the 2nd edition of the Advanced Dungeons & Dragons fantasy role-playing game, published in 1996.

== Contents ==
Fritz Leiber's Lankhmar: The New Adventures of Fafhrd and Gray Mouser is a supplement for playing in Lankhmar, using a simplified version of 2nd edition Advanced Dungeons & Dragons rules, including some starting adventures.

== Publication history ==
Fritz Leiber's Lankhmar: The New Adventures of Fafhrd and Gray Mouser was published by TSR, Inc. in 1996.

== Reception ==
Trenton Webb reviewed Fritz Leiber's Lankhmar: The New Adventures of Fafhrd and Gray Mouser for Arcane magazine, rating it a 7 out of 10 overall. He comments on the setting: "The intoxicating mix of big names and big city makes this an ideal starting point for new gamers. The heroes are solid role models for players to follow, while this archetypal fantasy city is easy for novices to picture mentally. Add to this a set of 'simplified' AD&D rules, a starter adventure and a wodge of background information on fantasy's greatest (if most error-prone) double-act, and you've got what could be a perfect set of 'trainer wheels' for any wannabe adventurers out there." He added: "Lankhmar is designed to introduce players to the joys of roleplaying. It aims to strip away the more involved rules to leave a leaner, faster and more approachable game that can be played by pretty much anybody. Indeed, the box proudly boasts that all you need to play are pencils, paper and a standard set of AD&D dice. This is factually true, if a little optimistic - there's a huge amount of reading to do before any dice will be rolled." Webb continued: "What will drag both referees and players through their respective tomes is the freewheeling, 'devil may care' spirit of adventure that underpins the whole Fafhrd and Mouser myth. These boys are thieves, cuckolds and suckers who spend as much time leaping from bedroom windows as they do righting wrongs or fighting horrific beasts. It is this instinctive sense of action that these abridged rules try hard to foster with the introduction of Luck dice and petitioning DMs to be just a little less lethal." He continued: "The action is compressed by this large but comprehensible city. Lankhmar is the kind of town you expect to find in fantasy, packed with cults, guilds, markets and honest-to-goodness intrigue. Most importantly, the names are pronounceable and the district system logical, which enables players to gain a geographical grasp of the world they now have the opportunity to explore." Webb added: "And such orientation is vital if players of Fritz Leiber's Lankhmar are to have fun because, while simplified, the rules will still be far more complex than any conventional game they'll have played before. The balance that has been struck between ease of play and enjoyable complexity almost works, but the monumental AD&D rules system does not reduce easily. So, Lankhmar is still packed with proficiencies and modifiers, which means that many players will spend far more time scouring their character sheets than the streets of the city." He continued: "The above-mentioned problems are compounded by the necessary brevity of the rulebooks and player guides. These have to be brisk, but this often leaves complicated concepts only functionally explained. Which is fine if you get the point first time round, but if you don't then there's precious little support material available and few examples to help you get to grips with how it all works." Webb concluded his review by saying: "As a result Lankhmar will prove frustrating for game groups composed solely of beginners. However, it will be perfect for any AD&D players who fancy cutting their teeth as a DM, or for experienced DMs who want to initiate a new circle of friends to roleplay. In these cases their familiarity would definitely be enough to carry the party through the inevitably testing start-up and into some seriously rollicking, relaxed and relatively rule-free adventures."

In a review of Fritz Leiber's Lankhmar: The New Adventures of Fafhrd and Gray Mouser for Pyramid #22 (November/December 1996), the reviewer felt that while previous attempts to bring Nehwon into typical AD&D campaigns did not match up well, this "changed with the new boxed set, which has taken the best of the old material and rethought several key areas to produce an outstanding product".

== Reviews ==
- Casus Belli #98
