= Night's Black Agents =

1947 collection of short stories by Fritz Leiber

- Dust Jacket Illustration by Ronald Clyne for Night's Black Agents by Fritz Leiber
- Author: Fritz Leiber
- Cover artist: Ronald Clyne
- Language: English
- Genre: Fantasy, horror
- Publisher: Arkham House
- Publication date: 1947
- Publication place: United States
- Media type: Print (hardback)
- Pages: x, 237

Night's Black Agents is a collection of fantasy and horror short stories by American writer Fritz Leiber. It was released in 1947 and was the author's first book. The book's title is taken from Macbeth, Act III, scene ii. It was published by Arkham House in an edition of 3,084 copies.

Most of the stories originally appeared in the magazines Unknown and Weird Tales. Three were first published in this book. The last two stories showcase Leiber's Sword and Sorcery heroes Fafhrd and the Gray Mouser.

Later editions added additional material under the same title. The Berkley (1978) reprint adds two stories "The Girl with the Hungry Eyes" and "A Bit of the Dark World". The definitive version is the Gregg Press (1980) hardcover which adds a Foreword by Richard Gid Powers to the complete contents of the Berkley edition and is thus an expansion of the original Arkham House edition.

== Contents ==
Night's Black Agents contains the following tales:

- "Foreword"
- "Smoke Ghost"
- "The Automatic Pistol"
- "The Inheritance / The Phantom Slayer"
- "The Hill and the Hole"
- "The Dreams of Albert Moreland"
- "The Hound / Diary in the Snow"
- "The Man Who Never Grew Young"
- "The Sunken Land"
- "Adept's Gambit"

== Sources ==
- Jaffery, Sheldon (1989). The Arkham House Companion. Mercer Island, WA: Starmont House, Inc. pp. 27–28. ISBN 1-55742-005-X.
- Chalker, Jack L.; Mark Owings (1998). The Science-Fantasy Publishers: A Bibliographic History, 1923-1998. Westminster, MD and Baltimore: Mirage Press, Ltd. p. 31.
- Joshi, S.T. (1999). Sixty Years of Arkham House: A History and Bibliography. Sauk City, WI: Arkham House. p. 44. ISBN 0-87054-176-5.
- Nielsen, Leon (2004). Arkham House Books: A Collector's Guide. Jefferson, NC and London: McFarland & Company, Inc. p. 64. ISBN 0-7864-1785-4.
