= Bazaar of the Bizarre =

- Short story by Fritz Leiber
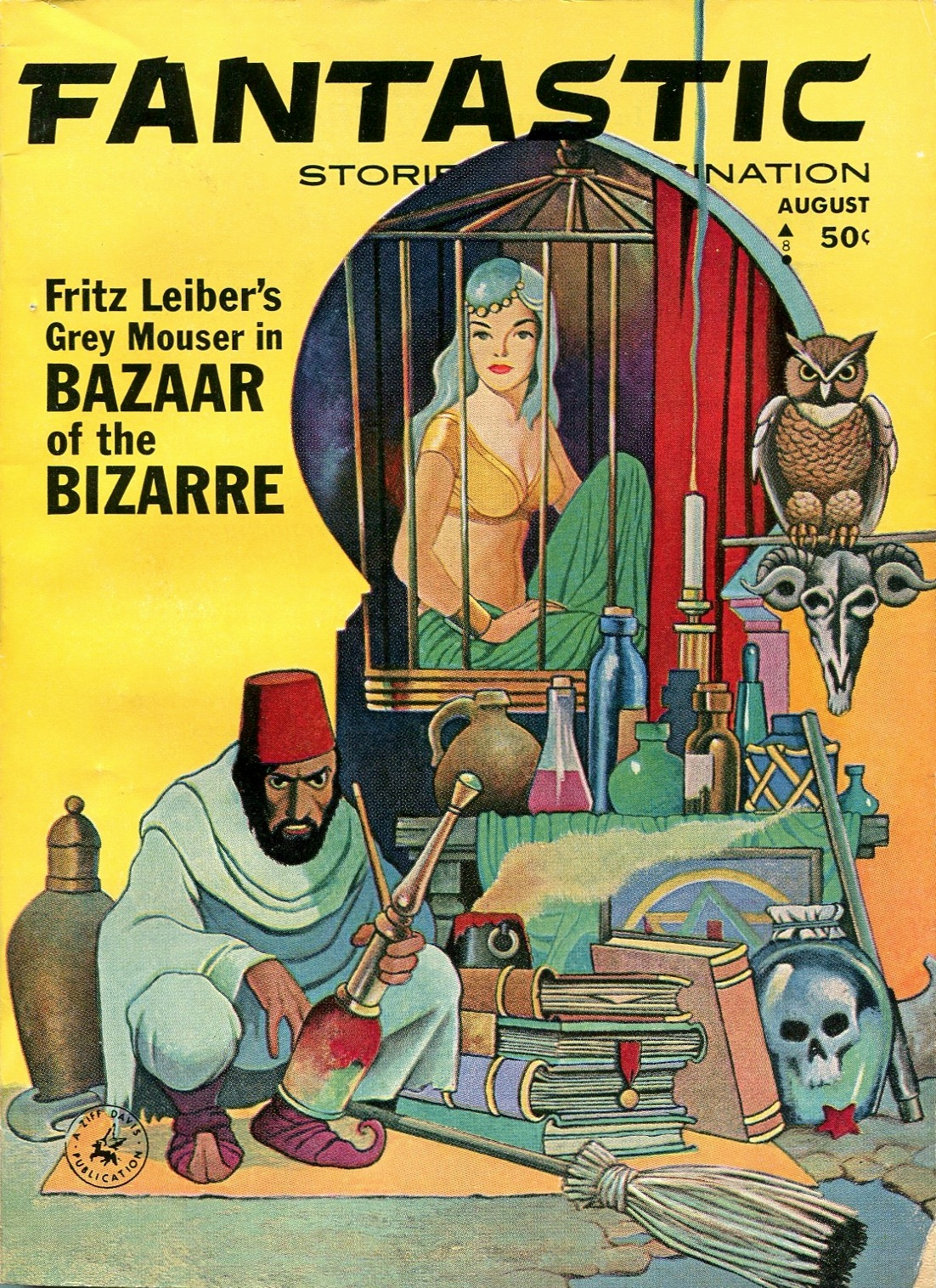
- "Bazaar of the Bizarre" was the cover story for the August 1963 issue of Fantastic
- Country: United States
- Language: English
- Genre: Fantasy

Publication
- Published in: Fantastic
- Publication date: August 1963
- Series: Fafhrd and the Gray Mouser

"Bazaar of the Bizarre" is a sword and sorcery novelette by American writer Fritz Leiber and part of the canon of stories chronicling Fafhrd and the Gray Mouser.

First published in 1963 in Fantastic, it has been reprinted several times, including as a standalone edition. It also appears in the anthology The Spell of Seven, edited by L. Sprague de Camp.

== Plot ==
One night in Lankhmar, the wizards Ningauble of the Seven Eyes and Sheelba of the Eyeless Face join forces and summon Fafhrd and the Gray Mouser to carry out a mission. They are required to enter the Plaza of Dark Delights and obliterate an illegal bazaar established there by the Devourers, alien merchants who magically mesmerize customers into buying high priced merchandise which is actually worthless junk. However, Mouser arrives before him and is enticed into the bazaar. Fafhrd, aided only by the Blindfold of True Seeing and Cloak of Invisibility, given to him by the wizards, must perform the mission alone.

This he does, battling not only an entranced Mouser, but reanimated skeletons and living statues as well, against which his weapons are all but useless. He manages to escape and rescue Mouser, who is still mesmerized into believing that the junk he sees is actually valuable, including books of ancient spells.
