= Lean Times in Lankhmar =

1996 novel by Fritz Leiber

Lean Times in Lankhmar is a collection of stories by Fritz Leiber published by White Wolf in 1996.

== Plot summary ==
Lean Times in Lankhmar is the second volume of Fafhrd and the Gray Mouser stories that White Wolf published.

== Reception ==
Jonathan Palmer reviewed Lean Times in Lankhmar for Arcane magazine, rating it an 8 out of 10 overall. Palmer comments that "These stories have been very influential on late 20th century fantasy writing and the development of roleplaying. It is what happens in the land of Newhon (and places beyond) that makes fantasy fun, and makes people think that fantasy gaming might be fun, too."

== Reviews ==
- Review by uncredited (1999) in Vector 208
