= Gregg Press =

Defunct American small press/imprint

- Status: Defunct
- Founded: 1963
- Founder: Charles Gregg
- Successor: G. K. Hall & Co.
- Country of origin: United States
- Headquarters location: Upper Saddle River, New Jersey
- Publication types: Books

Gregg Press was founded about 1965 by Charles Gregg in Upper Saddle River, New Jersey to distribute in the United States the antiquarian reprints published in the UK by Gregg Press International.

Gregg decided he wanted to publish scholarly reprints of his own and initially focused on reprinting classics of American literature in runs of 250 to 500 copies for the US academic library market. His first program, Americans in Fiction, included 70 out-of-copyright titles selected by Duke University literature professor Clarence Gohdes. The series was sold as a set, but individual titles could be purchased separately. Another early series was :"The American Humorists", reprinting at least 3 titles, including "The Rise and Fall of the Mustache, and other Hawk-Eyetems" (1969) by Robert Burdette.

Charles Gregg sold Gregg Press to ITT Corp. in 1972, and the operation was moved to Boston, becoming a division of ITT's library reference publishing company, G. K. Hall & Co. James F. Koehlinger, General Manager of Gregg, moved to Boston with the company to oversee its transition for a year. Thomas T. Beeler was hired as editor of Gregg Press in Boston in June 1972. Beeler developed a Library Reference reprint series for Gregg and oversaw the publication of the already-contracted American Revolutionary Series.

== Science fiction ==
Promotional poster by Jim McDermott.

After Koehlinger left, Beeler developed an idea for a science fiction series with a long-time friend and fellow English department graduate student at Columbia, David G. Hartwell. The idea for the series was to produce permanent hardcover editions of the classics of science fiction, including works still in copyright. Each book in the series offered a facsimile of the first edition of the work with a new introduction written by a contemporary science fiction author. Beeler handled contracts, design and production, while Hartwell made the selections and secured authors for the introductions, some of which were ultimately written by Hartwell himself.

Ultimately 252 titles appeared in the Gregg Press Science Fiction Series between 1974 and 1985. All titles were printed on acid-free paper, sewn and bound in library-grade cloth bindings stamped with a color panel and gold lettering. There were no book jackets, giving the series a permanent library look. Most print runs were under 500 copies. A few titles, most notably Robert A. Heinlein's Destination: Moon, were reprinted, but no one title ever sold more than 1,250 copies.

In addition to the classic titles Hartwell and Beeler also produced sets of titles in series with jackets. These included the Witch World novels of Andre Norton and the Fafhrd and the Gray Mouser collection of Fritz Leiber.

Authors were usually represented in series with introductions by authorities in the field such as Thomas M. Disch, Lou Stathis and Paul Williams. Many of the Gregg editions were bibliographically important as the first hardback editions of many books, including several by Leiber and Philip K. Dick.

Dust jacket artists included Wayne Barlowe and Vincent Di Fate. Some books featured frontispiece illustrations by Hannah Shapiro. Promotional art for Gregg Press was by Jim McDermott.

== Other lines ==
Gregg produced a mystery reprint series edited by Otto Penzler, a children's series edited by Betsy Groban and a few groups of popular and bestselling novels that had originally been published only as mass market paperbacks, including Silhouette Romances. The aim of these series was to establish a market for Gregg Books at higher print runs among public libraries.

These secondary series met with limited success, and by the mid-1980s Gregg was no longer publishing. In March, 1985, when ITT sold G. K. Hall & Co. to Macmillan Publishing in New York, Gregg was no longer active. G. K. Hall is now an imprint of Thomson Gale.
