= Lankhmar =

Fictional city created Fritz Leiber

- 'Fafhrd and the Gray Mouser' location
- Created by: Fritz Leiber
- Genre: Fantasy, sword and sorcery

In-universe information
- Other name: Lankhmar
- Type: Monarchy
- Locations: Lankhmar (capital)
- Language(s): Lankhmarese

Lankhmar is a fictional city in the Fafhrd and the Gray Mouser stories by Fritz Leiber. It is situated on the world of Nehwon, just west of the Great Salt Marsh and east of the River Hlal, and serves as the home of Leiber's two antiheroes.

== Description ==
Lankhmar is richly described as a populous and labyrinthine city rife with corruption, "the City of the Black Toga." It is decadent or squalid in roughly equal parts and said to be so shrouded by smog that the stars are rarely sighted (the city's alternate name is "the City of Sevenscore Thousand Smokes"). Located next to the Inner Sea, Lankhmar is visited by ships from across Nehwon and is the starting point for Fafhrd and the Mouser's many sea voyages.

The city is ostensibly ruled by an overlord and his nobility. The Thieves' Guild is influential, too, and controls Lankhmar's abundant criminal element, with the notable exceptions of Fafhrd and the Gray Mouser.

Streets in Lankhmar are often evocatively named (the Thieves' Guild is located on Cheap Street near Death's Alley and Murder Alley). Commonly referenced locations are the Silver Eel Tavern, behind which is Bone Alley, and the Golden Lamprey Inn. The main meeting place is the Plaza of Dark Delights, which is the setting for the story "The Bazaar of the Bizarre". The religious center of Lankhmar is the Street of the Gods (the Gods in Lankhmar), along which numerous (and often bizarre) cults seek to arrange themselves in order of popularity. The true gods of Lankhmar, however, are feared rather than worshipped. These "Black Bones" (mummified ancestors of the Lankhmarese) occasionally leave their temple and battle threats to the city—or threats to their own position as the preeminent religion within Lankhmar.

Beneath Lankhmar is an underground city inhabited by sentient rats. At one point, the Mouser, magically reduced in size, infiltrates this hidden world.

Leiber's Lankhmar bears considerable similarity to 16th Century Seville as depicted in Miguel de Cervantes' classical picaresque tale "Rinconete y Cortadillo": a bustling, cosmopolitan maritime city, into whose port galleons sail laden with gold from which only a few benefit, with a thoroughly corrupt civil government and a powerful and well-organized Thieves' Guild—all seen through the eyes of two young adventurers who formed a partnership to guard each other's back in this dangerous milieu. However, Cervantes' protagonists, less daring than Leiber's, do not confront the Thieves' Guild but instead enter its ranks.

In its earliest incarnations, Lankhmar was sometimes called "Lankmar" or "Lahkmar". The change in the final published spelling may have been due to Leiber misreading some of the early maps created by Harry Fischer and his wife Martha.

== In games ==
=== Board games ===
In 1937, Leiber and his college friend Harry Fischer created a wargame set within the world of Nehwon, which Fischer had helped to create. This game initially used the "Lahkmar" spelling, and was played on a large (five by two and a half feet) three-dimensional board. Later, they created a board game called Lankhmar which was released by TSR in 1976.

=== Role-playing games ===
==== Advanced Dungeons and Dragons ====
Leiber licensed the Fafhrd and Grey Mouser stories to TSR, Inc. for use in the role playing game Advanced Dungeons & Dragons, which provided comfortable income in his final years.

The first edition AD&D game book Deities & Demigods (1980, renamed Legends & Lore in 1985) and the second edition AD&D book Legends & Lore both include a section on the Nehwon mythos, and stats out several characters from the books as well as gods and monsters.

Lankhmar – City of Adventure (1985) was a supplement produced by TSR for their Advanced Dungeons & Dragons (AD&D) role-playing game containing maps, descriptions of the city areas, game statistics for various prominent characters from the stories, and ideas for adventures in and around the city. It was updated in 1993 under the same name for use with 2nd edition AD&D. Several modules and accessories were produced for use with City of Adventure.

The New Adventures of Fafhrd and Gray Mouser (1996) was a boxed set that replaced Lankhmar, City of Adventure and could be used as an AD&D supplement or a standalone RPG with simplified AD&D rules.

For many years, the role-playing magazine Dragon ran a column introducing magical treasures, under the name "Bazaar of the Bizarre", in honour of the magical emporium in Lankhmar (and Leiber's story of the same name). When the column's name was changed, there was sufficient outcry from readers for the name to be reinstated.

==== Other games ====
In 2006, Mongoose Publishing began publishing a number of Lankhmar-themed roleplaying books based on its revival of the RuneQuest roleplaying game system, starting with Lankhmar (ISBN 978-1-905471-69-0) and Lankhmar: Nehwon (ISBN 978-1-905471-99-7).

In 2015, Pinnacle Entertainment Group released Lankhmar: City of Thieves along with a collection of supplements and accessories including a player's guide, maps, adventures, character archetypes, and a gamemaster's screen.

Goodman Games released its DCC Lankhmar boxed set in 2019 as a supplement to the Dungeon Crawl Classics roleplaying game. This set introduces modifications of the base DCC rules for a style of play more consistent with Leiber's writing, as well a city guide, and an introductory adventure.

== Influence ==
The fictional city of Ankh-Morpork from Terry Pratchett's Discworld draws influence from Lankhmar, among several other real and fictitious cities. Two key characters in Pratchett's first Discworld novel, The Colour of Magic, are Bravd and the Weasel, a reference to Fafhrd and the Gray Mouser, and the name Ankh-Morpork is itself a partial anagram of Lankhmar.
