= Fritz Leiber =

American fantasy, horror, and SF writer (1910–1992)

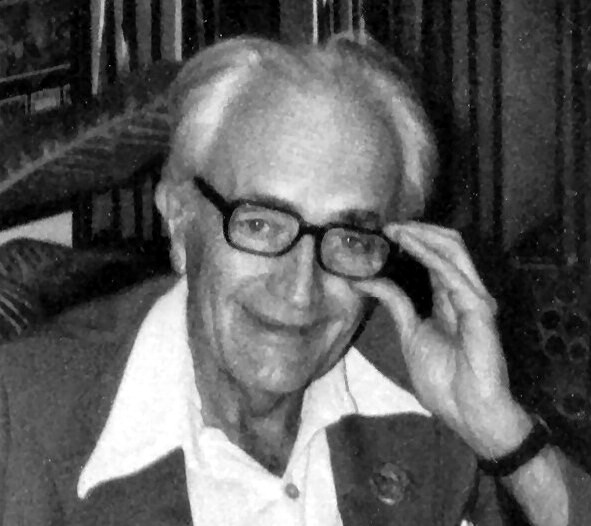
- Leiber in 1977
- Born: Fritz Reuter Leiber Jr. December 24, 1910; Chicago, Illinois, U.S.
- Died: September 5, 1992 (aged 81); San Francisco, California, U.S.
- Occupation: Writer
- Spouses: Jonquil Stephens (m. 1936; died 1969) Margo Skinner (m. 1992)
- Children: Justin Leiber
- Parent: Fritz Leiber (father)
- Writing career
- Period: 1934–1992 (Note: Strange Wonders, pp. 173–99. ISFDB which reports that "Riches and Power" appeared in "The Churchman", December 1, 1934, and provides no such data for five with 1935 dates.)
- Genres: Fantasy, horror, science fiction
- Notable works: Fafhrd and the Gray Mouser series, The Big Time

Fritz Reuter Leiber Jr. (/ˈlaɪbər/ LY-bər; December 24, 1910 – September 5, 1992) was an American writer of fantasy, horror, and science fiction.

His prominent works include the sword and sorcery characters Fafhrd and the Gray Mouser featured in 36 stories and one novel, and the award-winning novels The Big Time (1958) and Our Lady of Darkness (1979). Leiber was a friend of H. P. Lovecraft, and wrote several stories in the Cthulhu Mythos.

== Life ==
Fritz Leiber was born December 24, 1910, in Chicago, Illinois, to the actors Fritz Leiber and Virginia Bronson Leiber. For a time, he seemed inclined to follow in his parents' footsteps; the theater and actors feature in his fiction. He spent 1928 touring with his parents' Shakespeare company (Fritz Leiber & Co.) before entering the University of Chicago, where he was elected to Phi Beta Kappa and received an undergraduate Ph.B. degree in psychology and physiology or biology with honors in 1932. From 1932 to 1933, he worked as a lay reader and studied as a candidate for the ministry, without taking a degree, at the General Theological Seminary in Chelsea, Manhattan, an affiliate of the Episcopal Church.

After pursuing graduate studies in philosophy at the University of Chicago from 1933 to 1934 and again not taking a degree, he remained in Chicago while touring under the stage name of "Francis Lathrop" intermittently with his parents' company and pursuing a literary career. Six short stories later included in the 2010 collection Strange Wonders: A Collection of Rare Fritz Leiber Works carry 1934 and 1935 dates. He also appeared alongside his father in uncredited parts in George Cukor's Camille (1936), James Whale's The Great Garrick (1937), and William Dieterle's The Hunchback of Notre Dame (1939).

In 1936, he initiated a brief, intense correspondence with H. P. Lovecraft, who "encouraged and influenced [Leiber's] literary development" before Lovecraft died in March 1937. Leiber introduced Fafhrd and the Gray Mouser in "Two Sought Adventure", his first professionally published short story in the August 1939 edition of Unknown, edited by John W. Campbell.

Leiber married Jonquil Stephens on January 16, 1936. Their only child, philosopher and science fiction writer Justin Leiber, was born in 1938. From 1937 to 1941, Fritz Leiber was employed by Consolidated Book Publishing as a staff writer for the Standard American Encyclopedia. In 1941, the family moved to California, where Leiber served as a speech and drama instructor at Occidental College during the 1941–1942 academic year.

Unable to conceal his disdain for academic politics as the United States entered World War II, he decided that the struggle against fascism mattered more than his long-held pacifist convictions. He accepted a position with Douglas Aircraft in quality inspection, primarily working on the C-47 Skytrain. Throughout the war, he continued to regularly publish fiction.

Thereafter, the family returned to Chicago, where Leiber served as associate editor of Science Digest from 1945 to 1956. During this decade (forestalled by a fallow interregnum from 1954 to 1956), his output (including the 1947 Arkham House anthology Night's Black Agents) was characterized by Poul Anderson as "a lot of the best science fiction and fantasy in the business". In 1958, the Leibers returned to Los Angeles. By then, he could afford to relinquish his journalistic career and support his family as a full-time fiction writer.

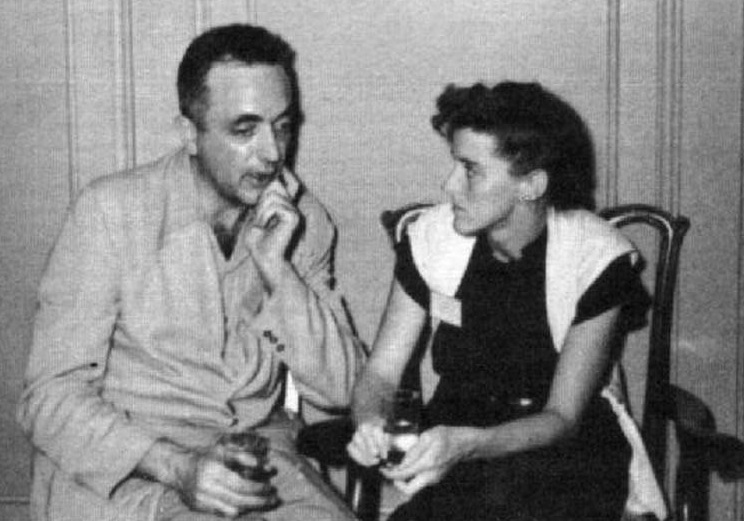
Leiber and Katherine MacLean at the 1952 World Science Fiction Convention

Jonquil's death in 1969 precipitated Leiber's permanent relocation to San Francisco and exacerbated his longstanding alcoholism after twelve years of fellowship in Alcoholics Anonymous. He gradually regained sobriety, an effort impeded by comorbid barbiturate abuse, over the next two decades. Perhaps as a result of his substance abuse, Leiber seems to have suffered periods of penury in the 1970s; Harlan Ellison wrote of his anger at finding that the much-awarded Leiber had to write his novels on a manual typewriter propped up over the sink in his apartment. Visiting Leiber as a fan in 1976, Marc Laidlaw wrote that he "was shocked to find him occupying one small room of a seedy San Francisco residence hotel, its squalor relieved mainly by walls of books". Other reports suggest that Leiber preferred to live simply in the city, spending his money on dining, movies, and travel. In the last years of his life, royalty checks from TSR, Inc. (the makers of Dungeons & Dragons, who had licensed the mythos of the Fafhrd and Gray Mouser series) were enough in themselves to ensure that he lived comfortably. In 1977, he returned to his original form with a fantasy novel set in modern-day San Francisco, Our Lady of Darkness, which is about a writer of weird tales who must deal with the death of his wife and his recovery from alcoholism.

In 1992, the last year of his life, Leiber married his second wife, Margo Skinner, a journalist and poet with whom he had been friends for years. Leiber died a few weeks after a physical collapse while traveling from a science fiction convention in London, Ontario, with Skinner. The cause of death was a stroke.

He wrote a 100-page-plus memoir, Not Much Disorder and Not So Early Sex, which can be found in The Ghost Light (1984).

Leiber's own literary criticism, including several essays on Lovecraft, was collected in the volume Fafhrd and Me (1990).

== Theater ==
As the child of two Shakespearean actors, Leiber was fascinated with the stage, describing itinerant Shakespearean companies in stories like "No Great Magic" and "Four Ghosts in Hamlet", and creating an actor/producer protagonist for his novel A Specter is Haunting Texas.

Although his Change War novel, The Big Time, is about a war between two factions, the "Snakes" and the "Spiders", changing and rechanging history throughout the universe, all the action takes place in a small bubble of isolated space-time the size of a theatrical stage, and with only a handful of characters. Judith Merril (in the July 1969 issue of The Magazine of Fantasy & Science Fiction) remarks on Leiber's acting skills when the writer won a science fiction convention costume ball. Leiber's costume consisted of a cardboard military collar over turned-up jacket lapels, cardboard insignia, an armband, and a spider pencilled large in black on his forehead, thus turning him into an officer of the Spiders, one of the combatants in his Change War stories. "The only other component," Merril writes, "was the Leiber instinct for theatre."

== Films ==
Due to having the same name as his father, Leiber Jr. was incorrectly attributed to some roles which were in fact played by his father. Fritz Leiber Sr. was the evil Inquisitor in the Errol Flynn adventure film The Sea Hawk (1940) and many other movies from 1917 to the late 1950s. It is the elder Leiber, not the younger, who appears in Charlie Chaplin's Monsieur Verdoux (1947) and the Vincent Price vehicle The Web (1947).

The younger Leiber can be seen briefly as Valentin in the 1936 film version of Camille starring Greta Garbo. In the cult horror film Equinox (1970) directed by Dennis Muren and Jack Woods, Leiber has a cameo appearance as a geologist, Dr. Watermann. In the edited second version of the movie, Leiber has no spoken dialogue but appears in a few scenes. The original version of the movie has a longer appearance by Leiber recounting the ancient book and a brief speaking role; all were cut from the re-release.

He also appears as Chavez in the 1979 Schick Sunn Classics documentary The Bermuda Triangle, based on the book by Charles Berlitz.

== Writing career ==
Leiber was heavily influenced by H. P. Lovecraft, Robert Graves, John Webster, and Shakespeare in the first two decades of his career. Beginning in the late 1950s, he was increasingly influenced by the works of Carl Jung, particularly by the concepts of the anima and the shadow. In the mid-1960s, he began incorporating elements of Joseph Campbell's The Hero with a Thousand Faces. These concepts are often mentioned in his stories, especially the anima, which becomes a method of exploring his fascination with, but estrangement from, the female.

Leiber liked cats, which are featured in many of his stories. Tigerishka, for example, is a cat-like alien who is sexually attractive to the human protagonist yet repelled by human customs in the novel The Wanderer. Leiber's "Gummitch" stories feature a kitten with an I.Q. of 160, just waiting for his ritual cup of coffee so that he can become human, too.

His first stories in the 1930s and 40s were inspired by Lovecraft's Cthulhu Mythos. A notable critic and historian of the wider Mythos, S. T. Joshi, has singled out Leiber's "The Sunken Land" (Unknown Worlds, February 1942) as the most accomplished of the early stories based on Lovecraft's Mythos. Leiber also later wrote several essays on Lovecraft the man, such as "A Literary Copernicus" (1949), the publication of which formed a key moment in the emergence of a serious critical appreciation of Lovecraft's life and work.

Leiber's first professional sale was "Two Sought Adventure" (Unknown, August 1939), which introduced his most famous characters, Fafhrd and the Gray Mouser. In 1943, his first two novels were serialized in Unknown (the supernatural horror-oriented Conjure Wife, inspired by his experiences on the faculty of Occidental College) and Astounding Science Fiction (Gather, Darkness).

1947 marked the publication of his first book, Night's Black Agents, a short story collection containing seven stories grouped as 'Modern Horrors', one as a 'Transition', and two grouped as 'Ancient Adventures': "The Sunken Land" and "Adept's Gambit", which are both stories of Fafhrd and the Gray Mouser.

The science fiction novel Gather, Darkness followed in 1950. It deals with a futuristic world that follows the Second Atomic Age which is ruled by scientists, until in the throes of a new Dark Age, the witches revolt.

In 1951, Leiber was Guest of Honor at the World Science Fiction Convention in New Orleans. Further novels followed during the 1950s, and in 1958 The Big Time won the Hugo Award for Best Novel.

Leiber continued to publish in the 1960s. His novel The Wanderer (1964) also won the Hugo for Best Novel. In the novel, an artificial planet nicknamed the Wanderer materializes from hyperspace within earth's orbit. The Wanderer's gravitational field captures the moon and shatters it into something like one of Saturn's rings. On Earth, the Wanderer's gravity well triggers earthquakes, tsunamis, and tidal phenomena. The multi-threaded plot follows the exploits of an ensemble cast as they struggle to survive the global disaster.

In the same period, Leiber published "Black Gondolier", a short story in which a protagonist uncovers a cosmic conspiracy in which oil from ancient fossils preys upon human beings and human civilizations. Leiber received the Hugo Award for Best Novella in 1970 and 1971 for "Ship of Shadows" (1969) and "Ill Met in Lankhmar" (1970). "Gonna Roll the Bones" (1967), his contribution to Harlan Ellison's Dangerous Visions anthology, won the Hugo Award for Best Novelette and the Nebula Award for Best Novelette in 1968.

Our Lady of Darkness (1977), originally serialized in short form in The Magazine of Fantasy & Science Fiction under the title "The Pale Brown Thing" (1977), featured cities as the breeding grounds for new types of elementals called paramentals, summonable by the dark art of "megapolisomancy", which combines elements of magic, urban psychology, and mystical geometry tied to large modern cities and landmarks such as the Transamerica Pyramid. Its main characters include Franz Westen, Jaime Donaldus Byers, and the magician Thibault de Castries. Our Lady of Darkness won the World Fantasy Award—Novel.

Leiber, a lifelong devotee of Edgar Rice Burroughs, also wrote the 1966 novelization of the Clair Huffaker screenplay of Tarzan and the Valley of Gold.

Many of Leiber's most acclaimed works are short stories, especially in the horror genre, including "The Smoke Ghost", "The Girl With the Hungry Eyes", and "You're All Alone" (later expanded as The Sinful Ones). Leiber also challenged the conventions of science fiction through reflexive narratives such as "A Bad Day For Sales" (first published in Galaxy Science Fiction, July 1953), in which the protagonist, Robie, "America's only genuine mobile salesrobot", references the title character of Isaac Asimov's idealistic robot story, "Robbie". Questioning Isaac Asimov's Three Laws of Robotics, Leiber imagines the futility of automatons in a post-apocalyptic New York City. In his later years, Leiber returned to short story horror in such works as "Horrible Imaginings", "Black Has Its Charms" and the award-winning "The Button Moulder".

The short parallel worlds story "Catch That Zeppelin!" (1975) won the Hugo Award for Best Short Story and the Nebula Award for Best Short Story in 1976. It presents an alternate reality much better than our own, as opposed to the usual parallel universe story depicting a world worse than our own. "Belsen Express" (1975) won the World Fantasy Award—Short Fiction.

Leiber was named the second Gandalf Grand Master of Fantasy by participants in the 1975 World Science Fiction Convention (Worldcon), after the posthumous inaugural award to J. R. R. Tolkien. Next year he won the World Fantasy Award for Life Achievement. He was Guest of Honor at the 1979 Worldcon in Brighton, England (1979). The Science Fiction Writers of America made him its fifth SFWA Grand Master in 1981; the Horror Writers Association made him an inaugural winner of the Bram Stoker Award for Lifetime Achievement in 1988 (named in 1987); and the Science Fiction and Fantasy Hall of Fame inducted him in 2001, its sixth class of two deceased and two living writers.

Leiber was a founding member of the Swordsmen and Sorcerers' Guild of America (SAGA), a loose-knit group of Heroic fantasy authors founded in the 1960s and led by Lin Carter. Some works by SAGA members were published in Carter's Flashing Swords! anthologies. Leiber himself is credited with inventing the term sword and sorcery for the particular subgenre of epic fantasy exemplified by his Fafhrd and Grey Mouser stories.

In an appreciation in the July 1969 "Special Fritz Leiber Issue" of The Magazine of Fantasy & Science Fiction, Judith Merril writes of Leiber's connection with his readers: "That this kind of personal response...is shared by thousands of other readers, has been made clear on several occasions." The November 1959 issue of Fantastic, for instance: Leiber had just come out of one of his recurrent dry spells, and editor Cele Lalli bought up all his new material until there was enough [five stories] to fill an issue; the magazine came out with a big black headline across its cover — Leiber Is Back!

== Fafhrd and the Gray Mouser ==
His legacy has been consolidated by his most famous creations, the Fafhrd and the Gray Mouser stories, written over a span of 50 years. The first, "Two Sought Adventure", appeared in Unknown, August 1939. The stories are about an unlikely pair of heroes found in and around the city of Lankhmar. Fafhrd was based on Leiber himself and the Mouser on his friend Harry Otto Fischer, and the two characters were created in a series of letters exchanged by the two in the mid-1930s. These stories were among the progenitors of many of the tropes of sword and sorcery.

Some Fafhrd and Mouser stories were recognized by annual genre awards: "Scylla's Daughter" (1961) was "Short Story" Hugo finalist, and "Ill Met in Lankhmar" (1970) won the "Best Novella" Hugo and Nebula Awards. Leiber's last major work, The Knight and Knave of Swords (1991), closed out the series while leaving room for possible sequels. In his last year, Leiber considered allowing other writers to continue the series, but his sudden death made this more difficult. One new Fafhrd and the Mouser novel, Swords Against the Shadowland, by Robin Wayne Bailey, appeared in 1998.

The stories influenced the shaping of sword and sorcery and other works. Joanna Russ' stories about thief-assassin Alyx (collected in 1976 in The Adventures of Alyx) were in part inspired by Fafhrd and the Gray Mouser, and Alyx made guest appearances in two of Leiber's stories. More recently, playing off the visit of Fafhrd and the Grey Mouser to our world in Adept's Gambit (set in second century B.C. Tyre), Steven Saylor's short story "Ill Seen in Tyre" takes his Roma Sub Rosa series hero Gordianus to the city of Tyre a hundred years later, where the two visitors from Nehwon are remembered as local legends.

Fischer and Leiber contributed to the original design of the 1976 wargame Lankhmar from TSR.

== Selected works ==
=== Fafhrd and the Gray Mouser series ===
1. Two Sought Adventure (1958). Collection of six short stories. Later expanded and retitled as Swords Against Death.
2. Swords and Deviltry (1970). Collection of 3 short stories.
3. Swords Against Death (1970). Collection of 10 short stories; an expanded edition of Two Sought Adventure
4. Swords in the Mist (1968). Collection of 6 short stories.
5. Swords Against Wizardry (1968). Collection of 4 short stories.
6. The Swords of Lankhmar (1968). Expanded from "Scylla's Daughter" in Fantastic, 1963.
7. Swords and Ice Magic (1977). Collection of 8 short stories. (Though see Rime Isle below.)
8. The Knight and Knave of Swords (1988). Collection of 4 short stories. Retitled Farewell to Lankhmar (2000, UK).
9. Ill Met In Lankhmar (Copyright 1970, published in book format 1996, The Science Fiction Collection Book Club.)

=== Novels and novellas ===
- Conjure Wife (originally appeared in Unknown Worlds, April 1943) — This novel relates a college professor's discovery that his wife (and many other women) are regularly using magic against and for one another and their husbands.
- Gather, Darkness! (serialized in Astounding, May, June, and July 1943) and later published as a book – a dystopian, satirical depiction of a future theocracy and the revolution that brings it down.
- Destiny Times Three (1945, first in Astounding) (reprinted 1957 as Galaxy Novel number 28)
- The Sinful Ones (1953), an adulterated version of You're All Alone (1950 Fantastic Adventures abridged); Leiber rewrote the inserted passages and saw published a revised edition in 1980.
- The Green Millennium (1953)
- The Night of the Long Knives (Amazing Science Fiction Stories, January 1960)
- The Big Time (expanded 1961 from a version serialized in Galaxy, March and April 1958, which won a Hugo) — Change War series. Also available in Ship of Shadows (1979) – see Collections below.
- The Silver Eggheads (1961; a shorter version was published in The Magazine of Fantasy & Science Fiction in 1959)
- The Wanderer (1964)
- Tarzan and the Valley of Gold (1966) (novelisation of a Clair Huffaker screenplay)
- A Specter Is Haunting Texas (1969)
- You're All Alone (1972) (the first book edition includes two shorter works as well, a revised version was issued as The Sinful Ones)
- Our Lady of Darkness (1977) This novel, the title of which is drawn from Thomas de Quincey's Suspiria de Profundis, was published the same year as the release of Dario Argento's Suspiria, which referenced the same idea in de Quincey. It also makes fictional reference to fellow novelists Jack London, Clark Ashton Smith and H. P. Lovecraft and others.
- Rime Isle (1977) (somewhere between a novella and a two-novelette collection, composed of "The Frost Monstreme" and "Rime Isle" offered as a unitary volume)
- Ervool (Cheap Street, 1980—limited ed of 200 numbered copies). A standalone edition of a short story originally published in the 1940s fanzine The Acolyte.
- The Dealings of Daniel Kesserich (1997) — H. P. Lovecraftian novella written in 1936 and lost for decades
- Dark Ladies (NY: Tor Books, 1999). Omnibus edition of Conjure Wife and Our Lady of Darkness

=== Collections ===
- Night's Black Agents (Arkham House, 1947). Reprinted by Berkley, 1978 with the addition of two stories – "The Girl With the Hungry Eyes" and "A Bit of the Dark World". The definitive hardcover edition is the Gregg Press (1980) edition, which adds a foreword by Richard Powers to the complete contents of the Berkley edition.
- The Mind Spider and Other Stories (1961). Collection of 6 short stories.
- Shadows With Eyes (1962). Collection of 6 short stories.
- A Pail of Air (1964). Collection of 11 short stories.
- Ships to the Stars (1964). Collection of 6 short stories.
- The Night of the Wolf (1966). Collection of 4 short stories.
- The Secret Songs (1968). Collection of 11 short stories.
- Night Monsters (1969). Collection of 4 short stories. UK (1974) edition drops 1 story and adds 4.
- The Best of Fritz Leiber (1974). Collection of 22 short stories. (Introduction by Poul Anderson, "The Wizard of Nehwon")
- The Book of Fritz Leiber (1974). Collection of 10 stories and 9 articles.
- The Second Book of Fritz Leiber (1975). Collection of 4 stories, 1 play, and 6 articles.
- The Worlds of Fritz Leiber (Ace Books, 1976). Collection of 22 short stories including "Catch That Zeppelin!".
- Bazaar of the Bizarre (1978)
- Heroes and Horrors (1978). Collection of 9 stories.
- Ship of Shadows (1979). Collection of 5 award-winning short stories [ 3 stories 2 novellas & 1 novelThe BigTime.]
- Changewar (1983). Collection of the Changewar short stories (7 stories).
- The Ghost Light (1984). Collection of 9 stories with illustrations and an autobiographic essay with photographs.
- The Leiber Chronicles (1990) Collection of 44 short stories.
- Gummitch and Friends (1992). Leiber's cat stories, the first five of which feature Gummitch.
- Ill Met in Lankhmar (White Wolf Publishing, 1995, ISBN 1-56504-926-8) combines Swords and Deviltry (1970) and Swords Against Death (1970).
- Lean Times in Lankhmar (White Wolf Publishing, 1996, ISBN 1-56504-927-6) combines Swords in the Mist (1970) and Swords Against Wizardry (1970)
- Return to Lankhmar (White Wolf Publishing, 1997, ISBN 1-56504-928-4) combines The Swords of Lankhmar (1968) and Swords and Ice Magic (1977)
- Farewell to Lankhmar (White Wolf Publishing, 1999, ISBN 1-56504-897-0)
- The Black Gondolier (2000) Collection of 18 short stories.
- Smoke Ghost and Other Apparitions (2002) Collection of 18 short stories.
- Day Dark, Night Bright (Collection of 20 short stories, 2002)
- Horrible Imaginings (2004) Collection of 15 short stories.
- Strange Wonders (Subterranean Press, 2010). Edited by Benjamin Szumskyj. Collection of 48 unpublished and uncollected works (drafts, fragments, poems, essays, and a play).
- Fritz Leiber: Selected Stories (Night Shade Books, 2010). Edited by Jonathan Strahan and Charles N. Brown. Collection of 17 stories, with an introduction by Neil Gaiman.

=== Plays ===
- Quicks Around the Zodiac: A Farce. (Newcastle, VA: Cheap Street, 1983). (Reprinted in Strange Wonders, 2010).

=== Essays ===
- The Mystery of the Japanese Clock. A standalone essay on the workings of a digital Japanese clock. Montgolfier Press, 1982, with Introduction by his son Justin Leiber. (Reprinted in Strange Wonders, 2010).

=== Poetry ===
- Demons of the Upper Air (Glendale, CA: Roy A. Squires, 1969).
- Sonnets to Jonquil and All (Glendale, CA: Roy A. Squires, 1978).

=== Screen adaptations ===
Conjure Wife has been made into feature films four times under other titles:

- Weird Woman (1944) starring Lon Chaney Jr. One of six Inner Sanctum mystery films made by Universal Studios based upon the old Inner Sanctum radio series.
- Conjure Wife was also adapted for the 1960 TV series Moment of Fear (episode title "The Accomplice")
- Night of the Eagle (also known as Burn, Witch, Burn!) (1962) (screenplay by Charles Beaumont, Richard Matheson and George Baxt, directed by Sidney Hayers, produced by Albert Fennell)
- Witches' Brew (also known as Which Witch is Which?) (1980) Directed by Richard Shore and starring Teri Garr and Richard Benjamin.

"The Girl with the Hungry Eyes" was filmed under that title by Kastenbaum Films in 1995. (This film is not to be confused with the 1967 William Rotsler film The Girl with the Hungry Eyes which is entirely unrelated to Leiber's story).

Two Leiber stories were filmed for TV for Rod Serling's Night Gallery. These were "The Girl with the Hungry Eyes" (1970) (adapted by Robert M. Young and directed by John Badham) and "The Dead Man" (adapted and directed by Douglas Heyes).

== See also ==
- International Fortean Organization
- Golden Age of Science Fiction
