= Grafton (publisher) =

Publisher

Grafton was a British paperback group name and imprint established in 1983 upon the purchase by William Collins, Sons of Granada Publishing Ltd, a subsidiary of media company Granada Group Ltd, to replace the Granada group name and imprint. It used the publishing company's then editorial offices' street address, 8 Grafton Street, in central London. Other paperback imprints of Granada Publishing at the time included Paladin, later home of the Paladin Poetry Series, Panther and Mayflower. The collaboration with hardback publishers Jonathan Cape, Chatto and Windus and The Bodley Head which in 1976 had resulted in the creation of Triad, and Triad/Panther Books paperbacks, which latter now became Triad/Grafton Books.

The Glasgow-based publishers William Collins, Sons, also used the name Grafton to consolidate all (or almost all) of Granada Publishing's paperback imprints under the one name (a process started by the Granada Publishing Group, using Granada) alongside its pre-existing Fontana paperback imprint.

Collins was in turn bought by Rupert Murdoch's News Corporation in 1989 to create the HarperCollins publishing conglomerate. The name Grafton disappeared as a separate brand c. 1993.

The Grafton imprint has no connection with the Grafton Books series of books on librarianship, bibliography and book collecting published by Andre Deutsch.

== Authors ==
They have published Michael Moorcock's books, among many others.
