= 1970 in science fiction =

The year 1970 was marked, in science fiction, by the following:

== Events ==
- The 28th annual Worldcon, Heicon '70, was held in Heidelberg, West Germany
- The first Seiun Awards, for Japanese science fiction, are awarded.
- The Pilgrim Awards, for science fiction research are established by the Science Fiction Research Association

== Births and deaths ==
=== Births ===
- Alex Garland

=== Deaths ===
- Leslie Perri

== Literary releases ==
=== Novels ===
- Tau Zero, by Poul Anderson
- Time and Again, by Jack Finney
- Ringworld, by Larry Niven
- Dance the Eagle to Sleep, by Marge Piercy

=== Children's books ===
- The Incredible Tide, by Alexander Key

=== Comics ===
- The first Yoko Tsuno story, by Roger Leloup, appears in Spirou magazine
- The first installment of La Guerra de los Antartes, by Héctor Germán Oesterheld and León Napoo debuts in Argentine magazine 2001

=== Non-fiction ===
- Science Fiction and Futurology, by Stanislaw Lem

== Movies ==
- Colossus: The Forbin Project, dir. by Joseph Sargent
- Crimes of the Future, dir. by David Cronenberg
- No Blade of Grass, dir. by Cornel Wilde

== Television ==
- Doomwatch

== Awards ==
=== Hugos ===
- Best novel: The Left Hand of Darkness, by Ursula K. Le Guin
- Best novella: Ship of Shadows, by Fritz Lieber
- Best short story: "Time Considered as a Helix of Semi-Precious Stones", by Samuel R. Delany
- Best dramatic presentation: "TV coverage of Apollo XI"
- Best professional magazine: The Magazine of Fantasy and Science Fiction, ed. by Edward L. Ferman
- Best professional artist: Frank Kelly Freas
- Best fanzine: Science Fiction Review, ed. by Richard E. Geis
- Best fan writer: Wilson Tucker
- Best fan artist: Tim Kirk

=== Nebulas ===
- Best novel: Ringworld, by Larry Niven
- Best novella: Ill Met in Lankhmar, by Fritz Lieber
- Best novelette: "Slow Sculpture", by Theodore Sturgeon
- Best short story: No award

=== Other awards ===
- BSFA Award for Best Novel: The Jagged Orbit, by John Brunner
