= Hugo Award for Best Professional Magazine =

Science fiction award presented between 1953 and 1972

- Awarded for: The best professional magazine devoted primarily to science fiction or fantasy
- Presented by: World Science Fiction Society
- First award: 1953
- Final award: 1972
- Website: thehugoawards.org

The Hugo Award for Best Professional Magazine was one of the Hugo Awards given each year for professionally edited magazines related to science fiction or fantasy and which had published four or more issues with at least one issue appearing in the previous calendar year. The Hugo Awards have been described as "a fine showcase for speculative fiction" and "the best known literary award for science fiction writing".

The award was first presented in 1953, the first year any Hugo Award was given, and with the exception of 1954 was given annually through 1972 when it was retired in favor of the newly created professional editor category. For the 1957 awards, the category was split into American and British magazine categories, a distinction which was not repeated any other year. In addition to the regular Hugo awards, beginning in 1996 Retrospective Hugo Awards, or "Retro Hugos", have been available to be awarded for years 50, 75, or 100 years prior in which no awards were given. To date, Retro Hugo awards have been awarded for 1946, 1951, and 1954, but only for the professional editor category, not the professional magazine category that would have existed at the time.

During the nineteen nomination years, twelve magazines run by fifteen editors were finalists. Of these, only five magazines run by eight editors won. Astounding Science-Fiction/Analog Science Fact & Fiction and The Magazine of Fantasy & Science Fiction each won eight times, out of eighteen and fifteen nominations, respectively. If won three of five final ballot nominations, New Worlds won one of its six nominations—though its win was in the 1957 "British Professional Magazine" category—and Galaxy Science Fiction won only one out of its fifteen nominations, for the first award in 1953. Of the magazines which never won, Amazing Stories was nominated the most at eight times, while the only other magazine to be nominated more than twice was Science Fantasy with three nominations. John W. Campbell Jr. received both the most nominations and awards, as he edited Analog Science Fact & Fiction for all eighteen nominations and eight wins. Edward L. Ferman and Robert P. Mills both won four times, while Frederik Pohl won three. H. L. Gold received the second most nominations at twelve, while Cele Goldsmith received the most nominations without winning at ten for her work on two separate magazines; she was the only female editor to be nominated.

== Selection ==
Hugo Award nominees and winners are chosen by supporting or attending members of the annual World Science Fiction Convention (Worldcon) and the presentation evening constitutes its central event. The selection process was defined during the category's tenure in the World Science Fiction Society Constitution as instant-runoff voting with five finalists, except in the case of a tie. These five works on the ballot are the five most-nominated by members that year, with no limit on the number of works that can be nominated. The 1953 through 1956 and 1958 awards did not include any recognition of runner-up magazines, but since 1959 all five candidates were recorded. Initial nominations are made by members in January through March, while voting on the ballot of five finalists is performed roughly in April through July, subject to change depending on when that year's Worldcon is held. Worldcons are generally held near the start of September, and are held in a different city around the world each year.

== Winners and finalists ==
In the following table, the years correspond to the date of the ceremony, rather than when the work was first published. Each date links to the "year in literature" article corresponding with when the work was eligible. Entries with a yellow background and an asterisk (*) next to the work's name have won the award; those with a gray background are the finalists on the short-list. For 1957, when the awards were split into a "Best Professional American Magazine" and "Best Professional British Magazine", the year column is marked as to which category the works were entered in. Note that Astounding Science-Fiction and Analog Science Fact & Fiction are the same magazine; no other magazine finalist underwent a name change during the period the award was active.

* Winners and joint winners

Winners and finalists
Year	Work	Editor(s)	Ref.
1953	Astounding Science-Fiction*	John W. Campbell, Jr.	
1953	Galaxy Science Fiction*	H. L. Gold	
1955	Astounding Science-Fiction*	John W. Campbell, Jr.	
1956	Astounding Science-Fiction*	John W. Campbell, Jr.	
1957 (American)	Astounding Science-Fiction*	John W. Campbell, Jr.	
1957 (American)	The Magazine of Fantasy & Science Fiction	Anthony Boucher	
1957 (American)	Galaxy Science Fiction	H. L. Gold	
1957 (American)	Infinity Science Fiction	Larry T. Shaw	
1957 (British)	New Worlds*	John Carnell	
1957 (British)	Nebula Science Fiction	Peter Hamilton	
1958	The Magazine of Fantasy & Science Fiction*	Anthony Boucher and Robert P. Mills	
1959	The Magazine of Fantasy & Science Fiction*	Anthony Boucher and Robert P. Mills	
1959	Astounding Science-Fiction	John W. Campbell, Jr.	
1959	Galaxy Science Fiction	H. L. Gold	
1959	Infinity Science Fiction	Larry T. Shaw	
1959	New Worlds	Michael Moorcock	
1960	The Magazine of Fantasy & Science Fiction*	Robert P. Mills	
1960	Amazing Stories	Cele Goldsmith	
1960	Astounding Science-Fiction	John W. Campbell, Jr.	
1960	Galaxy Science Fiction	H. L. Gold	
1960	Fantastic Universe	Hans Stefan Santesson	
1961	Analog Science Fact & Fiction*	John W. Campbell, Jr.	
1961	Amazing Stories	Cele Goldsmith	
1961	The Magazine of Fantasy & Science Fiction	Robert P. Mills	
1962	Analog Science Fact & Fiction*	John W. Campbell, Jr.	
1962	Amazing Stories	Cele Goldsmith	
1962	The Magazine of Fantasy & Science Fiction	Robert P. Mills and Avram Davidson	
1962	Galaxy Science Fiction	H. L. Gold	
1962	Science Fantasy	John Carnell	
1963	The Magazine of Fantasy & Science Fiction*	Robert P. Mills and Avram Davidson	
1963	Analog Science Fact & Fiction	John W. Campbell, Jr.	
1963	Fantastic	Cele Goldsmith	
1963	Galaxy Science Fiction	H. L. Gold	
1963	Science Fantasy	John Carnell	
1964	Analog Science Fact & Fiction*	John W. Campbell, Jr.	
1964	Amazing Stories	Cele Goldsmith	
1964	The Magazine of Fantasy & Science Fiction	Robert P. Mills and Avram Davidson	
1964	Galaxy Science Fiction	H. L. Gold	
1964	Science Fantasy	John Carnell	
1965	Analog Science Fact & Fiction*	John W. Campbell, Jr.	
1965	The Magazine of Fantasy & Science Fiction	Robert P. Mills and Avram Davidson	
1965	Galaxy Science Fiction	Frederik Pohl	
1965	If	Frederik Pohl	
1966	If*	Frederik Pohl	
1966	Amazing Stories	Cele Goldsmith	
1966	Analog Science Fact & Fiction	John W. Campbell, Jr.	
1966	The Magazine of Fantasy & Science Fiction	Robert P. Mills and Avram Davidson	
1966	Galaxy Science Fiction	H. L. Gold	
1967	If*	Frederik Pohl	
1967	Analog Science Fact & Fiction	John W. Campbell, Jr.	
1967	Galaxy Science Fiction	H. L. Gold	
1967	New Worlds	Michael Moorcock	
1968	If*	Frederik Pohl	
1968	Analog Science Fact & Fiction	John W. Campbell, Jr.	
1968	The Magazine of Fantasy & Science Fiction	Edward L. Ferman	
1968	Galaxy Science Fiction	H. L. Gold	
1968	New Worlds	Michael Moorcock	
1969	The Magazine of Fantasy & Science Fiction*	Edward L. Ferman	
1969	Analog Science Fact & Fiction	John W. Campbell, Jr.	
1969	Galaxy Science Fiction	H. L. Gold	
1969	If	Frederik Pohl	
1969	New Worlds	Michael Moorcock	
1970	The Magazine of Fantasy & Science Fiction*	Edward L. Ferman	
1970	Amazing Stories	Cele Goldsmith	
1970	Analog Science Fact & Fiction	John W. Campbell, Jr.	
1970	Galaxy Science Fiction	Ejler Jakobsson	
1970	New Worlds	Michael Moorcock	
1971	The Magazine of Fantasy & Science Fiction*	Edward L. Ferman	
1971	Amazing Stories	Cele Goldsmith	
1971	Analog Science Fact & Fiction	John W. Campbell, Jr.	
1971	Galaxy Science Fiction	Ejler Jakobsson	
1971	Visions of Tomorrow	Ron Graham	
1972	The Magazine of Fantasy & Science Fiction*	Edward L. Ferman	
1972	Amazing Stories	Cele Goldsmith	
1972	Analog Science Fact & Fiction	John W. Campbell, Jr.	
1972	Fantastic	Cele Goldsmith	
1972	Galaxy Science Fiction	Ejler Jakobsson	
