= Space Adventure =

Space Adventure or Space Adventures, or variation, may refer to:

- space opera, a genre of scifi
- The Space Adventure (video game) (コブラII: 伝説の男, Kobura II: Densetsu no Otoko, Cobra II: The Legendary Bandit), a video game based on the Japanese manga comic book series Space Adventures Cobra
- Space Adventures (comics), a U.S. anthology comic book series
- GURPS Space Adventures, the Space Adventures module for the GURPS RPG system
- Space Adventures – Music from 'Doctor Who' 1963–1968 (album), a 1987 album of BBC background music
- Space Adventures, a space tourism company
- "Space Adventure" (The Brak Show), a 2007 webisode
- "Space Adventure", a 2011 episode from season 3 of Mickey Mouse Clubhouse
- Space Adventures, one of Sol Cohen's reprint science fiction magazines

== See also ==
- The Great Space Adventure (film), a 1963 film
- Adventure (disambiguation)
- Keymon & Nani in Space Adventure, a 2012 Indian animated film
