= Joseph W. Ferman =

American writer (1906–1974)

Joseph Wolfe Ferman (June 8, 1906 – December 29, 1974) is a Russian–born American science fiction publisher.

== Biography ==
Ferman moved to the United States and began working on the magazine American Mercury, the primary publication of the Mercury Press, which added Ellery Queen's Mystery Magazine in 1941. He was involved with the founding of The Magazine of Fantasy and Science Fiction in 1949, and became the magazine's publisher in 1954, after Lawrence Spivak resigned to pursue his interest in the television series Meet the Press. Ferman became the magazine's official editor in 1964 although his son Edward L. Ferman did the actual editing. Edward succeeded him as publisher in 1970, with Joseph taking the title "Chairman of the Board" of what had become a family business.

In 1957, he founded Venture Science Fiction Magazine with Robert P. Mills as its editor. When the Fermans relaunched the magazine again more than a decade later, Edward Ferman served as editor. Other notable projects included the anthologies No Limits (1964), with stories taken from the pages of the first run of Venture, and Once and Future Tales (1964) with stories from F&SF, but not part of the Best from Fantasy and Science Fiction series. Both of these anthologies may have been ghost-edited by Edward Ferman. Joseph Ferman also published such magazines as Mercury Mystery Book-Magazine, Bestseller Mystery Magazine, the nostalgia magazine P. S. and the proto-New Age magazine Inner Space.

Ferman lived in Rockville Centre, New York, and he died at South Nassau Communities Hospital in Oceanside, New York, in 1974.
