= Strange Fantasy =

Strange Fantasy may refer to:

- Strange Fantasy (comic), a 1952 horror comic
- Strange Fantasy, one of Sol Cohen's reprint science fiction magazines
