= Locus Award for Best Magazine =

The Locus Award for Best Magazine is one of the annual Locus Awards presented by the science fiction and fantasy magazine Locus. Awards presented in a given year are for works published in the previous calendar year. The award for Best Magazine was originally presented in 1971.

== Winners ==
Award winners
Year	Nominated work	Editor	Ref.
1971	The Magazine of Fantasy & Science Fiction		
1972	The Magazine of Fantasy & Science Fiction		
1973	The Magazine of Fantasy & Science Fiction		
1974	The Magazine of Fantasy & Science Fiction	Edward L. Ferman	
1975	The Magazine of Fantasy & Science Fiction	Edward L. Ferman	
1976	The Magazine of Fantasy & Science Fiction		
1977	The Magazine of Fantasy & Science Fiction	Edward L. Ferman	
1978	The Magazine of Fantasy & Science Fiction	Edward L. Ferman	
1979	The Magazine of Fantasy & Science Fiction	Edward L. Ferman	
1980	The Magazine of Fantasy & Science Fiction		
1981	The Magazine of Fantasy & Science Fiction		
1982	The Magazine of Fantasy & Science Fiction		
1983	Locus		
1984	Locus		
1985	Locus		
1986	Locus		
1987	The Magazine of Fantasy & Science Fiction		
1988	Asimov's Science Fiction		
1989	Asimov's Science Fiction		
1990	Asimov's Science Fiction		
1991	Asimov's Science Fiction		
1992	Asimov's Science Fiction		
1993	Asimov's Science Fiction		
1994	Asimov's Science Fiction		
1995	Asimov's Science Fiction		
1996	Asimov's Science Fiction		
1997	Asimov's Science Fiction		
1998	Asimov's Science Fiction		
1999	Asimov's Science Fiction		
2000	Asimov's Science Fiction		
2001	Asimov's Science Fiction		
2002	The Magazine of Fantasy & Science Fiction		
2003	The Magazine of Fantasy & Science Fiction		
2004	The Magazine of Fantasy & Science Fiction		
2005	The Magazine of Fantasy & Science Fiction		
2006	The Magazine of Fantasy & Science Fiction		
2007	The Magazine of Fantasy & Science Fiction		
2008	The Magazine of Fantasy & Science Fiction		
2009	The Magazine of Fantasy & Science Fiction		
2010	The Magazine of Fantasy & Science Fiction		
2011	Asimov's Science Fiction		
2012			
2013	Asimov's Science Fiction		
2014	Asimov's Science Fiction		
2015	Tor.com		
2016	Asimov's Science Fiction		
2017	Tor.com		
2018	Tor.com		
2019	Tor.com		
2020	Tor.com		
2021	Tor.com		
2022	Tor.com		
2023	Tor.com		
2024	Uncanny Magazine		
2025	Clarkesworld		
2026	Clarkesworld		
