= Sol Cohen's reprint science fiction magazines =

Between 1965 and 1976, Sol Cohen published over a hundred issues of science fiction magazines under a set of related titles.

== Sol Cohen ==
In March 1965, Ziff Davis sold two of their magazines, Amazing Stories and Fantastic, to Sol Cohen. As part of the deal, Cohen acquired all the rights that Ziff Davis had had to the stories published in previous issues of the magazines; this generally included second serial rights, and in some cases may have included all rights. Cohen interpreted this to mean that he could reprint any stories he wished from the magazines' backfile, without needing to pay the authors. Joseph Wrzos, the editor of both magazines, persuaded Cohen to include one new story in each issue, but other than that Cohen instructed Wrzos to use only reprinted stories. In the meantime Cohen decided to take further advantage of his ownership of the serial rights by launching additional magazines to reprint them.

Between 1965 and 1976, Sol Cohen published over a hundred issues of reprint magazines under various titles. Cohen and his business partner, Arthur Bernhard, operating as Ultimate Publishing Company, continued to publish Amazing and Fantastic after his acquisition, but changed their editorial policy to run reprints almost entirely. This brought Cohen into conflict with the Science Fiction Writers of America (SFWA), a professional writers' organization formed in 1965. Soon SFWA called for a boycott of Ultimate's magazines until Cohen agreed to make payments. Cohen agreed to pay a flat fee for all stories, and then in August 1967 this was changed to a graduated rate, depending on the length of the story.

=== Great Science Fiction ===
The first of Cohen's reprint magazines was Great Science Fiction, which appeared in December 1965, titled Great Science Fiction from Amazing. It reprinted stories that had appeared in Amazing between 1959 and 1961, including stories by Isaac Asimov, James Blish, and Robert Bloch. The second issue followed in March, this time titled Great Science Fiction from Fantastic, with stories by J.G. Ballard, Robert Bloch, and Cordwainer Smith, again from the end of the 1950s and the start of the 1960s. More issues followed on an irregular schedule, and the title was changed to just Great Science Fiction by issue #6, which came out in early 1967. With the eighth issue the date, Fall 1967, appeared on the cover. Via negotiations with SFWA about reprint fees, Harry Harrison had agreed to take over the editorship of Amazing and Fantastic, and had also agreed to allow his name to be listed as editor from the tenth issue, though Cohen was still making all the editorial decisions. Harrison also wrote two editorials. Further conflict with SFWA was finally resolved in 1969, with the help of Robert Silverberg, SFWA's president that year; Cohen put together an all-Silverberg issue for Winter 1969, and retitled the magazine Science Fiction Greats. An all-Harlan Ellison issue followed, but none of the remaining issues were focused on a single author. The final issue was dated Spring 1971.

Science fiction historian Mike Ashley suggests that Great Science Fiction was the best of Cohen's reprint magazines, because he chose material from Cele Goldsmith's period in charge, a high point in the magazine's history.

=== Thrilling Science Fiction ===
With Great Science Fiction under way, Cohen launched a second reprint title in the summer of 1966, titled The Most Thrilling Science Fiction Ever Told, on a quarterly schedule. As with Great Science Fiction these were initially undated. No editor was credited; Cohen was the editor, but with issue nine, dated Summer 1968, Harry Harrison's name appeared as editor, though in fact he had nothing to do with the magazine except to contribute two editorials. For the first few issues the contents were selected from Cele Goldsmith's editorship, and Ashley comments that the first three issues were the best of Thrilling's run. Issues 10-12 published two short novels, rather than a selection of short stories, featuring Murray Leinster, Jack Vance, and James H. Schmitz, among others. With issue thirteen the format reverted to short stories from Goldsmith's era.

The following issue saw the title change to Thrilling Science Fiction Adventures, and the stories, which now came from the 1940s and 1950s, were much weaker—Ashley describes them as "skeletons from SF's cupboard...that should have been allowed to rest in peace and paraded like zombies in a world of science fiction that was alien to them". This reprint policy stayed in place until issue 23, dated February 1972, except for Fall 1970 (issue 17) which reverted to the earlier title and policy, using stories from Goldsmith's editorship. The title was shortened to just Thrilling Science Fiction with issue 19, and did not change again. The magazine became bimonthly starting with issue 22, dated December 1971, and from June 1972 the stories were again taken from Goldsmith's era, with occasional selections from other editors. In April 1975 Cohen announced that Thrilling had absorbed Science Fiction Adventures, one of his other titles, and would take over that magazine's policy of reprinting a famous classic in every issue, but in the event only one more issue appeared, dated July 1975.

=== Science Fiction Classics, Strange Fantasy, and Space Adventures ===
By the time Cohen launched Science Fiction Classics, in 1967, the disagreement with SFWA over reprint fees persuaded Cohen to publish the magazine under a new imprint, and with false names on the masthead. The publisher was Magazine Productions, rather than Ultimate Publishing, and Cohen and Herb Lehrman, the assistant editor, appeared under the names Jack Lester and Ralph Adris. The magazine was Lehrman's idea, and it was the only one of Cohen's magazines for which Lehrman took responsibility for story selection. Lehrman left in 1968, after six issues, and Cohen retitled the magazine Science Fiction Adventure Classics for one issue in early 1969, but the next magazine to appear, in the spring of that year, was titled Strange Fantasy. This appeared to be another retitling of SF Classics, since the issue was numbered 8, but in fact Cohen was simply using the existing distribution relationship to try a different magazine with a fantasy orientation. Later that year an eighth issue of SF Classics appeared, and Strange Fantasy began producing more issues, continuing the numbering from 8, and establishing that it was indeed a separate magazine. An almost identical confusion began with the appearance in early 1970 of Space Adventures, with an issue number of 9, again appearing to be a new title for SF Classics—in fact it was clear it had been originally typeset under the old title, since all the even-numbered pages carried the running title S-F Adventures Classics. Three more quarterly issues of Space Adventures appeared in 1970, numbered 10, 11, and 12, and that summer Cohen published another new title, Science Fiction Classics Annual. It turned out that neither of these was not a continuation of SF Classics: only one issue of SF Adventures Classics ever appeared, and in the winter of 1970 Cohen brought out another issue of SF Adventure Classics, numbered 12. Thereafter all three magazines went their separate ways, with Strange Fantasy publishing six issues, numbered 8 through 13, in 1969 and 1970; Space Adventures publishing six issues numbered 9 through 14 in 1970 and 1971, and SF Adventure Classics picking up at issue 12 and continuing through issue 33, dated November 1974.

The reprints in the first six issues of SF Classics were taken from the first few years of Amazing Stories with no issues later than 1933, and included authors such as John Campbell, Edmond Hamilton, David H. Keller and Murray Leinster. Ashley describes the selection as weak, with many "quaint and dated" stories, but adds that serious fans of the genre would have been glad of the chance to re-read some stories that had a reputation as classics, such as "When the Atoms Failed", John Campbell's first published story, and "The Gostak and the Doshes", by Miles J. Breuer. The early reprint policy ended with the seventh issue, which was filled with stories by Edmond Hamilton. The eighth issue took all its fiction from the April 1956 issue of Amazing Stories. Not long before Cohen had acquired Amazing Stories it had run a "Classic Reprint" section, with stories selected by Sam Moskowitz. After the hiatus in which Strange Fantasy and Space Adventures appeared, issue 12 reprinted some of these stories, along with the new introductions Moskowitz had provided for the first reprinting. From issue 13 onwards, SF Adventure Classics reprinted material from Amazing Stories, from the first years of Ray Palmer's time as editor. Palmer had taken over as editor of Amazing in 1938, and Ashley describes the material reprinted from this period as "mostly hack work churned out by a stable of writers to Palmer's editorial order". A few of the chosen reprints have better reputations; Ashley lists William F. Temple's "Mr. Cradock's Amazing Experience", in issue 14, as one of the better-written stories, and describes Temple's "The 4-Sided Triangle", in issue 17, as "of justifiable classic status". Other frequently appearing authors including John Russell Fearn, under his own name and pseudonyms, and Festus Pragnell, Don Wilcox, Ed Earl Repp, Neil R. Jones, and Leroy Yerxa.

Strange Fantasy mostly selected material from 1960s issues of Fantastic, edited by Cele Goldsmith Lalli. According to Ashley the stories chosen did not always reflect the high quality of the source issues: despite including work by Ursula Le Guin, Fritz Leiber, Harlan Ellision, J.G. Ballard, and Roger Zelazny, "only one or two stories per issue [were] worthy of resurrection". Highlights included "Midnight in the Mirror World" by Leiber, "Elixir for the Emperor" by John Brunner, Le Guin's "The Word of Unbinding, and Zelazny's "Thelinde's Song", a Dilvish the Damned story. Space Adventures, like SF Classics, reprinted material from Palmer's time as editor of Amazing; Ashley describes the stories as "of little value, though a few are superficially interesting", and names Mack Reynolds' and Kris Neville's work as more interesting than most of the magazines contents. Some interior illustrations from the original magazine were reprinted as well, including work by Virgil Finlay.

=== Other titles ===
Cohen tried several other titles during 1970, but none lasted. Astounding Stories Yearbook and The Strangest Stories Ever Told appeared that summer; the former produced one more issue that fall. Weird Mystery published its first issue in the fall of 1970, and three more appeared on a quarterly schedule, ending with the Summer 1971 issue. After this Cohen produced no new magazines except for one issue of Sword & Sorcery Annual, which appeared in 1975. This was a departure for Cohen: the lead story, Robert E. Howard's "Queen of the Black Coast", which featured Howard's creation Conan the Barbarian, had originally been published in Weird Tales in 1934, so Cohen had not acquired the reprint rights in his 1965 deal with Ziff-Davis. He paid for the rights, and acquired cover artwork and interior illustrations from Steve Fabian; Ashley comments that the result was "far superior in appearance to the other Cohen reprint magazines".

== Issue grid ==
Issue numbers and release dates. Underlined numbers were titled with the season; the others were undated or were titled with the month.
Year	Title	Win	Spr			Sum			Fal			Win	
		Jan	Feb	Mar	Apr	May	Jun	Jul	Aug	Sep	Oct	Nov	Dec
1965	Great Science Fiction												1
1966	Thrilling Science Fiction	1		2			3			4			
1966	Great Science Fiction			2			3			4			5
1967	Great Science Fiction			6			7			8			
1967	Thrilling Science Fiction			5						6			7
1967	Science Fiction Classics						1			2			3
1968	Great Science Fiction	9		10			11			12			
1968	Science Fiction Classics			4			5			6			
1968	Thrilling Science Fiction			8			9			10			11
1969	Great Science Fiction	13		14			15						16
1969	Science Fiction Classics	7								8			
1969	Strange Fantasy			8			9			10			
1969	Thrilling Science Fiction			12			13			14			
1970	Science Fiction Adventures Yearbook	1											
1970	Space Adventures	9		10			11						12
1970	Great Science Fiction			17			18			19			20
1970	Strange Fantasy			11			12			13			
1970	Thrilling Science Fiction			15			16			17			18
1970	Astounding Yearbook						1			2			
1970	The Strangest Stories Ever Told						1						
1970	Science Fiction Classics Annual									1			
1970	Weird Mystery									1			2
1970	Science Fiction Classics												12
1971	Great Science Fiction			21									
1971	Science Fiction Classics			13			14			15			
1971	Space Adventures			13			14						
1971	Thrilling Science Fiction			19			20			21			22
1971	Weird Mystery			3			4						
1972	Science Fiction Classics	16		17		18		19		20		21	
1972	Thrilling Science Fiction		23		24		25		26		27		28
1973	Science Fiction Classics	22		23		24		25		26		27	
1973	Thrilling Science Fiction		29		30		31		32		33		34
1974	Science Fiction Classics	28		29		30		31		32		33	
1974	Thrilling Science Fiction		35		36		37		38		39		40
1975	Sword & Sorcery Annual	1											
1975	Thrilling Science Fiction				41			42					

== Sources ==
- Ashley, Mike (1985a). "Astounding Stories Yearbook". In Tymn, Marshall B.; Ashley, Mike (eds.). Science Fiction, Fantasy and Weird Fiction Magazines. Westport, Connecticut: Greenwood Press. pp. 123–124. ISBN 978-0-313-21221-5.
- Ashley, Mike (1985b). "Great Science Fiction". In Tymn, Marshall B.; Ashley, Mike (eds.). Science Fiction, Fantasy and Weird Fiction Magazines. Westport, Connecticut: Greenwood Press. pp. 320–323. ISBN 978-0-313-21221-5.
- Ashley, Mike (1985c). "Science Fantasy". In Tymn, Marshall B.; Ashley, Mike (eds.). Science Fiction, Fantasy and Weird Fiction Magazines. Westport, Connecticut: Greenwood Press. p. 511. ISBN 978-0-313-21221-5.
- Ashley, Mike (1985d). "Science Fiction Adventures Yearbook". In Tymn, Marshall B.; Ashley, Mike (eds.). Science Fiction, Fantasy and Weird Fiction Magazines. Westport, Connecticut: Greenwood Press. pp. 529–530. ISBN 978-0-313-21221-5.
- Ashley, Mike (1985e). "Science Fiction Classics". In Tymn, Marshall B.; Ashley, Mike (eds.). Science Fiction, Fantasy and Weird Fiction Magazines. Westport, Connecticut: Greenwood Press. pp. 530–532. ISBN 978-0-313-21221-5.
- Ashley, Mike (1985f). "Science Fiction Classics Annual". In Tymn, Marshall B.; Ashley, Mike (eds.). Science Fiction, Fantasy and Weird Fiction Magazines. Westport, Connecticut: Greenwood Press. p. 533. ISBN 978-0-313-21221-5.
- Ashley, Mike (1985g). "Space Adventures". In Tymn, Marshall B.; Ashley, Mike (eds.). Science Fiction, Fantasy and Weird Fiction Magazines. Westport, Connecticut: Greenwood Press. pp. 581–582. ISBN 978-0-313-21221-5.
- Ashley, Mike (1985h). "Strange Fantasy". In Tymn, Marshall B.; Ashley, Mike (eds.). Science Fiction, Fantasy and Weird Fiction Magazines. Westport, Connecticut: Greenwood Press. pp. 621–622. ISBN 978-0-313-21221-5.
- Ashley, Mike (1985i). "The Strangest Stories Ever Told". In Tymn, Marshall B.; Ashley, Mike (eds.). Science Fiction, Fantasy and Weird Fiction Magazines. Westport, Connecticut: Greenwood Press. p. 628. ISBN 978-0-313-21221-5.
- Ashley, Mike (1985j). "Sword & Sorcery Annual". In Tymn, Marshall B.; Ashley, Mike (eds.). Science Fiction, Fantasy and Weird Fiction Magazines. Westport, Connecticut: Greenwood Press. p. 642. ISBN 978-0-313-21221-5.
- Ashley, Mike (1985k). "Thrilling Science Fiction". In Tymn, Marshall B.; Ashley, Mike (eds.). Science Fiction, Fantasy and Weird Fiction Magazines. Westport, Connecticut: Greenwood Press. pp. 667–670. ISBN 978-0-313-21221-5.
- Ashley, Mike (1985l). "Weird Mystery". In Tymn, Marshall B.; Ashley, Mike (eds.). Science Fiction, Fantasy and Weird Fiction Magazines. Westport, Connecticut: Greenwood Press. p. 724. ISBN 978-0-313-21221-5.
- Ashley, Mike (2005). Transformations: The Story of the Science Fiction Magazines from 1950 to 1970. Liverpool: Liverpool University Press. ISBN 978-0-85323-779-2.
- Ashley, Mike (2007). Gateways to Forever: The Story of the Science-Fiction Magazines from 1970 to 1980. Liverpool: Liverpool University Press. ISBN 978-1-84631-003-4.
