= Mercury Publications =

American publisher of fiction periodicals

Mercury Mystery Magazine (April 1959)

Mercury Publications (a.k.a. Mercury Press) was a magazine publishing company, initially owned and operated by Lawrence E. Spivak, which mainly published genre fiction in digest-sized formats. The focus of Spivak's line was on detective and mystery stories and novels, but it also included magazines about humor, fantasy, and true crime. The offices were located at 570 Lexington Avenue in New York, NY and in later years in Cornwall, Connecticut.

Spivak entered publishing in 1933 as the business manager of The American Mercury, and two years later, he became the magazine's publisher, expanding his operations in the late 1930s with additional titles. His subsidiary companies included Mystery House and Fantasy House. Two Mercury series were Mercury Library and Mercury Books.

Other Mercury imprints and titles included:

- Bestseller Mystery Books (a.k.a. Bestseller Library)
- Bestsellers magazine (beginning 1945), subtitled "Authorized Book Condensations"
- The Book of Wit & Humor, edited by Louis Untermeyer and Charles Angoff
- Ellery Queen's Mystery Magazine, edited by Frederic Dannay
- Jonathan Press Mystery Books
- The Magazine of Fantasy & Science Fiction, initially edited by Anthony Boucher and J. Francis McComas
- Mercury Mystery (a.k.a. Mercury Mystery Book Magazine and Mercury Mystery Magazine), edited by Joseph W. Ferman
- True Crime Detective, edited by Edward D. Radin, and then by Boucher and McComas

Spivak launched his Bestseller Library series in 1938, with a new title each month. In 1940, he split the Bestseller Library into Mercury Mysteries and Bestseller Mysteries. Ellery Queen's Mystery Magazine began in 1941, followed by the Jonathan Press Mysteries imprint in 1942. Mercury Mystery Book Magazine continued the long-run series of full-length and condensed mystery novels published in a digest-sized format, beginning with the title of Mercury Mystery in March 1940. Starting with #210, it ran for 23 issues before merging with Bestseller Mystery Magazine. The Magazine of Fantasy & Science Fiction began in 1949 under the title The Magazine of Fantasy. In the fall of 1950, Spivak sold The American Mercury to millionaire investment banker Clendenin J. Ryan, and his editor was William Bradford Huie.

Joseph W. Ferman was the business manager of Mercury Publications from 1940 to 1950. The Mercury art director from 1938 to 1958 was designer George Salter, who created about 750 covers for Mercury Publications during that time frame. After leaving the art director position, he continued to design covers for Mercury.The Mercury Press name continued on Fantasy and Science Fiction (eventually its only publication) under Joseph and his son Edward L. Ferman until F&SF was sold to Gordon Van Gelder in 2000.
