= Venture Science Fiction =

Science fiction magazine

July 1958 issue of Venture, the last issue of the magazine's first version. The cover is by Ed Emshwiller, illustrating Lester del Rey's "Lady of Space".

Venture Science Fiction was an American digest-size science fiction magazine, first published from 1957 to 1958, and revived for a brief run in 1969 and 1970. Ten issues were published of the 1950s version, with another six in the second run. It was founded in both instances as a companion to The Magazine of Fantasy & Science Fiction. Robert P. Mills edited the 1950s version, and Edward L. Ferman was editor during the second run. A British edition appeared for 28 issues between 1963 and 1965; it reprinted material from The Magazine of Fantasy & Science Fiction as well as from the US edition of Venture. There was also an Australian edition, which was identical to the British version but dated two months later.

The original version was only moderately successful, although it is remembered for the first publication of Sturgeon's Law. The publisher, Joseph Ferman (father of Edward Ferman), declared that he wanted well-told stories of action and adventure; the resulting fiction contained more sex and violence than was usual for the science fiction (SF) genre in the late 1950s, and SF historian Mike Ashley has suggested that the magazine was ahead of its time. It succumbed to poor sales within less than two years. The second US version was no more successful, with less attractive cover art and little in the way of notable fiction, though it did publish Vonda McIntyre's first story. By the end of 1970, Venture had ceased publication permanently.

== First US run ==
In late 1949, publisher Lawrence E. Spivak launched The Magazine of Fantasy, one of many new titles in a crowded field of genre magazines. The title was changed to The Magazine of Fantasy & Science Fiction (usually abbreviated to F&SF) with the second issue, and the new magazine rapidly became successful and influential within the science fiction field. The editors were Anthony Boucher and J. Francis McComas, and the managing editor was Robert P. Mills. In 1954, Joseph Ferman, a partner of Spivak's, bought the magazine from him. Ferman subsequently decided to launch a companion magazine, and gave it to Mills to edit.

The new magazine was titled Venture Science Fiction, and the first issue was dated January 1957. Mills was managing editor of F&SF throughout Venture's first run; he became editor of F&SF shortly after Venture ceased publishing in July 1958. The editorial philosophy was laid out by Ferman in the inaugural issue: "strong stories of action and adventure ... There will be two prime requisites for Venture stories: In the first place, each must be a well-told story, with a beginning, middle and end; in the second place, each must be a strong story—a story with pace, power and excitement." Ferman hoped to take advantage of a gap in the science fiction magazine market opened up by the demise of Planet Stories, one of the last sf pulps, which had ceased publication in late 1955. Planet Stories had focused on adventure stories, as opposed to the realistic style becoming more popular in science fiction in the 1950s, and Ferman hoped to combine the virtues of the melodramatic pulp fiction style with the literary values that were key to F&SF's success. Venture's bias towards action-oriented adventure led to stories with relatively more sex and violence than those in competing magazines, and sf historian Mike Ashley has commented that it was perhaps five or ten years ahead of its time. One story, "The Girl Had Guts", by Theodore Sturgeon, involved an alien virus that caused its victims to vomit up their intestines; Ashley records a reviewer saying that the story made him physically ill.

Ed Emshwiller supplied eight of the ten covers; he had sold several covers to F&SF by this time, so his work reinforced the sense of connection between the two magazines. Emshwiller also contributed interior illustrations in the first issue, but the main interior artist was John Giunta, with John Schoenherr contributing some of his earliest work to several of the later issues.

Some well-known writers appeared during this incarnation of Venture, including Isaac Asimov, Clifford Simak, Marion Zimmer Bradley, Robert Silverberg, and Damon Knight. Not all the fiction was adventure oriented. For example, Sturgeon's story "The Comedian's Children" tells of a telethon host and his relationship with his sponsors, and Leigh Brackett's "All the Colors of the Rainbow" deals with racism after aliens have contacted humanity. These and other examples can be regarded as stories of character with strong themes, in keeping with Ferman's stated goals in his inaugural editorial. Venture was also the place that "Sturgeon's Law" first saw print. This adage is now usually seen in the form "90% of everything is crap". It was formulated by Sturgeon in about 1951, and a version of it appeared in the March 1958 issue of Venture, under the name "Sturgeon's Revelation".

An editorial, "Venturings," appeared in each issue of the first series; after Ferman used the first one as a platform for editorial policy, it was usually written by Mills, who occasionally turned the column over to letters from SF figures. The last editorial, in July 1958, featured a eulogy of C. M. Kornbluth by Frederik Pohl, and one of Henry Kuttner by Sturgeon. Kornbluth and Kuttner had died within two months of each other earlier that year.

Sturgeon began a book review column, "On Hand ... Offhand", in the July 1957 issue that continued for the rest of the magazine's run. This was Sturgeon's first review column; more than a decade later he wrote a similar column for Galaxy Science Fiction. The January 1958 issue saw the first in a series of four science articles by Asimov that also continued until Venture folded. The series was transferred to F&SF, beginning with the November 1958 issue, and eventually ran to 399 consecutive articles; it is not often remembered that it began in F&SF's short-lived companion magazine.

Venture kept to a steady bimonthly schedule for ten issues, but its circulation never reached a sustainable level, and it was canceled in mid-1958. The large number of competing magazines probably hurt sales, though since many of the competitors lasted for only one or two issues, Venture can be thought of as at least a partial success. An anthology drawn from the magazine's fiction, No Limits, was published in 1964 by Ballantine Books, attributed to Joseph Ferman as editor.

== British and Australian editions ==
In December 1959, a British edition of F&SF appeared from Atlas Publishing and Distributing Limited, a London-based publisher. Atlas had published a British edition of Analog (formerly Astounding Science Fiction) since 1939. In 1963 the abolition of import restrictions meant that Analog could be directly imported, and since there was no longer a need for a British edition, Atlas decided to start a new sf magazine to replace it. The new Venture Science Fiction drew many of its stories from the US version, but it also reprinted from the late 1950s F&SF, since there had been no British edition of that magazine until the end of 1959. Within a year Atlas decided to abandon their edition of F&SF as well; the last issue appeared in June 1964.

The British version of Venture began in September 1963, and ran for 28 numbered issues, through December 1965; the editor was Ronald R. Wickers. The stories selected from F&SF for the UK edition of Venture did not overlap with material already reprinted in the UK edition of F&SF. The first five issues had pictorial covers, but thereafter the cover simply listed the names of the contributing authors. This unattractive presentation, and the lack of much in the way of interior artwork, probably hurt sales. Atlas's stated reason for ending the magazine was that it was "due to the expiration of available material", but there were in fact many stories available to reprint. It is more likely that the real reason was that the US edition of F&SF was by then easily available in the UK, and that circulation was falling.

Atlas also published an Australian edition, which was identical to the British edition except that it was dated two months later; the issues ran from November 1963 to February 1966.

== Second US run ==
August 1970 issue of Venture; the last issue. The art is by Bert Tanner

A little over ten years after the first US edition ceased, a new version appeared, again as a companion to F&SF. This time the magazine was quarterly. The debut issue was dated May 1969, and it was edited by Edward L. Ferman—the son of Joseph Ferman—who was also the editor of F&SF. There was no statement of editorial intent for this version, but the policy was straightforward: a novel was presented in each issue. Although these were substantially cut, they still took up most of the magazine, with the result that the other stories tended to be very short. As in the first incarnation, the contents were of fairly good quality, with contributions from well-known writers. However, the magazine was no more successful than before, and lasted for only six quarterly issues; the last issue was August 1970.

The condensed novels that appeared in this version of Venture included Hour of the Horde, by Gordon R. Dickson; Plague Ship, by Harry Harrison; Star Treasure, by Keith Laumer; and Beastchild, by Dean R. Koontz. The short fiction included little of note, though "The Snows Are Melted, the Snows Are Gone", an early story by James Tiptree, Jr., appeared in 1969, and "Breaking Point", by Vonda McIntyre, was published in February 1970. "Breaking Point" was McIntyre's first published fiction, but, perhaps because it was published as by "V. N. McIntyre", it has been missed by several bibliographers. There was also a Reginald Bretnor Feghoot story in each issue: these were a series of very short stories, based on bad puns, that had begun in F&SF the previous year.

Ron Goulart contributed a book review column to each issue of the second incarnation, and there was an occasional film review. This version of Venture did not credit the artists, but most of the covers were signed by Bert Tanner, who was listed on the masthead as the art director. According to Nicholas De Larber, a historian of science fiction, Tanner's cover art was much less distinguished than Emshwiller's work for the first run of the magazine, and it is likely that this had a negative effect on sales: De Larbert likened Tanner's work to "pencil sketches overlaid by a single color". Tanner also contributed much, but not all, of the interior art; other artists who can by identified by their signatures include Emshwiller, Derek Carter, and Bhob Stewart, who illustrated Tiptree's story in the November 1969 issue.

== Bibliographic details ==
	Jan	Feb	Mar	Apr	May	Jun	Jul	Aug	Sep	Oct	Nov	Dec
1957	1/1		1/2		1/3		1/4		1/5		1/6	
1958	2/1			2/2		2/3		2/4				
1963									1	2	3	4
1964	5	6	7	8	9	10	11	12	13	14	15	16
1965	17	18	19	20	21	22	23	24	25	26	27	28
1969					3/1			3/2			3/3	
1970		4/1			4/2			4/3				
Issues of Venture, showing volume/issue number, and color-coded to show who was editor for each issue: Robert P. Mills for the first US version, Ronald R. Wickers for the UK edition, and Edward L. Ferman for the second US version.

For the first incarnation, Venture was priced at 35 cents throughout, and maintained a 128-page count along with a regular bimonthly schedule, starting with January 1957 and ending with the July 1958 issue. The first volume had six numbers, and the second had four. The British edition was numbered consecutively from 1 to 28 without any volume numbers, and was priced at 2/6 (£0.12 1/2) until the July 1964 issue, after which the price was 3/- (£0.15). The second US version began in May 1969 with volume 3 number 1, and maintained a regular quarterly schedule until the last issue in August 1970. Each issue was priced at 60 cents, and like its predecessor had a page count of 128.

After the first US edition ceased publication, F&SF added the line "including Venture Science Fiction" to the masthead, in order to ensure that the publisher retained the rights to the title. The line reappeared in February 1971, several months after the failure of the second US edition, and was finally dropped in February 1990.

== Sources ==
- Ashley, Michael (1978). The History of the Science Fiction Magazine, Part 4 1956–1965. London: New English Library. ISBN 0-450-03438-0.
- Ashley, Mike (2005). Transformations: The Story of the Science Fiction Magazines from 1950 to 1970. Liverpool: Liverpool University Press. ISBN 0-85323-779-4.
- Clute, John; Peter Nicholls (1993). The Encyclopedia of Science Fiction. New York: St. Martin's Press. ISBN 0-312-09618-6.
- Oxford English Dictionary: The Definitive Record of the English Language (3rd ed.). Oxford University Press.
- Tuck, Donald H. (1982). The Encyclopedia of Science Fiction and Fantasy. Vol. 3. Chicago: Advent: Publishers. ISBN 0-911682-26-0.
- Tymm, Marshall B.; Mike Ashley (1985). Science Fiction, Fantasy and Weird Fiction Magazines. Westport, Connecticut: Greenwood Press. ISBN 0-313-21221-X.
