= Youthful (publisher) =

Defunct American comic book publisher

- Founded: 1949
- Founder: Bill Friedman; Sophie Friedman
- Defunct: 1954
- Country of origin: United States
- Headquarters location: New York, New York
- Key people: Sol Cohen, Adrian Lopez
- Publication types: Comic books
- Fiction genres: Western, horror, humor, romance
- Imprints: Friedman

Youthful (also known as Youthful Magazines) was an American comic book publisher that operated from 1949 to 1954. The company was owned by attorney Bill Friedman and his wife Sophie. Adrian Lopez (1906–2004) had the title of publisher of the company for most of its existence. Comics editor Sol Cohen (possibly with help from financier Harry Donenfeld) helped launch Youthful.

== History ==
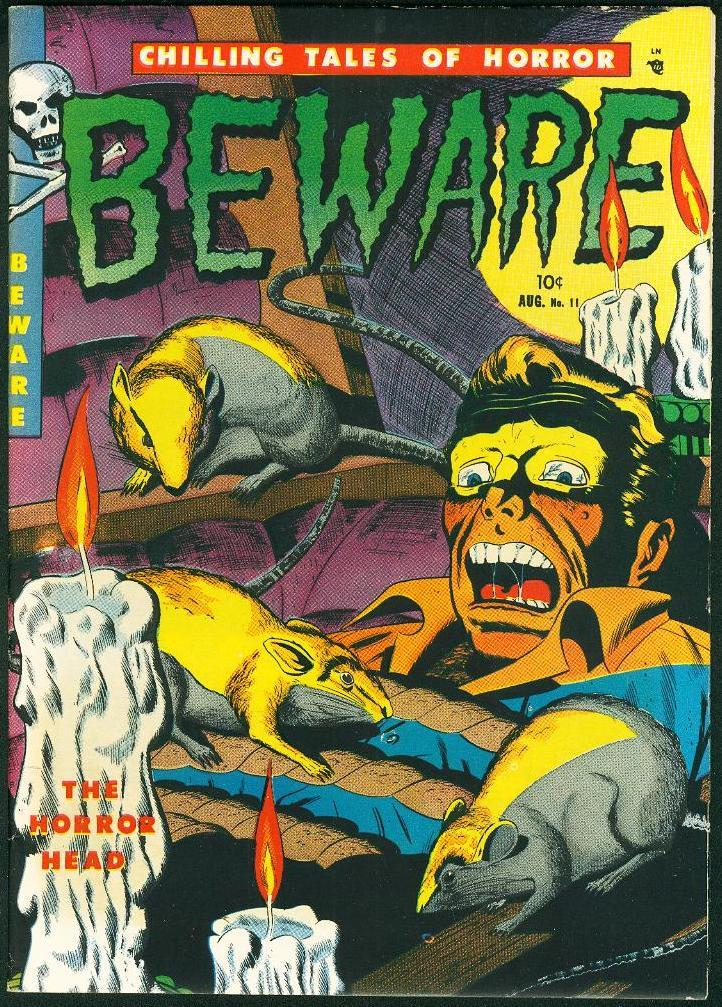
Beware #11, August 1952

The company specialized in non-superhero titles, instead focusing on horror, Western, humor, and romance comics. The company only published ten distinct titles, with many series changing their name and continuing the numbering of the previous title (like many comic book publishers of the era, to save money on second-class postage permits, Youthful frequently changed the titles of their comics rather than start new ones at #1). Titles published by Youthful included the Western titles Gunsmoke, Indian Fighter, and Redskin (later known as Famous Western Badmen); the science fiction/horror series Captain Science (later known as Fantastic, Beware, and Chilling Tales), and the humor title Jackpot.

Doug Wildey was the company's lead cartoonist, with work published in virtually all their titles. Other notable creators associated with Youthful included Bill Fraccio, Harry Harrison, Pat Masulli, Don Perlin, Wally Wood, Graham Ingels, Ed Goldfarb, Henry C. Kiefer, and Manny Stallman.

Youthful's first title was Gunsmoke, which debuted Apr./May 1949 and ran until 1952. Youthful acquired the Pix-Parade title Youthful Hearts in 1952, continuing its numbering under the new title Daring Confessions until 1953. The Youthful titles Attack and Beware were acquired by Trojan Magazines in 1952, which continued their numbering. Youthful, in turn, renamed the titles Atomic Attack and Chilling Tales, respectively, also continuing the numbering. The company was mostly finished by 1953, with only Jackpot continuing until 1954 (its final issue cover-dated May).

Youthful Magazines is not related to the Christian digital magazine and blog with the same name based in Lagos, Nigeria.

== Titles published ==
- Attack (4 issues, 1952) — acquired by Trojan Magazines
  - Atomic Attack (4 issues, 1953) — continues numbering of Attack
- Captain Science (7 issues, 1950–1951)
  - Fantastic (2 issues, 1952) — continues numbering of Captain Science
    - Beware (3 issues, 1952) — continues numbering of Fantastic, then acquired by Trojan Magazines
      - Chilling Tales (5 issues, 1952–1953) — continues numbering of Beware
- Daring Confessions (5 issues, 1952–1953) — continues numbering of Youthful Hearts (acquired from Pix-Parade)
- Gunsmoke (16 issues, 1949–1952)
- Indian Fighter (11 issues, 1950–1952)
- Jackpot (18 issues, 1952–1954)
- Redskin (12 issues, 1950–1952)
  - Famous Western Badmen (3 issues, 1952–1953) — continues numbering of Redskin
- Thrilling Adventures in Stamps Comics (8 issues, Oct 1951 – Jan 1953)
- Super Western Comics (1 issue, 1950)
  - Buffalo Bill (8 issues, 1950–1951) — continues numbering of Super Western Comics
- Youthful Love (1 issue, 1950)
