= Ron Goulart =

American historian (1933–2022)

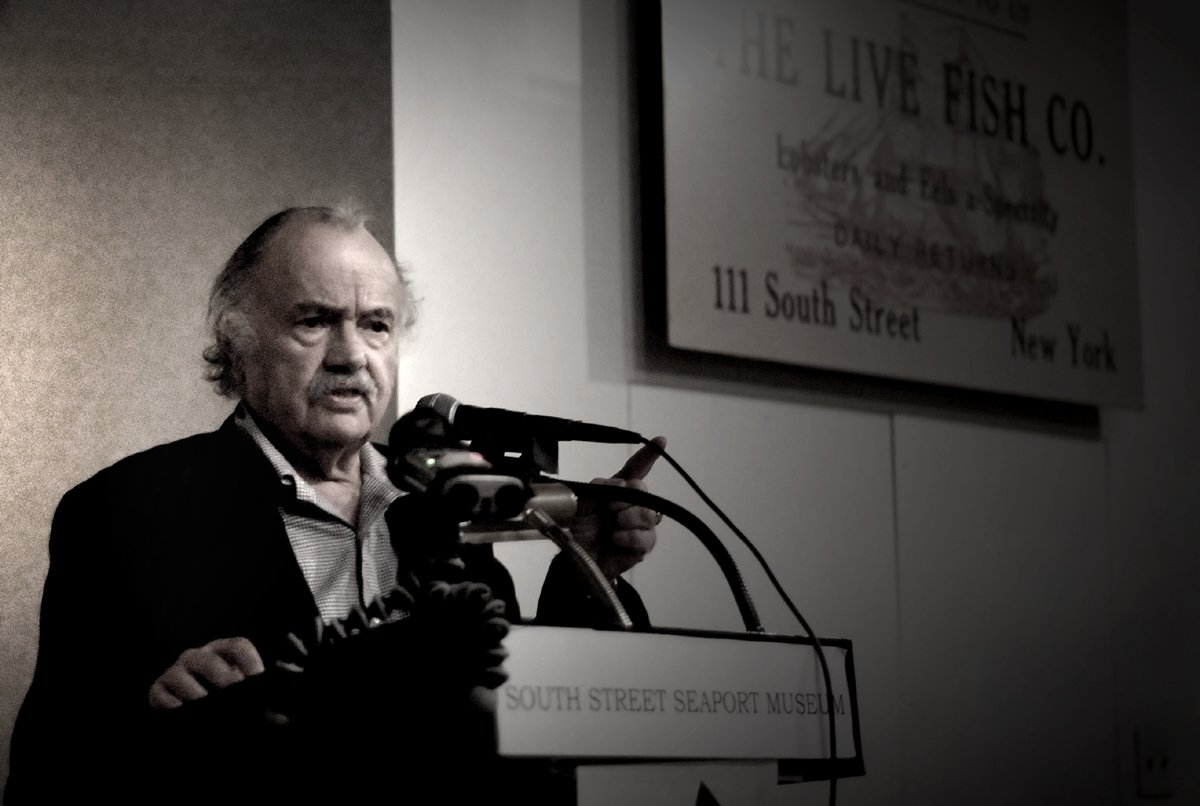
- Goulart in 2009 at the South Street Seaport
- Born: Ronald Joseph Goulart; January 13, 1933; Berkeley, California, U.S.
- Died: January 14, 2022 (aged 89); Ridgefield, Connecticut, U.S.
- Education: University of California, Berkeley
- Occupations: Writer, historian
- Writing career
- Pen name: Chad Calhoun, R. T. Edwards, Ian R. Jamieson, Josephine Kains, Jillian Kearny, Howard Lee, Zeke Masters, Frank S. Shawn, Joseph Silva
- Genres: Mystery, fantasy, science fiction

Ronald Joseph Goulart (/ˈɡuːlɑːrt/; January 13, 1933 – January 14, 2022) was an American popular culture historian and mystery, fantasy and science fiction author.

He worked on novels and novelizations (and other works) being published under various pseudonyms such as: Kenneth Robeson, Con Steffanson, Chad Calhoun, R. T. Edwards, Ian R. Jamieson, Josephine Kains, Jillian Kearny, Howard Lee, Zeke Masters, Frank S. Shawn, and Joseph Silva.

== Life and career ==
Goulart was born in Berkeley, California, on January 13, 1933. He attended the University of California, Berkeley, and worked there as an advertising copywriter in San Francisco while he started to write fiction.

Goulart's first professional publication was a 1952 reprint of the science fiction story "Letters to the Editor" in The Magazine of Fantasy & Science Fiction; this parody of a pulp magazine letters column was originally published in the University of California, Berkeley's Pelican. His early career in advertising and marketing, influenced most of his work. In the early 1960s, Goulart wrote the text for Chex Press, a newspaper parody published on Ralston Purina cereal boxes (Wheat Chex, Rice Chex, Corn Chex). He then wrote dozens of novels and countless short stories spanning many genres, using a variety of pennames He contributed to P.S. and other magazines, along with his book review column for Venture Science Fiction Magazine. Cheap Thrills: An Informal History of the Pulp Magazines (1972) is his best known non-fiction book.

=== Fiction ===
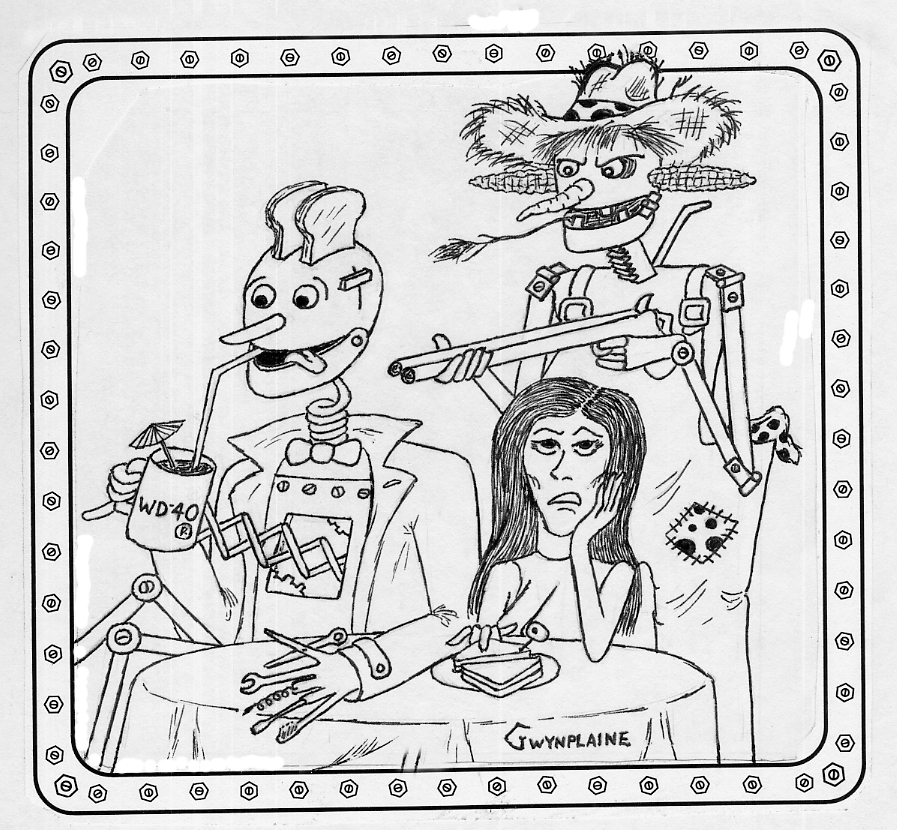
F. Gwynplaine MacIntyre illustrated Ron Goulart's story "The Robot Who Came to Dinner" in Analog (July–August 2002).

Goulart's fiction is characterized by several themes, including technology gone wrong (usually through incompetence rather than malice) and protagonists with superhuman powers. The characteristic style of his work is satire and anarchic humor. His crime and science fiction works include tales about robots and historical Hollywood figures, such as Groucho Marx. In the 1970s, he wrote several novels based on Lee Falk's The Phantom for Avon Books, using the pseudonym "Frank Shawn" (a play on his wife and son's names). He has also written comic book stories and short stories about The Phantom for Moonstone Books from 2003 to the present. As a commercial freelance writer, Goulart has written novelizations for television programs such as Laverne & Shirley, as well as romance novels using female pseudonyms.

It is widely known that Goulart ghost wrote the TekWar series of books credited to the actor William Shatner (Shatner is said to have written the outlines for the books). He has also ghosted novels featuring the Phantom, Flash Gordon and the pulp character The Avenger.

A collection of his mystery short stories, Adam and Eve on a Raft, was published in 2001 by Crippen & Landru.

=== Comics ===
In the early 1970s, Goulart wrote several scripts for Marvel Comics, mostly adaptations of classic science fiction stories. Later in the decade, he collaborated with artist Gil Kane on the Star Hawks newspaper strip. In the early 1990s, he scripted Marvel's TekWar comics series.

=== Personal life ===
Goulart was married to author Frances Sheridan Goulart and has two sons, Sean-Lucien and Steffan Eamon. He died from respiratory arrest at a nursing home in Ridgefield, Connecticut, on January 14, 2022, one day after his 89th birthday.

== Awards ==
Goulart was nominated twice for the Edgar Award, once for his 1970 science fiction novel After Things Fell Apart. He was awarded the Inkpot Award in 1989.

== Bibliography ==
=== Non-fiction ===
- The Hardboiled Dicks: An Anthology and Study of Pulp Detective Fiction (1967)
- Assault on Childhood (1970)
- Cheap Thrills: An Informal History of the Pulp Magazines (1972)
- The Adventurous Decade: Comic Strips In the Thirties (Crown Publishers, 1975) ISBN 9780870002526
- Comic Book Culture: An Illustrated History (1980)
- The Dime Detectives (1982)
- The Great Comic Book Artists (St. Martin's Press, 1986) ISBN 978-0312345570
- Focus on Jack Cole (1986)
- Ron Goulart's Great History of Comic Books: the Definitive Illustrated History from the 1890s to the 1980s (Contemporary Books, 1986) ISBN 978-0809250455
- (editor) The Encyclopedia of American Comics: From 1897 to the Present (Facts on File, 1991) ISBN 978-0816018529
- The Comic Book Reader's Companion: an A-Z Guide to Everyone's Favorite Art Form (Harper Perennial, 1993) ISBN 9780062731173
- Masked Marvels and Jungle Queens: Great Comic Book Covers of the '40s (1993)
- The Funnies: 100 Years of American Comic Strips (Adams Media Corp, 1995) ISBN 9781558505391
- Comic Book Encyclopedia: The Ultimate Guide to Characters, Graphic Novels, Writers, and Artists in the Comic Book Universe (HarperCollins, 2004) ISBN 978-0060538163
- Good Girl Art (2006)
- Good Girl Art Around the World (2008)
- Alex Raymond: An Artistic Journey: Adventure, Intrigue, and Romance (2016)

=== Non-series novels ===
- Ghost Breaker (1971)
- Wildsmith (1972)
- The Tin Angel (1973)
- The Tremendous Adventures of Bernie Wine (1975)
- The Hellhound Project (1975)
- When the Waker Sleeps (1975)
- Cleopatra Jones and the Casino of Gold (1975)
- The Enormous Hourglass (1976)
- The Emperor of the Last Days (1977)
- Nemo (1977)
- Challengers of the Unknown (1977)
- The Island of Dr Moreau (1977) (writing as Joseph Silva)
- Capricorn One (1978) (US version)
- Cowboy Heaven (1979)
- Holocaust for Hire (1979) (writing as Joseph Silva)
- Skyrocket Steele (1980)
- The Robot in the Closet (1981)
- Upside Downside (1982)
- The Great British Detective (1982)
- Ghosting (1982)
- Hellquad (1984)
- Suicide, Inc. (1985)
- A Graveyard of My Own (1985)
- The Tijuana Bible (1989)
- Even the Butler Was Poor (1990)
- Now He Thinks He's Dead (1992)
- Murder on the Aisle (1996)

=== Novel series ===
Flash Gordon (Alex Raymond's original story)

- The Lion Men of Mongo (1974)('adapted by' Con Steffanson)
- The Space Circus (1974)('adapted by' Con Steffanson)
- The Plague of Sound (1974)('adapted by' Con Steffanson)
- The Time Trap of Ming XIII (1974)('adapted by' Con Steffanson)
- The Witch Queen of Mongo (1974)('adapted by' Carson Bingham)
- The War of the Cybernauts (1975)('adapted by' Carson Bingham)

The Phantom (writing as Frank S Shawn)

- The Golden Circle (1973)
- The Hydra Monster (1973)
- The Mystery of the Sea Horse (1973)
- The Veiled Lady (1973)
- The Swamp Rats (1974)
- The Goggle-Eyed Pirates (1974)

Vampirella

- Bloodstalk (1975)
- On Alien Wings (1975)
- Deadwalk (1976)
- Blood Wedding (1976)
- Deathgame (1976)
- Snakegod (1976)
- Vampirella (1976)

Avenger

- The Man from Atlantis (1974) (as Kenneth Robeson)
- Red Moon (1974) (as Kenneth Robeson)
- The Purple Zombie (1974) (as Kenneth Robeson)
- Dr. Time (1974) (as Kenneth Robeson)
- The Nightwitch Devil (1974) (as Kenneth Robeson)
- Black Chariots (1974) (as Kenneth Robeson)
- The Cartoon Crimes (1974) (as Kenneth Robeson)
- The Death Machine (1975) (as Kenneth Robeson)
- The Blood Countess (1975) (as Kenneth Robeson)
- The Glass Man (1975) (as Kenneth Robeson)
- The Iron Skull (1975) (as Kenneth Robeson)
- Demon Island (1975) (as Kenneth Robeson)

Barnum System

- The Fire-Eater (1970)
- Clockwork Pirates (1971)
- Shaggy Planet (1973)
- Spacehawk, Inc. (1974)
- The Wicked Cyborg (1978)
- Dr. Scofflaw (1979)

Barnum System – Jack Summer

- Death Cell (1971)
- Plunder (1972)
- A Whiff of Madness (1976)
- Galaxy Jane (1986)

Barnum System – Ben Jolson

- The Sword Swallower (1968)
- Flux (1974)

Barnum System – Star Hawks

- Empire 99 (1980)
- The Cyborg King (1981)

Barnum System – The Exchameleon

- Daredevils, LTD. (1987)
- Starpirate's Brain (1987)
- Everybody Comes to Cosmo's (1988)

Jack Conger

- A Talent for the Invisible (1973)
- The Panchronicon Plot (1977)
- Hello, Lemuria, Hello (1979)

Odd Jobs, Inc.

- Calling Dr. Patchwork (1978)
- Hail Hibbler (1980)
- Big Bang (1982)
- Brainz, Inc. (1985)

Fragmented America

- After Things Fell Apart (1970)
- Gadget Man (1971)
- Hawkshaw (1972)
- When the Waker Sleeps (1975)
- Crackpot (1977)
- Brinkman (1981)

Gypsy

- Quest of the Gypsy (1976)
- Eye of the Vulture (1977)

Marvel Novel Series (as Joseph Silva; with Len Wein and Marv Wolfman)

- Incredible Hulk: Stalker from the Stars (1977)
- Captain America: Holocaust for Hire (1979)

Harry Challenge

- The Prisoner of Blackwood Castle (1984)
- The Curse of the Obelisk (1987)

Groucho Marx

- Groucho Marx, Master Detective (1998)
- Groucho Marx, Private Eye (1999)
- Elementary, My Dear Groucho (1999)
- Groucho Marx and the Broadway Murders (2001)
- Groucho Marx, Secret Agent (2002)
- Groucho Marx, King of the Jungle (2005)

=== Short fiction ===
Collections

- Broke Down Engine: And Other Troubles with Machines (1971)
- The Chameleon Corps: And Other Shape Changers (1972)
- What's Become of Screwloose?: And Other Inquiries (1972)
- Odd Job 101: And Other Future Crimes And Intrigues (1974)
- Nutzenbolts: And More Troubles with Machines (1975)
- Skyrocket Steele Conquers the Universe: And Other Media Tales (1990)
- Adam and Eve On a Raft: Mystery Stories (Crippen & Landru, 2001)

Stories

- "Ella Speed", Fantastic, April 1960
- "Subject to Change" Galaxy Science Fiction, October 1960
- Harry Challenge Series
  - The Secret of the Black Chateau – Espionage Magazine, February 1985
  - Monster of the Maze – Espionage Magazine, February 1986
  - The Phantom Highwayman – The Ultimate Halloween, edited by Marvin Kaye (2001)
  - The Woman in the Mist – The Magazine of Fantasy & Science Fiction, December, 2002
  - The Incredible Steam Man – The Magazine of Fantasy & Science Fiction, May, 2003
  - The Secret of the Scarab – The Magazine of Fantasy & Science Fiction, April, 2005
  - The Problem of the Missing Werewolf – H. P. Lovecraft's Magazine of Horror #4, (Spring / Summer 2007)
  - The Mystery of the Missing Automaton – Sherlock Holmes Mystery Magazine #1, (Winter 2008)
  - The Mystery of the Flying Man – Sherlock Holmes Mystery Magazine #2, (Spring 2009)
  - The Secret of the City of Gold – The Magazine of Fantasy & Science Fiction, January / February 2012
  - The Somerset Wonder –

Title	Year	First published	Reprinted/collected	Notes
Black magic for dummies	2000	Goulart, Ron (May 2000). "Black magic for dummies". F&SF. 98 (5): 4–24.		
The Katy dialogues	1958	Goulart, Ron (July 1958). "The Katy dialogues". F&SF. 15 (1).		
