= Sturgeon's law =

Adage stating that "ninety percent of everything is crap"

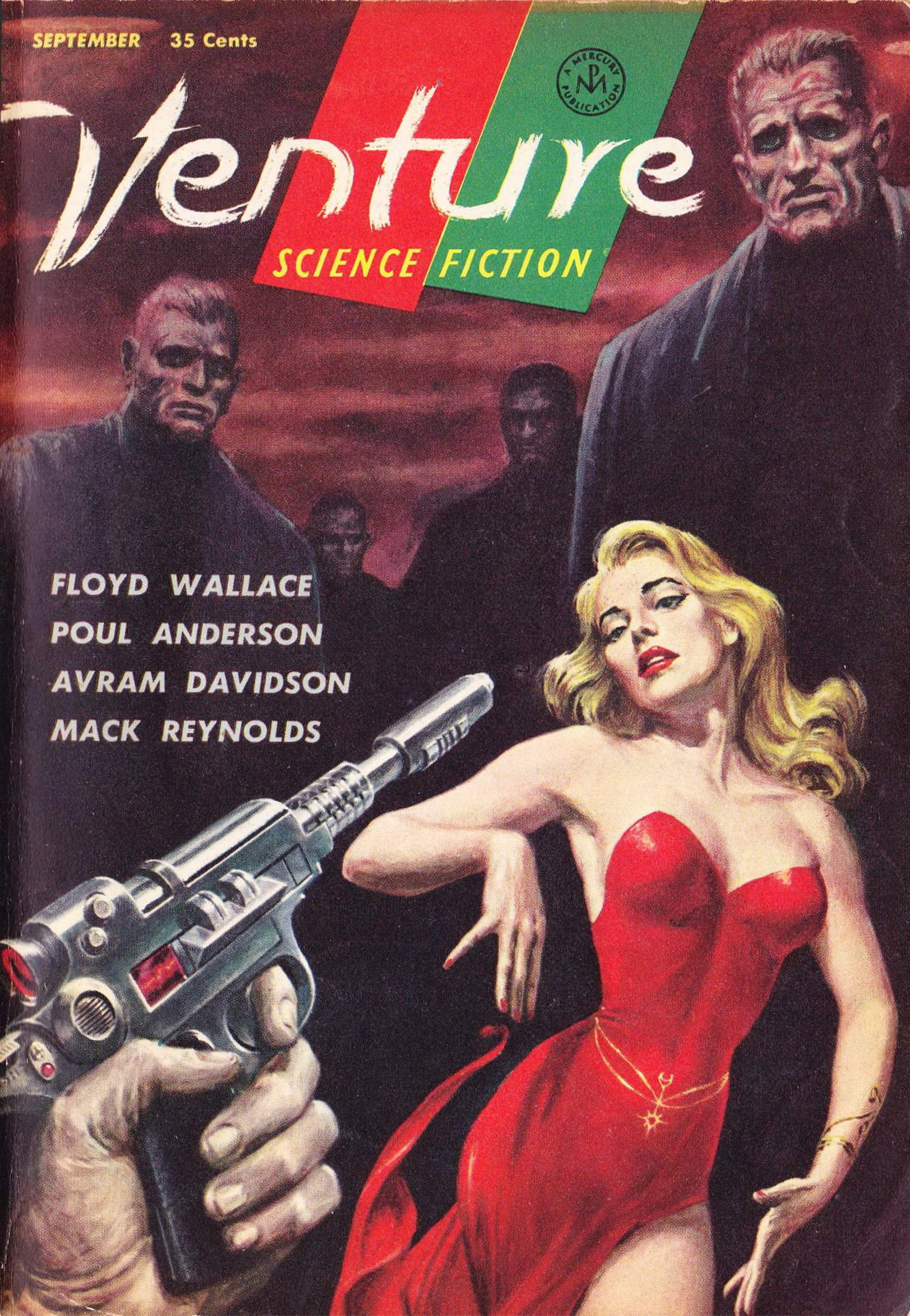
The cover of the September 1957 issue of Venture Science Fiction where Sturgeon first wrote, "ninety-percent of everything is crud."

Sturgeon's law states, "Ninety percent of everything is crap". The adage was coined by American science fiction author and critic Theodore Sturgeon while defending the merits of the genre. Sturgeon observed that most works in any field were low quality. Therefore, science fiction was not uniquely inferior.

== History ==
Theodore Sturgeon first posited a version of his law during a 1951 or 1952 lecture at New York University attended by William Tenn. On Labor Day weekend in 1953, Sturgeon repeated the concept during a talk at the World Science Fiction Convention in Philadelphia. James E. Gunn attended the event and recalled Sturgeon's remarks decades later in The New York Review of Science Fiction:

"When people talk about the mystery novel...they mention The Maltese Falcon and The Big Sleep. When they talk about the western, they say there's The Way West and Shane. But when they talk about science fiction, they call it 'that Buck Rogers stuff,' and they say 'ninety percent of science fiction is crud.' Well, they're right. Ninety percent of science fiction is crud. But then ninety percent of everything is crud, and it's the ten percent that isn't crud that is important. and the ten percent of science fiction that isn't crud is as good as or better than anything being written anywhere."

In the September 1957 issue of Venture Science Fiction, Sturgeon first wrote about the law in his book column. He drafted it as a preamble to a positive review of Philip K. Dick's 1955 novel Eye in the Sky. Sturgeon bemoaned his twenty-year defense of science fiction against "lay critics" who argue that the genre is "ninety-percent crud":

"And on that hangs Sturgeon's revelation. It came to him that s f is indeed ninety-percent crud, but that also – Eureka! – ninety-percent of everything is crud. All things – cars, books, cheeses, hairstyles, people, and pins are, to the expert and discerning eye, crud, except for the acceptable tithe which we each happen to like."

In the March 1958 issue of Venture, Sturgeon abandoned his usual book review in order to request story submissions for a science fiction anthology that he would edit. He pleaded, "Let us make a book, you and I, to refute for all time, and for all of Time, the great permeating assumption that this field cannot produce work of lasting artistic and literary merit." As he rehearsed the common critiques of the genre, Sturgeon expanded upon his revelation with two corollaries:

"...I repeat Sturgeon's Revelation, which was wrung out of me after twenty years of wearying defense of science fiction against attacks of people who used the worst examples of the field for ammunition, and whose conclusion was that ninety percent of s f is crud.

The Revelation:

Ninety percent of everything is crud.

Corollary 1: The existence of immense quantities of trash in science fiction is admitted and it is regrettable; but it is no more unnatural than the existence of trash anywhere.

Corollary 2: The best science fiction is as good as the best fiction in any field."

In his July 1957 book column, Sturgeon actually formulated a different law. He claimed to have "reduced the cosmos to Sturgeon's Law: Nothing Is Always Absolutely So". This adage previously appeared as a mantra that inspired scientific inquiry in his story "The Claustrophile" (Galaxy, August 1956).

By 1974, Sturgeon acknowledged that his revelation had become known as "Sturgeon's Law". In an essay for a Reginald Bretnor anthology, Sturgeon wrote about science fiction magazines and their contributors:

"The assumption is that the magazines themselves, and therefore all of their authors' products, are trash and junk, poorly conceived and poorly written, and concern bolts, nuts, nuclei, zap-guns, and bug-eyed monsters; and anyway, ninety percent of it in concept and execution is trash.
"Conceded, but then (and this has come to be known as Sturgeon's Law) ninety percent of everything is trash. The best of science fiction is as good as the best of any modern literature—articulate, poetic, philosophical, provocative, searching, courageous, insightful, and virtually anything else you expect of the best. Science fiction alone among the labels is consistently tarred with its own bad examples; the very same reader who knows the difference between Hopalong Cassidy and Shane, or between Mickey Spillane and Graham Greene, utterly fails to discriminate between the good and the bad in science fiction; utterly fails even to try, and says (in the words of Kingsley Amis), 'This is science fiction—it can't be good,' or, 'This is good—it can't be science fiction'!"

== Text ==
Sturgeon's written formulations of the law use the word "crud" and "trash". The most common iteration of Sturgeon's Law holds that "90 per cent of everything is crap". The aphorism has been catalogued by the Oxford English Dictionary.

== Precedents and proponents ==
In Benjamin Disraeli's 1870 novel Lothair, Mr. Phoebus opines:

"Nine-tenths of existing books are nonsense, and the clever books are the refutation of that nonsense."

A similar adage appears in Rudyard Kipling's 1891 novel The Light That Failed, when Dick is discussing painting with Maisie:

"Four-fifths of everybody's work must be bad. But the remnant is worth the trouble for its own sake."

In his 1946 essay "Confessions of a Book Reviewer", George Orwell reveals:

"In much more than nine cases out of ten the only objectively truthful criticism would be 'This book is worthless'..."

PC World applied Sturgeon's law to the internet in 1996.

Philosopher Daniel Dennett has repeatedly cited Sturgeon's law. In a 2004 review of a John Dupré book, Dennett invoked James Gunn's formulation of the law. Dennett expounded on Sturgeon's law in a 2013 book and championed it as a critical thinking tool:

"Ninety percent of everything is crap. Ninety percent of experiments in molecular biology, 90 percent of poetry, 90 percent of philosophy books, 90 percent of peer-reviewed articles in mathematics—and so forth—is crap. Is that true? Well, maybe it's an exaggeration, but let's agree that there is a lot of mediocre work done in every field...A good moral to draw from this observation is that when you want to criticize a field, a genre, a discipline, an art form,...don't waste your time and ours hooting at the crap! Go after the good stuff, or leave it alone."

Edward M. Lerner joked in 2006,

"Sturgeon's law posits that ninety percent of everything is crap. Either Sturgeon was a cockeyed optimist, or he knew nothing about software."

In 2026, Mac Barnett invoked Sturgeon's law in his book Make Believe: On Telling Stories to Children and proposed an addendum:

"So I now offer Barnett’s Addendum to Sturgeon's Law: Maybe more like 94.7 percent of kids' books are crud."

== See also ==
- Hanlon's razor
- List of eponymous laws
- Not even wrong
- Pareto distribution
- Pareto principle
