= The Prisoner of Blackwood Castle =

1984 steampunk novel by Ron Goulart

- Author: Ron Goulart
- Series: Harry Challenge
- Genre: Steampunk
- Publisher: Avon Books
- Publication date: 1984
- ISBN: 978-0380880058
- Followed by: The Curse of the Obelisk

The Prisoner of Blackwood Castle is a lighthearted Victorian supernatural steampunk novel written by Ron Goulart and published in 1984 by Avon Books that features the detective adventurer Harry Challenge.

== Plot summary ==
Harry Challenge, who works for his father's Challenge International Detective Agency, has gone to Zevenburg, the capital of the small Balkan nation of Orlandia, to call upon the Crown Princess Alicia, with whom he had a brief romance the year before. However, after showing his card at the palace door, Challenge is unceremoniously thrown out. Challenge puts it down to the fact that her father the king is critically ill, but later he receives a note from the princess inviting him to meet her at the Pavilion of Automatons that evening. When Harry goes, he is attacked by a rapier-wielding automaton and only just defeats it. Before Challenge has a chance to investigate who was behind the attack, he is hired by an American couple who are convinced that a charlatan posing as psychologist is holding their uncle in a "sanitarium" in the Blackwood Forest.

With the aid of the prescient stage magician the Great Lorenzo and the reporter Jennie Barr, Challenge survives werewolf and automaton attacks, and uncovers a plot to replace the crown princess —now the queen — with an automaton.

== Publication history ==
Ron Goulart, like his contemporary, Keith Laumer, wrote lighthearted science fiction in the 1970s and 80s. Goulart sometimes broke away from the science fiction genre, one occasion being his supernatural Victorian steampunk novel The Prisoner of Blackwood Castle, published as a 184-page paperback by Avon Books in July 1984. Goulart wrote one other Harry Challenge novel, The Curse of the Obelisk in 1987.

== Reception ==
In Issue 30 of Abyss (Summer 1984), Dave Nalle noted that the book "retains the traditional Goulart flavor of mayhem and mechanical men. Like most of Goulart's recent work, this is a short and silly novel, but it is a bit more interesting than his endless stream of slapstick science fiction, and makes for light and diverting reading for a couple of hours." Nalle felt that "Goulart has a lively writing style and has a facility with stock character types and twisted plots.... He tends to stuff too much into a novel and slip by details and ideas I'd like to see explored, but for once, in this novel I was left wanting more, rather than being glad it was over." Nalle concluded, "if you aren't looking for deep meaning or heights of literary excellence, The Prisoner of Blackwood Castle is fun, light reading."

In the January 1985 edition of Amazing Stories, Robert Coulson called this "Something to try when you want really light reading. It will probably be more appreciated by readers (like me) who have encountered The Prisoner of Zenda, The Mad King, and/or George Barr McCutcheon's innumerable books about Graustark." Coulson concluded, "it's typical Goulart and an enjoyable lightweight parody."
