= The Magazine of Fantasy & Science Fiction =

American magazine

- An early issue, with an astronomical cover painting by Chesley Bonestell
- Editor: Sheree Renée Thomas
- Categories: Fantasy and science fiction
- Frequency: Bimonthly
- Founder: Anthony Boucher; J. Francis McComas; Lawrence Spivak
- Founded: 1949
- Company: Spilogale, Inc.
- Country: United States
- Based in: Hoboken, New Jersey
- Language: English
- Website: fandsf.com
- ISSN: 0024-984X

The Magazine of Fantasy & Science Fiction (usually referred to as F&SF) is a U.S. fantasy and science fiction magazine, first published in 1949 by Mystery House, a subsidiary of Lawrence Spivak's Mercury Press. Editors Anthony Boucher and J. Francis McComas had approached Spivak in the mid-1940s about creating a fantasy companion to Spivak's existing mystery title, Ellery Queen's Mystery Magazine. The first issue was titled The Magazine of Fantasy, but the decision was quickly made to include science fiction as well as fantasy, and the title was changed correspondingly with the second issue. F&SF was quite different in presentation from the existing science fiction magazines of the day, most of which were in pulp format: it had no interior illustrations, no letter column, and text in a single-column format, which in the opinion of science fiction historian Mike Ashley "set F&SF apart, giving it the air and authority of a superior magazine".

F&SF quickly became one of the leading magazines in the science fiction and fantasy fields, with a reputation for publishing literary material and including more diverse stories than its competitors. Well-known stories that appeared in its early years include Richard Matheson's "Born of Man and Woman" and Ward Moore's Bring the Jubilee, a novel of an alternative history in which the South has won the American Civil War. McComas left for health reasons in 1954, but Boucher continued as sole editor until 1958, winning the Hugo Award for Best Magazine that year, a feat his successor, Robert Mills, repeated in the next two years. Mills was responsible for publishing Flowers for Algernon by Daniel Keyes, Rogue Moon by Algis Budrys, Starship Troopers by Robert Heinlein, and the first of Brian Aldiss's Hothouse stories. The first few issues mostly featured cover art by George Salter, Mercury Press's art director, but other artists soon began to appear, including Chesley Bonestell, Kelly Freas and Ed Emshwiller.

In 1962, Mills was succeeded as editor by Avram Davidson. When Davidson left at the end of 1964, Joseph Ferman, who had bought the magazine from Spivak in 1954, took over briefly as editor, though his son Edward soon began doing the editorial work under his father's supervision. At the start of 1966, Edward Ferman was listed as editor, and four years later, he acquired the magazine from his father and moved the editorial offices to his house in Connecticut. Ferman remained editor for over 25 years, and published many well-received stories, including Fritz Leiber's "Ill Met in Lankhmar", Robert Silverberg's "Born with the Dead", and Stephen King's The Dark Tower series. In 1991, he turned the editorship over to Kristine Kathryn Rusch, who began including more horror and dark fantasy than had appeared under Ferman. In the mid-1990s, circulation began to decline; most American magazines were losing subscribers and F&SF was no exception. Gordon Van Gelder replaced Rusch in 1997, and bought the magazine from Ferman in 2001, but circulation continued to fall, and by 2011 it was below 15,000. Charles Coleman Finlay took over from Van Gelder as editor in 2015. Sheree Renée Thomas succeeded Charles Coleman Finlay, becoming the magazine's 10th editor in the fall of 2020.

The Magazine of Fantasy & Science Fiction was purchased in February 2025, along with Asimov's Science Fiction and Analog Science Fiction and Fact, by Must Read Books Publishing.

== Publication history ==
Issue data for 1949 to 2024
	Winter			Spring			Summer			Fall		
	Jan	Feb	Mar	Apr	May	Jun	Jul	Aug	Sep	Oct	Nov	Dec
1949										1/1		
1950			1/2				1/3			1/4		1/5
1951		2/1		2/2		2/3		2/4		2/5		2/6
1952		3/1		3/2		3/3		3/4	3/5	3/6	3/7	3/8
1953	4/1	4/2	4/3	4/4	4/5	4/6	5/1	5/2	5/3	5/4	5/5	5/6
1954	6/1	6/2	6/3	6/4	6/5	6/6	7/1	7/2	7/3	7/4	7/5	7/6
1955	8/1	8/2	8/3	8/4	8/5	8/6	9/1	9/2	9/3	9/4	9/5	9/6
1956	10/1	10/2	10/3	10/4	10/5	10/6	11/1	11/2	11/3	11/4	11/5	11/6
1957	12/1	12/2	12/3	12/4	12/5	12/6	13/1	13/2	13/3	13/4	13/5	13/6
1958	13/7	14/2	14/3	14/4	14/5	14/6	15/1	15/2	15/3	15/4	15/5	15/6
1959	16/1	16/2	16/3	16/4	16/5	16/6	17/1	17/2	17/3	17/4	17/5	17/6
1960	18/1	18/2	18/3	18/4	18/5	18/6	18/7	19/2	19/3	19/4	19/5	19/6
1961	20/1	20/2	20/3	20/4	20/5	20/6	21/1	21/2	21/3	21/4	21/5	21/6
1962	22/1	22/2	22/3	22/4	22/5	22/6	23/1	23/2	23/3	23/4	23/5	23/6
1963	24/1	24/2	24/3	24/4	24/5	24/6	25/1	25/2	25/3	25/4	25/5	25/6
1964	26/1	26/2	26/3	26/4	26/5	26/6	27/1	27/2	27/3	27/4	27/5	27/6
1965	28/1	28/2	28/3	28/4	28/5	28/6	29/1	29/2	29/3	29/4	29/5	29/6
1966	30/1	30/2	30/3	30/4	30/5	30/6	31/1	31/2	31/3	31/4	31/5	31/6
1967	32/1	32/2	32/3	32/4	32/5	32/6	33/1	33/2	33/3	33/4	33/5	33/6
1968	34/1	34/2	34/3	34/4	34/5	34/6	35/1	35/2	35/3	35/4	35/5	35/6
1969	36/1	36/2	36/3	36/4	36/5	36/6	37/1	37/2	37/3	37/4	37/5	37/6
1970	38/1	38/2	38/3	38/4	38/5	38/6	39/1	39/2	39/3	39/4	39/5	39/6
1971	40/1	40/2	40/3	40/4	40/5	40/6	41/1	41/2	41/3	41/4	41/5	41/6
1972	42/1	42/2	42/3	42/4	42/5	42/6	43/1	43/2	43/3	43/4	43/5	43/6
1973	44/1	44/2	44/3	44/4	44/5	44/6	45/1	45/2	45/3	45/4	45/5	45/6
1974	46/1	46/2	46/3	46/4	46/5	46/6	47/1	47/2	47/3	47/4	47/5	47/6
1975	48/1	48/2	48/3	48/4	48/5	48/6	49/1	49/2	49/3	49/4	49/5	49/6
1976	50/1	50/2	50/3	50/4	50/5	50/6	51/1	51/2	51/3	51/4	51/5	51/6
1977	52/1	52/2	52/3	52/4	52/5	52/6	53/1	53/2	53/3	53/4	53/5	53/6
1978	54/1	54/2	54/3	54/4	54/5	54/6	55/1	55/2	55/3	55/4	55/5	55/6
1979	56/1	56/2	56/3	56/4	56/5	56/6	57/1	57/2	57/3	57/4	57/5	57/6
1980	58/1	58/2	58/3	58/4	58/5	58/6	59/1	59/2	59/3	59/4	59/5	59/6
1981	60/1	60/2	60/3	60/4	60/5	60/6	61/1	61/2	61/3	61/4	61/5	61/6
1982	62/1	62/2	62/3	62/4	62/5	62/6	63/1	63/2	63/3	63/4	63/5	63/6
1983	64/1	64/2	64/3	64/4	64/5	64/6	65/1	65/2	65/3	65/4	65/5	65/6
1984	66/1	66/2	66/3	66/4	66/5	66/6	67/1	67/2	67/3	67/4	67/5	67/6
1985	68/1	68/2	68/3	68/4	68/5	68/6	69/1	69/2	69/3	69/4	69/5	69/6
1986	70/1	70/2	70/3	70/4	70/5	70/6	71/1	71/2	71/3	71/4	71/5	71/6
1987	72/1	72/2	72/3	72/4	72/5	72/6	73/1	73/2	73/3	73/4	73/5	73/6
1988	74/1	74/2	74/3	74/4	74/5	74/6	75/1	75/2	75/3	75/4	75/5	75/6
1989	76/1	76/2	76/3	76/4	76/5	76/6	77/1	77/2	77/3	77/4	77/5	77/6
1990	78/1	78/2	78/3	78/4	78/5	78/6	79/1	79/2	79/3	79/4	79/5	79/6
1991	80/1	80/2	80/3	80/4	80/5	80/6	81/1	81/2	81/3	81/4 & 5		81/6
1992	82/1	82/2	82/3	82/4	82/5	82/6	83/1	83/2	83/3	83/4 & 5		83/6
1993	84/1	84/2	84/3	84/4	84/5	84/6	85/1	85/2	85/3	85/4&5		85/6
1994	86/1	86/2	86/3	86/4	86/5	86/6	87/1	87/2	87/3	87/4&5		87/6
1995	88/1	88/2	88/3	88/4	88/5	88/6	89/1	89/2	89/3	89/4&5		89/6
1996	90/1	90/2	90/3	90/4	90/5	90/6	91/1	91/2	91/3	91/4&5		91/6
1997	92/1	92/2	92/3	92/4	92/5	92/6	93/1	93/2	93/3	93/4&5		93/6
1998	94/1	94/2	94/3	94/4	94/5	94/6	95/1	95/2	95/3	95/4&5		95/6
1999	96/1	96/2	96/3	96/4	96/5	96/6	97/1	97/2	97/3	97/4&5		97/6
2000	98/1	98/2	98/3	98/4	98/5	98/6	99/1	99/2	99/3	99/4&5		99/6
2001	100/1	100/2	100/3	100/4	100/5	100/6	101/1	101/2	101/3	101/4&5		101/6
2002	102/1	102/2	102/3	102/4	102/5	102/6	103/1	103/2	103/3	103/4&5		103/6
2003	104/1	104/2	104/3	104/4	104/5	104/6	105/1	105/2	105/3	105/4&5		105/6
2004	106/1	106/2	106/3	106/4	106/5	106/6	107/1	107/2	107/3	107/4&5		107/6
2005	108/1	108/2	108/3	108/4	108/5	108/6	109/1	109/2	109/3	109/4&5		109/6
2006	110/1	110/2	110/3	110/4	110/5	110/6	111/1	111/2	111/3	111/4&5		111/6
2007	112/1	112/2	112/3	112/4	112/5	112/6	113/1	113/2	113/3	113/4&5		113/6
2008	114/1	114/2	114/3	114/4	114/5	114/6	115/1	115/2	115/3	115/4&5		115/6
2009	116/1	116/2	116/3	116/4&5		116/6&7		117/1&2		117/3&4		117/5
2010	118/1&2		118/3&4		118/5&6		119/1&2		119/3&4		119/5&6	
2011	120/1&2		120/3&4		120/5&6		121/1&2		121/3&4		121/5&6	
2012	122/1&2		122/3&4		122/5&6		123/1&2		123/3&4		123/5&6	
2013	124/1&2		124/3&4		124/5&6		125/1&2		125/3&4		125/5&6	
2014	126/1&2		126/3&4		126/5&6		127/1&2		127/3&4		127/5&6	
2015	128/1&2		128/3&4		128/5&6		129/1&2		129/3&4		129/5&6	
2016	130/1&2		130/3&4		130/5&6		131/1&2		131/3&4		131/5&6	
2017	132/1&2		132/3&4		132/5&6		133/1&2		133/3&4		133/5&6	
2018	134/1&2		134/3&4		134/5&6		135/1&2		135/3&4		135/5&6	
2019	136/1&2		136/3&4		136/5&6		137/1&2		137/3&4		137/5&6	
2020	138/1&2		138/3&4		138/5&6		139/1&2		139/3&4		139/5&6	
2021	140/1&2		140/3&4		140/5&6		141/1&2		141/3&4		141/4&6	
2022	142/1&2		142/3&4		142/5&6		143/1&2		143/3&4		143/4&6	
2023	144/1&2		144/3&4		144/5&6		145/1&2		145/3&4		145/4&6	
2024	146/1&2						146/3&4					
Issues of The Magazine of Fantasy & Science Fiction from 1949 to 2024, showing volume and issue number. The apparent errors in numbering in January 1958 and July 1960 are given correctly. Underlining indicates an issue was titled as a quarterly (e.g. "Fall 1949") rather a monthly. The colours indicate the editor: Anthony Boucher and J. Francis McComas Anthony Boucher Robert Mills Avram Davidson Joseph Ferman Edward Ferman Kristine Kathryn Rusch Gordon van Gelder Charles Coleman Finlay Sheree Thomas

=== Lawrence Spivak ===
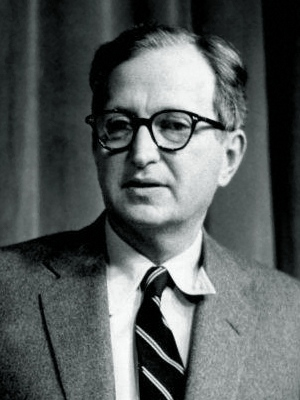
Lawrence Spivak in 1960

The first magazine dedicated to fantasy, Weird Tales, appeared in 1923; it was followed in 1926 by Amazing Stories, the first science fiction (sf) magazine. By the end of the 1930s, the genre was flourishing in the United States, nearly twenty new sf and fantasy titles appearing between 1938 and 1941. These were all pulp magazines, which meant that despite the occasional high-quality story, most of the magazines presented badly written fiction and were regarded as trash by many readers. In 1941, Ellery Queen's Mystery Magazine appeared, edited by Fred Dannay and focusing on detective fiction. The magazine was published in digest format, rather than pulp, and printed a mixture of classic stories and fresh material. Dannay attempted to avoid the sensationalist fiction appearing in the pulps, and soon made the magazine a success.

In the early 1940s Anthony Boucher, a successful writer of fantasy and sf and also of mystery stories, got to know Dannay through his work on the Ellery Queen radio show. Boucher also knew J. Francis McComas, an editor who shared his interest in fantasy and SF. By 1944 McComas and Boucher became interested in the idea of a fantasy companion to Ellery Queen's Mystery Magazine, and spoke to Dannay about it. Dannay was interested in the idea, but paper was scarce because of World War II. The following year Boucher and McComas suggested that the new magazine could use the Ellery Queen name, but Dannay knew little about fantasy and suggested instead that they approach Lawrence Spivak, the owner of Mercury Press, which published Ellery Queen's Mystery Magazine.

In January 1946, Boucher and McComas went to New York and met with Spivak, who let them know later in the year that he wanted to go ahead. At Spivak's request they began acquiring material for the new magazine, including a new story by Raymond Chandler, and reprint rights to stories by H. P. Lovecraft, John Dickson Carr and Robert Bloch. Spivak initially planned the first issue (for which Boucher and McComas were proposing the title Fantasy and Horror) for early 1947, but repeatedly delayed the launch because of poor newsstand sales of digest magazines. He also suggested that it should be priced at 35 cents an issue, which was higher than the original plan, to provide a financial buffer against poor sales. In May 1949 Spivak suggested a new title, The Magazine of Fantasy, and in August a press release announced that the magazine would appear in October. On October 6, 1949, Spivak, Boucher and McComas held a luncheon at the Waldorf-Astoria in New York City to commemorate the 100th anniversary of the death of Edgar Allan Poe and to launch "a new fantasy anthology periodical". Invitees included Carr, Basil Rathbone, and Boris Karloff.

The first issue, published by Fantasy House, a subsidiary of American Mercury, sold 57,000 copies, which was less than Spivak had hoped for, but in November he gave Boucher and McComas the go-ahead for another issue. The title was changed to The Magazine of Fantasy and Science Fiction (almost always abbreviated to F&SF by both fans and science fiction historians) to reflect the contents. Sales of the second issue were strong enough for Spivak to commit further, and the magazine's future became more assured, despite the difficulties caused by the fact that both Boucher and McComas lived on the west coast, whereas the magazine's publishing offices were in New York. The publishing schedule moved to bimonthly with the December 1950 issue. The pay rate for the early issues was two cents per word, or $100 for short pieces, which was competitive with Astounding Science Fiction, the leading sf magazine of the day. By 1953 the rates had changed to three-and-a-half cents per word for stories under 3,000 words.

In 1951, McComas, who had a full-time job in sales on top of his role as editor of F&SF, was forced to reduce his workload for health reasons. (Note: McComas's salary was reduced, and he described his new role as retiring to "a consulting position".) Boucher then did most of the reading and editing, while McComas reviewed the results and occasionally vetoed a story. In August the following year the schedule switched to monthly. In 1954 Spivak sold his shares in Mercury Press to his general manager, Joseph Ferman; that year also saw McComas's departure—his health had deteriorated to the point where he had to give up the editing post completely.

=== The Fermans and Gordon Van Gelder ===
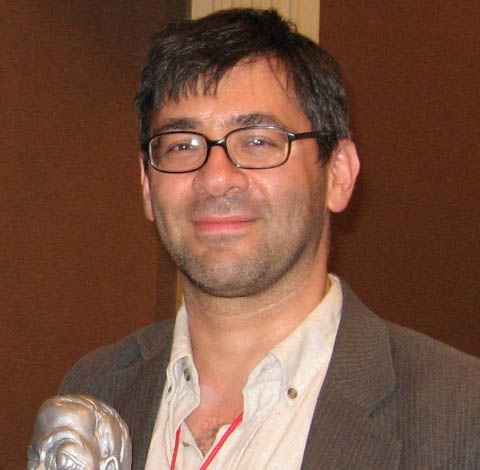
Gordon Van Gelder in 2007

In 1957 Ferman launched a companion magazine, Venture Science Fiction, which was intended to focus on more action-oriented fiction than F&SF. Boucher was unable to take on the extra work, so Robert P. Mills, who had been the managing editor for F&SF, became Venture's editor, with Boucher in an advisory role. Later that year Ferman sold Ellery Queen's Mystery Magazine to Bernard Davis, who was leaving Ziff-Davis to start his own publishing venture. Ferman retained F&SF, though Boucher departed, and Mills became the editor of F&SF while remaining managing editor of Queen's magazine. Mills stayed for over three years, leaving at the end of 1961 to spend more time working as a literary agent, and Ferman replaced him with Avram Davidson, whose name first appeared on the masthead with the April 1962 issue. Joseph Ferman's son Edward had worked for the magazine as an editorial assistant in the 1950s, but left in 1959 to gain experience elsewhere; he returned in 1962, and worked under Davidson as managing editor. In 1963 Ted White, later the editor of Amazing Stories, became assistant editor, and stayed with the magazine until 1968.

Davidson gave up the editor's chair in late 1964 in order to have more time to write, and was initially replaced by Joseph Ferman, who handed over control to his son Edward from May 1965, though the masthead did not reflect the change till 1966. (Note: Isaac Asimov, in his autobiography, says that he was the one to suggest Edward Ferman take over as editor.) Four years later the younger Ferman took over from his father as publisher as well, and moved the editorial and publishing offices to his house in Cornwall, Connecticut. His wife, Audrey, was business manager, and Andrew Porter was an assistant editor. In the early 1970s Ferman contacted Sol Cohen, the owner of Amazing Stories and Fantastic Stories, two competing sf magazines, about purchasing them both. Ferman was considering combining them into a single magazine and publishing them alongside F&SF, but Cohen decided to keep both titles.

In 1969, an issue of F&SF was priced at 50 cents; by the end of the 1970s the price had gone up to $1.25, although the page count also rose, from 128 to 160 pages. Circulation did not suffer, but rose from 50,000 to over 60,000, partly because of subscription drives through Publishers' Clearing House, and perhaps also because the magazine's quality remained consistent throughout the decade. In Ashley's words, "F&SF delivered the goods month after month": the schedule was reliable, the format remained unchanged, and the editor remained the same from 1965 throughout the next two decades and more. Ferman managed to keep the circulation above 50,000, and sometimes above 60,000, during the 1980s. He turned over the editorship to Kristine Kathryn Rusch in 1991, and by the mid-1990s circulation began to fall again. In 1997 Gordon Van Gelder took over as editor, and from the February 2001 issue was publisher as well, having bought the magazine from Ferman. John Joseph Adams was Van Gelder's assistant editor from 2001 until December 2009. Van Gelder was unable to arrest the decline in circulation, which by 2011 was down to less than 15,000. Van Gelder reduced the publication frequency to bimonthly, increasing the page count and price. Charles Coleman Finlay guest-edited the July/August 2014 issue, and was hired in 2015 as full-time editor, beginning with the March/April 2015 issue. Sheree Renée Thomas was hired as editor, beginning with the March/April 2021 issue.

== Contents and reception ==
=== Boucher, McComas, Mills and Davidson ===
Boucher and McComas's original goal for the new magazine was to imitate the formula that had made Ellery Queen's Mystery Magazine successful: classic reprints, along with quality fiction that avoided the excesses of the pulps. The initial proposal called for the magazine to include fantasy, but not science fiction. Even before the launch, the editors found they were having trouble deciding exactly where the boundary lay, so when in February 1949 Joseph Ferman, Spivak's general manager, asked them to add sf to the lineup as a way to broaden the readership, they were happy to comply. The first issue included only one story that could be called science fiction: Theodore Sturgeon's "The Hurkle Is a Happy Beast"; it also included reprints from the slick magazines by writers such as Richard Sale and Guy Endore. The interior layout was quite different from the existing fantasy and sf magazines: there were no interior illustrations, and the text was printed in a single column, instead of two as was usual elsewhere. There was a book review column, but no letters page. According to sf historian Mike Ashley, this "set F&SF apart, giving it the air and authority of a superior magazine". The logo design and layout were the work of Mercury Press's art director, George Salter, whose background was in book design rather than in pulp magazines. Salter remained with the magazine until 1958. He was responsible for many of the surreal early covers; these gave way to work by other artists, but his design for F&SF remained intact for decades, and in Ashley's opinion the consistency of appearance has been "one of the major selling points" of the magazine.

When the second issue appeared, with the title revised to include "Science Fiction", there was no announcement of the change, and not much more science fiction than in the first issue. Damon Knight contributed one example, "Not with a Bang", which Knight has described as his first fully professional story. The next issue included Richard Matheson's first sale, "Born of Man and Woman", widely considered one of the finest stories F&SF ever published. Over the next few years several writers became strongly associated with the magazine, including Margaret St. Clair, Reginald Bretnor, Miriam Allen deFord and Zenna Henderson, and Boucher was also able to attract some of the best-known established names, such as Arthur C. Clarke, Fritz Leiber and Ray Bradbury. Fletcher Pratt and L. Sprague de Camp began their "Gavagan's Bar" series of stories in the first issue of F&SF, and Manly Wade Wellman published the first of his "John the Balladeer" stories in the December 1951 issue. The focus was on short fiction; serials and novels were mainly avoided. One exception was Ward Moore's Bring the Jubilee, an alternative history set in a world where the South wins the American Civil War. Boucher bought "A Canticle for Leibowitz" from Walter M. Miller, who had been unable to sell it elsewhere, and printed it in the April 1955 issue; it was the first story in the series that would become the novel of the same name, and has since become recognized as a classic of the genre.

A controversial article by the astronomer R. S. Richardson titled "The Day After We Land on Mars" appeared in the December 1955 issue; (Note: This was an expanded version of an article that had originally appeared in the Saturday Review.) Richardson commented that an exploration of other worlds would require "the men stationed on a planet [to be] openly accompanied by women to relieve the sexual tensions that develop among normal healthy males". Responses by Poul Anderson and Miriam Allen deFord appeared in F&SF the following year. DeFord argued that Richardson was assuming that women were not people in the same way as men, and the controversy has since been cited as part of the long debate within the genre about the image of women in science fiction.

In 1958 F&SF won its first Hugo Award for Best Magazine, and when Mills became editor that year he maintained the high standards Boucher had set, winning the award again in 1959 and 1960. Mills continued to publish a broad range of material without limiting the magazine to particular subgenres. Ashley cites John Collier, Robert Arthur, Allen Drury and Ray Bradbury, all authors with mainstream reputations who appeared in F&SF in 1960, as evidence of the magazine's diversity. Daniel Keyes had been unable to sell "Flowers for Algernon" until Mills bought it in 1959; it went on to win several awards and according to Clute and Nicholls is "arguably the most popular sf novel ever published". Rogue Moon, a novel about a deadly artifact left by aliens on the moon, is often considered Algis Budrys's best novel; it appeared in 1960, and the following year saw Brian Aldiss's "Hothouse", the first in that series. (Budrys later said that what he described as the "cuteness of the early F&SF school of editing—and its open contempt for the accomplishments of the Campbellian school" had resulted in "buckets and buckets of froth" but, more favorably, "Liberal Arts concepts in what had been almost exclusively a B. S. field".) Zenna Henderson's stories of The People, a group of refugee humanoid aliens hiding on Earth, were published through the 1950s and 1960s and became a "central feature" of the magazine according to sf critic John Clute. Boucher published Damon Knight's "The Country of the Kind", described by Ashley as "one of his most potent stories from the fifties", in 1956, and the same year, under the pseudonym "Grendel Briarton", Reginald Bretnor began a series of punning stories known as "Feghoots" that lasted until 1964. (Note: The Feghoots series was briefly revived in Venture Science Fiction in 1970, and later in the 1970s in Isaac Asimov's Science Fiction Magazine.) At the end of the 1950s, during Mills' tenure as editor, Robert Heinlein's Starship Troopers was serialized in F&SF, under the title Starship Soldier; this was intended to be a juvenile novel but was rejected by Scribner's for being too violent. It won the Hugo Award in the novel category the following year, and proved to be one of Heinlein's most controversial books.

One of Mel Hunter's series of robot covers which began in 1955. This example is from the July 1957 issue.

Among the cover artists in the first decade, sf historian and critic Thomas Clareson singles out the early astronomical scenes by Chesley Bonestell as being the most notable; these were among the first to replace George Salter's surreal artwork on the cover. Kelly Freas and Ed Emshwiller, two of the most popular artists in the sf field, also contributed covers during the 1950s. Mel Hunter began contributing covers with the November 1953 issue, and in October 1955 began a long-running series of covers that depicted a robot survivor of a nuclear holocaust engaging in human activities amidst the desolation—watering a flower, playing with toys, or reading a store catalog, for example. A regular book review column appeared, titled "Recommended Reading"; it was signed simply "The Editors" until McComas ceased to be one of the co-editors, after which Boucher used his own name. According to Clareson, the column "long remained the most catholic appraisal of the field" because of the variety of works reviewed. Boucher did not review his own fiction in the column, though on at least one occasion he listed a new book of his, telling the reader: "Comments eagerly welcomed; in this case, you are the reviewer". When Boucher left, he was succeeded by Damon Knight as book reviewer; Alfred Bester took over in 1960 and remained in the role until Avram Davidson became the book reviewer when he took the editorial chair. Isaac Asimov had begun a series of science articles for Venture Science Fiction in January 1958, and when Venture was cancelled Mills brought the science column over to F&SF. The column, which according to Asimov he enjoyed writing more than any of his other works, ran for decades without interruption, helping to contribute to a long-standing feeling of consistency and continuity in F&SF's format and contents.

Avram Davidson, who became editor in 1962, had sold his first story to F&SF in 1954, though he was better remembered for "The Golem", which appeared in the March 1955 issue. Under Davidson more work appeared by non-English-speaking writers such as Hugo Correa, Herbert Franke and Shin'ishi Hoshi. Notable stories he acquired for F&SF include Terry Carr's first sale, "Who Sups with the Devil?", in 1962, and Roger Zelazny's "A Rose for Ecclesiastes" in November 1963. He published two "author special" issues: Theodore Sturgeon was featured in the September 1962 issue, and Ray Bradbury in May 1963. These author issues, which had been Joseph Ferman's idea, became a regular feature, with subsequent issues featuring Isaac Asimov (October 1966), Fritz Leiber (July 1969), Poul Anderson (April 1971), James Blish (April 1972), Frederik Pohl (September 1973), Robert Silverberg (April 1974), Damon Knight (November 1976), Harlan Ellison (July 1977), Stephen King (December 1990), Lucius Shepard (March 2001), Kate Wilhelm (September 2001), Barry N. Malzberg (June 2003), Gene Wolfe (April 2007) and David Gerrold (September/October 2016).

=== Edward Ferman ===
Joseph Ferman's son, Edward Ferman, was managing editor during Davidson's tenure as editor. When Davidson left, Joseph Ferman took over the editorial chair, but in reality Edward Ferman was doing all the editorial work, and by the May 1965 issue was in full control of the magazine. It remained eclectic through the 1960s and 1970s, publishing work by New Wave writers such as Thomas Disch and John Sladek, along with new U.S. writers such as Samuel Delany and Roger Zelazny, hard science fiction stories by Gregory Benford and John Varley, fantasies by Sterling Lanier and Tom Reamy, and horror by Charles L. Grant and Stephen King. The mid-1960s saw an increase in the diversity of stories appearing elsewhere in the field; magazines like New Worlds and Science Fantasy published material that previously could only have appeared in F&SF. Sf author Christopher Priest, writing in 1978, commented that many writers later considered part of the New Wave soon found "a natural home for their work" in F&SF. In Ashley's view the rest of the field was starting to catch up to F&SF's open-mindedness, but this did not lead to a drop in F&SF's quality; the end of the 1960s saw Ferman printing some old-fashioned material such as John Christopher's novel about miniaturization, The Little People, alongside much of Roger Zelazny's early output, and "anarchic and often indefinable" stories by R. A. Lafferty, Harvey Jacobs and others. In 1968, Piers Anthony's early novel Sos the Rope was serialized; Anthony had won a competition sponsored in part by F&SF.

Harlan Ellison and James Tiptree Jr. were frequent contributors in the 1970s, Tiptree contributing some of her best-known stories, such as "And I Awoke and Found Me Here on the Cold Hill's Side" and "The Women Men Don't See"; Ellison's many stories in F&SF included "The Deathbird", in 1973, which won a Hugo Award, and "Jeffty Is Five" in 1977, which won both a Hugo and a Nebula Award. Other award-winning stories from Ferman's first decade and a half included Fritz Leiber's "Ship of Shadows" in 1969, "Ill Met in Lankhmar" in 1970, and "Catch That Zeppelin" in 1975; all three won Hugos, and the latter two also won Nebulas. Poul Anderson's "The Queen of Air and Darkness" won both a Hugo and a Nebula, Robert Silverberg's "Born with the Dead" won a Nebula, and Frederik Pohl's novel of Martian colonization, Man Plus, also won a Nebula.

Judith Merril took over the book review column on Davidson's departure, and was followed by James Blish in 1970 and Algis Budrys in 1975, with frequent contributions from other reviewers such as Joanna Russ and Gahan Wilson. In 1965 Wilson began contributing cartoons, and continued to do so regularly until 1981. Ferman set a humorous competition for the readers in the November 1971 issue, and thereafter ran two or three similar competitions every year. These were later collected in a 1996 anthology, titled Oi, Robot, the title taken from a competition to add a single letter to a well-known work of SF. A film review column, the first in the magazine since Charles Beaumont's "The Science Screen" (and "William Morrison" aka Joseph Samachson's live-theater column "The Science Stage") in the latter 1950s, conducted by Samuel R. Delany, commenced in 1969; Baird Searles contributed the column between 1970 and 1984. Among the later reviewers, Ellison was one of the most popular, and columns from his first four years were collected as Harlan Ellison's Watching in 1989.

Isaac Asimov's Science Fiction Magazine was launched in 1977 and from 1983, under the editorships of Shawna McCarthy and later Gardner Dozois, it began to publish more mature material, becoming a more direct competitor to F&SF's market niche. Authors such as Lucius Shepard, James Blaylock and John Crowley, whose work was a natural fit for F&SF, were selling to Asimov's as well. The launch of Omni in 1978 also had an impact. For almost every year in the 1970s stories published in F&SF won more award nominations, and were selected for more "Year's Best" anthologies, than the other magazines; in the 1980s that was no longer true, as Asimov's took over the leading role, and Omni sometimes pushed F&SF into third place. Ferman was still able to acquire some highly regarded material, such as "Lost Boys" by Orson Scott Card and Kirinyaga by Mike Resnick. When Omni rejected George R. R. Martin's "Monkey Treatment" and Gardner Dozois's "Down Among the Dead Men", which were dark fantasy, Ferman acquired both. Along with these regular columns, Ferman occasionally published articles, such as "Science Fiction and the University", a feature in the May 1972 issue that included contributions from Darko Suvin, Thomas Clareson and Philip Klass.

F&SF won the Hugo Award for Best Magazine for four consecutive years, from 1969 through 1972, when the award was changed to "Best Professional Editor". Initially this category was dominated by Ben Bova, the editor of Analog, but Ferman won it for three more years at the start of the 1980s.

F&SF dominated the early years of the Locus Award for Best Magazine, winning every year from the award's creation in 1971 until 1982. Another winning streak saw it take home the award for every year from 2002-2010.

Some of the artists who had provided covers for early issues of F&SF, including Chesley Bonestell, Ed Emshwiller and Alex Schomburg, were still contributing their work into the late 1970s, and many of the regular writers from the early years, such as Reginald Bretnor, Ron Goulart and Hilbert Schenck, continued to appear in F&SF into the 1980s. A newer group, including Joanna Russ and R.A. Lafferty, had become regulars more recently. Some established writers such as Thomas Disch published their more unusual work in F&SF, and there were also writers such as Felix C. Gotschalk, whose unusual stories were described by Ferman as "a step ahead of most sf writers (or perhaps he's marching in a different direction)". In Ashley's opinion, Ferman managed to "balance the work of these eccentric writers so that they never distorted the contents yet kept the magazine on the edge".

Newer writers who began to appear regularly in the 1980s included Bruce Sterling, who published his early Shaper/Mechanist stories in F&SF, beginning with "Swarm", in 1982. Stephen King's "The Dark Tower" series had begun in 1979 in F&SF, and four more stories appeared over the next three years before being collected as a novel in 1982; and Michael Shea and Bob Leman contributed horror and weird fiction regularly in the 1980s. Despite the increased competition from Omni and Isaac Asimov's Science Fiction Magazine, Ferman managed to keep F&SF's reputation for quality intact throughout the 1980s; it was not as distinct from its competition as it had once been, but it retained an "idiosyncratic individuality", in Ashley's words.

=== After Ferman ===
Under Kristine Kathryn Rusch F&SF began to publish more dark fantasy and horror stories, such as "The Night We Buried Road Dog" by Jack Cady, which won a Nebula Award. When Rusch took over as editor, Isaac Asimov had been writing the science column for over three decades, and Algis Budrys had been contributing a book review column since 1975; in 1992 Asimov died and Budrys departed. The science column ran for 399 consecutive issues, ending in February 1992. Asimov's widow, Janet Asimov, wrote another essay for the December 1994 issue, based on her conversations with her husband before his death, and a final essay appeared in January 1996, containing material from the book Yours, Isaac Asimov: A Lifetime of Letters. The science column continued to appear, written by Bruce Sterling and Gregory Benford among others, and John Kessel took over the book reviews; Robert Killheffer succeeded Kessel, with some overlap in 1994 and 1995. Asimov's maintained its dominance of the field through the 1990s, though Rusch published well-received material such as "The Martian Child" by David Gerrold and "Last Summer at Mars Hill" by Elizabeth Hand. Rusch won one Hugo Award as editor during her five years at F&SF, in 1994.

Van Gelder printed more fantasy and less hard science fiction than had Rusch, and in Ashley's opinion he was able to "restore some of the magazine's distinctiveness". As a result of the switch to bimonthly in 2009, with the resulting higher page count in each issue, the magazine began to publish longer stories.

=== Assessment ===
F&SF quickly established itself as one of the leading magazines. Ashley describes it as bridging "the attitude gap between the slick magazines and the pulps"', and argues that it made the genre more respectable. The fantasy side of the magazine attracted writers who had been regular contributors to Weird Tales and Unknown, two of the best-known fantasy pulps, and in Ashley's opinion, it soon found a "middle ground" between those pulp traditions and fantasy written for the slicks. It was known as the most literary of the science fiction and fantasy magazines, and it published the most diverse range of material. In a 1978 review of New Wave SF, Christopher Priest agreed that F&SF has a bias for literary work, and added that "it has been a sort of New Wave of its own ever since its inception".

From the 1950s, F&SF was regarded as one of the "big three" science fiction magazines, along with Astounding Science Fiction and Galaxy Science Fiction. In a review of a 1952 issue, James Blish (writing as William Atheling, Jr.) commented that much of the magazine to that point was wonderfully written, and that Boucher's and McComas's editorial acumen made F&SF very readable, but that on occasion a well-written, sophisticated, but unoriginal science fiction story might be accepted by F&SF because it was not a specialist sf magazine. At the end of the 1950s Kingsley Amis described it as "the most highbrow" of the science fiction magazines, and Gary K. Wolfe later said that F&SF, along with Galaxy, "defined the tenor" of the 1950s. In the 1960s, Judith Merril argued that it was Boucher and McComas who made a place in the genre for writers such as Charles Beaumont, Mildred Clingerman, Edgar Pangborn and many others who, in her opinion, had "virtually stopped writing until the necessary new magazine came along". (Note: Quoted by Brian Aldiss and David Wingrove in Trillion Year Spree.)

In 2007, Ashley commented that F&SF had been "the most consistently enjoyable magazine of the last 50 years". In his view, a key reason for the magazine's appeal was that its roots were in the literary tradition, with Lawrence Spivak, its first publisher, the inheritor of H. L. Mencken's American Mercury, which had been successful and widely respected as a literary review. Unlike most of its competitors, F&SF had no connection to the pulp magazine era, and its editors had always intended to appeal to readers of books, rather than of magazines. Ashley also cites F&SF's broad editorial policy, which allowed the magazine to carry a wider range of fiction than its competitors. In 2014 Gary Westfahl praised the "creative editors of the 1980s and 1990s, such as Gardner Dozois ... and Gordon Van Gelder", but added that "such editors were no longer the most important figures in the field".

== Bibliographic details ==
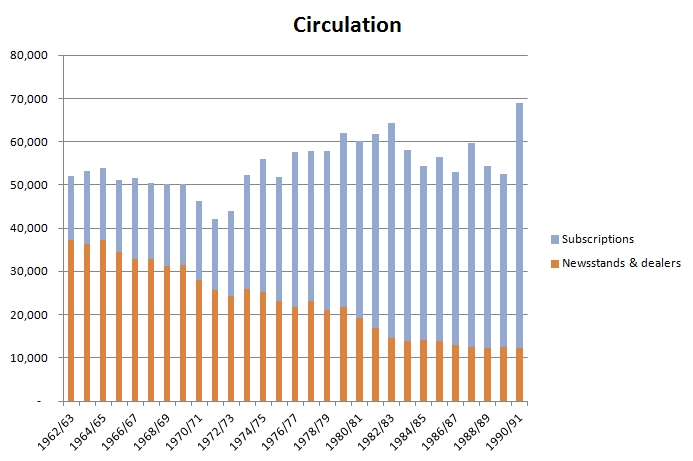
F&SF's circulation from 1962 to 1990

As of March 2017, the editorial succession is as follows:

- Anthony Boucher & J. Francis McComas, Fall 1949 – August 1954
- Anthony Boucher, September 1954 – August 1958
- Robert P. Mills, September 1958 – March 1962
- Avram Davidson, April 1962 – November 1964
- Joseph W. Ferman, December 1964 – December 1965
- Edward L. Ferman, January 1966 – June 1991
- Kristine Kathryn Rusch, July 1991 – May 1997
- Gordon Van Gelder, June 1997 – January 2015
- Charles Coleman Finlay, March/April 2015 – January 2021
- Sheree Renée Thomas, March/April 2021 – present.

The first issue was titled The Magazine of Fantasy; with the second issue the title switched to The Magazine of Fantasy and Science Fiction. The magazine has been in digest format since the beginning.

The publisher was initially Fantasy House, a subsidiary of Mercury Press; from March 1958 the publisher was listed as Mercury Press instead. Since February 2001 the publisher has been Van Gelder's Spilogale, Inc.

The following table lists F&SF's prices over the years. When Joseph Ferman announced the price change in the February 1959 issue, his justification for the increase was that "during the past ten years...paper costs have gone up by 38%, composition, printing, binding and handling costs have gone up by 32%, postages costs have gone up from 33% to 60%, and various other costs have risen as much or more".

Date	Issue price	Special issue details
Fall 1949 – January 1959	35 cents	October 1958 @ 40 cents
February 1959 – December 1964	40 cents	October 1959 (tenth anniversary) @ 50 cents
January 1965 – June 1969	50 cents	
July 1969 – October 1971	60 cents	
November 1971 – February 1975	75 cents	October 1974 (25th anniversary) @ $1.00
March 1975 – February 1978	$1.00	
March 1978 – February 1980	$1.25	October 1979 (30th anniversary) @ $2.50
March 1980 – September 1982	$1.50	
October 1982 – December 1988	$1.75	
January 1989 – December 1990	$2.00	October 1989 (40th anniversary) @ $2.95
January 1991 – November 1993	$2.50	October/November @ $3.95
December 1993 – June 1995	$2.75	October/November @ $3.95
July 1995 – January 1997	$2.95	October/November @ $4.50
February 1997 – June 1998	$2.99	October/November @ $4.59
July 1998 – December 2002	$3.50	October/November @ $4.59 in 1998 & 2000–2001; $5.95 in 1999; $4.99 in 2002
January 2003 – December 2007	$3.99	October/November @ $4.99 from 2003–2006; $5.99 in 2007
January 2007 – December 2008	$4.50	October/November @ $5.99 in 2008
January 2009 – March 2009	$4.99	
April/May 2009 – August/September 2009	$6.50	October/November @ $7.50
December 2009 – December 2010	$7.00	
January 2011 – December 2012	$7.50	
January 2013 – December 2016	$7.99	
January 2017 – December 2020	$8.99	
January 2021 –	$9.99	

=== Anthologies ===
The following anthologies of fiction from F&SF have appeared.

Year	Editor(s)	Title	Publisher
1952	Anthony Boucher & J. Francis McComas	The Best from Fantasy and Science Fiction	Little, Brown
1953	Anthony Boucher & J. Francis McComas	The Best from Fantasy and Science Fiction: Second Series	Little, Brown
1954	Anthony Boucher & J. Francis McComas	The Best from Fantasy and Science Fiction: Third Series	Doubleday
1955	Anthony Boucher	The Best from Fantasy and Science Fiction: Fourth Series	Doubleday
1956	Anthony Boucher	The Best from Fantasy and Science Fiction: Fifth Series	Doubleday
1957	Anthony Boucher	The Best from Fantasy and Science Fiction: Sixth Series	Doubleday
1958	Anthony Boucher	The Best from Fantasy and Science Fiction: Seventh Series	Doubleday
1959	Anthony Boucher	The Best from Fantasy and Science Fiction: Eighth Series	Doubleday
1960	Robert P. Mills	The Best from Fantasy and Science Fiction: Ninth Series	Doubleday
1960	Robert P. Mills	A Decade of Fantasy and Science Fiction	Doubleday
1961	Robert P. Mills	The Best from Fantasy and Science Fiction: Tenth Series	Doubleday
1962	Robert P. Mills	The Best from Fantasy and Science Fiction: Eleventh Series	Doubleday
1963	Avram Davidson	The Best from Fantasy and Science Fiction: Twelfth Series	Doubleday
1964	Avram Davidson	The Best from Fantasy and Science Fiction: 13th Series	Doubleday
1965	Avram Davidson	The Best from Fantasy and Science Fiction: 14th Series	Doubleday
1966	Edward L. Ferman	The Best from Fantasy and Science Fiction: 15th Series	Doubleday
1967	Edward L. Ferman	The Best from Fantasy and Science Fiction: 16th Series	Doubleday
1968	Edward L. Ferman	The Best from Fantasy and Science Fiction: 17th Series	Doubleday
1968	Edward L. Ferman	Once and Future Tales from the Magazine of Fantasy and Science Fiction	Harris-Wolfe
1969	Edward L. Ferman	The Best from Fantasy and Science Fiction: 18th Series	Doubleday
1970	Edward L. Ferman & Robert P. Mills	Twenty Years of Fantasy and Science Fiction	Putnam
1971	Edward L. Ferman	The Best from Fantasy and Science Fiction: 19th Series	Doubleday
1973	Edward L. Ferman	The Best from Fantasy and Science Fiction: 20th Series	Doubleday
1974	Edward L. Ferman	Best From Fantasy and Science Fiction: Twenty-fifth Anniversary Anthology	Doubleday
1977	Edward L. Ferman	The Best from Fantasy and Science Fiction: 22nd Series	Doubleday
1980	Edward L. Ferman	The Best from Fantasy and Science Fiction: 23rd Series	Doubleday
1982	Edward L. Ferman	The Best from Fantasy and Science Fiction: 24th Series	Doubleday
1989	Edward L. Ferman	The Best From Fantasy & Science Fiction: A 40th Anniversary Anthology	St. Martin's
1994	Edward L. Ferman & Kristine Kathryn Rusch	The Best From Fantasy & Science Fiction: A 45th Anniversary Anthology	St. Martin's
1999	Edward L. Ferman & Gordon Van Gelder	The Best From Fantasy & Science Fiction: A 50th Anniversary Anthology	Tor
2003	Gordon Van Gelder	One Lamp	Four Walls Eight Windows
2004	Gordon Van Gelder	In Lands That Never Were	Thunder's Mouth
2005	Gordon Van Gelder	Fourth Planet from the Sun	Thunder's Mouth
2009	Gordon Van Gelder	The Very Best of Fantasy & Science Fiction: 60th Anniversary Anthology	Tachyon
2014	Gordon Van Gelder	The Very Best of Fantasy & Science Fiction: Volume 2	Tachyon

In 1981, Martin H. Greenberg edited a hardcover facsimile edition of the April 1965 issue of F&SF, with the addition of an introduction by Edward Ferman, and memoirs by the authors whose work appeared in the issue. The book was published by Southern Illinois University Press.

=== Overseas editions ===
F&SF has had multiple foreign editions, including:

- Argentina. Minotauro (September 1964 – June 1968), edited by Francisco Porrúa under the alias Ricardo Gosseyn, and published by Ediciones Minotauro, Buenos Aires. Ten issues. The full title was Minotauro fantasía y ciencia-ficción. Minotauro did not reprint individual issues of F&SF; instead each issue was filled with stories selected from various issues of F&SF. Also La revista de ciencia ficción y fantasía (October 1976 – February 1977), edited by Marcial Souto and published by Ediciones Orión. Three issues. This was primarily a reprint edition of F&SF but also published some original material.
- Australia. The Magazine of Fantasy & Science Fiction (November 1954 – August 1958), published by Consolidated Press as a saddle-stapled digest. Fourteen issues. The first six issues were 128 pages long, the next four were 112 pages, and the last four were 96 pages. It was priced at 2/- throughout. The contents were selected from the U.S. magazine but the Australian issues did not correspond to individual issues of the original.
- Brazil. Galáxia 2000 (first issue January 1968), edited by Mario Camarinha, and published by Ediçōes O Cruzeiro. Four or five issues. This contains reprints from not only the U.S. edition of F&SF, but also from the French, Italian and Argentinian versions. This was followed in 1970 by another Magazine de Ficçāo Cientifica, which appeared in April 1970. The editor was initially Jerônymo Monteiro; he died after two issues and was succeeded by his daughter, Theresa Monteiro. The publisher was Revista do Globo. The magazine ran from April 1970 to November 1971, publishing a total of 20 issues, each containing a story by a local writer along with the reprinted material.
- France. Fiction (October 1953 – February 1990), edited by Alain Dorémieux for most of its existence. Four hundred and twelve issues. Fiction included original French stories as well as translations from the English version of the magazine, and occasionally these French stories subsequently appeared in F&SF, translated into English. One example is "Les Premiers jour de mai" by Claude Veillot, which appeared in Fiction in May 1960 and then as "The First Days of May" in F&SF in December 1961, translated by Damon Knight. Since 2005 it has been issued twice a year as a magazine/anthology series.
- Germany. A series of anthologies titled Magazine of Fantasy and Science Fiction began appearing in Germany in 1963, published by Heyne. These contained stories selected from F&SF. The editor was Charlotte Winheller for issues 1–9; Walter Ernsting for issues 10–14; Wulf H. Bergner for issues 15–42; and Manfred Kluge from issue 43 until at least 1985.
- Israel. Fantasia 2000 (December 1978 – 1984), edited by Aharon Hauptman and Gabi Peleg; published by A. Tene for the first 15 issues, and thereafter by Hyperion. 44 issues. Most of Fantasia 2000's contents were translations of material that had originally appeared in F&SF, along with some original stories by Israelis. It included translations of Asimov's science column, and also included departments that did not originate in F&SF, such as a letters page and non-fiction articles.
- Italy. Fantascienza (November 1954 – May 1955), edited by Livio Garzanti, published by Garzanti e i Fratelli Treves. 7 issues. Reprints of issues of F&SF. Also Fantasia & Fantascienza (December 1962 – October 1963), edited by G. Jori, published by Minerva Editrice. Ten monthly issues, omitting May 1963. A reprint of F&SF, but it included some original material as well. Another series of reprints was published by Elara from 2013 to 2017, for a total of 17 issues with irregular periodicity.
- Japan. S-F Magazine (February 1960 – current as of 2017), edited by (among others) Masami Fukushima, Ryozo Nagashima and Imaoka Kiyoshi. This began as a reprint edition of F&SF, but soon began printing more original fiction, and as of 2016 is the leading Japanese science fiction magazine, publishing both original material and stories reprinted from a variety of sources.
- Mexico. Ciencia y Fantasía (September 1955 – December 1957), editor unknown, published by Novaro-México, S.A. 14 issues. Reprinted from F&SF by selecting stories from different issues of the original magazine.
- Norway. Nova – Fantastiske Fortellinger (1971–1979), edited by Terje Wanberg, Øyvind Myhre, Per G. Olson and Johannes H. Berg, published by Stowa Forlag. 34 issues. Initially titled Science Fiction-Magasinet, it began by reprinting from F&SF; from the fourth issue it began to feature new material.
- Sweden. Jules Verne Magasinet (1969–2013), edited and published by Bertil Falk (1969–1971); edited by Sam Lundwall (1972–2013) and published by Askild & Kärnekull (1972), Delta (1973–1983) and Sam J Lundwall Fakta & Fantasi (1983–2010). Starting with the Askild & Kärnekull issues, and until at least the mid-1980s, this contained a large proportion of reprints from F&SF, along with some original material from other sources.
- United Kingdom. Two series, both titled The Magazine of Fantasy & Science Fiction. The first series was published by Mellifont Press, and ran from October 1953 to September 1954, in digest format, with 128 pages, priced at 1/6. The contents were taken from the U.S. magazine, but the UK issues did not directly correspond to individual U.S. issues. The second series was published by Atlas Publishing & Distributing from December 1959 to June 1964, in digest format. All issues were 128 pages except for January 1961 through November 1961 and March 1962 through June 1964, which were 112 pages. The price was 2/- from until November 1961, and 2/6 from December 1961 until the end of the run. As with the first series the reprint issues did not exactly correspond to individual U.S. issues. After the second series ended, some additional material from the U.S. issues was reprinted in the UK edition of Venture Science Fiction.

== Sources ==
- Aldiss, Brian W.; Wingrove, David (1986). Trillion Year Spree: The History of Science Fiction. London: Victor Gollancz Ltd. ISBN 0-575-03943-4.
- Amis, Kingsley (1961) [1960]. New Maps of Hell. New York: Ballantine.
- Ashley, Mike (1997). "The Magazine of Fantasy and Science Fiction". In Clute, John; Grant, John (eds.). The Encyclopedia of Fantasy. New York: St. Martin's Press. pp. 609–611. ISBN 0-312-15897-1.
- Ashley, Mike (2005). Transformations:The Story of the Science-Fiction Magazines from 1950 to 1970. Liverpool: Liverpool University Press. ISBN 0-85323-779-4.
- Ashley, Mike (2007). Gateways to Forever: The Story of the Science-Fiction Magazines from 1970 to 1980. Liverpool: Liverpool University Press. ISBN 978-1-84631-003-4.
- Ashley, Mike (2016). Science Fiction Rebels: The Story of the Science-Fiction Magazines from 1981 to 1990. Liverpool: Liverpool University Press. ISBN 978-1-78138-260-8.
- Atheling, William Jr. (1967) [1964]. The Issue at Hand. Chicago: Advent. OCLC 10224241.
- Berg, Johannes H. (1985). "Norway". In Tymn, Marshall B.; Ashley, Mike (eds.). Science Fiction, Fantasy and Weird Fiction Magazines. Westport, Connecticut: Greenwood Press. pp. 890–891. ISBN 0-313-21221-X.
- Ben-Yehuda, Nachman (1985). "Israel". In Tymn, Marshall B.; Ashley, Mike (eds.). Science Fiction, Fantasy and Weird Fiction Magazines. Westport, Connecticut: Greenwood Press. pp. 870–872. ISBN 0-313-21221-X.
- Carter, Paul A. (1977). The Creation of Tomorrow: Fifty Years of Magazine Science Fiction. New York: Columbia University Press. ISBN 0-231-04211-6.
- Clareson, Thomas D. (1985). "The Magazine of Fantasy and Science Fiction". In Tymn, Marshall B.; Ashley, Mike (eds.). Science Fiction, Fantasy and Weird Fiction Magazines. Westport, Connecticut: Greenwood Press. pp. 377–391. ISBN 0-313-21221-X.
- Clarke, Arthur C. (2002). Greetings, Carbon-Based Bipeds!: Collected Essays, 1934–1998. New York: St. Martin's Griffin. ISBN 0-312-19893-0.
- de Camp, L. Sprague (1953). Science-Fiction Handbook: The Writing of Imaginative Fiction. New York: Hermitage House. OCLC 559803608.
- de Larber, Nicholas S. (1985). "Venture Science Fiction (1969–1970) (1957–1958)". In Tymn, Marshall B.; Ashley, Mike (eds.). Science Fiction, Fantasy and Weird Fiction Magazines. Westport, Connecticut: Greenwood Press. pp. 705–709. ISBN 0-313-21221-X.
- del Rey, Lester (1979). The World of Science Fiction: 1926–1976: The History of a Subculture. New York: Ballantine. ISBN 0-345-25452-X.
- Dolman, Everett Carl (1997). "Military, Democracy, and the State in Robert A. Heinlein's Starship Troopers". In Hassler, Donald M.; Wilcox, Clyde (eds.). Political Science Fiction. Columbia, South Carolina: University of South Carolina Press. ISBN 1-57003-113-4.
- Easton, Tom (2006). Off the Main Sequence. The Borgo Press. ISBN 978-0809500215.
- Grant, John (1997). "King, Stephen". In Clute, John; Grant, John (eds.). The Encyclopedia of Fantasy. New York: St. Martin's Press. pp. 537–539. ISBN 0-312-15897-1.
- Hardy, David (1978). "Art & Artists". In Holdstock, Robert (ed.). Encyclopedia of Science Fiction. London: Octopus Books. pp. 122–141. ISBN 0-7064-0756-3.
- Holmberg, John-Henry; Lundwall, Sam (1985). "Sweden". In Tymn, Marshall B.; Ashley, Mike (eds.). Science Fiction, Fantasy and Weird Fiction Magazines. Westport, Connecticut: Greenwood Press. pp. 895–897. ISBN 0-313-21221-X.
- Knight, Damon (1997) [1985]. Creating Short Fiction. New York: St. Martin's Griffin. ISBN 0-312-15094-6.
- Larbalestier, Justine (2002). The Battle of the Sexes in Science Fiction. Middletown, Connecticut: Wesleyan University Press. ISBN 0-8195-6526-1.
- Marks, Jeffrey (2008). Anthony Boucher: A Biobibliography. Jefferson, North Carolina: McFarland & Company, Inc. ISBN 978-0-7864-3320-9.
- McComas, Annette Pelz (1982). "The Birth and Growth". In McComas, Annette Pelz (ed.). The Eureka Years. New York: Bantam. pp. 5–13. ISBN 0-553-20673-7.
- Montanari, Gianni; de Turres, Gianfranco (1985). "Italy". In Tymn, Marshall B.; Ashley, Mike (eds.). Science Fiction, Fantasy and Weird Fiction Magazines. Westport, Connecticut: Greenwood Press. pp. 872–884. ISBN 0-313-21221-X.
- Pessina, Hector R. (1985a). "Argentina". In Tymn, Marshall B.; Ashley, Mike (eds.). Science Fiction, Fantasy and Weird Fiction Magazines. Westport, Connecticut: Greenwood Press. pp. 848–851. ISBN 0-313-21221-X.
- Pessina, Hector R. (1985b). "Mexico". In Tymn, Marshall B.; Ashley, Mike (eds.). Science Fiction, Fantasy and Weird Fiction Magazines. Westport, Connecticut: Greenwood Press. pp. 886–887. ISBN 0-313-21221-X.
- Priest, Christopher (1978). "Art & Artists". In Holdstock, Robert (ed.). Encyclopedia of Science Fiction. London: Octopus Books. pp. 162–173. ISBN 0-7064-0756-3.
- Rottensteiner, Franz; Luserke, Uwe (1985). "Germany". In Tymn, Marshall B.; Ashley, Mike (eds.). Science Fiction, Fantasy and Weird Fiction Magazines. Westport, Connecticut: Greenwood Press. pp. 862–870. ISBN 0-313-21221-X.
- Shibano, Takumi (1985). "Japan". In Tymn, Marshall B.; Ashley, Mike (eds.). Science Fiction, Fantasy and Weird Fiction Magazines. Westport, Connecticut: Greenwood Press. pp. 884–886. ISBN 0-313-21221-X.
- Thomas, Pascal J. (1985). "France". In Tymn, Marshall B.; Ashley, Mike (eds.). Science Fiction, Fantasy and Weird Fiction Magazines. Westport, Connecticut: Greenwood Press. pp. 857–862. ISBN 0-313-21221-X.
- Weinberg, Robert (1988). A Biographical Dictionary of Science Fiction and Fantasy Artists. Westport, Connecticut: Greenwood Press. ISBN 0-313-24349-2.
- Westfahl, Gary (2014). "The Marketplace". In Latham, Rob (ed.). The Oxford Handbook of Science Fiction. New York: Oxford University Press. pp. 81–92. ISBN 978-0-19-983884-4.
- Wolfe, Gary K. (2003). "Science Fiction and its Editors". In James, Edward; Mendlesohn, Farah (eds.). The Cambridge Companion to Science Fiction. New York: Cambridge University Press. pp. 96–109. ISBN 0-521-81626-2.
