= Marshall Tymn =

American bibliographer (1937–2020)

Marshall Benton Tymn (11 December 1937 – 24 May 2020) was an editor, academic and bibliographer of science fiction and fantasy. He received the Pilgrim Award in 1990. He was a founder of the Instructors of Science Fiction in Higher Education.

== Bibliography ==
- A Directory of Science Fiction and Fantasy Publishing Houses and Book Dealers (1974)
- A Research Guide to Science Fiction Studies: An Annotated Checklist of Primary and Secondary Sources (1977) (with L.W. Currey and Roger C. Schlobin)
- Index to Stories in Thematic Anthologies of Science Fiction (1978) (with L.W. Currey; Martin H. Greenberg and Joseph D. Olander)
- The Year's Scholarship in Science Fiction and Fantasy: 1972-1975 (1979) (with Roger C. Schlobin)
- Recent Critical Studies on Fantasy Literature: An Annotated Checklist (1978)
- A Basic Reference Shelf for Science Fiction Teachers (1978)
- American Fantasy and Science Fiction: Toward a Bibliography of Works Published in the United States, 1948-1973 (1979)
- Fantasy Literature: A Core Collection and Reference Guide (1979) (with Robert H. Boyer and Kenneth J. Zahorski)
- Horror Literature: A Core Collection and Reference Guide (1981)
- The Science Fiction Reference Book (ed.) (1981)
- A Teacher's Guide to Science Fiction (1981)
- Survey of Science Fiction Literature: Biographical Supplement (1982)
- The Year's Scholarship in Science Fiction and Fantasy: 1976-1979 (1983) (with Roger C. Schlobin)
- The Year's Scholarship in Science Fiction, Fantasy and Horror Literature: 1980 (1983)
- The Year's Scholarship in Science Fiction, Fantasy and Horror Literature: 1981 (1984)
- The Year's Scholarship in Science Fiction, Fantasy and Horror Literature: 1982 (1985)
- Science Fiction, Fantasy and Weird Fiction Magazines (1985) (with Mike Ashley)
- Science Fiction: A Teacher's Guide & Resource Book (ed.) (1988)
- The Celebration of the Fantastic: Selected Papers from the Tenth Anniversary International Conference on the Fantastic in the Arts (1992) (with Csilla Bertha and Donald E. Morse)
- Fantasy and Horror (1999) (with Neil Barron)
