= Ill Met in Lankhmar =

Novella by Fritz Leiber

- Short story by Fritz Lieber
- Language: English
- Genre: Sword and sorcery

Publication
- Published in: The Magazine of Fantasy & Science Fiction
- Media type: Magazine
- Publication date: April 1970
- Awards: Nebula Award for Best Novella, Hugo Award for Best Novella
- Series: Fafhrd and the Gray Mouser

"Ill Met in Lankhmar" is a sword and sorcery novella by American writer Fritz Leiber, recounting the meeting and teaming-up of his adventurous duo, Fafhrd and the Gray Mouser.

First published in 1970 in the Magazine of Fantasy and Science Fiction, it is a prequel, as Leiber had by that time been chronicling the pair's adventures for thirty years. The story forms part four of the collection Swords and Deviltry.

It was awarded the 1970 Nebula Award for Best Novella and the 1971 Hugo Award for Best Novella.

== Plot summary ==
One murky night in Lankhmar, Fissif and Slevyas, members of the Thieves' Guild, steal some valuable jewels from Jengao the gem merchant. While returning to the Thieves' House, they are ambushed by both the Gray Mouser and Fafhrd simultaneously, who steal their gems. Recognizing kindred spirits, they agree to share the loot. They return to Mouser's lodgings, where Fafhrd is introduced to Mouser's woman Ivrian, while Ivrian meets Fafhrd's love interest, Vlana.

Somewhat drunk, Mouser persuades Fafhrd to join him in a quest to infiltrate the headquarters of the Thieves' Guild, in the guise of members of the Beggars' Guild. They are initially successful, but their disguise comes unstuck when the Mouser's glib story is seen through by Krovas, Grandmaster of the Thieves, and the Beggarmaster. Fleeing, they return to Mouser's hovel, only to find to their horror that both girls have been killed and partially eaten by giant rats, as well as by Slivikin, a fast-moving evil witch-beast conjured up by Krovas's warlock, Hristomilo.

In grief and anger, they return to the Thieves' House and charge in, causing panic and chaos. They kill Hristomilo, before fleeing from the city.
