= Cele Goldsmith Lalli =

Michael and Cele Goldsmith Lalli, 1980s

Cele Goldsmith Lalli (1933 – January 14, 2002) was an American editor. She was the editor of Amazing Stories from 1959 to 1965, Fantastic from 1958 to 1965, and later the Editor-in-Chief of Modern Bride magazine.

== Biography ==
Goldsmith joined the science fiction/fantasy field in 1955, working as Howard Browne's secretary and assistant (and particularly on the short-lived magazine Pen Pals), and, after Browne resigned, with his successor Paul W. Fairman. When Fairman left Ziff-Davis in 1958, Goldsmith took over as editor of Amazing Stories and Fantastic. Goldsmith was open to new authors and experimentation in writing, with the result that between 1961 and 1964 Amazing and Fantastic were "the two most exciting and original magazines" in the SF and fantasy fields.

Among her discoveries were Thomas M. Disch, Ursula K. Le Guin, Keith Laumer, Sonya Dorman (as a fiction writer), Larry Eisenberg, and Roger Zelazny. She was also instrumental in bringing Fritz Leiber out of an early writer's-block-induced retirement (a 1959 issue was devoted entirely to his fiction), and was among the first US editors to publish British author J. G. Ballard.

Goldsmith married in 1964 and took Lalli as her last name. By this time, she'd received a special award from the World Science Fiction Convention for her work on the magazines. Le Guin and subsequent Fantastic and Amazing editors Barry N. Malzberg and Ted White have taken care to note the significance of her achievement.

In 1965, Ziff-Davis sold the two fiction magazines to publisher Sol Cohen, who founded Ultimate Publications to publish them. Lalli continued at Ziff-Davis, where she worked at Modern Bride magazine for 30 years.

=== Death ===
Not long after her retirement, she was killed in a car accident in Newtown, Connecticut, on January 14, 2002.
