= Robert P. Mills =

American magazine editor and literary agent (1920–1986)

Robert Park Mills (February 10, 1920−February 7, 1986) was an American crime- and science fiction magazine editor and literary agent.

Mills was the managing editor of Ellery Queen's Mystery Magazine beginning in 1948 and The Magazine of Fantasy and Science Fiction from its inception in 1949; he took over as editor upon the resignation of Anthony Boucher in 1958; while EQMM was sold by publishers Mercury Press in 1958 to B. G. Davis, Mills briefly remained on staff there during the transition and continued to edit Mercury Mystery Book-Magazine till its folding. From 1957-1958, he also served as editor of Venture Science Fiction Magazine, and Bestseller Mystery Magazine till it folded in 1961. Under Mills, F&SF won three Hugo Awards for best magazine (in 1959, 1960 and 1963). He also edited several "Best of" volumes based on the contents of F&SF among other anthologies. He was succeeded as editor by Avram Davidson in 1962 and became a literary agent. As an agent, he represented James Baldwin, Katherine Dunham, Harlen Ellison, Richard Fariña, Ted Gottfried, James Gunn, and M. D. Post, among others.
