= Sol Cohen =

American publisher (1910–1988)

- Born: December 16, 1910; New York, U.S.
- Died: July 28, 1988 (aged 77); Fort Lauderdale, Florida, U.S.
- Occupations: Publisher, Editor

Sol Cohen (December 16, 1910 – July 28, 1988) was an American publisher who worked mostly in the science fiction field.

== Career ==
Cohen started his long association with Avon Publications in 1947, working as an editor for their comics division from 1947–1956. During this same period, from 1947–1949, Cohen was the circulation director and business manager of EC Comics. Also during this period, Cohen became associated with Golden Age comics financier Harry Donenfeld; in 1949 the two men helped found the publisher Youthful Magazines.

Cohen edited Avon magazines, including Avon Science Fiction & Fantasy Reader, through most of the 1950s, eventually became an Avon Books vice-president. When Cohen's stock gains from that job enabled him to retire in the early 1960s, he decided to continue working in publishing, and joined Robert Guinn at Galaxy Science Fiction.

Cohen left Galaxy in 1965, and bought Amazing Stories and Fantastic from Ziff-Davis, forming a new publishing company, Ultimate Publishing, to do so. Cohen's tenure as publisher of Amazing Stories and Fantastic was filled with conflicts with his editors, contributors, and the Science Fiction Writers of America.

In 1977, Cohen sold his half of the business to his partner, Arthur Bernhard, and moved to Fort Lauderdale. He died in July 1988.
