= Edward L. Ferman =

American magazine editor and publisher

Edward Lewis Ferman (born March 6, 1937) is an American science fiction and fantasy editor and magazine publisher, known best as the editor of The Magazine of Fantasy and Science Fiction (F&SF).

Ferman is the son of Joseph W. Ferman, the publisher and sometime editor who established F&SF in 1949. The younger Ferman was the managing editor under Avram Davidson starting in April 1962. Joseph Ferman was again listed as editor 1964–65. Edward then formally became editor in January 1966 where he remained until June 1991. Ferman became publisher as well, by 1970, as his father gradually retired.

When he hired Kristine Kathryn Rusch as his replacement, he continued as publisher of F&SF. In 2000, he sold it to Gordon Van Gelder. During Ferman's tenure, many other speculative fiction magazines struggled or went out of business. His magazine, along with Analog, continued to maintain a regular schedule and to receive critical appreciation for its contents.

During 1969 and 1970, Ferman was also the editor of F&SF's sister publication Venture Science Fiction Magazine. Together, the Fermans also edited and published the short-lived nostalgia and humor magazine P.S. and a similarly brief run of a magazine about mysticism and other proto-New Age matters, Inner Space.

At least in the last decade of his tenure, he worked from a table in the family's Connecticut house. He edited or co-edited several volumes of stories from F&SF and co-edited Final Stage and other collections with Barry N. Malzberg. It is probable that he also ghost-edited No Limits for or with Joseph Ferman, an anthology drawn from the pages of the first run of Venture.

== Awards ==
Ferman won the Hugo Award for Best Professional Editor three years in a row, from 1981 through 1983 and was nominated 17 times. F&SF had previously won four Hugos as the best professional magazine under his editorship.

Ferman was recognized by a special World Fantasy Award for professional work in 1979 and by the World Fantasy Award for Life Achievement in 1998. In 1981 he received a special honor from Worldcon "for his effort to expand and improve the field'. He was inducted by the Science Fiction Hall of Fame in 2009.

He was nominated 13 times for a reader polled Locus Award for his anthologies. He won in 1981 for the 30 Year Retrospective. For the Science Fiction Chronicle Readers Poll he was nominated 11 times. He won 4 times for professional editor of magazines, in 1982 as editor, and 1983 as professional editor.

== Collections edited by Ferman ==
- Multiple series of The Best from Fantasy and Science Fiction annuals
- Arena:Sports SF, with Barry N. Malzberg, (Doubleday, 1976)
- The Best Horror Stories from the Magazine of Fantasy & Science Fiction, with Anne Jordan, (St Martins Press, 1988)
- The Best Horror Stories from The Magazine of Fantasy & Science Fiction (Vol. 2), with Anne Jordan, (St Martins Press, 1989)
- Final Stage: The Ultimate Science Fiction Anthology, with Barry N. Malzbert, (Charterhouse, 1974)
- Graven Images, with Barry N. Malzberg, (Thomas Nelson Inc, 1977)
- Oi, Robot: competitions and cartoons from The Magazine of Fantasy & Science Fiction (Mercury Press, 1995)
