= Fred Saberhagen bibliography =

This is complete list of works by American science fiction and fantasy author Fred Saberhagen.

== Works ==
=== The Dracula Series ===
Saberhagen was inspired to write the first novel in the series, The Dracula Tape, as a result of "re-reading Stoker's original, and being struck by the fact that this titanic character was hardly ever on stage, though of course central to the book. Naturally in my contrarian way I wondered what he was really doing and thinking while the other characters made their plans to hunt him down, and as soon as I started listening for his voice, I heard it."

Saberhagen's Dracula novels are based on the premise that vampires are morally equal to normal humans: they have the power to do good or evil; it is their choice. The Dracula Tape is the story of Bram Stoker's Dracula told from Dracula's point of view. Saberhagen depicts Dracula as the historical voivode Vlad Ţepeş (known as Drakulya, meaning "Dragon") who, in Saberhagen's stories, became a vampire after being assassinated. According to the character, he refused to die "by a transcendent act of will", but it is apparent that even he is uncertain how he really became a vampire. Most vampires in the series are created when a human drinks the blood of another vampire, which he claims he never did. In this version, Dracula survives the best efforts of Harker, Van Helsing, and company, who are portrayed largely as bungling fools; Van Helsing in particular is seen as sacrilegious, manipulative, and not as knowledgeable about vampires as he believes himself to be. ("Imbecile is one of the most charitable names that I can find for him.")

Dracula is depicted as violent and ill-tempered but nonetheless bound by his own sense of honor and loyalty to his loved ones. Dracula, in his mortal life, fought the encroachment of the Ottoman Empire into Europe. ("Why, there is hardly a foot of soil in all this region which has not been enriched by the blood of men, patriots or invaders.") In later novels, Dracula interacts with other literary characters, including Sherlock Holmes. This series was often listed in Ace promotional materials as "The New Dracula", but the flyleaf of the Tor editions of the books published from A Matter of Taste onwards list the other books in the series under the heading "The Dracula Series". His success with this series was such that he was hired to write the novelization of the 1992 movie Bram Stoker's Dracula.

1. The Dracula Tape (Warner June 1975/Ace January 1980)
2. The Holmes-Dracula File (Ace November 1978) (Note: Seance for a Vampire, set in 1903, is next in the reading order.)
3. An Old Friend of the Family (Ace June 1979)
4. Thorn (Ace September 1980; text restored and/or revised: Tor February 1990)
5. Dominion (Tor June 1982)

- "From the Tree of Time" (short story), in: Sorcerer's Apprentice #14 1982; also in The Vampire Tales (JSS Literary Productions 2019)

6. A Matter of Taste (Tor July 1990)
7. A Question of Time (Tor May 1992)
8. Seance for a Vampire (Tor June 1994); republished as The Further Adventures of Sherlock Holmes: Seance for a Vampire (Titan Books, June 2010)
9. A Sharpness on the Neck (Tor October 1996)

- "Box Number Fifty" (short story), in: Dracula in London, ed. P. N. Elrod (Ace November 2001); also in The Vampire Tales (JSS Literary Productions 2019)

10. A Coldness In the Blood (Tor October 2002)

Volumes 3 & 4 were reprinted in an omnibus version called Vlad Tapes (Baen July 2000)

=== The Ardneh sequence ===
==== The Empire of the East series ====
1. The Broken Lands (Ace 1968)
2. The Black Mountains (Ace 1971)
3. Changeling Earth (DAW February 1973); revised as Ardneh's World for 1979 printing, see below
4. Ardneh's Sword (Tor May 2006)

Volumes 1, 2 & 3 were later republished in a heavily revised omnibus version called Empire of the East (Ace October 1979)

==== The Books of Swords ====
1. The First Book of Swords (Tor March 1983)
2. The Second Book of Swords (Tor November 1983)
3. The Third Book of Swords (Tor August 1984)

The three volumes were reprinted in an omnibus version called The Complete Book of Swords (SFBC/Nelson Doubleday January 1985), later called The First Swords (Tor February 1999)

==== The Books of Lost Swords ====
1. Woundhealer's Story: The First Book of Lost Swords (Tor October 1986)
2. Sightblinder's Story: The Second Book of Lost Swords (Tor November 1987)
3. Stonecutter's Story: The Third Book of Lost Swords (Tor May 1988)
4. Farslayer's Story: The Fourth Book of Lost Swords (Tor July 1989)
5. Coinspinner's Story: The Fifth Book of Lost Swords (Tor December 1989)
6. Mindsword's Story: The Sixth Book of Lost Swords (Tor December 1990)
7. Wayfinder's Story: The Seventh Book of Lost Swords (Tor June 1992)
8. Shieldbreaker's Story: The Last Book of Swords (Tor February 1994)

Volumes 1, 2 & 3 were reprinted in an omnibus version called The Lost Swords: The First Triad (SFBC/Nelson Doubleday September 1988); Volumes 4, 5 & 6 were reprinted in a second omnibus version called The Lost Swords: The Second Triad (Tor/SFBC May 1991); Volumes 7 & 8 were reprinted in a third and final omnibus version called The Lost Swords: Endgame (SFBC/GuildAmerica Books June 1994)

==== Original Swords anthology ====
- An Armory of Swords (Tor June 1995), an original anthology of Swords tales edited by Saberhagen:
1. "Blind Man's Blade" (novelette)
2. "Woundhealer", Walter Jon Williams (novelette)
3. "Fealty", Gene Bostwick (novelette)
4. "Dragon Debt", Robert E. Vardeman (novelette)
5. "The Sword of Aren-Nath" (novelette)
6. "Glad Yule", Pati Nagle (novella)
7. "Luck of the Draw", Michael A. Stackpole (novelette)
8. "Stealth and the Lady", Sage Walker (novelette)

=== The Berserker series ===
The Berserker stories tell about an ongoing war between humanity and the Berserkers. Saberhagen's Berserkers are self-replicating war machines programmed with one main objective: destroy all life. After destroying both their creators and the opposing side in a long-ago galactic war, the self-replicating Berserkers have continued to wipe out all forms of life that they encounter in the Milky Way, which leads to the cooperation and coordination of most of the sentient races in major attempts to defeat them. Humankind, although relatively new to the galactic scene, is a major player because of its aggressive nature. The series spans a large range of both time and space, and so has less plot continuity than Saberhagen's other series.

1. Berserker (Ballantine January 1967/Ace September 1978) (short fiction collection)
2. Brother Assassin (Ballantine January 1969) / as Brother Berserker (Macdonald February 1969/Ace December 1978); read online; book version of the following linked novellas:

- "Stone Man" (novella) Worlds of Tomorrow May 1967
- "The Winged Helmet“ (novella) If August 1967
- "Brother Berserker“ (novella) If November 1967

3. Berserker's Planet (novel) If May/June 1974 (+1/DAW April 1975/Ace May 1980)
4. Berserker Man (Ace April 1979)
5. The Ultimate Enemy (Ace September 1979) (short fiction collection)

- The Berserker Wars (Tor December 1981) (short fiction collection; only 2 original/uncollected stories); read all stories online

6. Berserker Base (Tor March 1985); Mosaic Berserker novel with several guest authors contributing original stories; Saberhagen wrote the overarching story in segments between them, using the Niven story as the novel's fulcrum point:
  - "What Makes Us Human“, Stephen R. Donaldson (novelette) F&SF August 1984
  - "With Friends Like These“, Connie Willis (novelette) F&SF February 1985
  - "Itself Surprised“, Roger Zelazny (novelette) Omni August 1984
  - "Deathwomb“, Poul Anderson (novelette) Analog November 1983
  - "Pilots of the Twilight“, Edward Bryant (novella) Asimov’s mid-December 1984
  - "A Teardrop Falls“, Larry Niven (short story) Omni June 1983
7. The Berserker Throne (Fireside/Simon & Schuster May 1985)
8. Berserker: Blue Death (Tor November 1985)

- The Berserker Attack (Tor/OtherWorlds Club 1987) (short fiction collection; no original/uncollected stories)
- Berserker Lies (Tor September 1991) (short fiction collection; one original story)

9. Berserker Kill (Tor October 1993)
10. Berserker Fury (Tor August 1997)
11. Shiva in Steel (Tor September 1998)

- Berserkers: The Beginning (Baen July 1998) (omnibus of Volumes 1 & 5 above)

12. Berserker's Star (Tor June 2003)
13. Berserker Prime (Tor January 2004)

- Berserker Man: Mega Book (Baen October 2004) (omnibus of Volumes 2, 3, 4 & 7 above)
- Berserker Death: Mega Book (Baen February 2005) (omnibus of Volumes 8, 9 & The Berserker Wars, above)

14. Rogue Berserker (Baen January 2005)

Saberhagen also has credits for game design on a video game based on the novels called Berserker Raids.

=== The Books of the Gods ===
1. The Face of Apollo (Tor April 1998)
2. Ariadne's Web (Tor January 2000)
3. The Arms of Hercules (Tor November 2000)
4. God of the Golden Fleece (Tor August 2001)
5. Gods of Fire and Thunder (Tor August 2002)

Volumes 1, 2 & 3 were reprinted in an omnibus version called The Books of the Gods, Part One (SFBC December 2000); Volumes 4 & 5 were reprinted in a second omnibus version called The Books of the Gods, Part Two (SFBC October 2002)

=== Boris Brazil: The Space Force Chronicles ===
- "Planeteer" (novelette) Galaxy April 1961

1. The Golden People (Ace Double 1964) / revised & expanded: (Baen September 1984)
2. The Water of Thought (Ace Double 1965) / text restored and/or revised: (Pinnacle/Tor May 1981 : First Complete Edition. Illustrated by Janet Aulisio)

=== Pilgrim, the Flying Dutchman of Time ===
1. Pyramids (Baen January 1987)
2. After the Fact (Baen March 1988)

Both novels were reprinted in an omnibus version called Pilgrim (Baen December 1997)

=== Non-series novels ===
- Love Conquers All (novel) Galaxy November 1974/Ace January 1979)
- Specimens (Popular Library January 1976/Ace March 1981)
- The Veils of Azlaroc (Ace October 1978); revised and expanded from the following:
  - "To Mark the Year on Azlaroc“ (short story) Science Fiction Discoveries, ed. Carol & Frederik Pohl, Bantam 1976
- The Mask of the Sun (Ace February 1979); reprinted in the Saberhagen memorial anthology Golden Reflections, see below
- Octagon (Ace July 1981)
- Coils (with Roger Zelazny) (Wallaby/Simon & Schuster May 1982/SFBC July 1982/Tor November 1982)
- A Century of Progress (Tor September 1983)
- The Frankenstein Papers (Baen February 1986)
- The White Bull (Baen December 1988); revised & expanded from the following:
  - "The White Bull“ (novelette) Fantastic November 1976
- The Black Throne (with Roger Zelazny) (Baen October 1990)
- Bram Stoker's Dracula (with James V. Hart) (Signet/New American Library November 1992); novelization of the Francis Ford Coppola film.
- Merlin's Bones (Tor April 1995)
- Dancing Bears (Tor January 1996)
- The Arrival (Earth: Final Conflict) (Ebury November 1999/Tor December 1999)

=== Non-series collections ===
1. The Book of Saberhagen (DAW January 1975)
2. * "The Long Way Home" (short story) Galaxy June 1961; read online as a part of collection Of Berserkers, Swords and Vampires, see below
3. * "Planeteer" (novelette) Galaxy April 1961
4. * "Volume PAA-PYX" (short story) Galaxy February 1961; read online as a part of collection Of Berserkers, Swords and Vampires, see below
5. * "Seven Doors to Mental Education" (short story) If May 1961
6. * "Deep Space" (short story) *
7. * "Peer Pressure and How to Deal With It" (short story) If June 1967 {a.k.a. "Berserker's Prey"}
8. * "Starsong" (short story) If January 1968; read online as a part of collection The Berserker Wars, see above
9. * "Calendars" (short story) Galaxy January 1974
10. * "Young Girl at an Open Half-door" (short story) F&SF November 1968
11. * "WHAT DO YOU WANT ME TO DO TO PROVE I'M HUMAN STOP" (short story) Analog October 1974 (a.k.a. "Inhuman Error"). Set in the Berserker universe.
12. Earth Descended (Tor October 1981)
13. * "Young Girl at an Open Half-door" (short story) F&SF November 1968
14. * "Adventure of the Metal Murderer" (short story) Omni January 1980 {a.k.a. "Metal Murderer"}; read online as a part of collection The Berserker Wars, see above
15. * "Earthshade" (novelette) The Magic May Return, ed. Larry Niven, ill. Alicia Austin, Ace 1981
16. * "The White Bull" (novelette) Fantastic November 1976
17. * "Calendars" (short story) Galaxy January 1974
18. * "Wilderness" (short story) Amazing Sept. 1976
19. * "Patron of the Arts" (short story) If August 1965; read online as a part of collection The Berserker Wars, see above
20. * "To Mark the Year on Azlaroc" (short story) Science Fiction Discoveries, ed. Carol & Frederik Pohl, Bantam 1976 {later expanded into The Veils of Azlaroc, see above}
21. * "Victory" (novelette) F&SF June 1979
22. * "Birthdays" (novella) Galaxy March 1976
23. * "Recessional" (short story) Destinies Fall 1980
24. * "Where Thy Treasure Is" (short story) Destinies Vol. 3 #2 1981
25. Saberhagen: My Best (Baen May 1987)
26. * "The Graphic of Dorian Gray" (short story) New Destinies Vol. 1, Baen 1987
27. * "Birthdays" (novella) Galaxy March 1976
28. * "The Long Way Home" (short story) Galaxy June 1961; read online as a part of collection Of Berserkers, Swords and Vampires, see below
29. * "Smasher" (novelette) F&SF August 1978
30. * "The White Bull" (novelette) Fantastic November 1976
31. * "Wilderness" (short story) Amazing Sept. 1976
32. * "The Peacemaker" (short story) If August 1964 {a.k.a. "The Life Hater"}
33. * "Victory" (novelette) F&SF June 1979
34. * "Goodlife" (novelette) Worlds of Tomorrow December 1963
35. * "Young Girl at an Open Half-door" (short story) F&SF November 1968
36. * "Adventure of the Metal Murderer" (short story) Omni January 1980 {a.k.a. "Metal Murderer"}; read online as a part of collection The Berserker Wars, see above
37. * "From the Tree of Time" (short story) Sorcerer’s Apprentice #14 1982
38. * "Martha" (vi) Amazing December 1976
39. * "Intermission" (vi) Fifty Extremely SF* Stories, ed. Michael Bastraw, Niekas 1982
40. * "Earthshade" (novelette) The Magic May Return, ed. Larry Niven, ill. Alicia Austin, Ace 1981
41. * "Recessional" (short story) Destinies Fall 1980
42. Of Berserkers, Swords & Vampires (Baen June 2009); Read free samples
43. * Introduction, Joan Saberhagen (introduction) *
44. * "The Long Way Home" (short story) Galaxy June 1961
45. * "Volume PAA-PYX" (short story) Galaxy February 1961
46. * "To Mark the Year on Azlaroc" (short story) Science Fiction Discoveries, ed. Carol & Frederik Pohl, Bantam 1976; {later expanded into The Veils of Azlaroc, see above}
47. * "Martha" (vi) Amazing December 1976
48. * "Planeteer" (novelette) Galaxy April 1961
49. * "Blind Man's Blade" (novelette) An Armory of Swords, ed. Fred Saberhagen, Tor 1995
50. * "Stone Place" (novelette) If March 1965; read online as a part of collection The Berserker Wars, see above
51. * "The Bad Machines" (novelette) The Williamson Effect, ed. Roger Zelazny, Tor 1996
52. * "The White Bull" (novelette) Fantastic November 1976
53. * The Dracula Tape (excerpt) Warner 1975
54. * "Box Number Fifty" (short story) Dracula in London, ed. P. N. Elrod, Ace 2001
55. * "A Drop of Something Special in the Blood" (short story) Emerald Magic: Great Tales of Irish Fantasy, ed. Andrew M. Greeley, Tor 2004

=== Non-series anthologies ===
- A Spadeful of Spacetime (Ace February 1981)
- Pawn to Infinity (with Joan Saberhagen) (Ace June 1982)
- Machines That Kill (with Martin H. Greenberg) (Ace December 1984)

=== Fred Saberhagen memorial anthology ===
- Golden Reflections (Baen February 2011); an original anthology of short fiction set (more-or-less) in the world of Saberhagen's novel The Mask of the Sun, edited by Robert E. Vardeman & Joan Saberhagen
1. Golden Reflections in the Maelstrom, Robert E. Vardeman (introduction)
2. Golden Reflections Origins, Joan Saberhagen (introduction)
3. The Mask of the Sun, Fred Saberhagen (novel) Ace February 1979
4. "The Fate Line“, Walter Jon Williams (novelette)
5. "Wax, Clay, Gold“, Daniel Abraham (novelette)
6. "The Conquistador's Hat“, John Maddox Roberts (short story)
7. "Eyewear“, Harry Turtledove (novelette)
8. "Like the Rain“, Jane Lindskold (novelette)
9. "Remember“, Dean Wesley Smith (novelette)
10. "Washington's Rebellion“, David Weber (novella)
