= Magic sword =

Sword with magical powers or other supernatural qualities

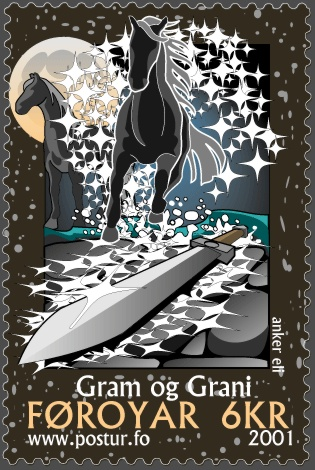
Faroe stamp by Anker Eli Petersen depicting the magical sword Gram

In mythology, legend or fiction, a magic sword is a sword with magical powers or other supernatural qualities. Renowned swords appear in the folklore of every nation that used swords.

In some traditions, the sword is ascribed no powers of its own. It is famous because it is the hero's sword, or because of its origin, as when a god gives it to the hero. Other swords keep their wielders safe or destroy their enemies. A more localized motif is the sword that has been broken and must be reforged, commonly found in Northern Europe. Such a sword symbolizes the initial defeat and loss of honor of its wielder. Subsequent victory and the restoration of honor is achieved by reforging it, either at the wielder's hand or that of his heir.

== History ==
It is probable that the roots of the sentient weapon myths stem from ancient peoples' belief that sword making and metallurgy was in fact a magical process. Through the fires of the forge (fire was also given spiritual connotations) a lump of earth was transformed into a shiny usable object that could be hammered into many shapes. Extending further from the transformation of ore into metal, the difficulty of actually obtaining a quality blade; which took intense concentration and skill added to its esoteric qualities. While any blacksmith could manufacture a knife or an axehead only a swordsmith could create a high quality sword. The secrets of doing so were jealously guarded as well as formulas for alloys.

The skill necessary to forge a balanced blade - one which is not too brittle or too soft and able to hold a usefully sharp edge - in the age before automated machines, blast furnaces, and the knowledge of molecular chemistry made the creation of a sword seem almost miraculous. A few degrees too hot or too cold within a very limited temperature range, which could only be discerned by the glowing hue of a hot billet, could make or break a sword. A lack of expertise in knowing when and how to apply carbon and flux and quench the blade could ruin weeks of work. Thus the swordsmith almost felt like he was one with his work, giving the process his complete devotion of concentration and thought. This led to the belief that he was actually imbuing the blade with an essence of his spirit. In Japan, the swordsmiths were so concerned with this belief that they would undergo purification rituals and meditation before even attempting to start a new blade, for fear that they might inadvertently create an evil sword.

The Vikings prized their swords above all other things, handing them down from generation to generation and giving them names. The value of the blade was not only determined by its quality but also by how many battles that it was used in. Polynesian people such as the Māori also had comparable reverence for their weapons. They believed a weapon contained a spiritual force called mana and that the weapon held the spirits of its maker, its line of owners and also stole the spirits of those it killed. These weapons where highly prized for their mana and cherished as heirlooms. The Samurai of Japan believed that their swords had their own soul that could possess them. It was not the wielder but their swords that desired to kill; Samurai were just the instrument that the sword used to complete that task. Since most of them were Buddhists (a religion that finds violence and murder abhorent), that train of thought gave them some peace of mind in their killing vocation.

Later, as the concept of demons, spiritual possession, and elementals entered the realm of mythological themes, it was only a natural leap to attribute magical properties of the swords of folklore to indwelling spirits.

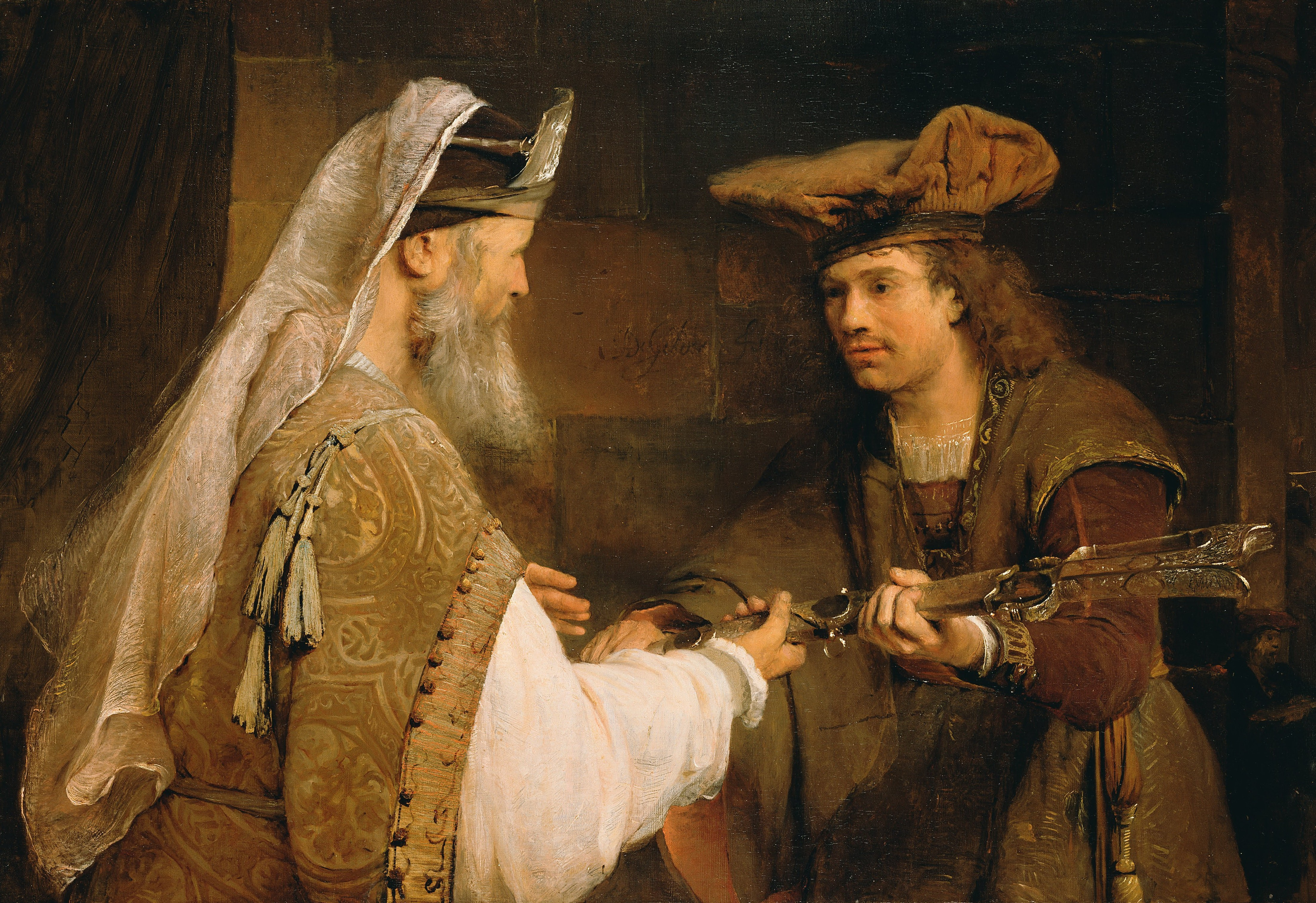
Ahimelech giving the sword of Goliath to David, by Aert de Gelder.

Magic swords may exhibit various degrees of sentience, from being merely influenced by the wielder to being able to think for itself or even control its owner.

== Biblical ==
The Bible relates in the Book of Genesis how God, seeking to deter Adam and Eve from returning to the Garden of Eden, "placed at the east of the garden of Eden Cherubim and a flaming sword which turned every way". By some accounts, the Cherubim are replaced with the Archangel Michael, who wields a similar weapon. King David was given the sword of the slain giant Goliath by the priest Ahimelech, to which was attached extra-biblical mythology and traditions. In the Book of Revelation, Jesus is symbolically described wielding a double-edged sword that proceeds out from his mouth, in reference to the "sword of the spirit" which is the "word of truth".

== Mythological ==
=== Arthurian ===
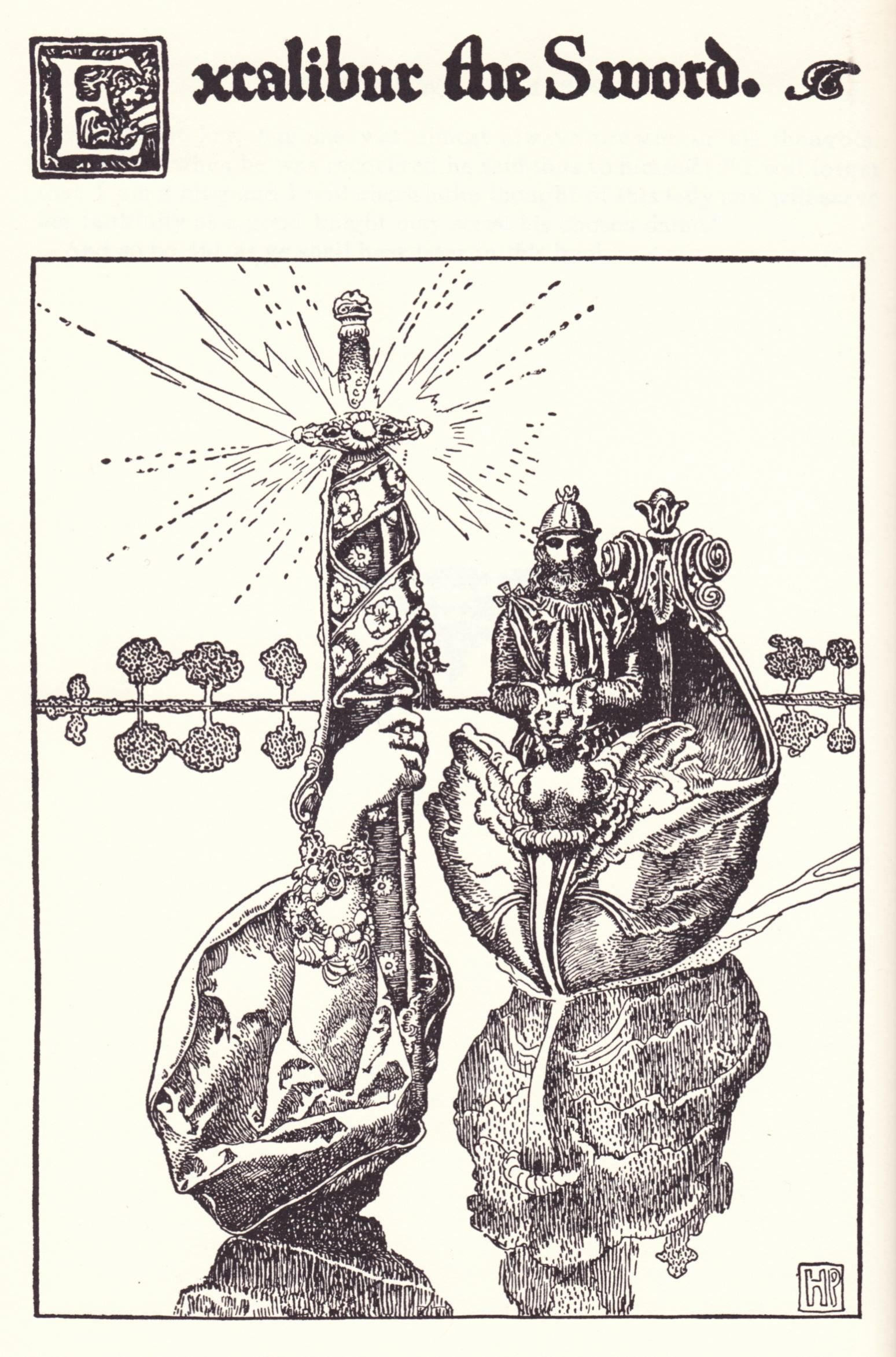
"Excalibur the Sword" Illustration of Arthur receiving it from the Lady of the Lake, by Howard Pyle for The Story of King Arthur and his Knights.

In the legend of King Arthur, the king himself is related to two magical swords, in most variants. The first is the Sword In the Stone. Only Arthur could draw it out, thereby proving that he is the rightful king. In some tales, this is his only sword. In most variants, this sword was then broken, and he receives from The Lady of the Lake a new sword called Excalibur, arguably the most famous of magic swords. Caliburn was the original name of Excalibur. In Welsh legend, Arthur's sword is known as Caledfwlch.

Geoffrey of Monmouth's History of the Kings of Britain is the first non-Welsh source to speak of the sword. Geoffrey says the sword was forged in Avalon and Latinises the name "Caledfwlch" as Caliburnus. When his influential pseudo-history made it to Continental Europe, writers altered the name further until it finally took on the popular form Excalibur. However, in other variants Excalibur itself is the sword in the stone. It is not clear from the various accounts of the Arthur legend whether Excalibur itself was possessed of magical powers or merely had a magical origin, though its scabbard protected its bearer from physical harm. Many interpretations of the legend appear to endow Excalibur with a cutting strength and durability beyond that of ordinary weapons.

In Wolfram Von Echenbach's Parzival, the eponymous hero is given a sword by the Grail king, Anfortas. Parzival's cousin explains that "“The sword will withstand the first blow unscathed; at the second it will shatter. If you then take it back to the spring, it will become whole again from the flow of the water. You must have the water at the source…If the pieces are not lost and you fit them together properly, as soon as the spring water wets them, the sword will become whole again, the joinings and edges stronger than before.”

=== Chinese ===
Ancient Chinese mythology relates the tale of Lü Dongbin, who "slew dragons" with a magic sword and performed "freak feats" with it.

=== Germanic ===
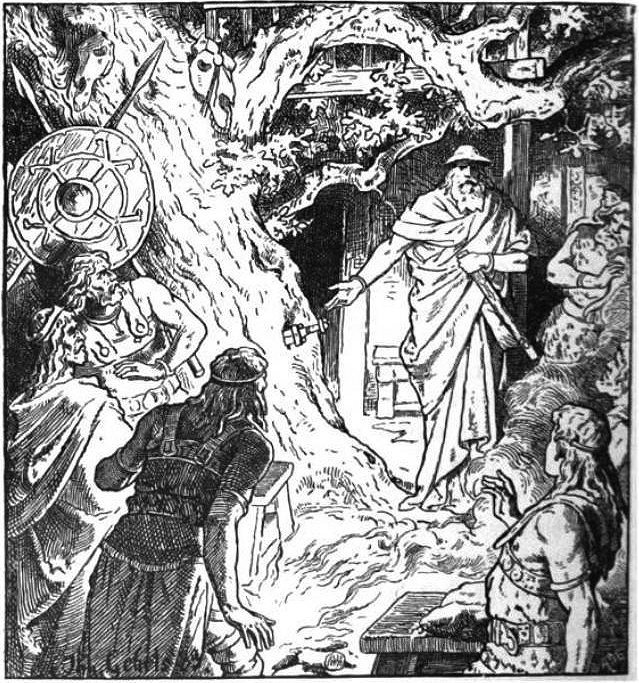
"Sigmund's Sword" (1889) by Johannes Gehrts.

In Norse mythology, the god Frey "possessed a magic sword that struck out at Jotuns of its own accord". Many other swords appear in Norse legend in the hands of heroes.

Tyrfing appears in the Hervarar Saga. Svafrlami was the King of Gardariki, and a grandson of the god Odin. He caught the dwarves, Dvalin and Durin, and forced them to forge a sword with a golden hilt that would never miss a stroke, would never rust and would cut through stone and iron as easily as through clothes. The dwarves made the sword, and it shone and gleamed like fire. However, in revenge they cursed it so that it would kill a man every time it was used and that it would be the cause of three great evils. They also cursed it so that it would kill Svafrlami himself. It would cost the life of not only Svafrlami, but also the life of the Swedish hero Hjalmar.

A similar sword to Tyrfing is Dáinsleif, a sword from the legend of the eternal battle Hjaðningavíg, made by the dwarf Dáin. Like Tyrfing, Dainsleif gave wounds that never healed and could not be unsheathed without killing a man. There is also Mistilteinn, a sword from the Hrómundar saga Gripssonar, which could never go blunt and which Hrómund won from the undead witch-king Þrainn. Like Tyrfing, it was taken from a barrow-wight.

The various iterations of the story of the Völsungs include several magic swords. The first magical sword which enters the story is Gram (="wrath"), stuck by Odin into the tree Barnstokkr in the hall of the Völsungs. Only Sigmund could pull it out. This caused considerable envy and conflict. Eventually, Sigmund fought Odin disguised as an old man, and Odin shattered the sword. Sigmund left it for his son Sigurd, who reforged it to kill Fafnir. In the Nibelungenlied, Sîfrit (the Middle High German version of "Siegfried," the equivalent to Norse Sigurd) discarded Gram in exchange for another magic sword, Balmung ("destruction").

The legendary smith Wayland Smith forged the magic sword Mimung, which appears both in the Anglo-Saxon poem Waldere and in the German/Scandinavian Þiðrekssaga.

Beowulf wielded the sword Hrunting that was according to the poem annealed in venom. The sword was useless against Grendel's Mother. In desperation Beowulf grabbed a giant sword of great age and with it took off the head of the she-monster.

=== Japanese ===
In Japanese mythology, there is a magical sword called Kusanagi, which was one of the three crown jewels given to the Emperor Jimmu by the goddess Amaterasu. Additionally, the katana forged by Masamune and Muramasa were reputedly of such high quality as to be near-magical. In the case of the Masamune and Muramasa blades, it was believed that some element of the smith's personality was imputed into the blade. These three swords have been used extensively in popular culture since then, especially in the realm of video game RPGs. Despite legends about Nihontō, those three are the most famous. Excellent Japanese swords often received nicknames reflecting their cutting prowess. Also, unlike other magical swords, they exist (or still exist). There is, for example, 10 or 11 blades attributed to Masamune who still exist today, such as Kanze Masamune, Kotegiri Masamune or Musashi Masamune.

=== Spain ===
In Spanish legends, two magic swords belonged to the warrior Rodrigo Díaz de Vivar, "El Cid", according to the medieval epical poem "Cantar del mio Cid". The first, "Tizona", had a personality of its own, and its strength varied according to the person who used it. "Colada", too, had power only in the hands of a brave warrior.

=== France ===
In the Matter of France, Roland possessed an indestructible sword, Durendal, which he threw into a poisoned stream to prevent its capture. Durendal was one of a set of three swords supposedly forged by Wayland and provided as ransom for a Norse captive, the other two being variously Bishop Turpin's sword Almace, Charlemagne's Joyeuse, or Ogier's sword Curtana.

=== Other ===
In the English or Scottish medieval epic poem Greysteil, the hero uses a magic sword 'Egeking' which was made in the Far East. In the Norman Kingdom of Sicily we find 'Mikalis,' the magical sword of King Roger II.

== Written fiction ==
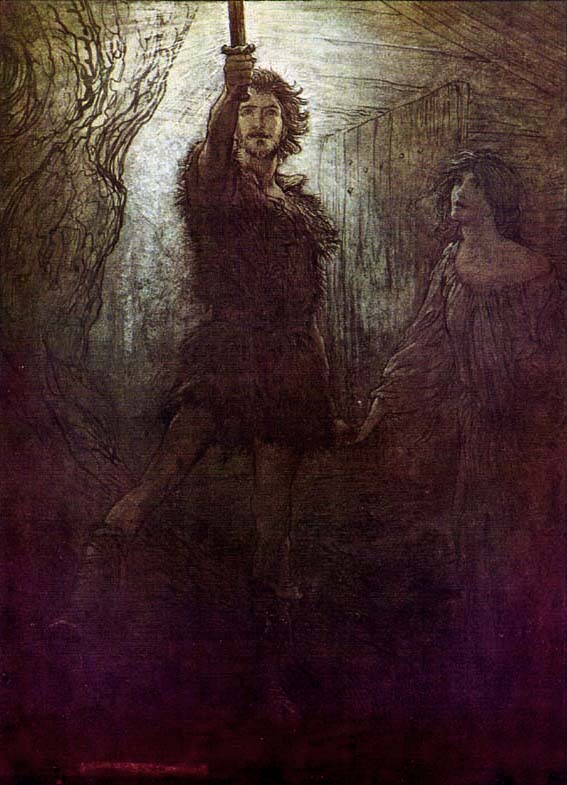
Illustration by Arthur Rackham to Richard Wagner's Die Walküre: the magic sword Nothung.

Edmund Spenser's The Faerie Queene features a golden sword called Chrysaor, the personal weapon of Sir Artegal, the Knight of Justice. The sword was given to him by Astræa, who had been holding it since the days when Zeus had used it to battle the Titans. Because it was "Tempred [ sic ] with Adamant", it was described as being able to cleave through anything.

In Der Ring des Nibelungen, Richard Wagner drew on the legend of Gram for the sword Nothung, belonging to the hero Siegmund and later reforged by his son Siegfried and used by him to kill Fafner. It is finally used by Siegfried to shatter the spear of his grandfather, the God Wotan, thus ending his power.

The hero of Lewis Carroll's poem "Jabberwocky" slays the Jabberwock with a vorpal sword. Although the poem does not define the word "vorpal" (and contains many nonsensical words with no meaning), the term has been adopted in role playing games to describe a sword which possesses a magical ability to decapitate those against whom it is wielded.

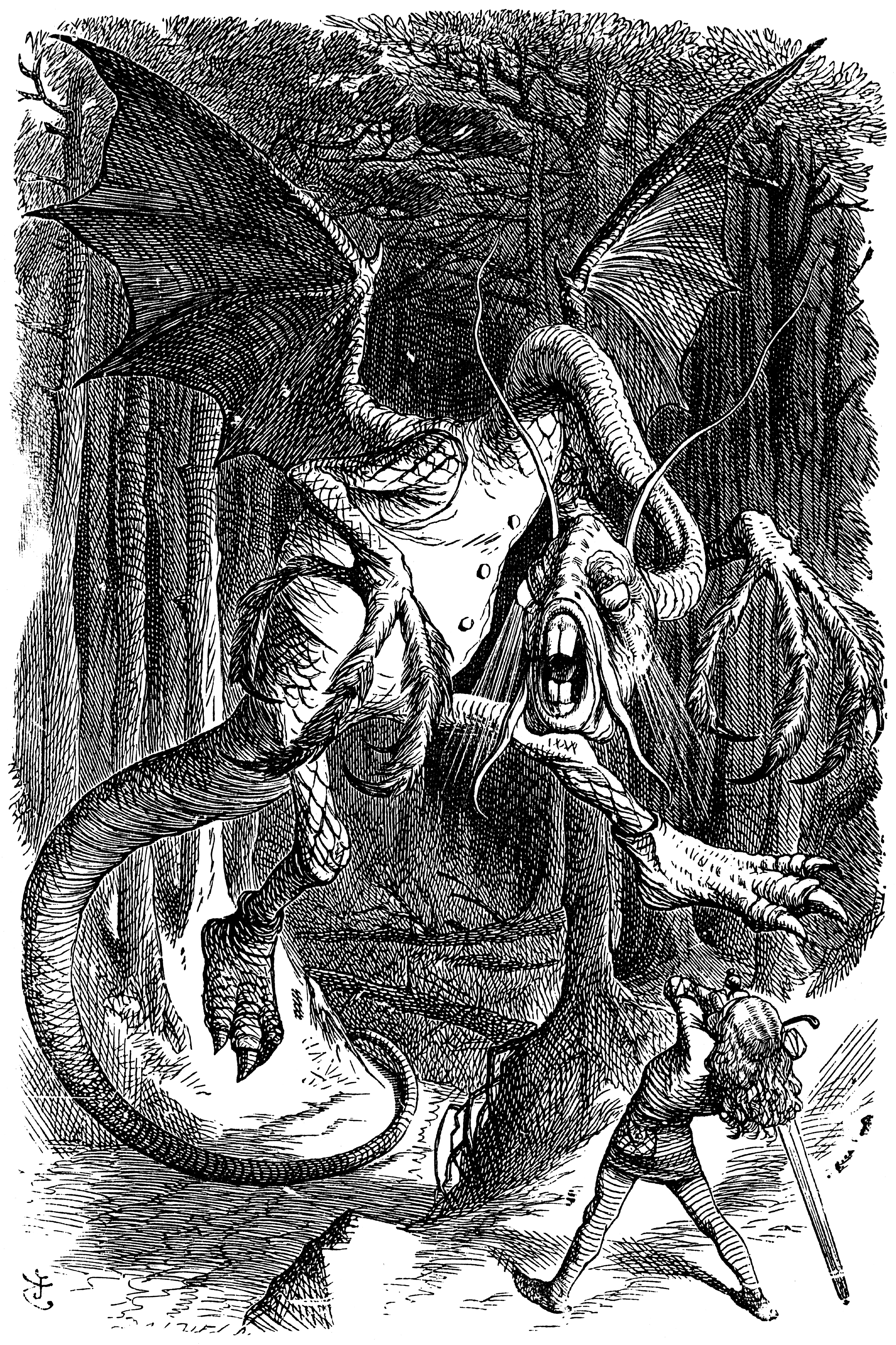
Illustration of the poem "Jabberwocky" featuring the vorpal sword.

In the works of J. R. R. Tolkien such as The Lord of the Rings, many magical swords, usually with powers for good, are wielded by important characters. Gandalf uses his sword Glamdring in his battle with the Balrog, which wields its own sword of flame. Glamdring's sister blade, Orcrist, is buried with Thorin Oakenshield under the Lonely Mountain in The Hobbit. Bilbo, Frodo and Samwise carry the sword Sting. It and Glamdring both glow blue when orcs are near. Aragorn bears the sword Andúril, a potent weapon against the evil of Mordor and a symbol of his right to rule. Turin Turambar, the main character of The Children of Húrin, wields the sword Gurthang. He eventually kills himself using the sword, which speaks to him before he dies, telling him it will kill him. This story is based on the Finnish hero Kullervo, whose sword also agreed to kill him. In addition, in Farmer Giles of Ham, the protagonist is given and wields a magic sword named Caudimordax which, in the story, is translated to mean "Tailbiter".

Hal Foster's Prince Valiant wields the Singing Sword, which makes its bearer undefeatable if he fights for a good cause.

In Margaret Weis and Tracy Hickman's Darksword series the Darksword is a sword capable of absorbing magic.

Michael Moorcock created a sinister magic sword in Stormbringer, wielded by Elric of Melniboné. This black sword has the power to suck out the souls of its victims and transfer their energy to its holder. It also appears to have a mind of its own, sometimes striking against its "master's" will. Mercedes Lackey's creation, the sword Need is similarly independent, although along less sinister lines.

The Twelve Swords of Power are the primary plot device in Fred Saberhagen's Books of the Swords.

Lawrence Watt-Evans's The Misenchanted Sword (1985) involves the difficulties of dealing with the sword of the title; the protagonist must kill a man when he draws it, can only kill one, will die if he ever kills a hundred men with it – and will not die without killing them, but will ceaselessly age.

The Blue Sword contains a blue sword, known as Gonturan, that is both a symbol of power (as it can only be used by a damalur-sol, a woman hero), an amplifier of magic and a very sharp sword. It is also a sword with a mind of its own.

In Robert Jordan's The Wheel of Time is the sword Callandor, which is actually not a sword, but a powerful sa'angreal shaped as a sword and made out of crystal. It is kept within the Stone of Tear. It can only be taken by the Dragon and is a major sign of his return. Until he takes it the Stone of Tear will never fall to any invaders, but when the sword is taken the Stone is said to fall to the People of the Dragon. It is later revealed that unlike other Sa'angreals it does not have the safety mechanism that prevents a wielder from absorbing too much of the One Power through it.

Terry Goodkind's series is named for its magical weapon, the Sword of Truth. This blade, with the word "Truth" inlaid into the handle, factors into many of the moral decisions made by Richard Rahl, the series' protagonist. The blade, like most magic in the series, is focused on need. The sword's master is referred to as the Seeker of Truth. The Seeker gains the swordmastery of all those that have wielded the blade previously. Many false Seekers have carried the sword, but a true Seeker can only be named by the First Wizard (Rahl is named by his grandfather, Zeddicus Zorander). A true Seeker has the ability to turn the blade white when he kills in compassion and forgiveness. Richard has done this twice. Once, killing the Mord-Sith which captured him in Wizard's First Rule, and again to kill a Sister of the Dark in Stone of Tears.

The eponymous sword from The Sword of Shannara series, by Terry Brooks, has a distinctive pommel in the form of the druidic symbol from the series: a hand holding aloft a torch (similar to the Statue of Liberty). Otherwise it is visually unremarkable, though very well made and unworn. Its ability lies in revealing absolute truth, which can be difficult to bear. The sentiment of the enchantment follows that of the "To thine own self be true..." advice to Laertes. A prospective wielder, upon drawing the blade for the first time, is made to confront all their personal flaws, shortcomings, fears, delusions and morally questionable acts. If the being's psyche cannot deal with the revelations, they might not be permanently harmed, but the blade is unusable to them. However, if they can accept the truth of themselves, though it is still a jarring experience, they come out of it wiser for the self-knowledge. Also, they are able to wield the Sword as both a particularly strong and sharp weapon, and as a harsh mirror of Truth to those touched by the blade. This exposure to reality, like many years of counseling condensed into a moment, can actually destroy anyone "evil" enough, e.g. the Warlock Lord of the same book. It also can reveal illusions and give some protection from magical effects.

Also of note is the sword Nightblood from the book Warbreaker. Nightblood is a sentient sword which was given a direction when awakened. This direction was to 'destroy evil.' However, being a sword, Nightblood could not judge right and wrong and killed almost indiscriminately. Simply undoing the clasp (which was extraordinarily tempting for one without a pure heart) was enough for nightblood to utterly destroy the one holding it. Nightblood was often recovered by Vasher sticking clean through a man, not even unsheathed. Nightblood, when fully drawn consumed Its user's BioChromatic breaths at an alarming rate, while sending tendrils of darkness out to destroy anything the sword deemed 'evil.' The sword could also telepathically communicate with its wielder, often asking questions such as "Hello, would you like to kill someone today?" or alternatively asking to be unsheathed.

The Harry Potter series of novels by J.K. Rowling features the Sword of Gryffindor, which is used by several of the book's prominent characters. The sword is an indestructible weapon crafted from goblin metal, the properties of which allow the sword to absorb any substance into itself that will make it stronger, in the case of the books, the immensely deadly venom of a basilisk.

In series: The Dancing Gods, by Jack L. Chalker, the protagonist, the barbarian Joe, is given "The last unnamed magical sword in Husaquahr". In order for the sword to bond with Joe, he has to give it a name, preferably something heroic. However Joe names the sword "Irving" after his son. In response to the exclamations concerning his choice of name, he states "...but I like the name Irving". Once bonded, the sword will fight for no other user, and will return to Joe if he calls it.

The Sword of Baldanders is among the swords featured in Akita Yoshinobu's Sorcerous Stabber Orphen series. Being used for transforming a Killing Doll into a humanlike body, transformations of males into females and transformations of humans into beasts.

== Movies and television ==
Movies and television across varying genres depict swords with magical qualities.

- In the Star Wars saga, which employs many themes of classical mythology, the lightsaber can be seen as a science fiction with a mythological analogue of the magic swords of myth. The device appears to defy the laws of modern technology, however studies and experiments by scientists indicate the technology to be possible in the future. Within the Star Wars universe, lightsabers are made by their wielder as part of the training to become a Jedi knight. During the early development of Star Wars, creator George Lucas called the weapons "lazer swords".
- In the movie The Golden Blade (1952), the Sword of Damaskus, which can cut anything and makes its wielder invincible, is used by Harun Al-Rashid (Rock Hudson) to free a fairy-tale Baghdad from Jafar, a usurper of the throne.
- The Masters of the Universe franchise more directly mixes magic and technology, with the titular hero deriving his power from the Power Sword.
- in the Masters of the Universe spinoff shows the 1985 She-Ra: Princess of Power and the 2018 She-Ra and the Princesses of Power the protagonist Adora uses the Sword of Protection to transform into the titular form, She-Ra.
- In the British television series Robin of Sherwood, Robin Hood carries Albion, one of the seven swords of Wayland. The sword's powers include providing visions to its bearer. It cannot hurt its master.
- The Sword of Omens in the ThunderCats animated series possesses magical powers and the Eye of Thundera in the hilt. Another sword, the Sword of Plun-Darr, was a key element to the plot of certain episodes.
- In the Samurai Jack animated series, the father of the titular hero gave his son a katana from the gods to defeat the evil Aku. Only this magic katana could harm Aku, although it could not kill him completely. This magic sword would obey only its rightful owner, making it impossible to hurt Jack when his enemy wields it. The sword was forged of the pure spirit of good that humans possess, extracted from Jack's father.
- In the animated series Thundarr the Barbarian the main character Thundarr wields the lightsaber-like sun sword.
- In the South Park episode "Make Love, Not Warcraft", the story contains a powerful sword referred to as "The Sword of A Thousand Truths".
- The Sword of Triton: Blackbeard's sword, later wielded by Hector Barbossa with magical properties that first appears in the 2011 film Pirates of the Caribbean: On Stranger Tides. According to the film's visual guide, the Sword of Triton was forged in the lost city of Atlantis as well as commands and channels unearthly and mystical power that brings dead matter to life. The Pirates of the Caribbean Online website states that the sword was forged by the sea deity Triton himself and that it has passed from one ancient mariner to another until falling into Blackbeard's possession. In On Stranger Tides, Blackbeard uses the sword to ensnare the mutinous crew of the Queen Anne's Revenge by the ship's ropes and unleash Greek fire upon mermaids at Whitecap Bay. It is revealed that Blackbeard attacked the Black Pearl, which led Barbossa to claim Blackbeard's ship and sword. Barbossa used the sword's magical properties to control the wind, as well as the ship's rigging, and sailed the Revenge to Tortuga. In the 2017 sequel Dead Men Tell No Tales, it is revealed that the Black Pearl was trapped in the bottle "five winters" earlier before Barbossa stabs the bottle with the sword, restoring the miniaturized Pearl to its original size. Although it was not clarified onscreen, Terry Rossio's unproduced screenplay for Dead Men Tell No Tales reveals the sword's powers comes from Rhysis, one of the three Pearls of Neptune, which was hidden inside the sapphire that was embedded into the hilt of the Sword. The Pearl rules the winds of the ocean, and everything associated with the wind, including the ships at sea, their rigging and sails.
- In The Librarian, Excalibur, which appears in both the films and the television series, is shown as having been infused with magic by Merlin, giving it the ability to be summoned across vast distances and fight independently of its wielder. The sword primarily serves as a personal trainer and protector of the Library, working alongside Librarian Flynn Carsen, who gives it the nickname "Cal". In the first two episodes of The Librarians ("And The Crown of King Arthur" and "And The Sword In the Stone"), the sword is stolen by the Serpent Brotherhood, who use it to mortally wound Flynn. They then take it to the stone where it was originally forged, combining the two to steal Excalibur's magic and release it into the world. Flynn and his team manage to defeat the Brotherhood, but both he and Excalibur die of their injuries soon after. Cassandra, the Librarian responsible for these events, uses what little magic she can gather to heal them instead of herself. Excalibur makes a final appearance in the episode "And The Final Curtain", where Flynn's Guardian, Eve Baird, receives it from the Lady of the Lake. Flynn then uses it to destroy the staff of Prospero, who is subsequently erased from existence.

== Anime ==
- In Arifureta: From Commonplace to World's Strongest, the main protagonist, Hajime Nagumo, an alchemist crafted Tsumehirameki a magical replica of Kogarasumaru a famous Japanese sword which he gave to his lover Shizuku.
- The manga and subsequent anime Bleach features several magic swords, called zanpakuto ("soul-cutting swords"). These katana-like weapons are a representation of the power of the Shinigami (called "Soul Reapers" in the English translation) within the Bleach universe, and essentially - "come from within". As such, zanpakuto can grow in strength and power in tandem with its user. These swords are often personified in a humanoid form throughout the series. All zanpakuto have unique and often poetic Japanese names, such as Ichigo Kurosaki's zanpakuto called Zangetsu, which means Moon-Cutter. All zanpakuto have personalities, emotions and feelings of their own, and it is stated that in order to use the true powers of their zanpakuto (bankai, "final release"), the Shinigami wielder must conquer (master) them through training and battle - essentially forcing a part of themselves (their own power) into submission.
- In Rave Master, Haru's sword, "Decaforce Sword" is a kind of magic sword powered by Rave stones. It is used by Haru to destroy Dark stones.
- In Naruto, another Japanese manga series, based heavily on traditional folklore themes, the legendary grasscutter Kusanagi-no tsurugi makes an entrance. The sword used to be in the possession of the snake Sannin Orochimaru, as the poisonous blade complements the ninja's affinity to summoned snakes. Its counterpart is said to be the sword Totsuka, a sword wielded by the god Susanoo, capable of sealing everything it touches into a pure state of peaceful entrapment.
- Gourry Gabriev of the anime and manga The Slayers is a knight who wields the Sword of Light, a sword with a magical blade of pure light.
- In YuYu Hakusho, Kuwabara Kazuma wields his "spirit power" as a "spirit sword," a lightsaber-like energy blade coming from a wooden handle made from a broken wooden sword tip. His power was later enhanced by a magical handle.
- In the various Tenchi Muyo! media, the main character, Tenchi Masaki, gains the power of a legendary lightsaber-like weapon that accompanies a pair of energy wings that are his inherent power. Another character, Ryoko, has the ability to create a red energy blade.
- In the manga and anime videos Ogre Slayer, the main character has no name and is known by the name of his sword, Onikirimaru or ogre-slayer. The sword enables him to track and kill ogres.
- In InuYasha both the titular character InuYasha and his half-brother Sesshomaru wield magical blades created by their Inugami father's fangs, and there are many other magical swords and weapons in the series mostly gaining power from the energy of the wielder.
- In the anime and manga Reborn! the 10th Vongola Rain Guardian Takeshi Yamamoto and Varia Rain Guardian Superbi Squalo use a swords. Yamamoto uses Shigure Kintoki which was given to him by his father. Squalo uses Arm-Mounted Sword.
- In Highschool DxD there exist legendary magic swords of either Divine or Demonic origins, each having supernatural powers and abilities were wielded by historical figures such as King Arthur's Excalibur, Roland's Durandal and Siegfired's Gram.

== Video and role-playing games ==
Video games and fantasy role-playing games feature a great variety of magical armaments, most commonly represented by swords and similar archetypal weapons. These swords are rarely unique, and in many role-playing scenarios, magical weapons are so ubiquitous that the player characters are expected to come into possession of them as a matter of course.

- The Fire Emblem series regularly features magical swords that can only be used by the main protagonists of a given entry of the series, the most notable of which is called Falchion, a blade forged from a fang from the divine dragon Naga. This sword's properties include the ability to heal its wielder, inflict increased damage against dragons, and kill the final bosses of the games that it has appeared.
- Heavenly Sword features a sword by the same name wielded by the protagonist Nariko that changes into two chained blades, two short swords or a single two handed sword.
- The Legend of Zelda games feature many magic swords, the most famous of which is the Master Sword, the legendary Blade of Evil's Bane that has appeared in most of the games in the series since its first appearance in The Legend of Zelda: A Link to the Past. The Master Sword was forged by the gods and possesses many mystical abilities such as the power to repel, seal, or smite evil, and protect its user from certain types of magic. The Master Sword can only be wielded by someone with great courage, and Link and his various incarnations usually must prove themselves in order to wield the blade or unlock its true powers. In The Legend of Zelda: Skyward Sword, it is revealed that the Master Sword contains a sentient spirit named Fi whose soul was imparted into the blade by the Goddess Hylia before she gave up her divinity in order to reincarnate into the mortal Princess Zelda.
  - In The Legend of Zelda: The Minish Cap the Picori Blade is re-forged into the legendary Four Sword, a magical blade that can allow its user to split into four copies.
  - In The Legend of Zelda: Phantom Hourglass, the ultimate weapon is the Phantom Sword and in The Legend of Zelda: Spirit Tracks it is the Lokomo Sword.
- The Legacy of Kain series features a powerful blade called Soul Reaver, which is used to devour souls of its victims.
- In the Soul series, the plot focuses on two magic weapons: an evil, soul-devouring sword named Soul Edge and its holy counterpart, Soul Calibur.
- The "Blades of Chaos" are a pair of divine blades forged in the fire of Hades in God of War. The series also contains the Blade of Artemis and the Blade of Olympus. Both are divine weapons used by gods to defeat the Titans in the Titanomachy.
- In the Prince of Persia trilogy, there is a blade called the Dagger of Time, which gives its wielder many time-based powers.
- In Riviera: The Promised Land, the lead character, Ein, wields a sword called the Einherjar, in exchange of losing his wings. The sword is called by other in-game characters as a Diviner, or a weapon owned by Grim Angels, capable of vanquishing demons.
- In Super Mario RPG: Legend of the Seven Stars and for the Switch remake, the secondary antagonist of the game is Exor, a magical sword that is part of the Smithy gang, which destroys the Star Road and lands into Bowser’s Castle, blasting Mario, Bowser, and Princess Peach away.
- In SaGa Frontier, Sun Sword is the strongest sword in the game made of the energy of the sun and is only available to use by the player by using Light Magic to summon it.
- The Ultima series features many magical swords, the most notable and powerful being the Black Sword, which contains the powers of a demon.
- In Grand Chase, the weapon of Ronan's 4th job is called Tyrfing. Named after the Norse Mythology sword Tyrfing.
- In Warcraft III, Frostmourne is the Lich King's sword used to steal Prince Arthas' soul.
- In The Elder Scrolls series it is possible to find, and create, enchanted swords that do magical damage, absorb attributes and even capture an enemy's soul. Some of the unique artifacts common to several games take the shape of swords. The most notable is Umbra, which has a soul of its own and over time takes over the personality of its wielder.
- In Final Fantasy XI almost every legendary sword listed is an obtainable weapon from Excalibur to Joyeuse.

== See also ==
- List of magical weapons
- Magic in fiction
- Sentient weapon
