= The Book of Saberhagen =

1975 collection of short stories and articles by Fred Saberhagen

- Cover of 1st edition
- Author: Fred Saberhagen
- Illustrator: Jack Gaughan
- Cover artist: Jack Gaughan
- Language: English
- Series: Book of ... series
- Genre: Science fiction
- Publisher: DAW Books
- Publication date: 1975
- Publication place: United States
- Media type: Print (paperback)
- Pages: 172
- ISBN: 0-87997-153-3
- OCLC: 1413849
- Preceded by: The Book of Fritz Leiber
- Followed by: The Book of Poul Anderson

The Book of Saberhagen is a collection of science fiction short stories by American author Fred Saberhagen. It was first published in paperback by DAW Books in January 1975 as the eighth volume in its Book of ... series.

== Summary ==
The collection consists of ten short works of fiction and a foreword, together with brief forewords to each story, by the author; the book includes a frontispiece by artist Jack Gaughan.

== Contents ==
- "First a Word from the Author ..."
- "The Long Way Home" (short story, 1961)
- "Planeteer" (novelette, 1961)
- "Volume PAA-PYX" (short story, 1961)
- "Seven Doors to Education" (short story, 1961)
- "Deep Space" (short story, 1975)
- "Pressure" (Berserker series) (short story, 1967)
- "Starsong" (Berserker series) (short story, 1968)
- "Calendars" (short story, 974)
- "Young Girl at an Open Half-Door" (short story, 1968)
- "WHAT DO YOU WANT ME TO DO TO PROVE IM HUMAN STOP" (Berserker series) (short story, 1974)

== Reception ==
Spider Robinson in Galaxy Science Fiction notes that "Saberhagen is a fine writer, largely and correctly famous for his Berserker cycle ... [b]ut only two [sic; three] of the ten tales in The Book of Saberhagen are about the Berserkers (two of the best in the series, incidentally)." Of the other stories, he notes that they "vary from fair to excellent, touching all bases in between." He singles out "Deep Space" as "an old favorite of mine" and "Starsong" as "particularly outstanding, a very short story that somehow manages to leave you with the impression that you've just read a novelette." He sums up the collection as "recommended for all Saberhagen fans, and especially for those who don't know him yet."
