= Berserker (novel series) =

Series of science fiction novels by Fred Saberhagen

- First edition, first book in series
- Author: Fred Saberhagen
- Cover artist: Richard M. Powers
- Language: English
- Genre: Science fiction
- Publisher: Ballantine '67, Penguin '70/'85 (UK), Ace '78/'79/'80/'84/'92
- Publication place: United States
- Media type: Print (hardback & paperback)
- ISBN: 0-441-05495-1

The Berserker series is a series of space opera science fiction short stories and novels by Fred Saberhagen, in which robotic self-replicating machines strive to destroy all life.

These Berserkers, named after the human berserker warriors of Norse legend, are doomsday weapons left over from an interstellar war between two races of extraterrestrials. They all have machine intelligence, and their sizes range from that of an asteroid, in the case of an automated repair and construction base, down to human size (and shape) or smaller. The Berserkers' bases are capable of manufacturing more and deadlier Berserkers as the need arises. The Berserker hypothesis, formed as a possible solution to the Fermi paradox, takes its name from the series.

The Berserker stories (published as novels and short stories) depict the fight between Berserkers and the sentient species of the Milky Way Galaxy: Homo sapiens (referred to as "Earth-descended" or "ED" humans, or as "Solarians") which is the only sentient species aggressive enough to counter Berserkers.

== First appearances ==
The first story, "Without a Thought" (originally published as "Fortress Ship") (1963), is a puzzle story, whose protagonist must find a way to simulate intelligence to fool an enemy trying to determine whether there was any conscious being present in a spaceship.

Saberhagen came up with the Berserker as the rationale for the story on the spur of the moment, but the basic concept was so fruitful, with so many possible ramifications, that he used it as the basis of many stories. A common theme in the stories is of how the apparent weaknesses and inconsistencies of living beings are actually the strengths that bring about the killer machines' eventual defeat.

The second story, "Goodlife" (1963), introduces human traitors or collaborators who cooperate with the Berserker machines to stay alive for a little longer.

== Influence ==
Saberhagen's Berserkers have been cited as a possible explanation of the Fermi paradox, which wonders where all the alien life is in a universe so vast. Saberhagen's concept has been dubbed the Berserker hypothesis. It suggests that a particularly paranoid intelligent species would feel compelled to exterminate any peers it detects in the universe. David Brin summarized Saberhagen's solution, "We would not have detected extra-terrestrial radio traffic - nor would any ETIS (extra-terrestrial intelligent species) have ever settled on Earth - because all were killed shortly after discovering radio." The Berserker hypothesis, formed as a possible solution to the Fermi paradox, takes its name from the series.

== Backstory ==
The original Berserkers were designed and built as an ultimate weapon, by a race now known only as the Builders, to wipe out their rivals, the Red Race, in a war which took place at a time corresponding to Earth's Paleolithic era. The Builders failed to ensure their own immunity from Berserker attack, or they lost those safeguards through an unknown malfunction that changed the Berserker programming, and they were exterminated by their own creation very shortly after the demise of the Red Race. The Berserkers then set out across the galaxy to fulfill their core programmed imperative, which is now, simply, to destroy all life wherever they can find it.

== List of species ==
The Berserker stories features many different characters originating from many different species, human and alien. These include:

=== Berserkers ===
The Berserkers are intelligent machines, created by an organic race in the past, as a doomsday weapon, a group of robots with one goal: to destroy all organic life. They turned on their own creators, wiping them out.

The Berserker brain is based on the decay of radioactive elements, to enable their moves to be unpredictable in the event that some race should ever 'crack their source code' and be able to predict perfectly their battle strategies. In rare instances, the unpredictable nature of Berserker decision making has actually worked in humans' favor.

Berserkers exist in a multitude of shapes, sizes and forms. The most common Berserkers are large spherical interstellar spacecraft, heavily armed and armored, equipped with self-replicating factories, and capable of producing numerous scout craft, foot soldiers, and other weapons of war.

Little is known of the Berserkers' history other than that they were created to destroy the Red Race, who are now extinct. The creators of the Berserkers are known as the Builders, who were also later destroyed by the Berserkers.

=== The Builders ===
The Builders were a precursor race, of whom little is known other than they created the Berserkers in a genocidal war with the Red Race, which ended in both races' extinction by the Berserkers.

Saberhagen describes the Builders thus:

And of the Builders themselves, their own all-too-effective weapons, the berserkers, had left nothing but a few obscure records—video and voice recordings. Those videos had recorded slender, fine-boned beings, topologically like Solarian humans with the sole visible exception of the eye, which in the Builder species was a single organ, stretching clear across the upper face, with a bright bulging pupil that slid rapidly back and forth.

In most of the ancient Builder graphics, no matter how elegantly enhanced, the berserkers' creators showed as hardly more than stick drawing of orange glowing substance. Now for the first time in history it was plain to Solarian eyes that that orange color and brightness were the result of some kind of clothing, the exposed skin being a dullish yellow where it showed on the face, the four-fingered hands, and across part of the chest.

In Berserker Kill, a few Builders were shown to have survived to the present day in suspended animation.

=== Carmpan ===
The Carmpan are a patient and peaceful species; their culture is one of logic, reason, pacifism, and philosophy. They lend what support they can to the Humans, but in non-martial forms. They are incapable of direct aggression, but they do possess one special power, a telepathic ability to speak to other sentients across the stars, a method of communication that the Berserkers cannot spy on. Their most effective help to ED (Earth Descended) Solarians is the 'Prophecy of Probability' in which they can give information on future events. This prophecy is very taxing and can even cause the death of a Carmpan.

Although their bodies are described as boxy and machine-like, the Carmpan are also a biological lifeform and thus a target for the genocidal programming of the Berserkers. As such, they have allied themselves with the human race against the Berserkers.

The first stories in the series are related by an individual Carmpan, the "3rd Historian", who seeks to chronicle life in the Galaxy and the struggle against the Berserkers.

=== Goodlife ===
The Berserkers are known to cooperate with each other, most of the time. They sometimes spare the lives of human (or other organic) traitors or collaborators, known as "goodlife", who are willing to cooperate to help destroy other lifeforms, and are viewed as useful tools by the Berserkers.

=== Humanity ===
Homo sapiens, referred to as "Earth-descended" or "ED" Humans, or as "Solarians", is the only sentient species aggressive enough to counter Berserkers.

The Berserkers have severely threatened human civilizations and wiped out billions of humans and other more exotic species. The remnants of human civilization have learned to be wily in order to survive. Berserker technology is much more advanced than that of any known human society. The survivors are disparate and lack the ability to act as a united foe to the Berserkers. While ED humans have massed powerful fleets on many occasions, bickering and strife between factions both political and cultural have often blunted the Solarian Armadas' effectiveness, ironically furthering the power of their machine foes, the Berserkers.

=== Qwib-qwib ===
Later stories (e.g. Itself Surprised, by Roger Zelazny, appearing in Berserker Base) involve a “qwibbian-qwibbian-kel”, a last-ditch weapon built too late by the Red Race. Its primary strength is an otherwise unknown kind of quick subspace jump, used as a tactical force multiplier in combat. At least one survived the war and was much later found and repaired by humans. "Qwibbian" means "berserker" in the Red Race's language, and therefore “qwibbian-qwibbian-kel” appears to mean “anti-Berserker berserker”.

=== Red Race ===
The Red Race was another precursor race, of which little is known other than that their extinction was the Builders' purpose in creating the Berserkers millennia ago.

== Adaptations ==
- A board game based on the series was produced by Flying Buffalo Inc in 1982.
- A video game based on the series, Berserker Raids, was created in 1983.
- A comic book adaptation is being created by Fan-Atic Press.
- The play-by-mail game Starweb uses the term "Berserker" with permission of Fred Saberhagen; Saberhagen returned the favor by using a fictionalized Starweb game as a backdrop for the novel Octagon.
- In the video game Mass Effect 2, one of the Quarian Admiralty Ships is called the "Qwib Qwib".

== Related concepts ==
Other examples of science fiction stories containing replicators bent on the destruction of organic life include:

- Cylons, robotic antagonists bent on destroying all humankind.
- "The Doomsday Machine", a Star Trek episode about a planet-eating machine from another galaxy.
- the Festival, a civilization of uploaded minds with strange designs on humanity, in Singularity Sky by Charles Stross.
- the Hypotheticals, intelligent Von Neumann machines with strange designs on Earth, in Spin by Robert Charles Wilson, although the Hypothetical's goal is to save mankind and other sentient species, not destroy them.
- the Inhibitors, in the fiction of Alastair Reynolds: a formerly organic race, completely converted over to machine form, who are non-sapient, and describe themselves as "post-intelligent".
- the Killers, a civilization of self-replicating machines designed to destroy any potential threat to their (possibly long-dead) creators, in The Forge of God and sequel Anvil of Stars by Greg Bear.
- Reapers, machine intelligences bent on the cyclical harvesting of spacefaring organic life, in Mass Effect.
- Necrons, an ancient race of skeleton-like robots in Warhammer 40,000.
- Skynet, an artificial intelligence bent on the destruction of mankind, and its agents the Terminators, in the movie The Terminator and its sequels.
- the Xymos Nanoswarms in Prey by Michael Crichton.
- the (!*!*!), a machine intelligence/civilization bent on the extermination of organic life, from the Bolo universe stories about a fictional type of artificially intelligent super-heavy tank.
- the Replicators of the Stargate universe
- Stargate Universe's season 2 has the Destiny hunted by machines known as Berzerker drones.
- the Claws, self-replicating, self-improving killer robots from the Philip K. Dick story "Second Variety", which were designed by the United Nations following a devastating nuclear war with Russia, and intended to kill any human not wearing a special wristband. The book was adapted into the 1995 film Screamers
- the machines from the board game Legions of Steel. They emerge at the edge of the galaxy, take over planets on which they create factories to replicate themselves and mount attacks on the factions of the Milky Way.
- Berzerk (1981) by Stern Electronics and Robotron: 2084 (1982) by Williams Electronics Games take cues from the novels as players fight robots bent on destroying humanity.

== Bibliography ==
Berserker Bibliography (1963-2005)[Some of the collections (anthologies) have duplicate stories]
| Pub. Date | Name | Lit. Type | Author | Notes | Short Stories |
|---|---|---|---|---|---|
| 1967 | Berserker | Collection | Saberhagen | Fixup that collects the original stories within a connecting framework, the "Report on the Private Archive of the Third Historian". | "Without a Thought" (first appeared as "Fortress Ship" in Worlds of If, Jan 1963); "Goodlife" (first appeared in Worlds of Tomorrow, Dec 1963); "Patron of the Arts" (first appeared in Worlds of If, Aug 1965); "The Peacemaker" (first appeared as "The Lifehater" in Worlds of If, Aug 1964); "Stone Place" (first appeared in Worlds of If, March 1965); "What T and I Did" (first appeared in Worlds of If, April 1965); "Mr. Jester" (first appeared in Worlds of If, Jan 1966); "Masque of the Red Shift" (first appeared in Worlds of If, Nov 1965); "Sign of the Wolf" (first appeared in Worlds of If, May 1965); "In the Temple of Mars" (first appeared in Worlds of If, April 1966); "The Face of the Deep" (first appeared in Worlds of If, Sep 1966) |
| 1969 | Brother Assassin | Novella | Saberhagen | Novella developed into a full-length novel. A shorter version first appeared in Galaxy Science Fiction (1967) | n/a |
| 1975 | Berserker's Planet | Novel | Saberhagen | Full-length novel | n/a |
| 1979 | Berserker Man | Novel | Saberhagen | Full-length novel | n/a |
| 1979 | The Ultimate Enemy | Collection | Saberhagen | Collection of short stories | "The Smile" (first appeared in Algol, Summer/Fall 1977); "Pressure" (first appeared as "Beserkers Prey" in Worlds of If, June 1977); "The Annihilation of Angkor Apeiron" (first appeared in Galaxy, Feb 1977); "Inhuman Error" (first appeared in Analog, Oct 1974). It has also been titled "WHAT DO YOU WANT ME TO DO TO PROVE I'M HUMAN STOP".; "Some events at the Templar Radiant" (first appeared in Destinies, May-Aug, 1979); "Starsong" (first appeared in Worlds of If, Jan 1968); "Smasher" (first appeared in The Magazine of Fantasy & Science Fiction, Aug 1978); "The Game" (first appeared in The Flying Buffalo's Favorite Magazine, May–June 1977); "Wings out of Shadow" (first appeared in Worlds of If, March–April, 1974) |
| 1981 | Berserker Wars | Collection | Saberhagen | Collection of short fiction | "Stone Place" (first appeared in Worlds of If, March 1965); "The Face of the Deep" (first appeared in Worlds of If, Sep 1966); "What T and I Did" (first appeared in Worlds of If, April 1965); "Mr. Jester" (first appeared in Worlds of If, Jan 1966); "The Winged Helmet" (excerpt from Brother Assassin, 1969, a shorter version of which first appeared in Galaxy Science Fiction, 1967); "Starsong" (first appeared in Worlds of If, Jan 1968); "Some events at the Templar Radiant" (first appeared in Destinies, May-Aug, 1979); "Wings out of Shadow" (first appeared in Worlds of If, March–April, 1974); "The Smile" (first appeared in Algol, Summer/Fall 1977); "The Adventure of the Metal Murderer" (first appeared in Omni, Jan 1980 ); "Patron of the Arts" (first appeared in Worlds of If, Aug 1965) |
| 1985 | Berserker Throne | Novel | Saberhagen | Full-length novel | n/a |
| 1985 | Berserker Blue Death | Novel | Saberhagen | Full-length novel | n/a |
| 1985 | Berserker Base | Anthology | Various | Multi-author anthology. With several guest writers. Saberhagen wrote the connecting interludes. | "Prisoners' Base" by Fred Saberhagen; "What Makes us Human" by Stephen Donaldson; "Friends Together" by Fred Saberhagen; "With Friends Like These" by Connie Willis; "The Founts of Sorrow" by Fred Saberhagen; "Itself Surprised" by Roger Zelazny; "The Great Secret" by Fred Saberhagen; "Deathwomb" by Poul Anderson; "Dangerous Dreams" by Fred Saberhagen; "Pilots of the Twilight" by Ed Bryant; "Crossing the Bar" by Fred Saberhagen; "A Teardrop Falls" by Larry Niven; "Berserker Base" by Fred Saberhagen |
| 1987 | Berserker Attack | Collection | Saberhagen | Limited edition collection | "Masque of the Red Shift" (first appeared in Worlds of If, Nov 1965); "In the Temple of Mars" (first appeared in Worlds of If, April 1966); "Brother Berserker" (excerpt from Brother Assassin, 1969, a shorter version of which first appeared in Galaxy Science Fiction, 1967); "Smasher" (first appeared in The Magazine of Fantasy & Science Fiction, Aug 1978) |
| 1991 | Berserker Lies (collection) | Collection | Saberhagen | Collection of short stories | "The Machinery of Lies"; "Masque of the Red Shift" (first appeared in Worlds of If, Nov 1965); "In the Temple of Mars" (first appeared in Worlds of If, April 1966); "Brother Berserker" (excerpt from Brother Assassin, 1969, a shorter version of which first appeared in Galaxy Science Fiction, 1967); "Smasher" (first appeared in The Magazine of Fantasy & Science Fiction, Aug 1978) |
| 1993 | Berserker Kill | Novel | Saberhagen | Full-length novel | n/a |
| 1996 | The Bad Machines | Novelette | Saberhagen | Crossover with Jack Williamson's The Humanoids series. | Appeared in The Williamson Effect tribute anthology, republished in Of Berserkers, Swords and Vampires: A Saberhagen Retrospective in 2009. |
| 1997 | Berserker Fury | Novel | Saberhagen | Full-length novel | n/a |
| 1998 | Shiva in Steel | Novel | Saberhagen | Full-length novel | n/a |
| 2003 | Berserker's Star | Novel | Saberhagen | Full-length novel | n/a |
| 2003 | Berserker Prime | Novel | Saberhagen | Full-length novel | n/a |
| 2005 | Rogue Berserker | Novel | Saberhagen | Full-length novel | n/a |

== See also ==
- Starweb, a game featuring Saberhagen's Berserkers
- "Second Variety"—short story by Philip K. Dick. Self replicating machines have devastated both sides of a world war between East and West.
- List of works by Fred Saberhagen
