= Empire of the East series =

Science fiction/fantasy novels by Fred Saberhagen

The Empire of the East series is a series of four science fantasy novels by American writer Fred Saberhagen.

== Overview ==
Some time in the story's past, a nuclear holocaust is averted by a computer named ARDNEH (Automatic Restoration Director – National Executive Headquarters), which initiates what is intended to be a temporary modification (later called "The Change") to the laws of physics to make nuclear explosions impossible. However, the enemy has a similar device, and when the two expanding wavefronts of The Change collide, the effect unexpectedly becomes permanent.

Following The Change, most technology ceases to function, while magic now works. Magical beings are also created. Demons are born from acts of violence at the time of The Change; the most powerful is Orcus, born of a nuclear bomb caught by a wavefront at the exact moment of exploding. After eliminating potential rivals, it establishes and rules the evil Empire of the East. Eventually, it is tricked and overthrown by John Ominor, its human second-in-command, who then becomes Emperor of the East. However, the tyranny remains the same. Orcus is locked away in a magical dungeon by Ominor and Wood, his most powerful wizard (who goes on to become the main antagonist of the subsequent Swords series set thousands of years further in the future).

On one continent, a resistance movement fights on under the leadership of Duncan, but is gradually being ground down by the greatly superior military and magical strength of the Empire. Rolf, a peasant farmer with an untapped knack for technology, joins the resistance after his parents are killed and his sister kidnapped by soldiers of the Empire. He is contacted by Ardneh (made sentient by The Change and the actual leader of the West), who uses Rolf's technological talents to effect repairs to and enhancements of itself. Rolf obtains a power unit that makes Ardneh much stronger. Ultimately, he becomes the conduit for Ardneh's plans to bring about the West's salvation.

Rolf helps destroy a regional tyrant in The Broken Land by driving a long-lost super-tank. In The Black Mountains, he plays a part in defeating a much more powerful leader, Som the Dead.

In Changeling Earth, the war between East and West comes to a climax. Ardneh helps Orcus escape its prison. Orcus sees its main danger lies with its rescuer, not Ominor, so it attacks Ardneh. They are evenly matched in strength, and neither can kill the other, but Ardneh is immobile. Orcus orders the Eastern armies to converge on and assault the place where Ardneh's hardware is hidden. Duncan's weaker force defends Ardneh, but Ardneh tells Duncan to retreat when the situation becomes hopeless. Ardneh's components are captured piecemeal and destroyed ... which is just what Ardneh has planned. Too late, Orcus realizes its peril and tries to flee, but Ardneh holds it fast. When enough of Ardneh is disabled, The Change is partially undone or weakened. Orcus reverts back to the nuclear explosion that it originally was, destroying the army of the East and killing Ominor.

Written in the 1960s and 1970s, the books have a significant Cold War theme and the parallels between the American perspective of the evil East and the West are obvious. The dominance of magic makes for a strong fantasy flavor, but remnants of the advanced weapons and technology of the old world appear throughout the series (the lake of life for wounded soldiers for example).

Written more than 30 years later, and taking place a thousand years after Rolf lived, Ardneh's Sword tells of how one of Rolf's descendants finds technology that Ardneh created but never used. When this is activated, the Gods who feature in the Swords books are born.

== Novels ==
The series is composed of the following novels:

- The Broken Lands (1968)
- The Black Mountains (1971)
- Changeling Earth (1973), also titled Ardneh's World
- Ardneh's Sword (2006)

The first three books are tightly connected, dealing with the West's struggle to bring down the Empire, in which Rolf plays a vital role. The fourth novel is set much later.

The first three books were substantially re-written and re-issued as an omnibus edition titled Empire of the East in 1979.

== Reception ==
Greg Costikyan reviewed Empire of the East in Ares Magazine #1. Costikyan commented that "in Empire of the East, [Saberhagen] has produced an extremely interesting fantasy work. [...] Empire of the East is extremely cleanly written, moves along rapidly, and is fun."

Tim Cain, the creator of the video game series Fallout, has cited Empire of the East as one of his favorite and most influential books in a video from 2023.

== See also ==
- Books of the Swords, a related Saberhagen series
