= Berserker hypothesis =

Idea that any intelligent life is destroyed by aliens

The Berserker hypothesis, also known as the deadly probes scenario, is the idea that humans have not yet detected intelligent alien life in the universe because it has been systematically destroyed by a series of lethal Von Neumann probes. The hypothesis is named after the Berserker series of novels (1963–2005) written by Fred Saberhagen.

The hypothesis has no single known proposer, and instead is thought to have emerged over time in response to the Hart–Tipler conjecture, the idea that an absence of detectable Von Neumann probes is contrapositive evidence that no intelligent life exists outside of the Solar System. According to the Berserker hypothesis, an absence of such probes is not evidence of life's absence, since interstellar probes could "go berserk" and destroy other civilizations, before self-destructing.

In his 1983 paper "The Great Silence", astronomer David Brin summarized the implications of the Berserker hypothesis: it is entirely compatible with all the facts and logic of the Fermi paradox, but would mean that there exists no intelligent life left to be discovered. In the worst case, humanity has already alerted others to its existence, and is next in line to be destroyed.

There is no need to struggle to suppress the elements of the Drake equation in order to explain the Great Silence, nor need we suggest that no [intelligent aliens] anywhere would bear the cost of interstellar travel. It need only happen once for the results of this scenario to become the equilibrium conditions in the Galaxy. We would not have detected extra-terrestrial radio traffic – nor would any [intelligent aliens] have ever settled on Earth – because all were killed shortly after discovering radio.

— David Brin, "The Great Silence", Quarterly Journal of the Royal Astronomical Society, Vol. 24, No.3, p.283–309 (1983)

== Background ==
There is no reliable or reproducible evidence that aliens have visited Earth. No transmissions or evidence of intelligent life have been observed anywhere other than Earth in the Universe. This runs counter to the knowledge that the Universe is filled with a very large number of planets, some of which likely hold the conditions hospitable for life. Life typically expands until it fills all available niches. These contradictory facts form the basis for the Fermi paradox, of which the Berserker hypothesis is one proposed solution.

=== Sentinel type Berserker ===
In his science fiction novel "The Sentinel", Arthur C. Clarke propose that instead of an advanced civilisation sending a berserker to seek and destroy cosmic civilisations as they emerge past a given stage of development, a sentinel is placed in the vicinity of an emerging civilisation, passively waiting to be discovered by it, once this watched civilisation reaches the specific stage of development that allows it to reach and find it.

In this approach, the placement of the sentinel would determine the target stage at which emerging civilisations should be eliminated; a moon of the home planet, a near-by planet, the edge of the solar system, or the nearest solar system, all entail different levels of technological advancement that the watched civilisation must reach before the sentinel is activated.

== Responses ==
A key component of the hypothesis is that Earth's solar system has not yet been visited by a Berserker probe. In a 2013 analysis by Anders Sandberg and Stuart Armstrong at the Future of Humanity Institute at University of Oxford, they predicted that even a slowly replicated set of Berserker probes, if it were able to destroy civilizations elsewhere, would also very likely have already encountered (and destroyed) humanity.

== Relationship to other proposed Fermi paradox solutions ==
The Berserker hypothesis is distinct from the dark forest hypothesis in that under the latter, many alien civilizations could still exist provided they keep silent. The dark forest hypothesis can be viewed as a special case of the Berserker hypothesis, if the 'deadly Berserker probes' are (e.g. due to resource scarcity) only sent to star systems that show signs of intelligent life.

The Great Filter hypothesis is a more general counterpart to the Berserker hypothesis, which posits that a great event or barrier prevents early-stage extraterrestrial life from developing into intelligent space-faring civilizations. In the Berserker hypothesis framing, the filter would exist between the industrial age and widespread space colonization.

== Berserkers in popular culture ==
In Babylon 5 episode "A Day in the Strife" (1995), a berserker probe approached the Babylon station promising untold technological and medical advancements in return for the crew answering a number of questions, threatening that the probe would explode, destroying the station with it, if they failed.

Having put together the appropriate answers within the deadline, station commander John Sheridan realised the probe was testing them to see if they were advanced enough to pose a threat, and would explode on receiving the correct answers, confirming this. The crew therefore ignored the request and destroyed the probe as it departed, to prevent it fulfilling its mission elsewhere.

In the Star Trek episode "The Changeling" (1967), an altered earth probe is inadvertently given berserker like imperatives to sterilize imperfection, destroying all biological life as it travels back to Earth.

== See also ==
- Grey goo
