= DAW Books's Book of ... series =

The first volume, published in Apr. 1972

The Book of ... is a series of speculative fiction collections originally published in paperback by DAW Books from 1972 to 1976.

== History ==
The series consists of a succession of similarly-titled single-author short story collections, each gathering together representative samples of the short works of a particular authors then prominent in the field. According to John ONeill, DAW editor/publisher Donald A. Wollheim "more or less pioneered the idea" of such a series, first for Ace Books with an occasional series called "The Worlds of [author's name]" (continued sporadically by other editors after he left Ace), and then for DAW with the present sequence. The concept was later taken up and taken further by Ballantine/Del Rey and Pocket Books with their respective "Best of" series, both of them more ambitious than Wollheim's. ONeill notes that "Like most early DAW efforts though, [the "Book of" collections] were slender volumes; they're also not as numerous, and the packaging isn't nearly as attractive as the Del Rey books [in particular], so they aren't as collectible." Wollheim was also not averse to repackaging collections previously issued by other publishers for his series; a few of its volumes were merely new editions, retitled, of such works. But he was also willing to innovate on the single volume per author pattern he had established; in one instance, a featured author (Fritz Leiber) proved popular enough that an additional collection by that author was issued.

== Content ==
The volumes often included a preface or introduction by the author or editor, and in a few instances some material contributed by others. Most volumes also had a frontispiece by artist Jack Gaughan, a frequent contributor of cover and interior art to early DAW publications.

== The series ==
Author, DAW publication number, and publication date follow each title.

- The Book of van Vogt (A. E. van Vogt) (no. 4, Apr. 1972)
- The Book of Brian Aldiss (Brian Aldiss) (no. 29, Nov. 1972)
- The Book of Frank Herbert (Frank Herbert) (no. 39, Jan. 1973)
- The Book of Philip K. Dick (Philip K. Dick) (no. 44, Feb. 1973)
- The Book of Gordon Dickson (Gordon R. Dickson) (no. 55, May 1973)
- The Book of Philip José Farmer (Philip José Farmer) (no. 63, Jul. 1973)
- The Book of Fritz Leiber (Fritz Leiber) (no. 87, Jan. 1974)
- The Book of Saberhagen (Fred Saberhagen) (no. 136, Jan. 1975)
- The Book of Poul Anderson (Poul Anderson) (no. 153, Jun. 1975)
- The Second Book of Fritz Leiber (Fritz Leiber) (no. 164, Sep. 1975)
- The Book of Andre Norton (Andre Norton) (no. 165, Oct. 1975)
- The Book of John Brunner (John Brunner) (no. 177, Jan. 1976)

== Comparable series ==
Of the similar sequences of single author series issued by other publishers, Ace Books's The Worlds of [author's name] series ran from 1966-1983, Ballantine/Del Rey's Best of [author's name] series ran from 1974 to 1988, and Pocket Books's Best of [author's name] series ran from 1976 to 1982.
