= The Book of Fritz Leiber =

1974 collection of short stories and articles by Fritz Leiber

- Cover of 1st edition
- Author: Fritz Leiber
- Illustrator: Jack Gaughan
- Cover artist: Jack Gaughan
- Language: English
- Series: Book of ... series
- Genre: Fantasy, science fiction and horror
- Publisher: DAW Books
- Publication date: 1974
- Publication place: United States
- Media type: Print (paperback)
- Pages: 173
- ISBN: 0-87997-091-X
- OCLC: 1647764
- Preceded by: The Book of Philip José Farmer
- Followed by: The Book of Saberhagen

The Book of Fritz Leiber is a collection of science fiction short stories and articles by American author Fritz Leiber. It was first published in paperback by DAW Books in January 1974 as the seventh volume in its Book of ... series, and was reprinted in November 1976. It was later gathered together with The Second Book of Fritz Leiber into the hardcover omnibus collection The Book of Fritz Leiber, Volume I & II (Gregg Press, 1980). The book has been translated into Italian.

== Summary ==
The book consists of ten fantasy, science fiction and horror short stories alternating with nine related articles, together with a foreword by the author. Some pieces were original to the collection. Others were originally published in the magazines Rogue for January 1963, Worlds of Tomorrow for August 1963, The Magazine of Fantasy and Science Fiction for December 1951 and April 1963, Galaxy Science Fiction for August 1952 and February 1968, and Broadside Magazine for December 1965, and the collection The Dark Brotherhood and Other Pieces (1966).

== Contents ==
- "Foreword"
- "The Spider" (1963)
- "Monsters and Monster Lovers" (1965)
- "A Hitch in Space" (1963)
- "Hottest and Coldest Molecules" (1952)
- "Kindergarten" (1963)
- "Those Wild Alien Words: I" (1974)
- "Crazy Annaoj" (1968)
- "Debunking the I Machine" (1949)
- "When the Last Gods Die" (1951)
- "King Lear" (1934)
- "Yesterday House" (1952)
- "After Such Knowledge"
- "Knight to Move" (1965)
- "Weird World of the Knight" (1960)
- "To Arkham and the Stars" (1966)
- "The Whisperer" Re-examined" (1964)
- "Beauty and the Beasts"
- "Masters of Mace and Magic"
- "Cat's Cradle"

== Awards ==
The book placed fifth in the 1975 Locus Poll Award for Best Single Author Collection.

== Reception ==
P. Schuyler Miller in Analog Science Fiction/Science Fact called "this latest of Donald Wollheim's 'book' collections one of the most interesting he has published." Miller warns the reader "not [to] pass over the book because you have tagged the author as a fantas[is]t with Fafhrd and the Mouser hung 'round his neck. They are here, indeed, but so is much excellent science fiction and so are a number of articles that Isaac Asimov might envy." Following a thorough exploration of the contents, he recommends "[r]ead it; you'll like it. And get someone who never reads science fiction or fantasy to read it, too."

The collection was also reviewed by Ray Ramsay in Journal of the H. P. Lovecraft Society no. 1, 1976, and Mary S. Weinkauf in Delap's F & SF Review, April 1977.
