= The Book of Philip José Farmer =

1973 collection of short stories and articles by Philip José Farmer

- Cover of 1st edition
- Author: Philip José Farmer
- Illustrator: Jack Gaughan
- Cover artist: Jack Gaughan
- Language: English
- Series: Book of ... series
- Genre: Science fiction
- Publisher: DAW Books
- Publication date: 1973
- Publication place: United States
- Media type: Print (paperback)
- Pages: 239
- ISBN: 0-87997-063-4
- OCLC: 1298433
- Preceded by: The Book of Gordon Dickson
- Followed by: The Book of Fritz Leiber

The Book of Philip José Farmer is a collection of science fiction short stories by American author Philip José Farmer. It was first published in paperback by DAW Books in July 1973 as the sixth volume in its Book of ... series. The first British edition was issued in hardcover by The Elmfield Press in July 1976. A revised second edition with partially different content was published in paperback by Berkley Books in February 1982, with a second printing in April of the same year; it was followed by a British edition issued in paperback by Granada in July 1983.

== Summary ==
The first edition consists of seventeen short works of fiction and two essays by the author, together with a foreword and story introductions by the author and an essay on the author and his work by Leslie A. Fiedler; the book includes a frontispiece by artist Jack Gaughan. The second edition replaces the foreword with a preface and three of the short stories with three different short stories, revises and updates the story introductions, and omits the frontispiece.

== Contents ==
- "Foreword" [1st ed. only]
- "Preface" [2nd ed. only]
- "My Sister's Brother" (novella, 1960) [both eds.]
- "Skinburn" (short story, 1972) [both eds.]
- "The Alley Man" (novella, 1959) [both eds.]
- "Father's in the Basement" (short story, 1972) [both eds.]
- "Toward the Beloved City" (novelette, 1972) [both eds.]
- "Polytropical Paramyths" (essay, 1973) [both eds.]
- "Totem and Taboo" (short story, 1954) [1st ed. only]
- "Don't Wash the Carats" (short story, 1968) [both eds.]
- "The Sumerian Oath" (short story, 1972) [both eds.]
- "The Voice of the Sonar in My Vermiform Appendix" (short story, 1971) [1st ed. only]
- "Brass and Gold (or Horse and Zeppelin in Beverly Hills)" (short story, 1971) [1st ed. only]
- "Only Who Can Make a Tree?" (short story, 1971) [both eds.]
- "The Last Rise of Nick Adams" (short story, 1978) [2nd ed. only]
- "The Freshman" (short story, 1979) [2nd ed. only]
- "Uproar in Acheron" (short story, 1961) [2nd ed. only]
- "An Exclusive Interview with Lord Greystoke" (short story, 1972) [both eds.]
- "Sexual Implications of the Charge of the Light Brigade" (short story, 1967) [both eds.]
- "The Obscure Life and Hard Times of Kilgore Trout: A Skirmish in Biography" (short story, 1971) [both eds.]
- "Thanks for the Feast" (essay, 1973) [both eds.]
- "Notes on Philip José Farmer" (Leslie A. Fiedler) (essay, 1972) [both eds.]

== Reception ==
Chris Morgan in The Vector Reviews Supplement calls the collection "a book which does justice to the strengths and weaknesses of Philip Jose Farmer while simultaneously being varied and entertaining." He notes that the novelettes "My Sister's Brother" ("an early story of alien sex") and "The Alley Man" ("a story full of pride and sadness which should have won a Hugo") are "[t]wo of his best." He also discusses the extract from "Riders of the Purple Wage" (Farmer's "notorious Hugo winner"), "Toward The Beloved City" (a "relatively poor novelette" representing an "exploration of the resurrection theme") and the six "polytropical paramyths" ("short, zany fantasies with occasional bursts of satire"), characterized by Farmer as "Marxian tales but" in the manner of "Groucho, Chico and Harpo, not Karl." Morgan finds "The Sumerian Oath" the best of these. In the last section of the book, "[t]he Tarzan interview is a stiff upper lip encounter ... missing out on most of the opportunities for wry humour," the article on Kilgore Trout "is a weird combination of fact and fiction," and Fiedler's article about Farmer "an honest appraisal not without brickbats." In summation, the reviewer feels the book is "a good volume" that "succeeds well" as "a representative collection of Farmer's best work in different areas."

The collection was also reviewed by David G. Hartwell in Locus #153, December 30, 1973, Chris Henderson in Dragon Magazine, May 1982, William J. Collins in Science Fiction & Fantasy Book Review #4, May 1982, and Bill Carlin in Paperback Inferno v. 7, no, 3, 1983.
