= Legions of Steel Scenario Pack 1 =

Legions of Steel Scenario Pack 1 is a 1993 role-playing supplement for Legions of Steel published by Global Games Company.

== Contents ==
Legions of Steel Scenario Pack 1 is a supplement in which additional rules are added to the basic rules of Legions of Steel.

== Reception ==
Ken Carpenter reviewed Legions of Steel Scenario Pack 1 in White Wolf #49 (Nov., 1994), rating it a 5 out of 5 and stated that "What's not to like? Anything under $10 is a bargain in our hobby, and the pack's 12 scenarios alone promise hours of play. Beyond the added background, rules and models, there are hints on tactics, a short story and 66 counters."

== Reviews ==
- Shadis #10
