= The Many Worlds of Poul Anderson =

1974 collection of short stories by Poul Anderson

- first edition of The Many Worlds of Poul Anderson
- Editor: Roger Elwood
- Author: Poul Anderson
- Cover artist: Charles Geer
- Language: English
- Series: Book of ... series
- Genre: Science fiction
- Publisher: Chilton
- Publication date: 1974
- Publication place: United States
- Media type: Print (hardback)
- Pages: 324
- ISBN: 0-8019-5950-0
- Preceded by: The Book of Saberhagen
- Followed by: The Second Book of Fritz Leiber

The Many Worlds of Poul Anderson is a collection of science fiction short stories by American writer Poul Anderson, edited by Roger Elwood, first published in hardcover by Chilton in June 1974. A paperback edition retitled The Book of Poul Anderson followed from DAW Books in June 1975 as the ninth volume in its Book of ... series, and was reprinted in June 1978, December 1978, and October 1983. Most of the pieces were originally published between 1947 and 1971 in the magazines Astounding Science Fiction, The Magazine of Fantasy and Science Fiction, Analog, Riverside Quarterly, and Other Worlds Science Stories. The others are original to the collection.

== Summary ==
The book contains eight short fictions and essays by Anderson and others, two of them co-authored, together with an introduction by the editor.

== Contents ==
- "Foreword' (Roger Elwood)
- "Tomorrow's Children" (novelette) (Poul Anderson and F. N. Waldrop (uncredited))
- "The Queen of Air and Darkness" (novella) (Poul Anderson)
- "Her Strong Enchantments Failing" (essay) (Patrick L. McGuire)
- "Epilogue" (novella) (Poul Anderson)
- "The Longest Voyage" (novelette) (Poul Anderson)
- "Challenge and Response" (essay) (Sandra Miesel)
- "Journeys End" (short story) (Poul Anderson)
- "A World Named Cleopatra" (essay) (Poul Anderson)
- "The Sheriff of Canyon Gulch" (novelette) (Poul Anderson and Gordon R. Dickson)
- "Day of Burning" (novelette) (Poul Anderson)
