= The Book of John Brunner =

1976 collection of short stories and articles by John Brunner

- Cover of 1st edition
- Author: John Brunner
- Illustrator: Jack Gaughan
- Cover artist: Jack Gaughan
- Language: English
- Series: Book of ... series
- Genre: Science fiction
- Publisher: DAW Books
- Publication date: 1976
- Publication place: United States
- Media type: Print (paperback)
- Pages: 159
- ISBN: 0-87997-213-0
- OCLC: 2003553
- Preceded by: The Book of Andre Norton

The Book of John Brunner is a collection of science fiction short stories by British author John Brunner. It was first published in paperback by DAW Books in January 1976 as the twelfth and last volume in its Book of ... series.

== Summary ==
The book consists of various self-selected short works by the author, not all of them in genre, including nine short works of fiction, eleven essays, nine poems, a crossword (and its solution), and three translated works, one a short story by French author Gérard Klein and the others poems by German poet Stefan George, Austrian poet Rainer Maria Rilke, and the ancient Roman poet Decimus Magnus Ausonius, together with an introductory note by the author and a frontispiece by artist Jack Gaughan.

== Contents ==
- "Premumble"
- "Crossword"
- "Limerick No. 1" (poem)
- "A Different Kick, or How to Get High Without Actually Going Into Orbit" (essay, 1965)
- "Lullaby for the Mad Scientist's Daughter" (poem, 1970)
- "Bloodstream" (novelette, 1974)
- "Domestic Crisis 2017" (poem, 1974)
- "Hide and Seek" (translation of Gérard Klein short story "Cache-cache" (1960), 1973)
- "Limerick No. 2" (poem)
- "The Technological Folk Hero: Has He a Future?" (essay, 1972)
- "The Ballad of Teddy Hart" (essay, 1976)
- "Who Steals My Purse" (novelette, 1973)
- "Feghoot I" (short story, 1962)
- "Excerpt from a Social History of the 20th Century" (short story, 1970)
- "Die Spange" (translation of poem by Stefan George)
- "Limerick No. 3" (poem)
- "Them As Can, Does" (essay, 1966)
- "Faithless Jack the Spaceman" (essay)
- "When Gabriel ..." (short story, 1956)
- "What We Have Here" (poem, 1970)
- "Feghoot II" (short story)
- "Limerick No. 4" (poem, 1976)
- "The Spartans' Epitaph at Thermopylae" (essay)
- "The Educational Relevance of Science Fiction" (essay, 1971)
- "The Spacewreck of the Old 97" (essay)
- "Manalive" (short excerpt, 1964 from novel in progress ultimately published as The Days of March (1988))
- "Matthew xviii, 6" (poem, 1971)
- "Feghoot III" (short story)
- "Corrida" (translation of poem (1907) by Rainer Maria Rilke, 1973)
- "Limerick No. 5" (poem)
- "The Evolution of a Science Fiction Writer" (essay, 1972)
- "The H-Bombs' Thunder" (essay, 1958)
- "The New Thing" (short story, 1969)
- "The Atom Bomb Is Twenty-Five This Year" (poem, 1970)
- "Epigrammata LXV" (translation of poem by Decimus Magnus Ausonius)
- "Solution to Crossword"

== Reception ==
The collection was reviewed by W. N. MacPherson in The Science Fiction Review Monthly, January 1976, Joe Sanders in Delap's F & SF Review, April 1976, Thomas J. Murn in Janus, Sept. 1976, Art Metzger in Quantum #2, 1976, Samuel Mines in Luna Monthly #67, Spring 1977, and Annemarie Kindt (in Dutch) in Holland-SF 1978, #3.
