= A Century of Progress (novel) =

1983 novel by Fred Saberhagen

A Century of Progress is a novel by Fred Saberhagen published in 1983.

== Plot summary ==
A Century of Progress is a novel in which Alan Norlund is recruited into a war that involves time travel to the 1930s.

== Reception ==
Greg Costikyan reviewed A Century of Progress in Ares Magazine #16 and commented that "A Century of Progress is based on a good idea which is not adequately exploited. As such, it is one of Saberhagen's lesser novels."

== Reviews ==
- Review by Gene DeWeese (1983) in Science Fiction Review, November 1983
