= The Many Worlds of Andre Norton =

Book by Andre Norton

- Cover of the first edition
- Author: Andre Norton
- Cover artist: Charles Geer
- Language: English
- Series: Book of ... series
- Genre: Fantasy
- Publisher: Chilton
- Publication date: 1974
- Publication place: United States
- Media type: Print (hardcover)
- Pages: 208
- ISBN: 0-8019-5927-6
- Preceded by: The Second Book of Fritz Leiber
- Followed by: The Book of John Brunner

The Many Worlds of Andre Norton is a collection of fantasy and science fantasy short stories by American writer Andre Norton, edited by Roger Elwood. It was first published in August 1974 in simultaneous hardcover editions by Chilton (US) and Thomas Nelson (Canada). A paperback edition, retitled The Book of Andre Norton and omitting the name of the editor, was issued by DAW Books in October 1975 as the eleventh volume in its Book of ... series, and was reprinted in November 1977, July 1981 and September 1987.

== Summary ==
The book collects seven novellas and short stories along with one essay by Norton, with an introduction by Donald A. Wollheim, an essay on Norton by Rick Brooks, and a bibliography of Norton's works as of 1975 by Helen-Jo Jakusz Hewitt. The stories include the Witch World tale "The Toads of Grimmerdale".

== Contents ==
- "Introduction" (Donald A. Wollheim)
- "The Toads of Grimmerdale" (from Flashing Swords! #2, edited by Lin Carter, 1974)
- "London Bridge" (from The Magazine of Fantasy and Science Fiction, v. 45, no. 4, October 1973)
- "On Writing Fantasy" (from Dipple Chronicle, November/December 1971)
- "Mousetrap" (from The Magazine of Fantasy and Science Fiction, v. 6, no. 6, June 1954)
- "All Cats Are Gray" (from Fantastic Universe, v. 1, no. 2, August–September 1953)
- "The Long Night of Waiting" (from The Long Night of Waiting and Other Stories, edited by Roger Elwood, 1974)
- "The Gifts of Asti" (from Fantasy Book, v. 1, no. 3, July 1948)
- "Long Live Lord Kor!" (from Worlds of Fantasy, no. 2, September 1970)
- "Andre Norton: Loss of Faith" (Rick Brooks) (from Dipple Chronicle, November/December 1971)
- "Andre Norton Bibliography" (Helen-Jo Jakusz Hewitt)

== Publication history ==
- 1974 - First edition, Chilton (US)
- 1974 - First edition, Thomas Nelson (Canada)
- 1975 - Paperback edition published by DAW Books as The Book of Andre Norton

== Themes and significance ==
The stories illustrate Norton's versatility across speculative genres, combining elements of high fantasy, folklore motifs, and science-fictional extrapolation. The Toads of Grimmerdale, set in the Witch World, is often highlighted as one of her darker and more morally complex tales.

The essay On Writing Fantasy provides Norton's reflections on the craft of storytelling, her approach to world-building, and her perspective on the role of fantasy literature.
