= Books of Swords =

Series of science fiction/fantasy novels by Fred Saberhagen

The Book of Swords Series is a series of science fiction fantasy novels by American Fred Saberhagen, published from 1983 to 1995. The story revolves around the Twelve Swords of Power, which were forged by the gods and given to humanity, and how various characters acquire and use them. The series spans several decades and features dozens of characters.

== Works ==
=== The Book of Swords ===
1. The First Book of Swords (1983)
2. The Second Book of Swords (1983)
3. The Third Book of Swords (1984)
  Omnibus: The Complete Book of Swords (1985)

=== Books of Lost Swords ===
1. Woundhealer's Story (1986)
2. Sightblinder's Story (1987)
3. Stonecutter's Story (1988)
  Omnibus: The Lost Swords: The First Triad (1988)
4. Farslayer's Story (1989)
5. Coinspinner's Story (1989)
6. Mindsword's Story (1990)
  Omnibus: The Lost Swords: The Second Triad (1990)
7. Wayfinder's Story (1992)
8. Shieldbreaker's Story (1994)
  Omnibus: The Lost Swords: Endgame (1994)

=== Short stories ===
1. An Armory of Swords (1995), an anthology of eight stories in the Swords universe by eight authors, including "Blind Man's Blade" by Saberhagen.

=== Related books ===
The Book of Swords series is also linked to the Empire of the East series, which is set in the same universe and presents the backstory to the series. The first three works in the Empire of the East series predate the Book of Swords series (The Broken Lands (1968), The Black Mountains (1971), and Changeling Earth (1973), also titled Ardneh's World), with the fourth Empire of the East book, Ardneh's Sword (2006), returning to the universe long after the Book of Swords series was complete.

== Composition ==
Saberhagen wrote the first books in the series in the 1980s with the intention of developing them into a video game. Although some preliminary code and art was developed, the project was deemed technologically infeasible.

== Premise ==
The Book of Swords series blends science fiction and fantasy, combining fantastical settings with logic-puzzle plots based on science fiction.

=== Setting ===
The books are set far into the future. Approximately 50,000 years before the story, sometime during the third millennium, mankind was almost driven to extinction by a global nuclear World War prior to the events in Empire of the East. The role of post-war technology in creating a magical mythological society echoes Saberhagen's Berserker series. An intelligent supercomputer, ARDNEH (which was formerly part of an American nuclear response system), initiated a physical change to the structure of the world. Unintentionally combined with a similar system on the other side of the world, this change negated the effects of atomic weaponry and most other forms of high technology, and introduced side effects, such as the creation of magic, gods, and demons. ARDNEH then continued to stabilize and sustain humanity through the ensuing Dark Ages. ARDNEH was destroyed millennia before the events of the series, as chronicled in Saberhagen's Empire of the East series. By the time the events recorded in The Books of the Swords occur, ARDNEH has passed into legend, worshiped as a benevolent god.

The gods of the Swords universe are based on various deities, most from the Greco-Roman and Hindu pantheons. They are elements of human hope and imagination that were made real approximately one thousand years after the destruction of ARDNEH, when a group of humans donned Mark VII suits created by ARDNEH and a djinn as a possible defense against demons. The gods, having become bored with mankind, created Twelve Swords of Power, and scattered them throughout the world, as a grand game of survival of the fittest to be played out on earth.

The demons of Saberhagen's Swords universe are the remnants of atomic or other high-power weapons detonations, rendered anthropomorphic by the Change. They can take on various forms and appearances, but their natural form is a free-floating, possibly radioactive cloud. Their presence can sicken and injure those who have not magically prepared themselves to resist them. All demons have a "source of life", which is usually hidden within a fairly innocuous object like a mirror, charm, bottle, or weapon (compare to djinn). This object does not bear any relation to the demon's physical presence. However, if it is found, control can be exerted over the demon it belongs to.

Magic is a rare and fragile art in the Swords universe, requiring a lifetime of dedication. Magic is very fragile; unsheathed blades and other iron or steel objects degrade its power significantly. Thus it has limited martial uses, and is most often used to influence others.

There are three major religious sects in the Swords universe. Although many privately worship their own gods or goddesses, there are three ubiquitous institutions. The White Temple is centered on the worship of ARDNEH and values love and respect for life. Many of the leading healing centers and hospitals are White Temples, and most of traditional "holy men" are servants of the White Temple. The Red Temple is worshipping the flesh. Its chief goddess is Aphrodite. The Red Temple provides and controls most prostitution and drugs, although they also encourage free love, gambling, gluttony, and excessive drinking. The Blue Temple worships money, and hoarding wealth. At one point, the Blue Temple hoards four of the Twelve Swords of Power, including Shieldbreaker, which they never use for fear of losing them. The Blue Temple Hoard is the famous secret depository of their holdings.

=== The Twelve Swords of Power ===
The Swords of Power were created by the gods and given to humanity as part of a great game, so they could enjoy watching humans scheme and fight amongst themselves in an effort to obtain these magical treasures. Each sword has a different ability, which corresponds to a different god. The series revolves around different characters finding, acquiring, stealing, using, and eventually destroying the swords. This provides the gods with the amusement they desire, until they find out that the even the gods themselves can fall victim to the swords. The swords are introduced by name and general ability in The Song of Swords, the poem that precedes the story, but it is only in the course of the series that the specific effects, conditions, and loopholes of these weapons are discovered. Although thought to be indestructible, by the end of the series (Shieldbreaker's Story) all the swords except Woundhealer have been destroyed.

The twelve swords are:

1. Coinspinner, "The Sword of Chance" or "The Sword of Fortune," makes the wielder supernaturally lucky in any situation. Coinspinner does not need to be physically wielded to be used--simply possessing the blade is enough for it to work. However, like luck itself, the Sword of Chance is fickle and leaves its wielder eventually. Its symbol is a pair of dice.
2. Doomgiver, "The Sword of Justice," can turn aside any attack or spell meant to harm or influence the wielder and send it back to the attacker. The protection the Sword of Justice provides is near absolute: people attempting to stab the wielder will instead stab themselves; anyone attempting to charm the wielder will instead be charmed. In fact, anything Doomgiver perceives as a threat to its owner will be repelled, making its wielder invulnerably strong. Entire armies have destroyed themselves in a vain attempt to fight the wielder. Only Shieldbreaker is immune to its effects. Its symbol is a white circle.
3. Dragonslicer, "The Sword of Heroes," allows its wielder to kill dragons. Scales that can turn aside spell and steel with equal abandon are penetrated with little effort, and the sword will always seek the heart of a dragon. Unfortunately, the blade can sometimes be difficult to remove from the wounds it makes, and offers no protection to the user. Its symbol is a dragon in flight.
4. Farslayer, "The Sword of Vengeance," can kill any person, demon, or god the wielder wishes, regardless of the physical distance that separates them or the level of protection they enjoy, with the exception of Shieldbreaker (and perhaps Doomgiver). To use Farslayer, the wielder must think of their target, then chant 'For thy heart, for thy heart, who hast wronged me'. The blade will then fly from the wielder's hand and seek out its prey, until it finally pierces its heart. While the Sword of Vengeance can travel any distance in pursuit of its target, it will remain embedded in the victim's heart once it has completed its mission. This means that Farslayer will often remain in enemy territory, leaving the means of retribution in the hands of the target's friends or relatives. They can then use Farslayer to kill the original wielder, leading to a circle of murder and reprisal that can wipe out entire feuding clans. Farslayer's symbol is a bullseye.
5. Woundhealer, "The Sword of Mercy" or "The Sword of Love," can heal any injury or ailment. It can even grow back severed limbs or heal massive mental or physical trauma (as evidenced by a man impaling himself and his horse with Woundhealer then jumping off a mountain to avoid pursuit, then riding away unharmed from the impact), though it may take some time in cases of amputation for a limb to grow back. Woundhealer cannot be used as a weapon under any circumstance--indeed, even Shieldbreaker does not consider it to be a weapon and has no effect against it. Its symbol is an open hand.
6. Skulltwister, "The Mindsword," "The Sword of Glory," or "The Sword of Madness," sends shards of poisoned light into the minds of anyone who views the drawn blade in the hands of its wielder. These poisoned shards lodge themselves in the viewers' minds, compelling absolute, fanatical devotion to the wielder, and are powerful enough to affect demons and gods as well as men. These followers will obey any order, or sacrifice anything--including their lives--at the wielder's command. The Mindsword's owner must periodically renew this influence, lest time or distance allow the victim to overcome the mental compulsion and break free. Of all of the twelve Swords of Power, Skulltwister is notable in that its true name is not revealed in the Song of Swords, or in the original trilogy. It is finally revealed in the Books of Lost Swords. Its symbol is a banner waving in the wind.
7. Shieldbreaker, "The Sword of Force," provides absolute protection from all weapons, including the other Swords of Power. Like Townsaver, The Sword of Force physically takes over the sword arm of the person wielding it, and the blade cannot be released again until the threat is gone. However, unlike Townsaver, Shieldbreaker physically protects the wielder from all harm, so long as the opponent is armed with a weapon, and will destroy any weapon it contacts, along with the wielder in most cases. Its weakness is that it cannot protect its wielder against an unarmed opponent, or someone bearing Woundhealer. In fact, the inability of the wielder to release Shieldbreaker makes it a liability, as it will actively drain the wielder's strength, impotently phasing through targeted unarmed opponents without harm until there is no strength or energy remaining in the wielder. Its symbol is a hammer.
8. Sightblinder, "The Sword of Stealth," changes the perception of anyone looking at the owner, making the wielder appear as someone the viewer knows and trusts, and allowing them to move freely wherever they choose. In addition, the wielder is provided with enhanced vision, can see through any illusion or disguise as if it wasn't there, and can know the past of a creature. Its symbol is an open eye.
9. Soulcutter, "The Sword of Despair" or "The Tyrant's Blade," causes a wave of despair that induces a deep lethargy, making anyone affected by it simply give up on life, and wonder "what's the point of it all?" as they fall to the ground to wait for death. Soulcutter has a wide radius, and its effect is powerful enough to overcome even the fanaticism induced by Skulltwister, forcing the Mindsword's victims to drop to the ground as well. Unlike Skulltwister, the Sword of Despair does not provide protection from its effect to its owner, who will also fall to the ground in despair. Without the intervention of someone who enjoys immunity to this lethargy, the victims will lie still until they starve to death or die of dehydration. Shieldbreaker's wielder is immune to the effect. Doomgiver may provide immunity as well, but the two blades never meet in battle. Soulcutter has no symbol on its hilt--it is the only sword without one.
10. Stonecutter, "The Sword of Siege," can cut through any stone or mineral-based formation as easily as it would pass through air, making stone walls useless. Its symbol is a wedge splitting a block.
11. Townsaver, "The Sword of Fury," turns its wielder into a whirlwind of steel, but only when used to defend others in a "held" place. Once the Sword has been drawn under those conditions, it makes a millsaw sound that rises into a shriek as it defends the helpless from harm by cutting through anything and everything that would harm them. The wielder cannot be stopped or killed while the Sword of Fury is active by any means short of Shieldbreaker, but the protection the Sword of Fury offers to the defenseless is not extended to the wielder himself. Wounds taken by the wielder of Townsaver will continue to accumulate until all danger has passed, whereupon the sword will cease to function and the wielder will suffer the effects of any injuries. The symbol of Townsaver is a sword peeking up from behind a crenellated castle wall.
12. Wayfinder, "The Sword of Wisdom," can be used by the wielder to indicate any location or any object they wish, without error, even leading them to the items and people necessary to complete their quest. When Wayfinder is pointed in the correct direction, the tip quivers slightly. The downside of Wayfinder's ability is that it will lead the wielder directly rather than by the safest path, which can put them in harm's way. Coinspinner can be used for the same effect, without the drawback of the added risk, but with the potential to leave right when it is needed the most. Wayfinder's symbol is an arrow.

== Characters ==
- Mark is the principal protagonist of the series, and the human with the most experience dealing with the Twelve Swords of Power. He initially believes himself to be the son of Jord the blacksmith, but later learns that he is one of the many illegitimate children of the Emperor. This gives him several mystical powers in addition to his considerable mundane ones.
- Jord is one of the conscripted smiths that aided Vulcan in forging the Swords, losing his arm in the process. Jord received Townsaver as "payment" for his services.
- Ben is Mark's steadfast friend throughout the series. Ben starts as a heavily built, powerful, extremely plain boy with aspirations of becoming a minstrel while lacking the aptitude. Over the course of the series he grows into a stalwart and dependable man. Since Mark is a paragon of virtue and heroism, Ben plays the role of a more believable and emotionally developed character for the reader to identify with.
- Barbara is a member of the Dragon Hunting team with Ben. She takes on leadership of the team after Nestor's disappearance. After the successful raid on the Blue Temple hoard makes Ben wealthy enough to support her, they marry.
- Ariane is the daughter of the Emperor and Queen Yambu, who is chosen by Wayfinder as integral to their robbery of the Blue Temple hoard. It is Ariane who first banishes a demon using the Emperor's name, prompting Mark to later use this power.
- The Emperor is the most powerful individual in the Swords universe. He is mysterious and seen as nothing more than a fairy-tale character by many. He is a magician and seemingly immune to magic himself. There is some question as to whether he is immune to the Swords. Demons fear and obey him. He acts in ways that are hard to comprehend for characters and the reader. The Emperor has begotten many illegitimate children, to the point where "Emperor's child" is a common colloquialism for any urchin, orphan, or bastard. True descendants of the Emperor (like Mark and Ariane) have a measure of his power over demons, though they are often unaware they possess it.
- Queen Yambu is first introduced as a major antagonist. When she was a teen, without power and in mortal danger, the Emperor was her friend, ally, and lover; she is the mother of Ariane. However, on attaining her throne, the two became estranged for many years. She makes a bid for world domination through the Swords, but after using Soulcutter, Yambu becomes a pilgrim "seeking truth." She eventually allies herself with Mark and Ben, becoming a trusted traveling companion of Mark's nephew Zoltan. The Emperor repeatedly attempts to reconcile with Yambu throughout the series. When she is old and powerless, she finally agrees.
- Draffut started life as a dog, and underwent a miraculous change into a giant fur-covered biped 50,000 years earlier. This gave him intelligence and magical powers of life and healing. His past as "man's best friend" rendered him unable to harm humans, even those bent on his destruction. At the same time he is sympathetic to their plight against the machinations of the gods, with a particularly ferocious animosity toward demons. It is Draffut who reveals that the gods are the creation of man rather than the reverse.
- The Dark King, known also as Vilkata, is one of the chief antagonists of the series. Vilkata is a powerful sorcerer and master of many demons. As a younger man, he gouged out his eyes as a sacrifice in order to achieve revenge over those who had wronged him. Since then, he uses minor demons kept in thrall to give him a form of telepathic vision. He employs scorched earth, torture, and other deplorable tactics to strike fear in any who would oppose him.
- Vulcan, the Smith, god of fire, volcanoes and blacksmiths, is the most prominent of the deities in the series as the creator of the Swords.
- Wood, also known as the Ancient One, is an evil wizard who ultimately becomes the primary antagonist in the Book of Swords series, after he escapes the downfall of Orcus and the Empire of the East. Wood was saved from the nuclear holocaust of Orcus' demise by travelling forward through time. This makes Wood one of only two characters who are present from the beginning of Saberhagen's Gods/Swords world to the end (the other is Draffut). He is mostly humanoid in shape, though he sports hair, claws, and horns like a beast, and has small bat-wings sprouting from his back.

== Reception ==
In Issue 24 of Abyss, John Schuller reviewed The First Book of Swords, and admitted to disliking it, commenting, "While it is readable and had a pleasant flow of action, it is an incredibly amateurish and imitative work to find from such a writer, echoing almost every major swords and sorcery epic of the past, especially the original Conan novels." Schuller concluded, "There are some nice little scenes and original ideas, but the weakness of plot and character tend to make these look like flashy dressing in a mire of uninspiring muck.""

In a retrospective of Saberhagen's works, Joan Spicci Saberhagen says the series "proved very popular among readers". A review of Armory of Swords in Kirkus was lukewarm, calling the series as a whole "generally above-average" and the short story collection "agreeable entertainment for Lost Swords fans". Jason Heller's reflections on "science fantasy" as a genre remembers the Swords series as an exciting exemplar of science fantasy, presenting a similar premise as Thundarr the Barbarian in a format that was "literary and a bit more mature".

Novelist Dan Wells credits Saberhagen with inspiring his own writing and praises the series' combination of the "stunning imagination" of fantasy with the "logical" plotting of science fiction. Despite noting that the worldbuilding is sometimes underdeveloped, Wells praises the series' "addictive brilliance" in building and then resolving the swords as interlocking "logistical puzzle[s]".
