= The Changeling (Star Trek: The Original Series) =

- Star Trek: The Original Series episode
- McCoy, Spock, and Kirk with the space probe
- Episode no.: Season 2 Episode 3
- Directed by: Marc Daniels
- Written by: John Meredyth Lucas
- Cinematography by: Jerry Finnerman
- Production code: 037
- Original air date: September 29, 1967

Guest appearances
- Blaisdell Makee – Singh; Arnold Lessing – Security Guard; Vic Perrin – Voice of Nomad; Eddie Paskey – Lt. Leslie; William Blackburn – Lt. Hadley; Meade Martin – Crewman; Roger Holloway – Lt. Lemli; Frank da Vinci – Lt. Brent

Episode chronology
| ← Previous "Who Mourns for Adonais?" | Next → "Mirror, Mirror" |
- Star Trek: The Original Series season 2

"The Changeling" is the third episode of the second season of the American science fiction television series Star Trek. Written by John Meredyth Lucas and directed by Marc Daniels, it was first broadcast on September 29, 1967.

The crew of the USS Enterprise deals with a life-destroying space probe originally launched from Earth. The plot contains similarities to the later 1979 Star Trek film.

== Plot ==
The USS Enterprise investigates a distress call from the Malurian star system. Upon arrival, First Officer Spock reports no life readings from any of the 4 billion inhabitants, despite otherwise normal recent communications. The ship's shields are suddenly activated when a meter-long cylindrical object attacks with a powerful energy bolt equivalent to 90 photon torpedoes. Captain Kirk orders return fire, but his weapon's energy is simply absorbed by the object. Following several more incoming attacks, and on the verge of his ship's destruction, Kirk hails the object. After several back-and-forth attempts, the object requests in-person communication with the Captain and allows itself to be beamed aboard the ship.

The object identifies itself as "Nomad", and refers to Captain Kirk as "the Creator." Spock reports that a Nomad space probe was launched from Earth during the early 21st century; its mission was to explore the galaxy and seek out new life, but it had been reported destroyed – a report that Spock acknowledges may have been wrong. The current Nomad has mistaken Kirk for Dr. Jackson Roykirk, the scientist who created and programmed the original probe. Nomad's new mission is to seek out and eliminate any "biological infestation" that it deems imperfect, including the entire population of the Malurian star system. Nomad states that its attempt to destroy the Enterprise had not been necessary since "the Creator" was aboard.

Left in the care of a crew member, Nomad escapes to investigate the sound of Lieutenant Uhura singing, which it detects over the intercom. Arriving on the bridge to make inquiries, it asks Uhura to "think about music" while probing her mind, which erases her memory. When Chief Engineer Scott tries to intervene, Nomad kills him, pleading self-defense. Upon learning that Kirk cannot repair Scott, Nomad offers to restore him to life. Nomad heals Scott, but cannot "repair" Uhura's memory loss; Nomad is taken to the brig. Since Uhura's brain was not damaged (only her memories erased), the medical staff proceed to re-educate her (by the end of the episode, Uhura is almost back to normal).

To uncover more information, Spock performs a Vulcan mind meld with the machine. He discovers that Nomad collided with a meteor and was severely damaged. It then wandered through space, finally coming into contact and merging with a powerful alien probe called Tan Ru, designed to obtain and sterilize soil samples from other planets. Nomad partially integrated Tan Ru's agricultural mission directives, interpreting them to mean "sterilize imperfections." The merging of the two probes imbued Nomad with Tan Ru's vast powers, sufficient to destroy life throughout an entire solar system. Kirk compares Nomad's reincarnation to the changeling legend, in which a human child is switched with a fairy child, with the latter assuming the identity of the former.

Nomad escapes from its cell, killing two guards who attempt to stop it. The probe makes its way to the engineering deck, where it begins to make adjustments to the engines, accelerating the ship beyond its normal maximum warp speed. As Kirk arrives, Nomad tells him that engine efficiency has been boosted 57%; Kirk orders it to reverse the changes since other structures on the Enterprise cannot handle the faster speed. Nomad complies.

Exasperated by Nomad's prejudice toward imperfect "biological units", Kirk points out that its own "Creator" is a biological unit. Nomad responds that it must "reevaluate." Kirk orders the probe back to the brig, and it departs under security guard. Spock then suggests to Kirk that admitting to Nomad that he, "the Creator", is imperfect was probably a mistake. Spock also observes that because Nomad has threatened to return to its "launch point", the Earth and all its inhabitants are now at risk of sterilization.

En route to the brig, Nomad kills its two security escorts and heads instead to sickbay. After examining Kirk's medical files and verifying his imperfections as a biological unit, Nomad's "reevaluation" is complete. It proceeds to engineering, incapacitates crew members and shuts down the ship's life-support systems, thus rendering the Enterprise habitable for only a short time longer.

Kirk arrives and again confronts the probe, questioning it about its mission. When Nomad declares that its directive to sterilize imperfections allows no exceptions, Kirk points out that Nomad itself is imperfect, since it has mistaken Captain Kirk for its true creator Jackson Roykirk. He then claims that Nomad has committed two other errors, by not discovering its own mistake, and by not sterilizing itself as imperfect. Nomad begins to analyze the implications of Kirk's claims, a process that causes noticeable stress to its systems. Kirk and Spock carry Nomad in a rush to the transporter room and, with a final command from Kirk to "exercise your prime function", beam it into deep space. Seconds after transport, an explosion is detected near the Enterprise and Nomad is no more. The episode ends on a humorous note, with Kirk observing that he is proud that his "son" Nomad, having healed Mr. Scott, would have made a good doctor.

== Production ==
The episode is one of only a handful in the original series of bottle episodes that take place entirely aboard the Enterprise. The others include "Charlie X", "Journey to Babel", "Elaan of Troyius", and "Is There in Truth No Beauty?"

The director, Marc Daniels, appears on screen as the still photo of Dr. Jackson Roykirk.

== Influence ==
The episode is perhaps most known for being a predecessor to the 1979 film Star Trek: The Motion Picture, which also features an Earth probe that somehow merges with a powerful alien entity far from Earth and causes problems, as V'Ger. The plot arc of human imperfections and foibles confusing a powerful but malfunctioning technology (also seen in the Star Trek episode "The Return of the Archons", as well as various pieces of sci-fi pulp fiction) would go on to become a common trope in science-fiction, to the point of parody in more comedically inclined works such as Futurama.

In 2001 the writers of the Star Trek: Enterprise episode "Civilization" used the Malurians as the antagonists in reference to this episode.

== Reception ==
In 2013, Phelim O'Neill of The Guardian made a list of representative Star Trek personal favorite episodes to watch (not necessarily the best) that included "The Changeling".

A 2015 retrospective by Keith R. A. DeCandido found the episode disappointing for The Original Series, ranking it a 4/10. He thought the concept was decent, but DeCandido felt that the tone was unfitting. Various extreme events happen in the episode – billions of Malurians are killed off-screen, Scotty is killed by NOMAD and then resurrected, Uhura has her memories wiped, and four security officers are killed. Yet the characters do not seem to grapple with this: the crew has their normal banter and are oddly blasé about the situation, and the episode closes with a joke from Kirk. He also disliked the episode leaving unexplained how Uhura was restored.

In 2016, Time magazine named NOMAD the franchise's eighth-best villain. The same year, CNET included NOMAD as one of 26 powerful spacecraft of the Star Trek franchise. Also in 2016, SyFy noted Nichelle Nichols' performance as Uhura, writing that this episode included her ninth best scene in Star Trek.

In 2024 Hollywood.com ranked "The Changeling" at number 33 out of the 79 original series episodes.

== See also ==
- Berserker hypothesis
