= The Second Book of Fritz Leiber =

1975 collection of short stories by Fritz Leiber

- Cover of 1st edition
- Author: Fritz Leiber
- Illustrator: Jack Gaughan
- Cover artist: Jack Gaughan
- Language: English
- Series: Book of ... series
- Genre: Fantasy, science fiction, horror
- Publisher: DAW Books
- Publication date: 1975
- Publication place: United States
- Media type: Print (paperback)
- Pages: 204
- ISBN: 0-87997-195-9
- OCLC: 1636662
- Preceded by: The Book of Poul Anderson
- Followed by: The Book of Andre Norton

The Second Book of Fritz Leiber collection of science fiction short stories and articles by American author Fritz Leiber. It was first published in paperback by DAW Books in September 1975 as the tenth volume in its Book of ... series. It was later gathered together with The Book of Fritz Leiber into the hardcover omnibus collection The Book of Fritz Leiber, Volume I & II (Gregg Press, 1980). The book has been translated into Italian.

== Summary ==
The book consists of five fantasy, science fiction and horror short stories alternating with six related articles, together with a foreword by the author. Some pieces were original to the collection. Others were originally published in the magazines Astounding Science Fiction for September 1950, Science Digest for April 1961, Mike Shayne Mystery Magazine for February 1961, and The Arkham Sampler for Spring 1948, and the anthology Science Fiction Thinking Machines (1954).

== Contents ==
- "Foreword"
- "The Lion and the Lamb" (1950)
- "The Mighty Tides" (1961)
- "Trapped in the Sea of Stars"
- "Fafhrd and Me" (1963)
- "Belsen Express"
- "Ingmar Bergman: Fantasy Novelist" (1974)
- "Scream Wolf" (1961)
- "Those Wild Alien Words: II"
- "The Mechanical Bride" (1954)
- "Through Hyperspace with Brown Jenkin" (1963)
- "A Defense of Werewolves" (1948)

== Awards ==
The book won the 1976 British Fantasy Award for Best Short Story. The story "Belsen Express" won the 1976 World Fantasy Award for Best Short Fiction.

== Reception ==
The collection was reviewed by L. J. Knapp in The Science Fiction Review Monthly, November 1975, and Sandy Cohen in Delap's F & SF Review, January 1976.
