= Berserker Raids =

1983 video game

- Developer: Berserker Works
- Publisher: Baen Software
- Designers: Lloyd Johnson; Fred Saberhagen
- Programmers: Apple II, MS-DOS; Lloyd Johnson; Atari 8-bit David C. Lee
- Platforms: Apple II, Atari 8-bit, Commodore 64, MS-DOS
- Release: 1983: Apple II, Atari 8-bit 1984: MS-DOS, C64
- Genre: Turn-based strategy
- Mode: Single-player

Berserker Raids is a turn-based strategy video game designed by LLoyd Johnson and Fred Saberhagen for the Apple II and published by Baen Software in 1983. It was ported to the Atari 8-bit computers, Commodore 64, and MS-DOS.

== Gameplay ==
Berserker Raids is a game in which automated machines operate as murderous space fortresses, based on short stories written by Fred Saberhagen in the 1960s.

== Reception ==
Jasper Sylvester reviewed the game for Computer Gaming World, and stated that "I wouldn't hesitate to recommend Berserker Raids to any Saberhagen or space conquest fan."
