= Empire of the East =

1979 novel by Fred Saberhagen

Empire of the East is a novel by Fred Saberhagen published in 1979.

== Plot summary ==
Empire of the East is a novel in which the East rules the West in the distant future.

== Reception ==
Dave Langford reviewed Empire of the East for White Dwarf #52, and stated that "Swashbuckling fun, routine plot, boldly unsubtle characters, clever technology-based magic: my only quibble is that according to Book 3's revelations, the atomic dreadnought unearthed in book 1 ought not to have worked."

Colin Greenland reviewed Empire of the East for Imagine magazine, and stated that "Nothing very original here but it is a well-organised yarn that trots along steadily through landscapes full of disdainful demons and enigmatic artifacts of power, not the least of them the legendary Elephant, a slumbering metal beast with '426th ARMORED DIVISION' lettered on its flank ..."

== Reviews ==
- Review by Baird Searles (1980) in Isaac Asimov's Science Fiction Magazine, April 1980
- Review by Algis Budrys (1980) in The Magazine of Fantasy & Science Fiction, May 1980
- Review by Joe Sanders (1981) in Locus, #241 February 1981
- Review by Alan Fraser (2004) in Vector 235
