= Legions of Steel =

Legions of Steel is a 1992 game published by Global Games Company.

== Gameplay ==
Legions of Steel is a game in which an invasion by machines has conquered the universe and Earth tries to fight back.

== Publication history ==
- Legions of Steel Scenario Pack 1 was released in 1993.

== Reception ==
Ken Carpenter reviewed Legions of Steel in White Wolf #48 (Oct., 1994), rating it a 4.5 out of 5 and stated that "For [the price] you get 19 detailed metal figures (sculpted by Tom Meier), 48 color floor sections, well over a hundred counters, and dice and counter stands. Most important - it's a blast to play."

== Reviews ==
- Shadis #9
- Shadis #16
- Coleção Dragão Brasil #8
- Dragon #195
