= Fred Saberhagen =

American science fiction and fantasy writer (1930–2007)

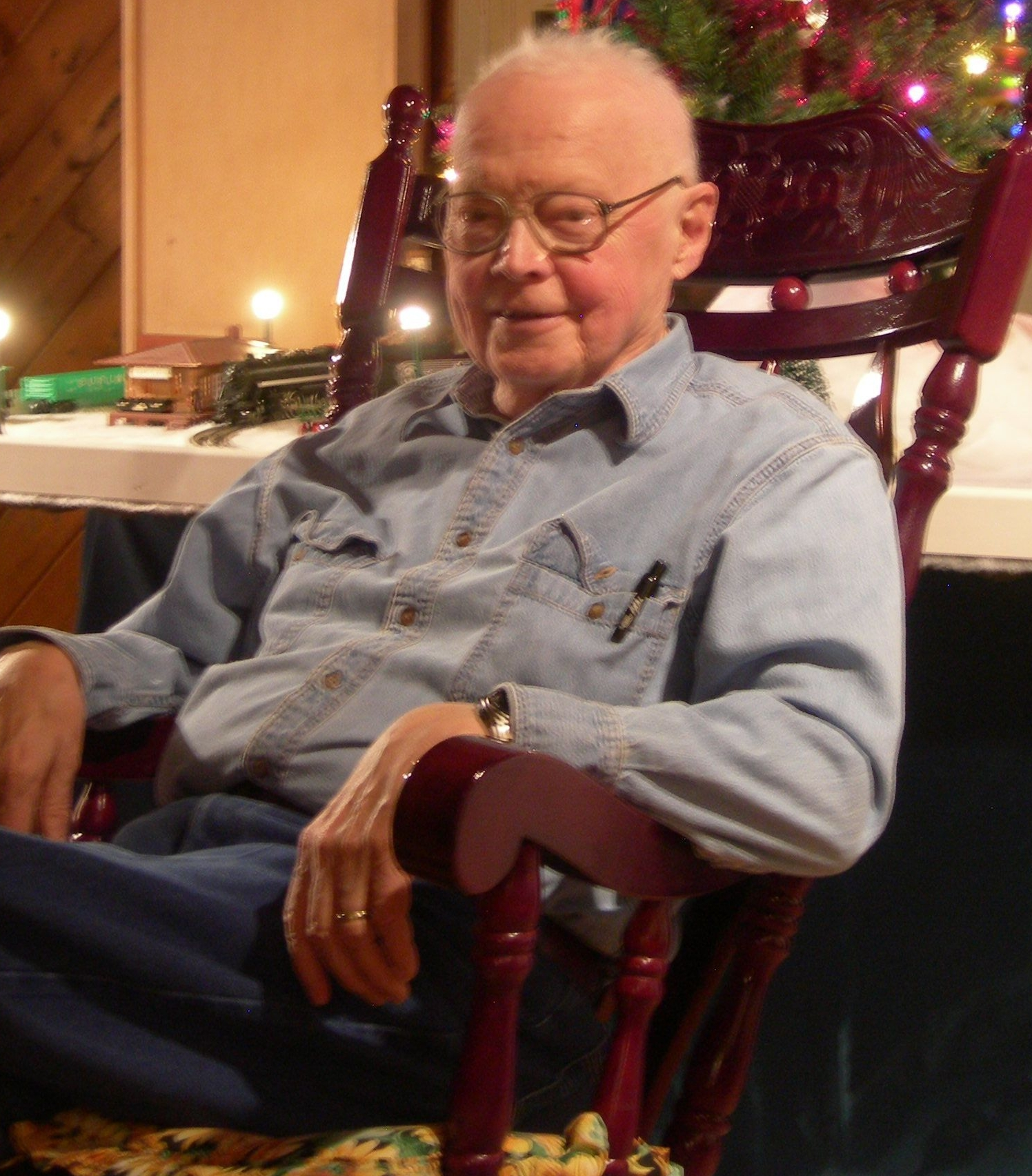
- Saberhagen in 2007
- Born: May 18, 1930; Chicago, Illinois, U.S.
- Died: June 29, 2007 (aged 77); Albuquerque, New Mexico, U.S.
- Occupation: Writer
- Spouse: Joan Spicci (m. 1968)
- Children: 3
- Writing career
- Period: 1964–2005
- Genres: Fantasy, Horror, Science fiction
- Notable work: The Berserker series The Book of Swords series
- Website: www.berserker.com

Fred Thomas Saberhagen (May 18, 1930 – June 29, 2007) was an American science fiction and fantasy author most famous for his Berserker series of science fiction short stories and novels.

Saberhagen also wrote a series of vampire novels in which the famous Dracula is the main protagonist, and a series of post-apocalyptic mytho-magical novels beginning with his popular Empire of the East series and continuing through a long series of Swords and Lost Swords novels. Saberhagen died of cancer, in Albuquerque, New Mexico.

== Biography ==
Saberhagen was born and raised in Chicago, Illinois. He served as an enlisted man in the U.S. Air Force during the Korean War while he was in his early twenties. Back in civilian life, Saberhagen worked as an electronics technician for the Motorola Corporation from 1958 to 1962, when he was around 30 years old.

It was while he was working for Motorola that Saberhagen started writing fiction seriously. His first sale was to Galaxy Magazine, which published his short story "Volume PAA–PYX" in 1961. "Fortress Ship", his first "Berserker" short story, was published in 1963. Then, in 1964, Saberhagen saw the publication of his first novel, The Golden People.

From 1967 to 1973, he worked as an editor for the Chemistry articles in the Encyclopædia Britannica as well as writing its article on science fiction. He then quit and took up writing full-time. In 1975, he moved to Albuquerque, New Mexico.

He married fellow writer Joan Spicci in 1968. They had two sons and a daughter. On June 29, 2007, Saberhagen died of prostate cancer in Albuquerque.

In his adult years, Fred Saberhagen was a practicing Catholic; indications of his faith appear from time to time in his writing.
