= Steve Davidson =

American science fiction editor (1958–2026)

- Born: December 18, 1958
- Died: November 4, 2026 (aged 67)
- Occupation: Editor
- Writing career
- Genre: Science fiction

Steve Davidson (December 18, 1958 – November 4, 2026) was an American science fiction editor. He was the editor of Amazing Stories from 2012. Davidson died on November 4, 2026, at the age of 67.

== Amazing Stories ==
Davidson acquired Amazing Stories in 2012, and restarted it as a website. The magazine was revived as a print publication in 2018 following a Kickstarter campaign, which raised over $30,000.

== Anthologies ==
- The Best of Amazing Stories: The 1926 Anthology (2014) with Jean Marie Stine
- The Best of Amazing Stories: The 1927 Anthology (2015) with Stine
- The Best of Amazing Stories: The 1940 Anthology: Special Retro-Hugo Edition (2015) with Stine
- The Best of Amazing Stories: The 1928 Anthology (2016) with Stine
- The Best of Amazing Stories: The 1929 Anthology (2017) with Stine
- The Best of Amazing Stories: The 1930 Anthology (2018) with Stine
- The Best of Amazing Stories: The 1931 Anthology (2020) with Stine
