= Patrick Lucien Price =

American game designer and editor

- Born: Patrick Lucien Price; Whiting, Indiana, United States
- Died: July 2023
- Occupations: Game designer, editor
- Writing career
- Genre: Role-playing games

Patrick Lucien Price (? - July 2023) was a game designer and editor who worked on the Dungeons & Dragons fantasy role-playing game from TSR.

== Early life ==
Pat Price was born in Whiting, Indiana. Price earned a B.A. in French and Spanish from Marian College in Indianapolis, Indiana, and worked as a teacher and tutor in those languages for several years.

== Career ==
Price's brother, Michael Pierre Price, was a game designer for TSR, Inc. Price answered the call for new editors at TSR, beginning as a games editor in 1980 for the revisions Dungeons & Dragons Basic Set and Expert Set. A year later, he was promoted to manager of the Pre-Press Department, and managed the department for nearly three years before transferring to TSR's magazines department. “By this time, I had the technical background to be a good editor, and I could be useful in all phases of the operation,” Price said. “I’m not a gaming fan, or a would-be game designer, or a would-be writer. I like the editor’s role—the responsibility for helping people come up with ideas and make them work. I think I’ve got a good critical sense for identifying problem areas in manuscripts and advising writers on improvements?”

Price worked on the editorial staff for Dragon magazine, reviewing all fiction submissions for Dragon, editing book reviews, and other editorial duties. Price also worked as Assistant Editor for Strategy & Tactics, and Managing Editor for Amazing Stories while with TSR. With George H. Scithers, he coordinated all business and production aspects of Amazing Stories. While working as editor for the magazine, Price left his fulltime position at TSR as director of periodicals to go freelance and work on nonfiction writing in October 1988, and continued to edit Amazing but his editing on Dragon was taken over by Barbara G. Young.

Price also worked on Dungeon magazine, and contributed to the Dragonlance supplement, Leaves from the Inn of the Last Home (1987).
