= Elinor Mavor =

Elinor Mavor (born c. 1936) was the editor of Amazing Stories and Fantastic from early 1979 until late 1981. She had done illustrations and production work for several magazines, working for Arthur Bernhard. She had also been an editor at Bill of Fare, a restaurant trade magazine. When Ted White resigned from Bernhard's UPD in November 1978, Mavor became the editor of both Bernhard's science fiction and fantasy magazines. She had read a good deal of science fiction but knew nothing about the world of science fiction magazines.

For the first few issues Mavor used the pseudonym of "Omar Gohagen", as she was unsure whether a woman editor could be accepted by the readership. Her tenure saw the magazines display more sophisticated page layout, but she was unable to make the magazines successful. In 1980, Fantastic was merged with Amazing; and in May 1982, TSR, Inc. acquired Amazing from Bernhard, who was retiring. By this time the circulation had dropped to only about 11,000. George H. Scithers took over as editor for TSR.

In 1995 she wrote about some of her experiences at Amazing Stories in her introduction to Wayne Wightman's short story collection, Ganglion & Other Stories (published by Tachyon Publications).
