= Amazing Stories =

American science fiction magazine

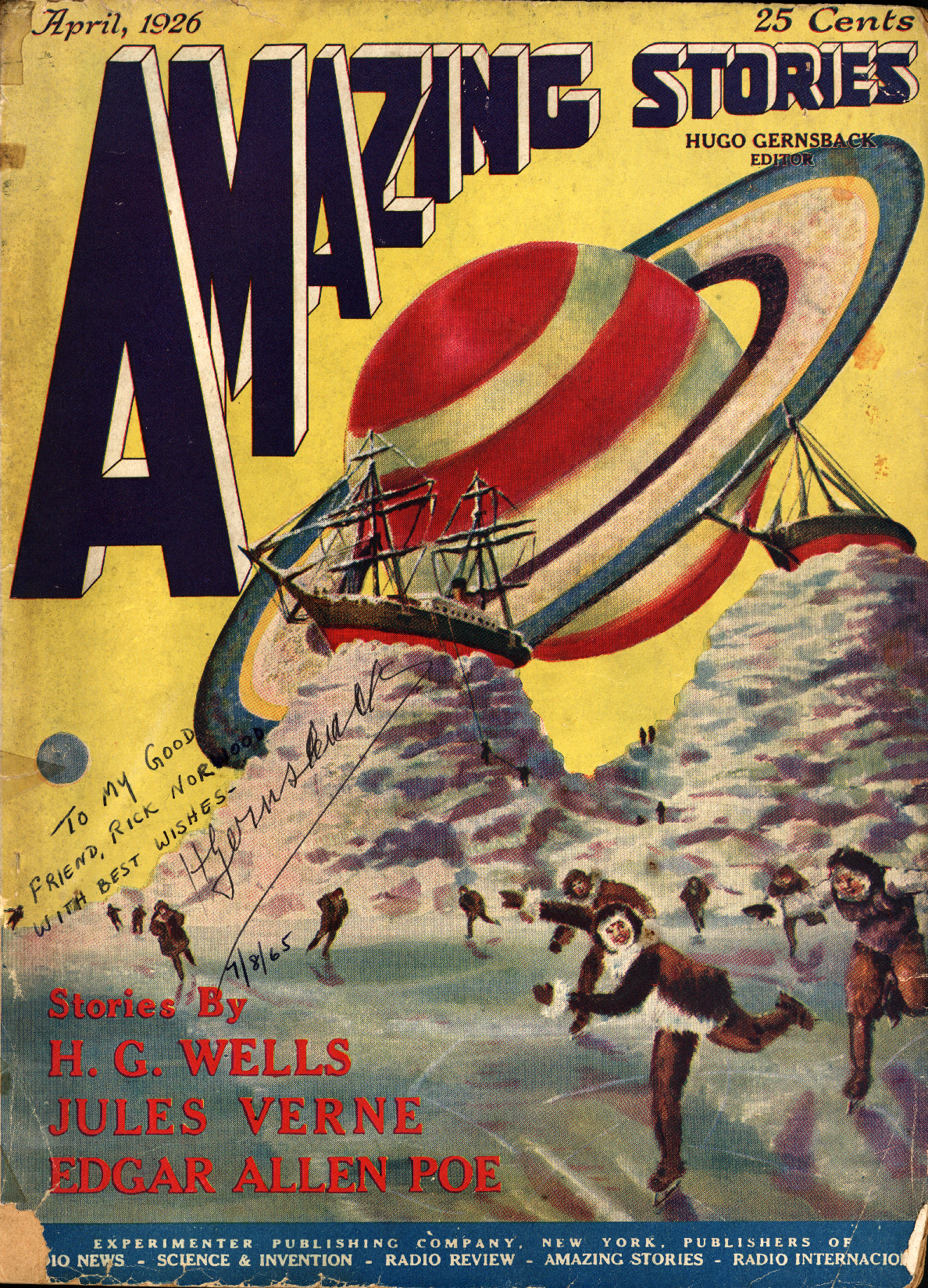
First issue of Amazing Stories, art by Frank R. Paul. This copy was autographed by Hugo Gernsback in 1965.

Amazing Stories is an American science fiction magazine launched in April 1926 by Hugo Gernsback's Experimenter Publishing. It was the first magazine devoted solely to science fiction. Science fiction stories had made regular appearances in other magazines, including some published by Gernsback, but Amazing helped define and launch a new genre of pulp fiction.

As of 2024, Amazing has been published, with some interruptions, for 98 years, going through a half-dozen owners and many editors as it struggled to be profitable. Gernsback was forced into bankruptcy and lost control of the magazine in 1929. In 1938 it was purchased by Ziff-Davis, which hired Raymond A. Palmer as editor. Palmer made the magazine successful though it was not regarded as a quality magazine within the science fiction community. In the late 1940s Amazing presented as fact stories about the Shaver Mystery, a lurid mythos that explained accidents and disaster as the work of robots named deros, which led to dramatically increased circulation but widespread ridicule. Amazing switched to a digest size format in 1953, shortly before the end of the pulp-magazine era. It was sold to Sol Cohen's Universal Publishing Company in 1965, which filled it with reprinted stories but did not pay a reprint fee to the authors, creating a conflict with the newly formed Science Fiction Writers of America. Ted White took over as editor in 1969, eliminated the reprints and made the magazine respected again: Amazing was nominated for the prestigious Hugo Award three times during his tenure in the 1970s. Several other owners attempted to create a modern incarnation of the magazine in the following decades, but publication was suspended after the March 2005 issue. A new incarnation appeared in July 2012 as an online magazine. Print publication resumed with the Fall 2018 issue.

Gernsback's initial editorial approach was to blend instruction with entertainment; he believed science fiction could educate readers. His audience rapidly showed a preference for implausible adventures, and the movement away from Gernsback's idealism accelerated when the magazine changed hands in 1929. Despite this, Gernsback had an enormous impact on the field: the creation of a specialist magazine for science fiction spawned an entire genre publishing industry. The letter columns in Amazing, where fans could make contact with each other, led to the formation of science fiction fandom, which in turn had a strong influence on the development of the field. Writers whose first story was published in the magazine include John W. Campbell, Isaac Asimov, Howard Fast, Ursula K. Le Guin, Roger Zelazny, and Thomas M. Disch. Overall, though, Amazing itself was rarely an influential magazine within the genre after the 1920s.

== Origins ==
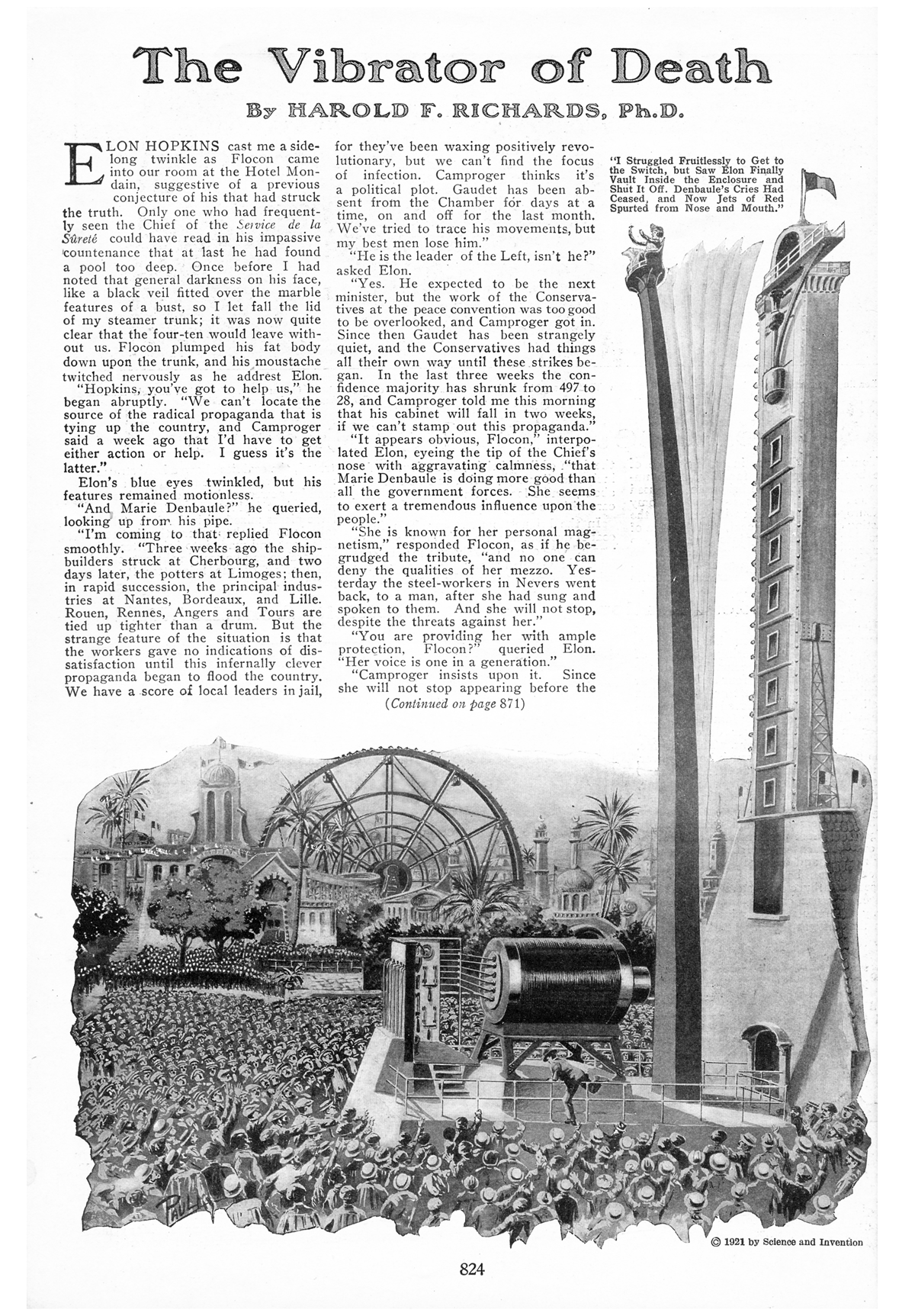
A "scientific fiction" story illustrated by Frank R. Paul in a 1922 issue of Science and Invention.

By the end of the 19th century, stories centered on scientific inventions, and stories set in the future, were appearing regularly in popular fiction magazines. The market for short stories lent itself to tales of invention in the tradition of Jules Verne. Magazines such as Munsey's Magazine and The Argosy, launched in 1889 and 1896 respectively, carried a few science fiction stories each year. Some upmarket "slick" magazines such as McClure's, which paid well and were aimed at a more literary audience, also carried scientific stories, but by the early years of the 20th century, science fiction (though it was not yet called that) was appearing more often in the pulp magazines than in the slicks.

In 1908, Hugo Gernsback published the first issue of Modern Electrics, a magazine aimed at the scientific hobbyist. It was an immediate success, and Gernsback began to include articles on imaginative uses of science, such as "Wireless on Saturn" (December 1908). In April 1911, Gernsback began the serialization of his science fiction novel, Ralph 124C 41+, but in 1913 he sold his interest in the magazine to his partner and launched a new magazine, Electrical Experimenter, which soon began to publish scientific fiction. In 1920, Gernsback retitled the magazine Science and Invention, and through the early 1920s he published much scientific fiction in its pages, along with non-fiction scientific articles.

Gernsback had started another magazine called Practical Electrics in 1921. In 1924, he changed its name to The Experimenter, and sent a letter to 25,000 people to gauge interest in the possibility of a magazine devoted to scientific fiction; in his words, "the response was such that the idea was given up for two years". In 1926, he decided to proceed and ceased publication of The Experimenter to make room in his publishing schedule for a new magazine. The editor of The Experimenter, T. O'Conor Sloane, became the editor of Amazing Stories. The first issue appeared on 10 March 1926, with a cover date of April.

== Publishing history ==
=== 1920s ===
	Jan	Feb	Mar	Apr	May	Jun	Jul	Aug	Sep	Oct	Nov	Dec
1926				1/1	1/2	1/3	1/4	1/5	1/6	1/7	1/8	1/9
1927	1/10	1/11	1/12	2/1	2/2	2/3	2/4	2/5	2/6	2/7	2/8	2/9
1928	2/10	2/11	2/12	3/1	3/2	3/3	3/4	3/5	3/6	3/7	3/8	3/9
1929	3/10	3/11	3/12	4/1	4/2	4/3	4/4	4/5	4/6	4/7	4/8	4/9
1930	4/10	4/11	4/12	5/1	5/2	5/3	5/4	5/5	5/6	5/7	5/8	5/9
1931	5/10	5/11	5/12	6/1	6/2	6/3	6/4	6/5	6/6	6/7	6/8	6/9
1932	6/10	6/11	6/12	7/1	7/2	7/3	7/4	7/5	7/6	7/7	7/8	7/9
1933	7/10	7/11	7/12	8/1	8/2	8/3	8/4	8/5		8/6	8/7	8/8
1934	8/9	8/10	8/11	8/12	9/1	9/2	9/3	9/4	9/5	9/6	9/7	9/8
1935	9/9	9/10	9/11	10/1	10/2	10/3	10/4	10/5		10/6		10/7
1936		10/8		10/9		10/10		10/11		10/12		10/13
1937		11/1		11/2		11/3		11/4		11/5		11/6
1938		12/1		12/2		12/3		12/4		12/5	12/6	12/7
1939	13/1	13/2	13/3	13/4	13/5	13/6	13/7	13/8	13/9	13/10	13/11	13/12
Issues of Amazing to 1939, identifying volume and issue numbers, and indicating editors: Gernsback Lynch Sloane Palmer

Initially the magazine focused on reprints; both classics such as Wells, Verne and Poe, and stories from other Gernsback magazines. The first original story was "The Man From the Atom (Sequel)" by G. Peyton Wertenbaker in the second issue, May 1926. In the August issue, new stories (still a minority) were noted with an asterisk in the table of contents. The editorial work was largely done by Sloane, but Gernsback retained final say over the fiction content. Two consultants – Conrad A. Brandt and Wilbur C. Whitehead – were hired to help find fiction to reprint. Frank R. Paul, who had worked with Gernsback as early as 1914, became the cover artist; Paul had produced many illustrations for the fiction in The Electrical Experimenter. Amazing was issued in the large bedsheet format, 8.5 × 11.75 in (216 × 298 mm), the same size as the technical magazines. It was an immediate success and by the following March reached a circulation of 150,000.

Gernsback saw that there was an enthusiastic readership for "scientifiction" (the term "science fiction" had not yet been coined), and in 1927 started a Discussions section and issued Amazing Stories Annual. The annual sold out, and in January 1928, Gernsback launched a quarterly magazine Amazing Stories Quarterly, as a regular companion to Amazing. It continued on a fairly regular schedule for 22 issues.

Gernsback was slow to pay his authors and creditors; the extent of his investments limited his liquidity. On 20 February 1929 his printer and paper supplier opened bankruptcy proceedings against him. It has been suggested that Bernarr Macfadden, another magazine publisher, maneuvered to force the bankruptcy because Gernsback would not sell his titles to Macfadden, but this is unproven. Experimenter Publishing did not file any defence and was declared bankrupt by default on 6 March; Amazing survived with its existing staff, but Hugo and his brother, Sidney, were forced out as directors. Arthur H. Lynch took over as editor-in-chief, though Sloane continued to have effective control of the magazine's contents. The receivers, Irving Trust, sold the magazine to Bergan A. Mackinnon on 3 April.

=== 1930s ===
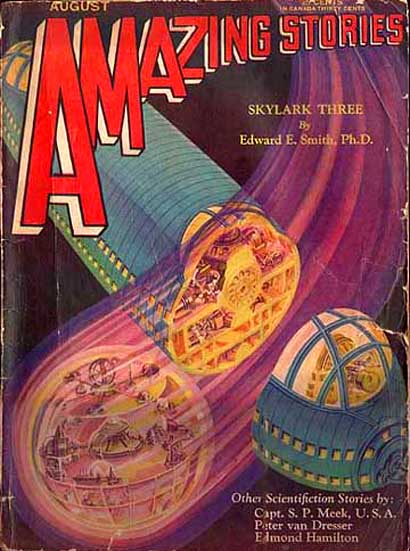
Amazing Stories, August 1930

In August 1931, Amazing was acquired by Teck Publications, a subsidiary of Bernarr Macfadden's Macfadden Publications. Macfadden's deep pockets helped insulate Amazing from the financial strain caused by the Great Depression. The schedule of Amazing Stories Quarterly began to slip, but Amazing did not miss an issue in the early 1930s. However, it became unprofitable to publish over the next few years. Circulation dropped to little more than 25,000 in 1934, and in October 1935 it switched to bimonthly (publishing every other month).

By 1938, with Amazing's circulation down to only 15,000, Teck Publications was having financial problems. In January, Ziff-Davis took over the magazine and shortly thereafter moved production to Chicago; the April issue was assembled by Sloane but published by Ziff-Davis. Bernard Davis, who ran Ziff-Davis's editorial department, attempted to hire Roger Sherman Hoar as editor; Hoar turned down the job but suggested Raymond A. Palmer, an active local science fiction fan. Palmer was hired that February, taking over editorial duties with the June issue. Ziff-Davis launched Fantastic Adventures, a fantasy companion to Amazing, in May 1939, also under Palmer's editorship. Palmer quickly managed to improve Amazing's circulation, and in November 1938, the magazine went monthly again, though this did not last throughout Palmer's tenure: between 1944 and 1946 the magazine was bimonthly and then quarterly for a while before returning to a longer-lasting monthly schedule.

=== 1940s ===
	Jan	Feb	Mar	Apr	May	Jun	Jul	Aug	Sep	Oct	Nov	Dec
1940	14/1	14/2	14/3	14/4	14/5	14/6	14/7	14/8	14/9	14/10	14/11	14/12
1941	15/1	15/2	15/3	15/4	15/5	15/6	15/7	15/8	15/9	15/10	15/11	15/12
1942	16/1	16/2	16/3	16/4	16/5	16/6	16/7	16/8	16/9	16/10	16/11	16/12
1943	17/1	17/2	17/3	17/4	17/5	17/6	17/7	17/8	17/9		17/10	
1944	18/1		18/2		18/3				18/4			18/5
1945			19/1			19/2			19/3			19/4
1946		20/1			20/2	20/3	20/4	20/5	20/6	20/7	20/8	20/9
1947	21/1	21/2	21/3	21/4	21/5	21/6	21/7	21/8	21/9	21/10	21/11	21/12
1948	22/1	22/2	22/3	22/4	22/5	22/6	22/7	22/8	22/9	22/10	22/11	22/12
1949	23/1	23/2	23/3	23/4	23/5	23/6	23/7	23/8	23/9	23/10	23/11	23/12
Issues of Amazing in the 1940s, with the volume/issue number identified. Ray Palmer was editor throughout the 1940s

In September 1943, Richard Shaver, an Amazing reader, began to correspond with Palmer, who soon asked him to write stories for the magazine. Shaver responded with a story called "I Remember Lemuria", published in the March 1945 issue, which was presented by Palmer as a mixture of truth and fiction. The story, about prehistoric civilizations, dramatically boosted Amazing's circulation, and Palmer ran a new Shaver story in every issue, culminating in a special issue in June 1947 devoted entirely to the Shaver Mystery, as it was called. (Note: Palmer claimed the highest circulation of any science fiction magazine, but del Rey comments that though this may have been true, "Palmer's tendency to magnify everything about the magazine cannot be discounted".) Amazing soon drew ridicule for these stories. A derisive article by William S. Baring-Gould in the September 1946 issue of Harper's prompted William Ziff to tell Palmer to limit the amount of Shaver-related material in the magazine; Palmer complied, but his interest (and possibly belief) in this sort of material was now significant, and he soon began planning to leave Ziff-Davis. In 1947 he formed Clark Publications, launching Fate the following year, and in 1949 he resigned from Ziff-Davis to edit that and other magazines.

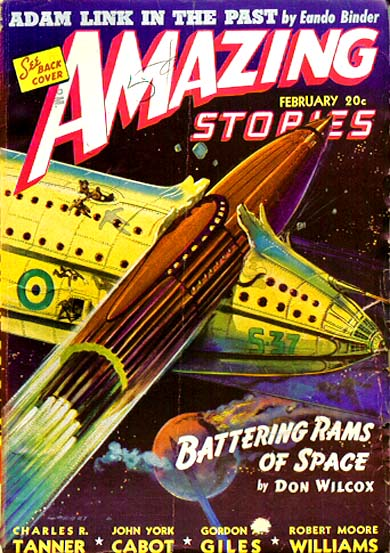
February 1941 issue cover art

Howard Browne, who had been on a leave of absence from Ziff-Davis to write fiction, took over as editor and began by throwing away 300,000 words of inventory that Palmer had acquired before he left. Browne had ambitions of moving Amazing upmarket, and his argument was strengthened by Street & Smith, one of the longest established and most respected publishers, who shut down all of their pulp magazines in the summer of 1949. The pulps were dying, largely as a result of the success of pocketbooks, and Street & Smith decided to concentrate on their slick magazines. Some pulps struggled on for a few more years, but Browne was able to persuade Ziff and Davis that the future was in the slicks, and they raised his fiction budget from one cent to a ceiling of five cents per word. Browne managed to get promises of new stories from many well-known authors, including Isaac Asimov and Theodore Sturgeon. He produced a dummy issue in April 1950, and planned to launch the new incarnation of Amazing in April 1951, the 25th anniversary of the first issue. However, the economic impact of the Korean War, which broke out in June 1950, led to budget cuts. The plans were cancelled, and Ziff-Davis never revived the idea.

=== 1950s ===
	Jan	Feb	Mar	Apr	May	Jun	Jul	Aug	Sep	Oct	Nov	Dec
1950	24/1	24/2	24/3	24/4	24/5	24/6	24/7	24/8	24/9	24/10	24/11	24/12
1951	25/1	25/2	25/3	25/4	25/5	25/6	25/7	25/8	25/9	25/10	25/11	25/12
1952	26/1	26/2	26/3	26/4	26/5	26/6	26/7	26/8	26/9	26/10	26/11	26/12
1953	27/1	27/2	27/3	27/4		27/5		27/6		27/7		27/8
1954	27/8		28/1		28/2		28/3		28/4		28/5	
1955	29/1		29/2		29/3		29/4		29/5		29/6	29/7
1956	30/1	30/2	30/3	30/4	30/5	30/6	30/7	30/8	30/9	30/10	30/11	30/12
1957	31/1	31/2	31/3	31/4	31/5	31/6	31/7	31/8	31/9	31/10	31/11	31/12
1958	32/1	32/2	32/3	32/4	32/5	32/6	32/7	32/8	32/9	32/10	32/11	32/12
1959	33/1	33/2	33/3	33/4	33/5	33/6	33/7	33/8	33/9	33/10	33/11	33/12
Issues of Amazing in the 1950s, identifying volume and issue numbers, and indicating editors: Browne Fairman Goldsmith

Browne's interest in Amazing declined when the project to turn it into a slick magazine was derailed. Although he stayed involved with Fantastic Adventures, another Ziff-Davis magazine, he left the editing work on Amazing to William Hamling and Lila Shaffer. In December 1950, when Ziff-Davis moved their offices from Chicago to New York, Hamling stayed behind in Chicago, and Browne revived his involvement with the magazine.

Amazing Stories November 1957

In 1952, Browne convinced Ziff-Davis to try a high-quality digest fantasy magazine. Fantastic, which appeared in the summer of that year, focused on fantasy rather than science fiction and was so successful that it persuaded Ziff-Davis to switch Amazing from pulp format to digest in early 1953 (while also switching to a bimonthly schedule). Circulation fell, however, and subsequent budget cuts limited the story quality in both Amazing and Fantastic. Fantastic began to print science fiction as well as fantasy. Circulation increased as a result, but Browne, who was not a science fiction aficionado, once again lost interest in the magazines.

Paul W. Fairman replaced Browne as editor in September 1956. Early in Fairman's tenure, Bernard Davis decided to try issuing a companion series of novels, titled Amazing Stories Science Fiction Novels. Readers' letters in Amazing had indicated a desire for novels, which Amazing did not have room to run. The novel series did not last; only one, Henry Slesar's 20 Million Miles to Earth, appeared. However, in response to readers' interest in longer fiction, Ziff-Davis expanded Amazing by 16 pages, starting with the March 1958 issue, and the magazine began to run complete novels.

Fairman left to edit Ellery Queen's Mystery Magazine at the end of 1958, and his place was taken by Cele Goldsmith. Goldsmith had been hired in 1955 as a secretary and became assistant editor to help cope with the additional work created when Ziff-Davis launched two short-lived magazines, Dream World and Pen Pals, in 1956. Ziff-Davis were not confident of Goldsmith's abilities as an editor, so when Fairman left, a consultant, Norman Lobsenz, was hired to work with her. She performed well and Lobsenz's involvement soon became minimal.

=== 1960s ===
	Jan	Feb	Mar	Apr	May	Jun	Jul	Aug	Sep	Oct	Nov	Dec
1960	34/1	34/2	34/3	34/4	34/5	34/6	34/7	34/8	34/9	34/10	34/11	34/12
1961	35/1	35/2	35/3	35/4	35/5	35/6	35/7	35/8	35/9	35/10	35/11	35/12
1962	36/1	36/2	36/3	36/4	36/5	36/6	36/7	36/8	36/9	36/10	36/11	36/12
1963	37/1	37/2	37/3	37/4	37/5	37/6	37/7	37/8	37/9	37/10	37/11	37/12
1964	38/1	38/2	38/3	38/4	38/5	38/6	38/7	38/8	38/9	38/10	38/11	38/12
1965	39/1	39/2	39/3	39/4	39/5	39/6		40/1		40/2		40/3
1966		40/4		40/5		40/6		40/7		40/8		40/9
1967		40/10		41/1		41/2		41/3		41/4		41/5
1968		41/6		42/1			42/2		42/3		42/4	
1969	42/5		42/6		43/1		43/2		43/3		43/4	
Issues of Amazing in the 1960s, identifying volume and issue numbers, and indicating editors: Goldsmith (Lalli) Wrzos Harrison Malzberg White

Goldsmith is well regarded by science fiction historians for her innovation, and the impact she had on the early careers of writers such as Ursula K. Le Guin and Roger Zelazny, but circulation lagged during her tenure. By 1964 Fantastic's circulation was down to 27,000, with Amazing doing little better. The following March both Amazing and Fantastic were sold to Ultimate Publishing Company, run by Sol Cohen and Arthur Bernhard. Goldsmith was given the choice of going with the magazines or staying with Ziff-Davis; she stayed, and Cohen hired Joseph Wrzos to edit the magazines, starting with the August and September 1965 issues of Amazing and Fantastic, respectively. Wrzos used the name "Joseph Ross" on the mastheads to avoid mis-spellings. Both magazines immediately moved to a bi-monthly schedule.

Amazing Stories November 1961

Cohen had acquired reprint rights to the magazines' back issues, although Wrzos did get Cohen to agree to print one new story every issue. Cohen was also producing reprint magazines such as Great Science Fiction and Science Fiction Classics, but no payment was made to authors for any of these reprints. This brought Cohen into conflict with the Science Fiction Writers of America (SFWA), a professional writers' organization formed in 1965. Soon SFWA called for a boycott of Ultimate's magazines until Cohen agreed to make payments. Cohen agreed to pay a flat fee for all stories, and then in August 1967 this was changed to a graduated rate, depending on the length of the story. Harry Harrison had acted as an intermediary in Cohen's negotiations with SFWA, and when Wrzos left in 1967, Cohen asked Harrison to take over. SF Impulse, which Harrison had been editing, had folded in February 1967, so Harrison was available. He secured Cohen's agreement that the policy of printing almost nothing but reprinted stories would be phased out by the end of the year, and took over as editor with the September 1967 issue.

By February 1968 Harrison decided to leave, as Cohen was showing no signs of abandoning the reprints. He resigned, and suggested Barry N. Malzberg to Cohen as a possible successor. Cohen knew Malzberg from his work at the Scott Meredith Literary Agency, and thought that he might be more amenable than Harrison to continuing the reprint policy. Malzberg took over in April, but immediately came into conflict with Cohen over the reprints, and then threatened to resign in October over a disagreement about artwork Malzberg had commissioned for a cover. Cohen contacted Robert Silverberg, then the president of SFWA, and told him (falsely) that Malzberg had actually resigned. Silverberg recommended Ted White as a replacement. Cohen secured White's agreement and then fired Malzberg; White assumed control with the May 1969 issue.

=== 1970s ===
	Jan	Feb	Mar	Apr	May	Jun	Jul	Aug	Sep	Oct	Nov	Dec
1970	43/5		43/6		44/1		44/2		44/3		44/4	
1971	44/5		44/6		45/1		45/2		45/3		45/4	
1972	45/5		45/6		46/1		46/2		46/3		46/4	
1973	46/5		46/6			47/1		47/2		47/3		47/4
1974		47/5		47/6		48/1		48/2		48/3		48/4
1975			48/5		48/6		49/1		49/2		49/3	
1976	49/4		49/5			50/1			50/2			50/3
1977			50/4				50/5			51/1		
1978	51/2				51/3			51/4			52/1	
1979		52/2			52/3			52/4			27/5	
Issues of Amazing in the 1970s, identifying volume and issue numbers, and indicating editors: White Mavor. The apparently erroneous volume numbering for the November 1979 issue is in fact shown correctly.

When White took over as editor, Amazing's circulation was about 38,500, only about 4% of which were subscribers (as opposed to newsstand sales). This was a very low ebb for subscriptions; Analog, by comparison, sold about 35% of its circulation through subscriptions. Cohen's wife mailed out the subscription copies from home, and Cohen had never tried to increase the subscriber base as this would have increased the burden on his wife. White worked hard to increase the circulation despite Cohen's lack of support, but met with limited success. One of his first changes was to reduce the typeface to increase the amount of fiction in the magazine. To pay for this he increased the price of both Fantastic and Amazing to 60 cents, but this had a strong negative effect on circulation, which fell about 10% from 1969 to 1970.

In 1972, White changed the title to Amazing Science Fiction, distancing the magazine slightly from some of the pulp connotations of "Amazing Stories". White worked at a low wage, and his friends often read manuscripts for free, but despite his efforts the circulation continued to fall. From near 40,000 when White joined the magazine, the circulation fell to about 23,000 in October 1975. White was unwilling to continue with the very limited financial backing that Cohen provided, and he resigned in 1975. Cohen was able to convince White to remain; White promised to stay for one more year, but in the event remained as editor until late 1978.

Amazing raised its price from 75 cents to $1.00 with the November 1975 issue. The schedule switched to quarterly beginning with the March 1976 issue; as a result, the 50th anniversary issue had a cover date of June 1976. In 1977, Amazing and Fantastic lost $15,000, though Amazing's circulation (at nearly 26,000) was as good as it had been for several years. Cohen looked for a new publisher to buy the magazines, but in September of the following year sold his half-share in the company to his partner, Arthur Bernhard. White had occasionally suggested to Cohen that Amazing would benefit from a redesign and investment; he made the same suggestions to Bernhard in early October. According to White, Bernhard not only said no, but told him he would not receive a salary until the next issue was turned in. In late 1978 White resigned, and returned all manuscripts in his possession to their authors, even if copy-edited and ready for publication. White claimed Bernhard had told him to do this, though Bernhard denied it.

=== 1980s to 2000s ===
		Spring			Summer			Fall			Winter	
	Jan	Feb	Mar	Apr	May	Jun	Jul	Aug	Sep	Oct	Nov	Dec
1980		27/6			27/7			27/8			27/9	
1981	27/10		27/11		27/12		28/1		28/2		28/3	
1982	28/4		28/5			28/6			28/7		28/8	
1983	28/9		56/5		57/1		57/2		57/3		57/4	
1984	57/5		57/6		58/1		58/2		58/3		58/4	
1985	58/5		58/6		59/1		59/2		59/3		60/1	
1986	60/2		60/3		61/1		61/2		61/3		61/4	
1987	61/5		61/6		62/1		62/2		62/3		62/4	
1988	62/5		62/6		63/1		63/2		63/3		63/4	
1989	63/5		63/6		64/1		64/2		64/3		64/4	
1990	64/5		64/6		65/1		65/2		65/3		65/4	
1991	65/5		65/6		66/1	66/2	66/3	66/4	66/5	66/6	66/7	66/8
1992	66/9	66/10	66/11	67/1	67/2	67/3	67/4	67/5	67/6	67/7	67/8	67/9
1993	67/10	67/11	67/12	68/1	68/2	68/3	68/4	68/5	68/6	68/7	68/8	
1994	68/9			69/1					69/2			
1995	69/3											
1998							70/1			70/2		
1999	70/3			71/1			71/2			71/3		
2000	71/4		71/5	72/1			72/2					
2004									73/1	73/2	73/3	73/4
2005	74/1	74/2	74/3									
2012							0/1	0/2				
2013												
2014				75/1								
2018									76/1		76/2	
2019			76/3			76/4		77/1				
2020									77/2			
2021								77/3				
Issues of Amazing from the 1980s onwards, identifying volume and issue numbers, and indicating editors: Mavor Scithers Price Mohan Gross Berkwits Davidson; The odd volume numbering in 1983 is correctly shown. Issue 71/5 was labelled "Special Edition" and was not dated with a month or season. The volume numbering in 2012 is correctly shown.

Elinor Mavor took over as editor in early 1979. She had worked for Bernhard as an illustrator and in the production department of several of his magazines, though not for Amazing. She had also been an editor at Bill of Fare, a restaurant trade magazine. Mavor had read a good deal of science fiction but knew nothing about the world of science fiction magazines when she took over. She was not confident that a woman would be accepted as the editor of a science fiction magazine, so she initially used the pseudonym "Omar Gohagen" for both Amazing and Fantastic, dropping it late in 1980. Circulation continued to fall, and Bernhard refused to consider Mavor's request to undertake a subscription drive. Instead, in late 1980, Bernhard decided to merge the two magazines. Fantastic's last independent issue was in October; thereafter the combined magazine returned to a bimonthly schedule. At the same time the title was changed to Amazing Science Fiction Stories. Bernhard cut Mavor's salary after the merger, as she was editing only one magazine. Despite this, she stayed with Amazing, but was unable to prevent circulation from dropping again, down to only 11,000 newsstand sales in 1982.

Shortly after the merger, Bernhard decided to retire, and approached Edward Ferman, the editor of Fantasy and Science Fiction, and Joel Davis, at Davis Publications, among others, about a possible sale of Amazing. Jonathan Post, of Emerald City Publishing, believed he had concluded a deal with Bernhard, and began to advertise for submissions, but the negotiations failed. Bernhard also approached George H. Scithers, who declined, but put Bernhard in touch with Gary Gygax of TSR. On 27 May 1982 TSR, Inc. acquired the trademarks and copyrights of Amazing Stories. Scithers was taken on by TSR as editor beginning with the November issue. He was replaced by Patrick Lucien Price in September 1986, and then by Kim Mohan in May 1991. TSR ceased publication of Amazing with the Winter 1995 issue, but in 1997, shortly after they were acquired by Wizards of the Coast, the magazine was relaunched, again with Mohan as editor. This version lasted for only ten issues, though it did include a special celebratory 600th issue in early 2000. The science fiction trade journal Locus commented in an early review that distribution of the magazine seemed to be weak. The title proved unable to survive: the last issue of this version was dated Summer 2000. The title was then acquired by Paizo Publishing, who launched a new monthly version in September 2004. The February 2005 issue was the last printed; a March issue was released in PDF format, and in March 2006 Paizo announced that it would no longer publish Amazing. In September 2011, the trademark for Amazing Stories was acquired by Steve Davidson. Two online issues appeared, in July and August 2012, followed by another in 2014. Davidson relaunched print publication of Amazing Stories with the Fall 2018 issue with Ira Nayman as editor. In 2022 Davidson stepped down as publisher for personal reasons and former Creative Director, Kermit Woodall, took over as publisher.

== Contents and reception ==
=== Gernsback era ===
Gernsback's editorial in the first issue asserted that "not only do these amazing tales make tremendously interesting reading—they are also always instructive". He had always believed that "scientifiction", as he called these stories, had educational power, but he now understood that the fiction had to entertain as well as to instruct. His continued belief in the instructional value of science fiction was not in keeping with the general attitude of the public towards pulp magazines, which was that they were "trash".

The first issue of Amazing contained only reprints, beginning with a serialization of Off on a Comet, by Jules Verne. In keeping with Gernsback's new approach, this was one of Verne's least scientifically plausible novels. Also included were H. G. Wells's "The New Accelerator", and Edgar Allan Poe's "The Facts in the Case of M. Valdemar"; Gernsback put the names of all three authors on the cover. He also reprinted three more recent stories. Two came from his own magazine, Science and Invention; these were "The Man from the Atom" by G. Peyton Wertenbaker and "The Thing from—'Outside'" by George Allan England. The third was Austin Hall's The Man Who Saved the Earth, which had appeared in All-Story Weekly.

In the June 1926 issue Gernsback launched a competition to write a short story to suit a cover drawn by illustrator Frank R. Paul, with a first prize of $250. The competition drew over 360 entries, seven of which were eventually printed in Amazing. The winner was Cyril G. Wates, who sold three more stories to Gernsback in the late 1920s. Two other entrants went on to become successful writers: one was Clare Winger Harris, whose story, "The Fate of the Poseidonia", took third place in the competition, and was published in the June 1927 issue as by "Mrs. F.C. Harris". The other notable entrant was A. Hyatt Verrill, with The Voice from the Inner World, which appeared in July 1927.

A letter column, titled Discussions soon appeared, and became a regular feature with the January 1927 issue. Many science fiction readers were isolated in small communities, knowing nobody else who liked the same fiction. Gernsback's habit of publishing the full address of all his correspondents meant that the letter column allowed fans to correspond with each other directly. Science fiction fandom traces its beginnings to the letter column in Amazing and its competitors, and one historian of the field, author Lester del Rey, has commented that the introduction of this letter column "may have been one of the most important events in the history of science fiction". (Note: An example of one fan of the genre reaching out to others is a 1929 letter by Earl Hess of McIntyre, FL. An excerpt reads: "... my plea is for help in getting together an independent experimental station, your part to be the putting into the public view of my desire to get in touch with chaps who are of my caliber, who want the opportunity to follow their own inclinations undisturbed, and live healthily and well while doing so".)

For the first year, Amazing contained primarily reprinted material. It was proving difficult to attract new, high-quality material, and Gernsback's slowness at paying his authors did not help. Writers such as H.P. Lovecraft, H.G. Wells, and Murray Leinster all avoided Amazing because Gernsback took so long to pay for the stories he printed. The slow payments were probably known to many of the other active pulp writers, which would have further limited the volume of submissions. New writers did appear, but the quality of their stories was often weak.

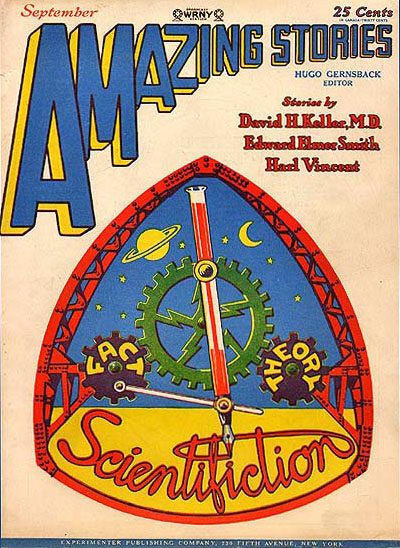
September 1928 issue. This sober design sold poorly and Gernsback returned to lurid action covers.

Frederik Pohl later said that Gernsback's magazine published "the kind of stories Gernsback himself used to write: a sort of animated catalogue of gadgets". Gernsback discovered that the audience he had attracted was less interested in scientific invention stories than in fantastical adventures. A. Merritt's The Moon Pool, which began serialization in May 1927, was an early success; there was little or no scientific basis to the story, but it was very popular with Amazing's readers. The covers, all of which were painted by Paul, were garish and juvenile, leading some readers to complain. Raymond Palmer, later to become an editor of the magazine, wrote that a friend of his was forced to stop buying Amazing "by reason of his parents' dislike of the cover illustrations". Gernsback experimented with a more sober cover for the September 1928 issue, but it sold poorly, and so the lurid covers continued. The combination of poor quality fiction with garish artwork has led some critics to comment that Gernsback created a "ghetto" for science fiction, though it has also been argued that the creation of a specialized market allowed science fiction to develop and mature as a genre.

Among the regular writers for Amazing by the end of the 1920s were several who were influential and popular at the time, such as David H. Keller and Stanton Coblentz, and some who would continue to be successful for much longer, most notably Edward E. Smith and Jack Williamson. Smith's The Skylark of Space, written between 1915 and 1920, was a seminal space opera that found no ready market when Argosy stopped printing science fiction. When Smith saw a copy of the April 1927 issue of Amazing, he submitted it to Sloane, and it appeared in the August–October 1928 issues. It was such a success that Sloane requested a sequel before the second installment had been published. It was also in the August 1928 issue that "Armageddon – 2419 AD", by Philip Francis Nowlan, appeared; this was the first appearance of Buck Rogers in print.

=== Sloane, Palmer, Browne and Fairman ===
Sloane took over full control of the content of Amazing when Gernsback left in 1929. He was infamous for his slow response to manuscripts, and when Astounding Stories was launched in January 1930, with better rates and faster editorial response, some of Sloane's writers quickly defected. Little of quality appeared in Amazing during Sloane's tenure, though "The Lost Machine", an early story by John Wyndham, appeared in April 1932, under Wyndham's real name of John Beynon Harris. John W. Campbell and Howard Fast sold their first stories to Sloane; Campbell's "When the Atoms Failed" appeared in the January 1930 issue, and Fast's "Wrath of the Purple" was printed in the October 1932 issue.

Raymond Palmer, who took over in 1938 after production of the magazine was moved to Chicago, was less interested in the educational possibilities of science fiction than Sloane had been. He wanted the magazine to provide escapist entertainment, and had no interest in scientific accuracy. His terse instruction—"Gimme Bang-Bang"—to one pulp writer sums up his approach. Palmer disposed of almost all of Sloane's accumulated inventory, instead acquiring stories from local Chicago writers he knew through his connections with science fiction fandom. He also added features such as a "Correspondence Corner" and a "Collectors' Corner" to appeal to fans, and introduced a "Meet the Authors" feature, though on at least one occasion the featured author was a pseudonym, and the biographical details were invented. An illustrated back cover was tried, and soon became standard. In 1939 Palmer acquired Isaac Asimov's first sale, "Marooned off Vesta".

In the 1940s, several writers established themselves as a stable of reliable contributors to Amazing. These included David Wright O'Brien and William P. McGivern, both of whom wrote an immense amount for Ziff-Davis, much of it under house names such as Alexander Blade. John Russell Fearn became a prolific contributor, using the pseudonyms "Thornton Ayre" and "Polton Cross". Palmer also encouraged long-time science fiction writers to return, publishing pulp authors such as Ed Earl Repp and Eando Binder. This policy did not always meet with approval from Amazing's readers, who, despite a clear preference for action and adventure stories, could not stomach the work of some of the early pulp writers such as Harry Bates.

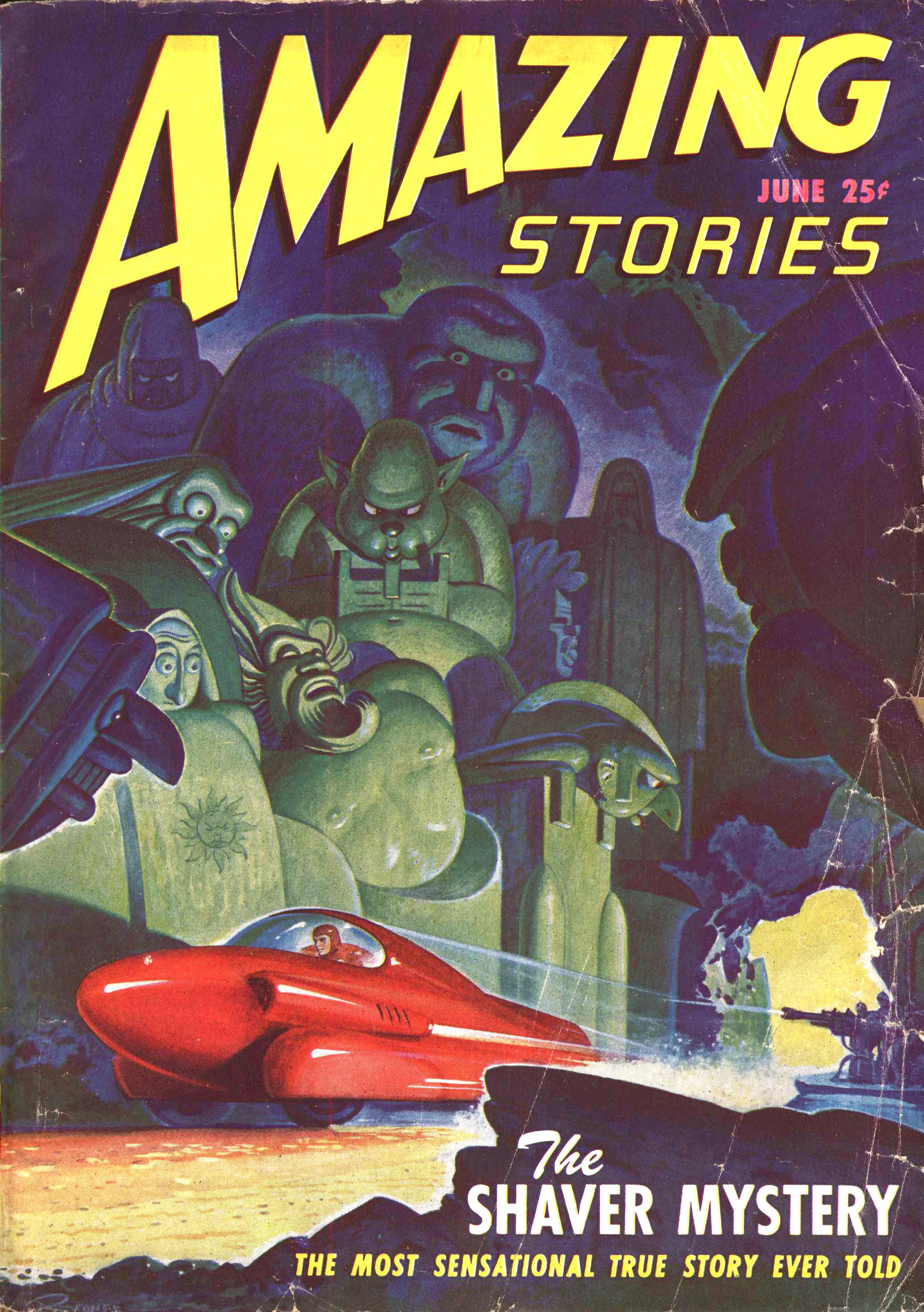
June 1947 issue of Amazing Stories, featuring the Shaver Mystery.

The first Shaver Mystery story, "I Remember Lemuria", by Richard S. Shaver, appeared in the March 1945 issue. Shaver claimed that all the world's accidents and disasters were caused by an ancient race of deros (short for "detrimental robots") who lived in underground cities. This explanation for the world's ills, coming towards the end of World War II, struck a chord with Amazing's readership. Palmer received over 2,500 letters, instead of the usual 40 or 50, and proceeded to print a Shaver story in every issue. The June 1947 issue was given over entirely to the Shaver Mystery. From March 1948 the Shaver Mystery was dropped as a regular feature of the magazine, at Ziff's insistence. Palmer left the following year, and Browne, his successor, "was determined to make sure that the lunatics were no longer in charge of the asylum", in the words of science fiction historian Mike Ashley.

Browne had acquired some good-quality material in the process of planning the launch of a new slick version of Amazing, and when the plan was abandoned this material appeared in the continuing pulp version. This included "Operation RSVP" by H. Beam Piper, and "Satisfaction Guaranteed" by Isaac Asimov. Despite the cancellation of the planned change to a slick format, news had reached the writing community of Amazing's new approach, and Browne began to receive much better material than Palmer had been able to publish. The existing stable of Amazing writers, such as Rog Phillips and Chester S. Geier, were replaced by writers such as Fritz Leiber, Fredric Brown, and Clifford D. Simak. Browne also discovered several writers who went on to success in the field, publishing first stories by Walter M. Miller, Mack Reynolds, John Jakes, Milton Lesser and Charles Beaumont, all within nine months in late 1950 and early 1951. Browne was disappointed by the cancellation of the planned slick version, and to some extent reverted to Palmer's policy of publishing sensational fiction. In 1952, for example, he serialized the anonymous Master of the Universe, which purported to be a history of the future from 1975 to 2575.

With the change to digest size in 1953, Browne once again attempted to use higher-quality fiction. The first digest issue, dated April–May 1953, included stories by Ray Bradbury, Robert Heinlein, Richard Matheson, Theodore Sturgeon, and Murray Leinster. Further well-regarded stories appeared over the course of 1953, including Arthur C. Clarke's "Encounter in the Dawn", and Henry Kuttner's "Or Else". Subsequent budget cuts meant that Browne was unable to sustain this level. As in the 1940s, Amazing gained a stable of writers who appeared frequently, though this time the quality of the writers was rather higher—it included Harlan Ellison, Robert Silverberg, and Randall Garrett—and the regular writers were not appearing only in Ziff-Davis magazines. This remained the situation after Browne's departure in 1956 and through Paul Fairman's tenure.

=== Cele Goldsmith ===
Cele Goldsmith's tenure as editor began with the opportunity to showcase two very well-established writers: E. E. Smith and Isaac Asimov. Smith's The Galaxy Primes was serialized from March to May 1959. Asimov's first published story "Marooned off Vesta" had appeared in the March 1939 Amazing, and Goldsmith reprinted it in March 1959 along with a sequel "Anniversary" and Asimov's comments. She soon began to publish some of the better new writers. Cordwainer Smith's "Golden the Ship Was—Oh! Oh! Oh!" appeared in April; and by the middle of the following year she had managed to attract stories from Robert Sheckley, Alan E. Nourse, Fritz Leiber, Gordon R. Dickson, Robert Bloch, and James Blish. The changes she made were enough to bring Robert A. Heinlein back as a subscriber; he read the June 1961 issue, which, he wrote to her, "caused me to think I had been missing something".

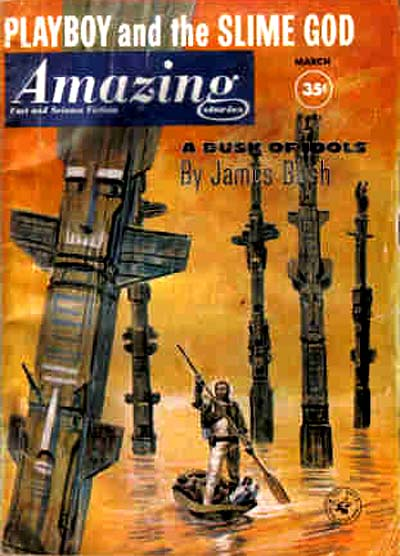
March 1961 cover by Leo Summers, featuring Blish's "A Dusk of Idols".

In September 1960, Amazing began to carry Sam Moskowitz's series of author profiles, which had begun in Fantastic, the sister magazine. The following month the cover and logo were redesigned. In April 1961, the 35th anniversary of the first issue, Goldsmith ran several reprints, including by Ray Bradbury and Edgar Rice Burroughs. Goldsmith had little previous experience with science fiction, and bought what she liked, rather than trying to conform to a notion of what science fiction should be. The result was the debut of more significant writers in her magazines than anywhere else at that time: she published the first stories of Ursula K. Le Guin, Roger Zelazny, Piers Anthony and Thomas M. Disch, among many others. Award-winning stories published during Goldsmith's editorship include Zelazny's "He Who Shapes", a novella about the use of dream therapy to cure phobias. It was serialized in the January and February 1965 issues, and won a Nebula Award from the newly established Science Fiction Writers of America. Goldsmith often wrote long, helpful letters to her authors: Zelazny commented in a letter to her that "most of anything I have learned was stimulated by those first sales, and then I learned, and possibly even learned more, from some of the later rejections". Disch and Le Guin have also acknowledged the influence Goldsmith had on their early careers; Le Guin called her in 1975 "as enterprising and perceptive an editor as the science fiction magazines ever had".

Goldsmith's open-minded approach meant that Amazing and Fantastic published some writers who did not fit into the other magazines. Philip K. Dick's sales to magazines had dropped, but his work began to appear in Amazing, and Goldsmith also regularly published David R. Bunch's stories of Moderan, a world whose inhabitants were part human and part metal. Bunch, whose stories were "bewildering, exotic word pictures" according to Mike Ashley, had been unable to sell regularly elsewhere.

The cover art for Amazing had been largely supplied by Ed Valigursky during the late fifties, but during the early sixties a much wider variety of artists appeared, including Alex Schomburg, Leo Summers and Ed Emshwiller. Frank Paul, who had painted all the covers for the first few years of Amazing, contributed a wraparound cover for the April 1961 35th anniversary issue; this was his last cover art for a science fiction magazine.

=== Reprint era and Ted White ===
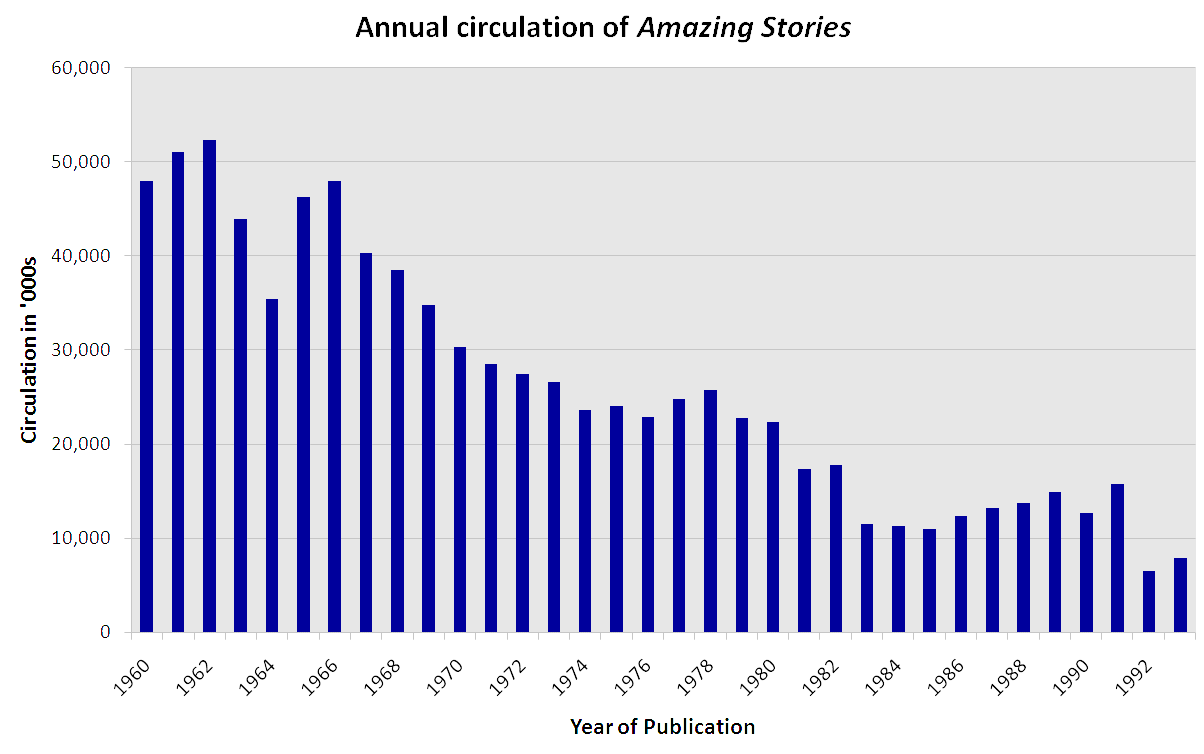
Annual circulation from 1960 to 1993.

When Sol Cohen bought both Amazing and Fantastic in early 1965, he decided to maximize profits by filling the magazines almost entirely with reprints. Cohen had acquired second serial rights from Ziff-Davis to all stories that had been printed in both magazines, and also in the companion magazines such as Fantastic Adventures. Joseph Wrzos, the new editor, persuaded Cohen that at least one new story should appear in each issue; there was sufficient inventory left over from Goldsmith's tenure for this to be done without acquiring new material. Readers initially approved of the policy, since it made available some well-loved stories from earlier decades that had not been reprinted elsewhere. Both of Wrzos's successors, Harry Harrison and Barry Malzberg, were unable to persuade Cohen to use more new fiction.

When Ted White took over, it was on condition that the reprints be phased out. This took some time: for a while both Amazing and Fantastic continued to include one reprint every issue; with the May 1972 issue the transformation was complete, and all stories were new. As well as eliminating the reprints, White reintroduced features such as a letter column and "The Clubhouse", a fanzine review and fannish news column. He continued the book review column, and a series of science articles by Gregory Benford and David Book. White also redesigned the look of the magazine, making it, in sf historian Mike Ashley's words, "far more modern and sophisticated".

White was willing to print a variety of fiction, mixing traditional stories with more experimental material that was influenced by the British New Wave or by 1960s psychedelia. In 1971, he serialized Ursula K. Le Guin's The Lathe of Heaven, about a man whose dreams can modify reality. One writer influenced by this was James Tiptree, Jr., who later wrote that "after first plowing into the first pulpy pages of the 1971 Amazing in which Lathe came out, my toe-nails began to curl under and my spine hair stood up". White's willingness to experiment led to Amazing running more stories with sexual content than other magazines. One such story, White's own "Growing Up Fast in the City", was criticized as pornographic by some of Amazing's readers. Other stories, such as Rich Brown's "Two of a Kind", about the violent rape of a black woman and the subsequent death of her rapists, also led to controversy. White printed more conventional fiction as well, much of it high quality. The magazine was nominated for the Hugo Award (a readers' award, named for Hugo Gernsback) for best editor three times during his tenure (1970, 1971 and 1972), finishing third each time.

White's ability to attract new writers suffered because of the low rates he paid: one cent per word, as compared to three or five cents per word at the leading competitive magazines. To compensate, White cultivated new writers whose experimental work was not selling elsewhere. He made a deal in 1971 with Gordon Eklund, who was hesitating to become a full-time writer because of the financial risks. White agreed to buy anything Eklund wrote, on condition that Eklund himself believed it was a good story. The result was that much of Eklund's fiction appeared in Amazing and Fantastic over the next few years.

Amazing's reputation had been for formulaic science fiction almost since it began, but White was able to take the magazine to a higher standard than any other editor except Cele Goldsmith, and gave Amazing a respected position in the field. His successors were not able to maintain the same level of quality.

=== After Ted White ===
When Elinor Mavor took over, in early 1979, she had no experience with science fiction magazines, and was unaware of the history of bad feeling within the science fiction community about the poor payments for reprinted stories. She was given an extremely limited budget to work with, and had few stories on hand to work with initially, and as a result her first issues contained several reprints. Mavor experimented in her first year with some new ideas, such as starting a story on the back cover in order to hook readers into buying the magazine to finish the story. She also began a serial story in graphic format that used reader input to continue its plot. It was not a success and "thankfully", according to Mike Ashley, the experiment was terminated after only three episodes.

Over time Mavor was to some extent able to reverse the negative perceptions of Amazing among established authors, but she was initially forced to work primarily with newer writers. Early discoveries of hers include Michael P. Kube-McDowell, John E. Stith and Richard Paul Russo. In a notice published in her first issue, she asked readers for help in assembling news, reviews and fan information, and soon added columns that covered these areas. In 1981 Robert Silverberg began a series of opinion columns. The artwork was of high quality, including work by Stephen Fabian, and later by David Mattingly.

After the merger with Fantastic, Mavor continued to draw well-known writers to the magazine, including Orson Scott Card, George R. R. Martin, and Roger Zelazny. Brad Linaweaver's Moon of Ice, which appeared in March 1982, was nominated for a Nebula Award; Martin's Unsound Variations, which had appeared the issue before, was nominated for both a Nebula and a Hugo award.

Historian James Gunn's assessment of Amazing in the 1980s is that Mavor, Scithers and Price, who between them edited Amazing for a decade, were unable to sustain the standards established by Ted White in the 1970s. Brian Stableford, by contrast, comments that both Scithers and Price made efforts to publish good material, and that the packaging, from 1991 onwards, was perhaps the best presented of any science fiction magazine.

With the Wizards of the Coast relaunch in 1998 the contents, under editor Kim Mohan, became more media-focused. The initial plan was to have two or three stories per issue based on films, TV, and games. The 600th issue, in early 2000, included a Harlan Ellison story, as well as a story from the 100th issue, the 200th issue, and so on, up to the 500th issue. Pamela Sargent also contributed a story. The Paizo publishing relaunch, in 2004, was even more focused on media content than the Wizards of the Coast version had been, with much more movie and comics-related material than science fiction. Several well-known authors appeared in the first issue, including Harlan Ellison, Bruce Sterling, and Gene Wolfe. Paizo also ran a blog for the magazine. The fiction received positive reviews, but Paizo soon put the magazine on temporary hold, and canceled it permanently the following year. The title remained in limbo until Steve Davidson's online version appeared in 2012.

=== Influence on the field ===
Amazing Stories was influential simply by being the first of its kind. In the words of science fiction writer and critic Damon Knight, the magazine was "a snag in the stream of history, from which a V-shape spread out in dozens and then in hundreds of altered lives". Many early fans of the field began to communicate with each other through the letter column, and to publish fanzines—amateur fan publications that helped establish connections among fans across the country. Many of these fans in turn became successful writers; and the existence of an organized science fiction fandom, and of writers such as Ray Bradbury, Arthur C. Clarke, and Isaac Asimov, who came to writing directly from fandom, can be dated to the creation of Amazing Stories. After the first few years, when there was little or no competition, Amazing Stories never again led the field in the eyes of critics or fans. Despite its long history, the magazine rarely contributed much to science fiction beyond the initial creation of the genre, though Gernsback himself is commemorated in the name Hugo, which is the almost universally used term for the World Science Fiction Society's annually presented Science Fiction Achievement Awards. Gernsback has also been called the "Father of Science Fiction" for his role in creating Amazing Stories.

== Publication details ==
=== Editors ===
Bibliographers do not always agree who should be listed as editor of any given issue of Amazing. For example, Gernsback was in control for the first three years, but Sloane performed all the editorial duties related to fiction, and he is sometimes described as the editor. Similarly, later editors were sometimes under the supervision of editorial directors. Bernard Davis held the title of "Editor" of all Ziff-Davis magazines when at that company, with the actual editing of the magazines done by respective "Managing Editors". The table below, and the charts above, generally follow the mastheads in the magazines, with short notes added. More details are given in the publishing history section, above, which focuses on when the editors involved actually obtained control of the magazine contents, instead of when their names appeared on the masthead.

- Hugo Gernsback (April 1926 – April 1929). Sloane performed almost all the editorial duties related to fiction.
- Arthur Lynch (May 1929 – October 1929). As under Gernsback, Sloane was essentially the editor during Lynch's tenure.
- T. O'Conor Sloane (November 1929 – May 1938)
- Raymond A. Palmer (June 1938 – December 1949)
- Howard Browne (January 1950 – August 1956). Fairman actually took over editorial duties with the May or June 1956 issue.
- Paul W. Fairman (September 1956 – November 1958)
- Cele Goldsmith Lalli (December 1958 – June 1965). Norman Lobsenz was introduced as editor, but in fact Cele Goldsmith did all the editorial work. When she married she used her married name of Cele Lalli.
- Joseph Ross (August 1965 – October 1967). A pseudonym for Joseph Wrzos.
- Harry Harrison (December 1967 – September 1968)
- Barry N. Malzberg (November 1968 – January 1969)
- Ted White (March 1969 – February 1979)
- Elinor Mavor (May 1979 – September 1982). From May 1979 to August 1981 Mavor used the pseudonym Omar Gohagen; subsequently she used her real name.
- George H. Scithers (November 1982 – July 1986)
- Patrick Lucien Price (September 1986 – March 1991)
- Kim Mohan (May 1991 – Winter 1995 and Summer 1998 – Summer 2000)
- Dave Gross (September 2004 – December 2004)
- Jeff Berkwits (January 2005 – March 2005)
- Steve Davidson (July 2012 – August 2018)
- Ira Nayman (August 2018 – November 2022)
- Lloyd Penney (November 2022 to present)

=== Other bibliographic details ===
Amazing began as a bedsheet format magazine and remained so until October 1933, when it switched to pulp size. With the April–May 1953 issue Amazing became a digest. Seven issues in the early 1980s, from November 1980 to November 1981, were a half-inch taller than the regular digest size, but thereafter the magazine reverted to the standard digest format. In May 1991 the magazine returned to a large format, but this lasted only until the Winter 1994 issue, and the next three issues were digest-sized again. When the magazine reappeared in 1998, it was in bedsheet format and remained that size until the very end. The last issue, March 2005, was distributed only as a PDF download, never as a physical magazine. The volume numbering contained some irregularities: the numbering given in the tables above appears to be in error for the period from 1979 to 1983, but in fact it is given correctly in the table. Vol. 27 no. 8 was a single issue, not two, as it seems to be from the table; it was dated Dec 1953/Jan 1954.

Issue publishers
Dates	Publisher
April 1926 – June 1929	Experimenter Publishing, New York
July 1929 – October 1930	Experimenter Publications, New York
November 1930 – September 1931	Radio-Science Publications, New York
October 1931 – February 1938	Teck Publishing Corporation, New York
April 1938 – February 1951	Ziff-Davis, Chicago
March 1951 – June 1965	Ziff-Davis, New York
August 1965 – February 1979	Ultimate Publishing, New York
May 1979 – June 1982	Ultimate Publishing, Scottsdale, Arizona
September 1982 – May 1985	Dragon Publishing, Lake Geneva, Wisconsin
July 1985 – Winter 1995	TSR, Lake Geneva, Wisconsin
September 2004 – March 2005	Paizo Publishing, Bellevue, Washington
July 2012 –	Experimenter Publishing Company LLC, Hillsboro, New Hampshire

The title of the magazine changed several times:

Dates	Title
April 1926 – February 1958	Amazing Stories
March 1958 – April 1958	Amazing Science Fiction
May 1958 – September 1960	Amazing Science Fiction Stories
October 1960 – July 1970	Amazing Stories
September 1970 – February 1979	Amazing Science Fiction Stories
May 1979 – August 1980	Amazing Stories
November 1980 – November 1984	Amazing Science Fiction Stories Combined with Fantastic
January 1985 – March 1985	Amazing Science Fiction Stories Combined with Fantastic Stories
May 1985 – January 1986	Amazing Science Fiction Stories
March 1986 – March 2005	Amazing Stories
July 2012 –	Amazing Stories

Two different series of reprints of Amazing appeared in the United Kingdom. First came a single undated issue from Ziff-Davis, in November 1946. In June 1950, Thorpe & Porter began a second series that lasted until 1954, and totalled 32 issues. The Ziff-Davis issue and the first 24 issues from Thorpe & Porter were pulp-sized; the last eight were digests. The Thorpe & Porter issues were undated, but the pulp issues were numbered from 1 to 24, and were initially bimonthly. The March 1951 issue was followed by April and November, however, and in 1952 issues appeared in February, March, April, June, July, September and November. 1953 saw nine pulp issues, omitting only March and May; and with December came the change to digest-size and a perfectly regular bimonthly schedule that lasted until February 1955. These last eight issues were numbered volume 1, numbers 1 to 8. There was also a Canadian edition, which lasted for 24 issues, from September 1933 to August 1935, from Teck Publications; these were identical to the US editions except that the front covers were overprinted with "Printed in Canada on Canadian Paper". A Japanese edition ran for seven issues in mid-1950, selecting stories from Fantastic Adventures as well as from Amazing.

From 1940 to 1943, and again from 1947 to 1951, copies of Amazing Stories were rebound, three at a time, and resold as Amazing Stories Quarterly. A total of 27 of these issues appeared; they should not be confused with the magazine of the same name which ran from 1928 to 1934 as a companion to Amazing Stories.

Several anthologies of stories from Amazing have been published, including:

Year	Editor	Title	Publisher
1967	Joseph Ross	The Best of Amazing	Belmont Books
1973	Ted White	The Best from Amazing Stories	Manor Books
1985	Isaac Asimov and Martin H. Greenberg	Amazing Stories: 60 Years of the Best Science Fiction	TSR
1986	Martin H. Greenberg	Amazing Stories: Vision of Other Worlds	TSR
1987	Martin H. Greenberg	Amazing Science Fiction Anthology: The Wonderful Years, 1926–1935	TSR
1987	Martin H. Greenberg	Amazing Science Fiction Anthology: The War Years, 1936–1945	TSR
1987	Martin H. Greenberg	Amazing Science Fiction Anthology: The Wild Years, 1946–1955	TSR
2014	Jean Marie Stine and Steve Davidson	The Best of Amazing Stories: The 1926 Anthology	Futures Past Editions
2014	Jean Marie Stine and Steve Davidson	Amazing Stories Giant 35th Anniversary Edition: Best of Amazing Stories Authorized Edition	Futures Past Editions
2015	Jean Marie Stine and Steve Davidson	The Best of Amazing Stories: The 1927 Anthology	Futures Past Editions
2015	Jean Marie Stine and Steve Davidson	The Best of Amazing Stories: The 1940 Anthology	Futures Past Editions
2016	Jean Marie Stine and Steve Davidson	The Best of Amazing Stories: The 1928 Anthology	Futures Past Editions
2017	Jean Marie Stine and Steve Davidson	The Best of Amazing Stories: The 1929 Anthology	Futures Past Editions

=== Media crossovers ===
Director Steven Spielberg licensed the title for the American anthology television series of the same name, which ran from 1985 to 1987. Apple TV+ produced a 2020 revival of the show, streaming five new episodes.

Between 1998 and 2000, Amazing Stories published a series of short stories based on the Star Trek franchise, later compiled and reissued in the 2002 Pocket Books collection Star Trek: The Amazing Stories.

== See also ==
- 1926 in science fiction

== Sources ==
- Aldiss, Brian; Wingrove, David (1986). Trillion Year Spree: The History of Science Fiction. London: Gollancz. ISBN 0-575-03943-4.
- Ashley, Mike (2000). The Time Machines: The Story of the Science-Fiction Pulp Magazines from the Beginning to 1950. Liverpool: Liverpool University Press. ISBN 0-85323-865-0.
- Ashley, Mike (2004). "The Gernsback Days". In Ashley, Mike; Lowndes, Robert A. W. (eds.). The Gernsback Days: A Study of the Evolution of Modern Science Fiction from 1911 to 1936. Holicong, Pennsylvania: Wildside Press. pp. 16–254. ISBN 0-8095-1055-3.
- Ashley, Mike (2005). Transformations: The Story of the Science-Fiction Magazines from 1950 to 1970. Liverpool: Liverpool University Press. ISBN 0-85323-779-4.
- Ashley, Mike (2007). Gateways to Forever: The Story of the Science-Fiction Magazines from 1970 to 1980. Liverpool: Liverpool University Press. ISBN 978-1-84631-003-4.
- Bleiler, Everett F.; Bleiler, Richard J. (1998). Science-Fiction: The Gernsback Years. Westport, Connecticut: Kent State University Press. ISBN 0-87338-604-3.
- Carter, Paul A. (1977). The Creation of Tomorrow: Fifty Years of Magazine Science Fiction. New York: Columbia University Press. ISBN 0-231-04211-6.
- Clute, John; Nicholls, Peter (1993). The Encyclopedia of Science Fiction. New York: St. Martin's Press. ISBN 0-312-09618-6.
- del Rey, Lester (1979). The World of Science Fiction: 1926–1976: The History of a Subculture. New York: Ballantine Books. ISBN 0-345-25452-X.
- Franson, Donald; DeVore, Howard (1978). A History of the Hugo, Nebula and International Fantasy Awards. Dearborn, Michigan: Misfit Press.
- Gunn, James (1988). The New Encyclopedia of Science Fiction. New York: Viking. ISBN 0-670-81041-X.
- Knight, Damon (1977). The Futurians. New York: John Day.
- "Amazing Stories Checklist". Stephen G. Miller and William T. Contento.
- Moskowitz, Sam (1959). Hugo Gernsback: Father of Science Fiction. New York: Criterion.
- Moskowitz, Sam (1966). Seekers of Tomorrow. World Publishing. ISBN 0-88355-129-2.
- Sanders, Joseph (1986). E. E. "Doc" Smith. Starmont House. ISBN 0-916732-73-8.
- Siegel, Mark Richard (1988). Hugo Gernsback: Father of Modern Science Fiction. Borgo Press. ISBN 0-89370-274-9.
- Tuck, Donald H. (1982). The Encyclopedia of Science Fiction and Fantasy. Vol. 3. Chicago: Advent: Publishers. ISBN 0-911682-26-0.
