= John E. Stith =

American novelist

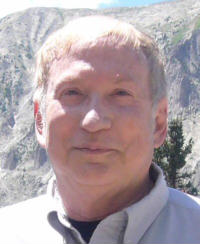
- Born: July 30, 1947 (age 79); Boulder, Colorado, United States
- Occupation: Novelist
- Writing career
- Genres: science fiction, mystery
- Website: www.neverend.com

John E. Stith (born 1947 in Boulder, Colorado) is an American science fiction and mystery author, known for the scientific rigor he brings to adventure and mystery stories.

Redshift Rendezvous, a Nebula Award nominee, is an action-thriller set aboard a space ship traveling through hyperspace, where the speed of light is ten meters per second, so relativistic effects occur at running speed. Manhattan Transfer, a novel about an alien abduction of the entire borough of Manhattan, was a Seiun Award nominee in Japan.

Stith's Nick Naught is a detective with a sense of humor in a dystopian future. He first appeared in Analog Magazine and his exploits (Naught for Hire and Naught Again) have been reprinted in the collection, All For Naught. Stith's other short fiction has appeared in Amazing Stories, Nature, and Dragon.

His work has been translated into French, German, Italian, Japanese, Portuguese, and Russian. His novels have been bestsellers on Locus and Amazon. He has lived in Colorado Springs since the 1970s.

Stith lived in Alamogordo, New Mexico from second grade through high school, with the exception of one year at Sunspot, New Mexico (when his father worked at Sacramento Peak Solar Observatory) and one year in Tucson, Arizona (when his father worked at Kitt Peak National Observatory). His father also worked at Holloman Air Force Base and White Sands Missile Range on projects including the rocket sled. In the 1950s, the neighbors a few houses down were Jim and Coral Lorenzen, who headed the Aerial Phenomena Research Organization (APRO).

== Bibliography ==
=== Novels ===
- Scapescope (1984)
- Memory Blank (1986)
- Death Tolls (1987)
- Deep Quarry (1989)
- Redshift Rendezvous (1990)
- Manhattan Transfer (1993)
- Reunion on Neverend (1994)
- Reckoning Infinity (1997)
- Pushback (2018)
- Disavowed (2024)

=== Novellas ===
- Naught for Hire (published in Analog, July, 1990)
- Tiny Time Machine (published by Amazing Stories, January, 2021) Amazing Stories notice of Tiny Time Machine publication.
- Tiny Time Machine 2: Return of the Father (published by Amazing Stories, April, 2023) Amazing Stories notice of Tiny Time Machine 2 publication.
- Tiny Time Machine 3: Mother of Invention (published by Amazing Stories, March, 2024) Amazing Stories notice of Tiny Time Machine 3 publication.

=== Novelettes ===
- Naught Again (published in Analog, November, 1992)

=== Collections ===
- All for Naught (2005)
- Tiny Time Machine: The Complete Trilogy (2024)

=== Major Awards ===
- 1988 Colorado Authors' League Top Hand Award Winner, best adult fiction original paperback, for Death Tolls
- 1989 Colorado Authors' League Top Hand Award Winner, best adult fiction original paperback, for Deep Quarry
- 1990 Nebula Award Nominee for Best Novel, for Redshift Rendezvous
- 1990 Analog Analytical Laboratory 3rd Place winner for the novella Naught for Hire
- 1990 HOMer Award winner for the novella Naught for Hire
- 1990 HOMer Award winner for the novel Redshift Rendezvous
- 1992 HOMer Award winner for the novelette Naught Again
- 1993 Rockies Award Winner for best SF novel of 1993, for Manhattan Transfer
- 1994 HOMer Award winner for the novel Reunion on Neverend
- 1994 Seiun Award Nominee for best foreign novel, for Manhattan Transfer (translated into Japanese by Takumi Shibano, who wrote under the name Rei Kozumi)
- 1997 Colorado Authors' League Top Hand Award Winner, best genre novel, for Reckoning Infinity
- 1997 New York Public Library—List of Best Books for Young Adult, for Reckoning Infinity
- 1997 La Tour Eiffel/Eiffel Tower Science Fiction Book Prize Nominee for Manhattan Transfer (translated into French by Maryvonne Ssossé)
- 2019 Daphne du Maurier Award for Excellence in Mystery/Suspense Nominee for Pushback in Mainstream Mystery/Suspense
- 2027 Golden Quill Award winner, presented by the Friends of the Pikes Peak Library

== Television appearances ==
- 1987 Science Fiction * Science Fact (SF2), National PBS one-hour, live special with Ben Bova, Arthur C. Clarke, Charles Sheffield, John E. Stith, G. Harry Stine and NASA planner Jesco von Puttkammer.
- 1993 Prisoners of Gravity Season 4 episode 16, Mystery/SF. Episode description: a look at the cross-over between mystery and science fiction, with guests P. D. James, John E. Stith, Sean Stewart, Vernor Vinge, Martin H. Greenberg, Maxim Jakubowski, Garfield and Judith Reeves-Stevens, Sharyn McCrumb, Mike Resnick, Beth Meacham, and Jane Yolen.

== Video Appearances ==
- Super Relaxed Fantasy Club featuring an excerpt from Tiny Time Machine and brief descriptions of a few favorite science-fiction books (2020)

== Selected Short Stories ==
- "Early Winter", Fantastic Science Fiction (July 1979)
- "Planet Seven", Amazing Stories (May 1980)
- "Camille", Pennywhistle Press (September 1982)
- "Out of Focus" with Annette Stith, Women's World (October 1, 1985)
- "Doing Time", Aboriginal Science Fiction (July–August 1987)
- "Little Black Book", Aboriginal Science Fiction (January-February 1988) and reprinted in Amazing Stories (Fall 2026)
- "MOlar 2-7734", Story (Spring 1989)
- Stith, John E. (September 2000). "When I was your age". Nature. 407 (6800): 23–23. doi:10.1038/35024172.
- Stith, John E. (15 July 2020). "Goodbye, Howard Henning". Nature. 583 (7816). doi:10.1038/d41586-020-02018-9.
- Stith, John E. (9 September 2020). "We Really Need Your Help, Bob". Daily Science Fiction.
- Stith, John E. (17 March 2021). "Chlorphyllis". Nature. 591 (7850). doi:10.1038/d41586-021-00713-9.
