= Clifford D. Simak bibliography =

Clifford D. Simak
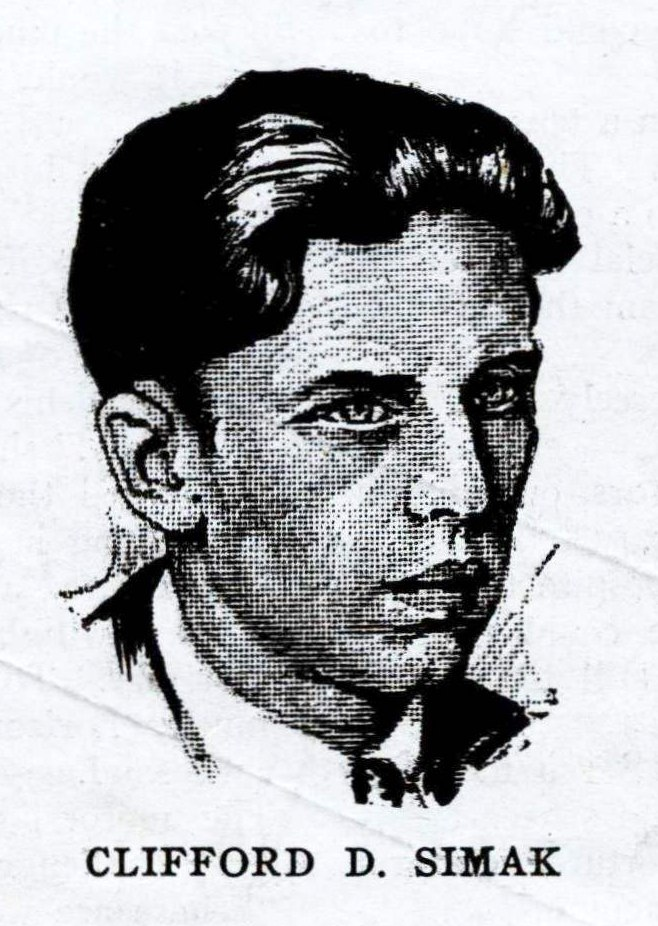
- Simak as pictured in Wonder Stories in 1931
- Born: Clifford Donald Simak; August 3, 1904; Millville, Wisconsin
- Died: April 25, 1988 (aged 83); Minneapolis, Minnesota, USA
- Occupations: Journalist, popular writer
- Writing career
- Period: 1931–1986 (fiction)
- Genres: Science fiction, fantasy
- Subject: Popular science

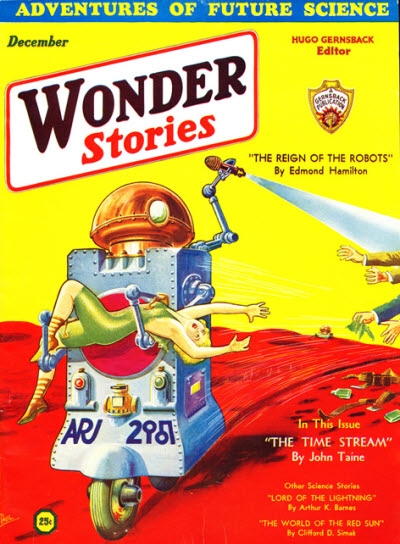
Simak's first story, The World of the Red Sun was listed on the cover of Wonder Stories in 1931.

The American science fiction writer Clifford D. Simak (August 3, 1904 – April 25, 1988) won three Hugo Awards and one Nebula Award. The Science Fiction Writers of America made him its third SFWA Grand Master and the Horror Writers Association made him one of three inaugural winners of the Bram Stoker Award for Lifetime Achievement.

== Novels ==
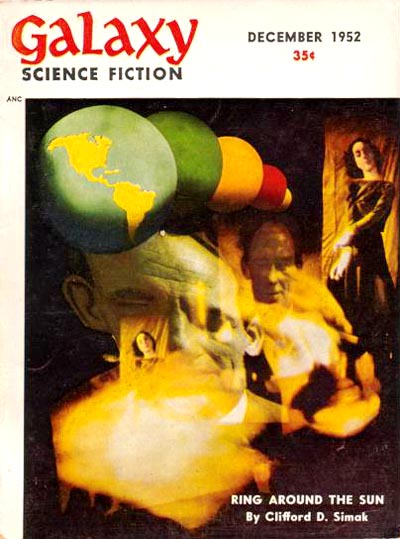
The first installment of Simak's Ring Around the Sun was cover-featured on the December 1952 issue of Galaxy Science Fiction.

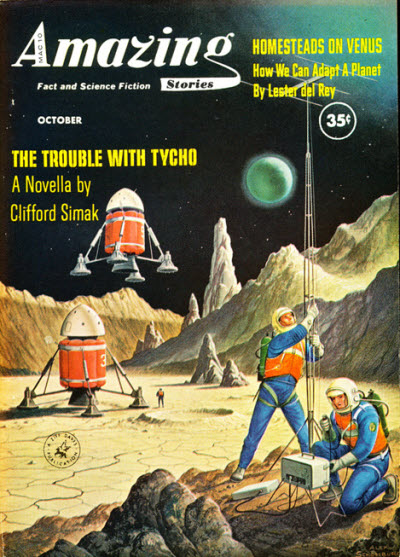
Simak's short novel The Trouble with Tycho took the cover of the October 1960 issue of Amazing Stories.

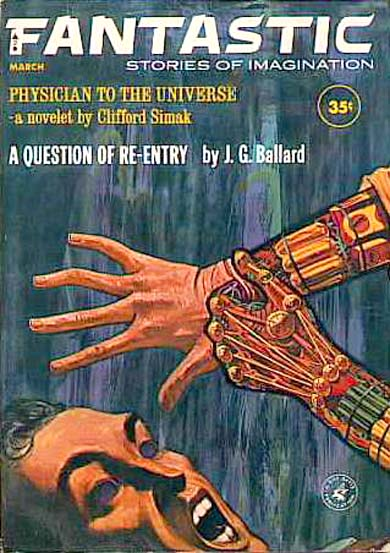
Simak's novelette "Physician to the Universe" was the cover story on the March 1963 issue of Fantastic.

- Cosmic Engineers (first published as a "short novel" in Astounding Science Fiction, February 1939, March 1939, and April 1939, expanded slightly for novel publication, 1950.) A crew is piped to the edge of known space, where metal-men Cosmic Engineers need help to prevent two universes from colliding, while opposing Hellhounds want destruction and chaos.
- Empire (1951) (Galaxy novel #7). A businessman's monopoly of accumulator engines brings power to run the solar system's politics. Until a physicist and entrepreneur develop a rival engine and declare a war for freedom.
- Time and Again (1951) Alternate paperback title: First He Died; serialized (with a different ending) as Time Quarry. When a long-lost spaceman returns to Earth from a distant planet where our "destiny" may live, his fuddled observations spark a time war between various factions over his work.
- City (1952) In the far future, only dogs and robots are left on Earth to recount the old stories and debate whether Man ever existed at all. "Epilog" was added in 1981.
- Ring Around the Sun (1953) A man's unique psychic gift allows him to step into parallel "quantum" earths—a ring around the sun—where he may become mankind's last chance for survival.
- Time is the Simplest Thing (1961) Serialized in Analog April, May, June, July 1961 as The Fisherman. A paranormal who telepathically travels to other planets brings back an alien consciousness that can manipulate time. He will need the help as humans rise to wipe out "parries".
- The Trouble with Tycho (1961) First published in Amazing Science Fiction, October 1960. A lunar prospector investigates the crater Tycho where spacecraft have disappeared.
- They Walked Like Men (1962) A newsman learns alien "bowling balls" that can take any form are buying up the Earth.
- Way Station (1963) Serialized in Galaxy Magazine June and August 1963 as Here Gather the Stars. 1964 Hugo Award Winner. A Civil War veteran is a caretaker of a secret Way Station, a transfer point for aliens. But the outside world is snooping around, and their blundering may endanger all of humanity.
- All Flesh Is Grass (1965) The town of Millville is trapped in a bubble by an alien hive-race of purple flowers. It has established a toehold for mutual cooperation—or invasion.
- Why Call Them Back From Heaven? (1967) A man becomes embroiled in a scandal at a wealthy cryonics corporation.
- The Werewolf Principle (1967) An astronaut returns to Earth with two different creatures trapped inside him, so in times of stress morphs into either a "werewolf" or an impregnable pyramid.
- The Goblin Reservation (1968) A traveler teleporting home learns he was murdered a week before by either sneaking aliens or their rivals, the leprechauns and trolls of the local reservation.
- Out of Their Minds (1970) A newsman is hunted by werewolves, dinosaurs, sea serpents, and other creatures from human imagination, and no one will tell him why.
- Destiny Doll (1971) Four humans explore the mysteries of an eerie deserted planet.
- A Choice of Gods (1972) After 99.99% of the human race has disappeared, people discover they have lifespans of five or six thousand years.
- Cemetery World (1973) Earth has been turned into a vast and silent cemetery. A composer and a treasure-hunter have come to venture past the walls into the wilderness, where they find renegades, war machines, steel wolves, and ghosts whispering answers.
- Our Children's Children (1974) Refugees from 500 years in the future arrive through time tunnels - and hard behind them come ravening monsters.
- Enchanted Pilgrimage (1975) When a scholar finds a hidden manuscript he sets out to discover the secrets of the wasteland, accompanied by fellow travelers who join him along the way.
- Shakespeare's Planet (1976) Two explorers, a robot, a warrior, and even an inky "pond" are stuck on a dead-end planet because the star-tunnel is locked. Yet something is about to happen.
- A Heritage of Stars (1977) In a primitive world where technology collapsed, a woodsrunner, a witch, and a frontiering robot seek answers at The Place of Going to the Stars.
- The Fellowship of the Talisman (1978) On a parallel Earth perpetually laid waste by the Harriers of the Horde, a young man must ferry what may be a true account of Jesus' teachings to distant London. He is helped by a lonely ghost, a goblin, a demon, and a warrior woman riding a griffin.
- Mastodonia (1978) (published as Catface in the UK, a considerably expanded and re-written version of Simak's 1955 short story "Project Mastodon" which was also broadcast on the X Minus One radio program). A cat-faced alien stranded in Wisconsin befriends locals, then time-engineers portals into prehistoric epochs. The locals start a tourism company for big-game hunters, and maybe a new country: Mastodonia.
- The Visitors (1980). Giant black boxes land on Earth to eat trees. Completely ignored, humans wonder if this is an invasion or something even more sinister.
- Project Pope (1981) On the planet End of Nothing, robots have labored a thousand years to build a computerized infallible pope to eke out the ultimate truth. Their work is preempted when a human Listener discovers what might be the planet Heaven.
- Where the Evil Dwells (1982) Adventurers seeking a lost fiancée and cathedral enter the Empty Lands, where even Roman Legions get slaughtered.
- Special Deliverance (1982) A college professor and other oddballs are dropped onto a bleak world near a giant blue cube - and no clue how to proceed.
- Highway of Eternity (1986) A man who can "step around a corner" gets scattered across time alongside futuristic refugees. All are fleeing super-advanced humans who have transcended into pure thought—and expect everyone else to come along.

== Collections ==
- City (1952) Contains "City", "Huddling Place", "Census", "Desertion", "Paradise", "Hobbies", "Aesop ", "The Simple Way".
- Strangers in the Universe (1956) Contains "Target Generation", "Mirage", "Beachhead", "The Answers", "Retrograde Evolution", "The Fence", "Shadow Show", "Contraption", "Immigrant", "Kindergarten" and "Skirmish".
- The Worlds of Clifford Simak (1960) Contains "Dusty Zebra", "Honorable Opponent", "Carbon Copy", "Founding Father", "Idiot's Crusade", "The Big Front Yard", "Operation Stinky", "Jackpot", "Death Scene", "Lulu", "Green Thumb" and "Neighbor".
- Aliens for Neighbours (1961) UK abridgment of The Worlds of Clifford Simak. Contains "Dusty Zebra", "Honorable Opponent", "Carbon Copy", "Idiot's Crusade", "Operation Stinky", "Jackpot", "Death Scene", "Green Thumb" and "Neighbor".
- All the Traps of Earth and Other Stories (1962) Contains "All the Traps of Earth", "Good Night, Mr. James", "Drop Dead", "No Life Of Their Own", "The Sitters", "Crying Jag", "Installment Plan", "Condition of Employment" and "Project Mastodon".
- Other Worlds of Clifford Simak (1962) Abridgment of The Worlds of Clifford Simak (1961). Contains "Dusty Zebra", "Carbon Copy", "Founding Father", "Idiot's Crusade", "Death Scene" and "Green Thumb".
- The Night of the Puudly (1964) Contains "The Night of the Puudly", "Crying Jag", "Installment Plan", "Condition of Employment" and "Project Mastodon".
- Worlds Without End (1964) Contains "Worlds Without End", "The Spaceman's Van Gogh" and "Full Cycle".
- Best Science Fiction Stories of Clifford D. Simak (1967) Contains "Founding Father", "Immigrant", "New Folks Home", "Crying Jag", "All the Traps of Earth", "Lulu" and "Neighbor".
- So Bright the Vision (1968) Contains "The Golden Bugs", "Leg. Forst.", "So Bright the Vision," and "Galactic Chest".
- The Best of Clifford D. Simak (1975) Contains "Madness from Mars", "Sunspot Purge", "The Sitters", "A Death in the House", "Final Gentleman", "Shotgun Cure", "Day of Truce", "Small Deer", "The Thing in the Stone" and "The Autumn Land".
- Skirmish: The Great Short Fiction of Clifford D. Simak (1977) Contains "Huddling Place", "Desertion", "Skirmish", "Good Night, Mr. James", "The Sitters", "The Big Front Yard", "All the Traps of Earth", "The Thing in the Stone", "The Autumn Land" and "The Ghost of a Model T".
- Brother And Other Stories (1986) Contains "Brother", "Over the River and Through the Woods", "Auk House" and "Kindergarten".
- The Marathon Photograph (1986) Contains "The Birch Clump Cylinder", "The Whistling Well", "The Marathon Photograph" and "The Grotto of the Dancing Deer". Introduction by Francis Lyall.
- Off-Planet (1989) Contains "Construction Shack", "Ogre", "Junkyard", "The Observer", "The World That Couldn't Be", "Shadow World" and "Mirage". Introduction by Francis Lyall.
- The Autumn Land and Other Stories (1990) Contains "Rule 18", "Jackpot", "Contraption", "Courtesy", "Gleaners" and "The Autumn Land".
- Immigrant and Other Stories (1991) Contains "Neighbor", "Green Thumb", "Small Deer", "The Ghost of a Model T", "Byte your Tongue!", "I am Crying All Inside" and "Immigrant". Introduction by Francis Lyall.
- The Creator and Other Stories (1993) Contains "The Creator", "Shotgun Cure", "All the Traps of Earth", "Death Scene", "Reunion On Ganymede", "The Money Tree", "Party Line", "The Answers" and "The Thing in the Stone".
- Over the River and Through the Woods: The Best Short Fiction of Clifford D. Simak (1996) Contains "A Death in the House", "The Big Front Yard", "Good Night, Mr. James", "Dusty Zebra", "Neighbor", "Over the River and Through the Woods", "Construction Shack" and "The Grotto of the Dancing Deer". Introduction by Poul Anderson.
- The Civilization Game and Other Stories (1997) Contains "Horrible Example", "The Civilisation Game", "Hermit Of Mars", "Masquerade", "Buckets Of Diamonds", "Hunch" and "The Big Front Yard".
- I Am Crying All Inside and Other Stories (The Complete Short Fiction of Clifford D. Simak Volume One) (2015)
  Contains “Clifford D. Simak: Grand Master Indeed!” (essay by David W. Wixon), "Installment Plan", "I Had No Head and My Eyes Were Floating Way Up in the Air", "Small Deer", "Ogre", "Gleaners", "Madness from Mars", "Gunsmoke Interlude", "I Am Crying All Inside", "The Call from Beyond", "All the Traps of Earth".
- The Big Front Yard and Other Stories (The Complete Short Fiction of Clifford D. Simak Volume Two) (2015)
  Contains “Clifford D. Simak: Learning All the Words” (essay by David W. Wixon), "The Big Front Yard", "The Observer", "Trail City's Hot-Lead Crusaders", "Junkyard", "Mr. Meek - Musketeer", "Neighbor", "Shadow World", "So Bright the Vision".
- The Ghost of a Model T and Other Stories (The Complete Short Fiction of Clifford D. Simak Volume Three) (2015)
  Contains “Clifford D. Simak and ‘City’: The Seal of Greatness” (essay by David W. Wixon), "Leg. Forst.", "Physician to the Universe", "No More Hides and Tallow", "Condition of Employment", "City", "Mirage", "The Autumn Land", "Founding Father", "Byte Your Tongue!", "The Street That Wasn't There", "The Ghost of a Model T".
- Grotto of the Dancing Deer and Other Stories (The Complete Short Fiction of Clifford D. Simak Volume Four) (2016)
  Contains “The Language of Clifford D. Simak” (essay by David W. Wixon), “Unsilent Spring”, “Day of Truce”, “Jackpot”, “Mutiny on Mercury”, “Hunger Death”, “Crying Jag”, “The Civilization Game”, “The Reformation of Hangman's Gulch”, “The Grotto of the Dancing Deer” and “Over the River and Through the Woods”.
- No Life of Their Own and Other Stories (The Complete Short Fiction of Clifford D. Simak Volume Five) (2016)
  Contains “Introduction: Clifford Simak's Country” (essay by David W. Wixon), “No Life of Their Own”, “Spaceship in a Flask”, “The Loot of Time”, “Huddling Place • [City]”, “To Walk a City's Street”, “Cactus Colts • non-genre”, “Message from Mars”, “Party Line”, “A Hero Must Not Die”, “The Space-Beasts”, “Contraption” and “The Whistling Well”.
- New Folks' Home and Other Stories (The Complete Short Fiction of Clifford D. Simak Volume Six) (2016)
  Contains “Introduction: The Names in Simak” (essay by David W. Wixon), “New Folks' Home”, “Second Childhood”, “The Questing of Foster Adams”, “Barb Wire Brings Bullets!”, “Worlds Without End”, “Hermit of Mars”, “Beachhead”, “Sunspot Purge”, “Drop Dead” and “Worrywart”.
- A Death in the House and Other Stories (The Complete Short Fiction of Clifford D. Simak Volume Seven) (2016)
  Contains “Introduction: The Misunderstood ‘Hiatus’” (essay by David W. Wixon), “Operation Stinky”, “Green Thumb”, “When It's Hangnoose Time in Hell”, “The Sitters”, “Tools”, “Target Generation”, “War Is Personal”, “Nine Lives”, “A Death in the House” and “The Birch Clump Cylinder”.
- Good Night, Mr. James and Other Stories (The Complete Short Fiction of Clifford D. Simak Volume Eight) (2016)
  Contains “Introduction: The Non-Fiction of Clifford D. Simak” (essay by David W. Wixon), “Good Night, Mr. James”, “Brother”, “Senior Citizen”, “The Gunsmoke Drummer Sells a War”, “Kindergarten”, “Reunion on Ganymede”, “Galactic Chest”, “Death Scene”, “Census” and “Auk House”.
- Earth for Inspiration and Other Stories (The Complete Short Fiction of Clifford D. Simak Volume Nine) (2016)
  Contains “Introduction: The Simak Westerns” (essay by David W. Wixon), “Earth for Inspiration”, “Idiot's Crusade”, “Hellhounds of the Cosmos”, “Honorable Opponent”, “Green Flight, Out!”, “Carbon Copy”, “The Asteroid of Gold”, “Good Nesters Are Dead Nesters!”, “Desertion”, “The Golden Bugs” and “Full Cycle”.
- The Shipshape Miracle and Other Stories (The Complete Short Fiction of Clifford D. Simak Volume Ten) (2017)
  Contains “Introduction: Little Things: The Way Clifford D. Simak Wrote” (essay by David W. Wixon), “The Money Tree”, “Shotgun Cure”, “Paradise”, “The Gravestone Rebels Ride by Night!”, “How-2”, “The Shipshape Miracle”, “Rim of the Deep”, “Eternity Lost” and “Immigrant”.
- Dusty Zebra and Other Stories (The Complete Short Fiction of Clifford D. Simak Volume Eleven) (2017)
  Contains “Introduction: Clifford D. Simak: Opinions of a Reticent Author” (essay by David W. Wixon), “Dusty Zebra”, “Guns on Guadalcanal”, “Courtesy”, “The Voice in the Void”, “Retrograde Evolution”, “Way for the Hangtown Rebel!”, “Final Gentleman” and “Project Mastodon”.
- The Thing in the Stone and Other Stories (The Complete Short Fiction of Clifford D. Simak Volume Twelve) (2017)
  Contains “Introduction: Clifford D. Simak: Seeker After the Truth” (essay by David W. Wixon), “The World of the Red Sun”, “The Thing in the Stone”, “Skirmish”, “Aesop”, “The Hangnoose Army Rides to Town!”, “Univac: 2200”, “The Creator”, “The Spaceman's Van Gogh”, “Hunch” and “Construction Shack”.
- Buckets of Diamonds and Other Stories (The Complete Short Fiction of Clifford D. Simak Volume Thirteen) (2023)
  Contains “Introduction: Clifford D. Simak: High Anxiety?” (essay by David W. Wixon), “Horrible Example”, “Lobby”, “The Trouble with Ants”, “Buckets of Diamonds”, “The Fighting Doc of Bushwack Basin”, “...And the Truth Shall Make You Free”, “Clerical Error”, “Shadow of Life”, “Infiltration” and “Marathon Photograph”.
- Epilog and Other Stories (The Complete Short Fiction of Clifford D. Simak Volume Fourteen) (2023)
  Contains “Introduction: Clifford D. Simak: Memory of Man” (essay by David W. Wixon), “Lulu”, “Smoke Killer”, “Shadow Show”, “Epilog”, “A Bomb for No. 10 Downing”, “Limiting Factor”, “Masquerade”, “The Fence”, “Rule 18”, “Mr. Meek Plays Polo” and “The World That Couldn't Be”.

== Science fiction short stories ==
The table is ordered by date; select an arrow to sort by another column.

Name	Magazine	Published	Notes
"The World of the Red Sun"	Wonder Stories	December 1931	Two friends use their time machine to go into the future, but travel further than they ever intended.
"Mutiny on Mercury"	Wonder Stories	March 1932	On that world of furnace heat and ultimate cold, three races struggled for supremacy.
"The Voice in the Void"	Wonder Stories Quarterly	Spring 1932	It is always dangerous for an outlander to become too interested in the sacred things of an alien race.
"Hellhounds of the Cosmos"	Astounding Stories	June 1932	Weird are the conditions of the interdimensional struggle faced by Dr. White's ninety-nine men.
"The Asteroid of Gold"	Wonder Stories	November 1932	Successful exploration of new lands must be made by young men in order to meet the numberless new conditions that arise and to take advantage of them.
"The Creator"	Marvel Tales, Volume 1, #4	March/April 1935	A physicist and a psychologist combine dreams and time to exit our universe - and find it threatened by a callous "creator".
"Rule 18"	Astounding Science Fiction	July 1938	Earth has lost at football to Mars for decades because men have grown soft. So the coach reaches back for real he-men - back 30,000 years.
"Hunger Death"	Astounding Science Fiction	October 1938	Iowa farmers on Venus and the "polka-dot weed" alone offered a cure for the deadly weapon of an ancient people.
"Reunion on Ganymede"	Astounding Science Fiction	November 1938	On Jupiter's desolate moon, two cantankerous veterans of the Earth-Mars War end up fighting shoulder-to shoulder against rampaging robots.
"The Loot of Time"	Thrilling Wonder Stories	December 1938	also known as "S.O.S in Time". Time travelers bring hunters back to prehistoric Britain, stumble on a treasure trove, and tangle with the looters who stole it.
"Cosmic Engineers"	Astounding Science Fiction	February, March, April 1939	A crew is piped to the edge of known space to help prevent two universes from colliding.
"Madness from Mars"	Thrilling Wonder Stories	April 1939	The fourth, and only, spaceship to return from Mars holds an insane crew and a Martian "furball".
"Hermit of Mars"	Astounding Science Fiction	June 1939	A woman dares two guides to trek into Madman's Canyon, where no one has ever escaped with their sanity.
"The Space-Beasts"	Astounding Science Fiction	April 1940	Amidst the deadly asteroid belt, prospectors are lured by impossible angels with devils' faces to be shipwrecked.
"Rim of the Deep"	Astounding Science Fiction	May 1940	
"Clerical Error"	Astounding Science Fiction	August 1940	On storm-ravaged Jupiter, a shipment of vital metal has crashed in a deep canyon, and only a cranky veteran can reach it.
"Sunspot Purge"	Astounding Science Fiction	November 1940	Two newspapermen fly into the future to report how sunspots have affected humanity.
"Masquerade"	Astounding Science Fiction	March 1941	also known as "Operation Mercury". The power station on Mercury tolerates the "Roman Candle" energy beings that cavort outside - until a crew member goes missing.
"Earth for Inspiration"	Thrilling Wonder Stories	April 1941	
"Spaceship in a Flask"	Astounding Science Fiction	July 1941	On Mercury, a newsman investigates why an old prospector was murdered for selling worthless "salts".
"The Street That Wasn't There"	Comet	July 1941	also known as "The Lost Street". Co-written with Carl Jacobi. A disgraced physicist watches his city disappear as people stop believing it exists.
"Tools"	Astounding Science Fiction	July 1942	The atmosphere of Venus is one vast intelligence without a physical body. It wonders what it could accomplish with tools - and then men arrive.
"Shadow of Life"	Astounding Science Fiction	March 1943	A long-lost Earthman returns to Mars with a dire warning the ghosts of Mars don't want revealed.
"Hunch"	Astounding Science Fiction	July 1943	A blind man and his alien seeing eye dog have only a hunch that an epidemic of insanity stems from a million-year-old war.
"Infiltration"	Science Fiction Stories	July 1943	A traveling carnival exhibits fake "Monsters of Mars", but in the show's wake livestock and crops die.
"Message from Mars"	Planet Stories	Fall 1943	Mars sends lily seeds to Earth. Earthmen risk death to reach Mars and find only flowers and robot bugs. Who sent the message?
"Ogre"	Astounding Science Fiction	January 1944	On a planet ruled by intelligent vegetables - music trees, rifle trees, and electro-vines - humans seeking to exploit the resources find themselves exploited.
"Lobby"	Astounding Science Fiction	April 1944	When corporate greed snuffs out the promise of free atomic power, a frail war veteran dares to change world government for good.
"City"	Astounding Science Fiction	May 1944	Since everyone moved to the country with their atomic generators and personal aircraft, the cities are largely abandoned. City councils will burn the remaining empty houses—unless someone has a better idea.
"Mr. Meek - Musketeer"	Planet Stories	Summer 1944	Touring the asteroid Juno, a bookkeeper mistaken for a gunman gets caught between criminals and a rampaging monster!
"Huddling Place"	Astounding Science Fiction	July 1944	Men left the cities for the comforts of home, and now cannot leave home—not even to save a life.
"Mr. Meek Plays Polo"	Planet Stories	Fall 1944	Touring the rings of Saturn, a bookkeeper runs into mathematically minded bugs and rough-and-tumble miners out to play space polo - with Meek as their star player!
"Census"	Astounding Science Fiction	September 1944	In the first census in 300 years, an enumerator discovers what may be the next step in human evolution.
"Desertion"	Astounding Science Fiction	November 1944	When yet another survey team fails to return from Jupiter's harsh surface, an aging administrator and his old dog volunteer for a biological conversion—with the promise to return quickly with information, if at all possible. (One of the first stories about Pantropy).
"Paradise"	Astounding Science Fiction	June 1946	A volunteer has returned from lizard-conversion on Jupiter (seen in "Desertion") with a promise of paradise.
"Hobbies"	Astounding Science Fiction	November 1946	While the last few humans kill time with hobbies, talking dogs and sentient robots explore uncharted sciences.
"Aesop"	Astounding Science Fiction	December 1947	Animals have inherited the world, and "cobblies" (other-dimensional demons) have come, so Jenkins the faithful butler takes the last remaining humans away.
"Eternity Lost"	Astounding Science Fiction	July 1949	A 500-year-old politician is denied any more life extensions, so plots to get even.
"Limiting Factor"	Startling Stories	November 1949	A survey team finds a shining planet is one vast computer, built to calculate - what?
"Bathe Your Bearings in Blood!"	Amazing Stories	1950	also known as "Skirmish". A newspaper reporter discovers machines are coming alive and revolting, the first skirmish in a war to come.
"The Call from Beyond"	Super Science Stories	May 1950	Shunned as a mutant, a man journeys to forbidden Pluto to learn the secrets of ancient creatures and humankind's destiny.
"Seven Came Back"	Amazing Stories	October 1950	also known as "Mirage". A stranded archeologist who befriends Martians is shown an ancient city that glitters like a mirage.
"The Trouble with Ants"	Fantastic Adventures	January 1951	also known as "The Simple Way". Evolved ants and their robot ants are building so fast they will cover the Earth, and there is no simple way to stop them.
"Second Childhood"	Galaxy Science Fiction	February 1951	
"Good Night, Mr. James"	Galaxy Science Fiction	March 1951	also known as "The Duplicate Man" and "The Night of the Puudly". A lethal alien puudly is loose and ready to breed. Mr. James hunts to kill it—or does he?
"You'll Never Go Home Again"	Fantastic Adventures	July 1951	also known as "Beachhead". A survey team brutally pacifies a toehold on an alien planet, then learns you can not plan for the unknown.
"Courtesy"	Astounding Science Fiction	August 1951	Planetary explorers succumb to a virus that does not afflict the local "savages" - except for one man who is polite.
"The Fence"	Space Science Fiction	September 1952	A man with a dismal PS (Personal Satisfaction rating) finds intrigue in an invisible fence that can not be crossed.
"And The Truth Shall Make You Free"	Future Science Fiction	March 1953	also known as "The Answers". A space wanderer finds the long-lost mutant strain of humans and the universal truths they uncovered.
"Retrograde Evolution"	Science Fiction Plus	April 1953	Spacefaring traders are stumped when an alien race evolves from savages to geniuses overnight. The roughly humanoid aliens are called "Googles" and live in 37 Google villages on the planet "Zan".
"Junkyard"	Galaxy Science Fiction	May 1953	Explorers touch down on a planet containing only a junked spaceship and a stone tower. Then they discover they cannot get leave because the engineers have forgotten how.
"Kindergarten"	Galaxy Science Fiction	July 1953	
"Worrywart"	Galaxy Science Fiction	September 1953	A newspaperman finds a recluse who can seemingly fix any problem just by wishing it better.
"Shadow Show"	Fantasy & Science Fiction	November 1953	A colony of scientists struggle to develop artificial life. For entertainment, they role-play in a neverending melodrama. Until art begins to imitate life.
"Contraption"	Star Science Fiction Stories	1953	A lonely farm boy finds friends in a broken flying saucer.
"The Questing of Foster Adams"	Fantastic Universe	August/September 1953	
"Spacebred Generations"	Science Fiction Plus	August 1953	also known as "Target Generation". A generation ship that's traveled for 1,000 years suddenly stops. Only one man, a "sinner" who can read books, will risk his life to complete the mission.
"Immigrant"	Astounding Science Fiction	March 1954	The planet Kimon is a galactic El Dorado. There are a few who do not dream of going there, and fewer still who make the grade, none return.
"Neighbor"	Astounding Science Fiction	June 1954	A newcomer to a run-down farm brings peace and prosperity to the community, but powerfully resists inquiries.
"Green Thumb"	Galaxy Science Fiction	July 1954	A county agent finds an alien plant hiding in his garden and learns why a "green thumb" is a blessing and a curse.
"Dusty Zebra"	Galaxy Science Fiction	September 1954	When common household items disappear from his desk top, a salesman seizes the opportunity to trade for alien what-nots.
"Idiot's Crusade"	Galaxy Science Fiction	October 1954	The village idiot has been possessed by an anthropologist alien, but now the idiot has ideas of his own.
"How-2"	Galaxy Science Fiction	November 1954	Novella illustrated by Emsh. Due to a mix-up, a hobbyist builds a smart kit-robot that makes more robots - and sparks a robot revolution.
"Project Mastodon"	Galaxy Science Fiction	March 1955	Going back 50,000 years in time, opportunists found "Mastodonia" to make millions selling access to their country and its resources.
"Full Cycle"	Science Fiction Stories	November 1955	An out-of-work history teacher buys a trailer and becomes a nomad—as has everyone else—but conceives an idea how to improve life for everyone.
"Worlds Without End"	Future #31	1956	When the Director of Dreams mysteriously dies, a bureaucrat is promoted - into a conspiracy.
"The Spaceman's Van Gogh"	Science Fiction Stories	March 1956	A seeker finds the final resting place of a famous painter who saw something no one had ever seen before.
"Drop Dead"	Galaxy Science Fiction	July 1956	An agricultural survey team on a new planet finds a one-stop-shopping animal that could end hunger. Dare they eat it?
"So Bright the Vision"	Fantastic Universe	August 1956	A luckless writer cannot afford a new "yarner" machine to create stories until he finds an alien "blanket" that grants him visions.
"Honorable Opponent"	Galaxy Science Fiction	August 1956	The alien "Flyers" are winning the war, and Earth's leaders cannot even guess their objective.
"Galactic Chest"	Science Fiction Stories	September 1956	A frustrated newsman attributes local serendipities to brownies, then gets a surprise.
"Jackpot"	Galaxy Science Fiction	October 1956	Shoestring salvagers hit the jackpot when they discover a galactic library, but soon learn a little knowledge is a dangerous thing.
"Operation Stinky"	Galaxy Science Fiction	April 1957	An old codger finds a skunk with peculiar abilities and is soon in hot water with the local Air Force commander.
"Founding Father"	Galaxy Science Fiction	May 1957	A lonely colonist is responsible for raising one thousand embryos on a distant planet, but he's no longer sure what's real.
"Lulu"	Galaxy Science Fiction	June 1957	Lulu, a Planetary Exploration Robot, develops the heart and soul of a woman - and ambitious plans for her three-man crew.
"Shadow World"	Galaxy Science Fiction	September 1957	On an alien planet, a construction crew is pestered by "Shadows" that copy everything they do - literally.
"Death Scene"	Infinity Science Fiction	October 1957	Everyone on Earth gains the power to see a day into the future, but some visions are better not seen.
"Carbon Copy"	Galaxy Science Fiction	December 1957	A real estate salesman is making a fortune leasing houses to families — except the houses remain empty.
"Nine Lives"	Short Stories: A Man's Magazine	December 1957	Scientists struggle to understand time travel to survive intergalactic war - and fear panicked insanity may be the only path.
"The World That Couldn't Be"	Galaxy Science Fiction	January 1958	A plantation owner on an alien world tracks the strange animal Cytha and gets a lesson in xeno-ecology.
"Leg. Forst."	Infinity Science Fiction	April 1958	A skinflint stamp dealer discovers an alien stamp is reorganizing his collection—and himself.
"The Sitters"	Galaxy Science Fiction	April 1958	A prodigal-son spaceman brought home gentle alien "Sitters" to raise the town's children — except they do not remain children.
"The Money Tree"	Venture Science Fiction	July 1958	A sharper goes hunting a money tree and stumbles on an opportunity to benefit all mankind.
"The Big Front Yard"	Astounding Science Fiction	October 1958	When a spatial gateway splits his house and opens onto another world, a Yankee trader drives in to explore and to dicker with the locals. Winner 1959 Hugo for Best Novelette.
"The Civilization Game"	Galaxy Magazine	November 1958	On the neglected backwater Earth, people preserve mankind's greatest arts such as sculpture, music, and religion but also war, politics, and assassination.
"Installment Plan"	Galaxy Magazine	February 1959	A work gang shows up on a remote planet to collect the harvest of podars needed for medicine, but the natives would not sell.
"No Life of Their Own"	Galaxy Magazine	August 1959	Novella illustrated by Wally Wood. Aliens are settling local farms, so Steve plays with kids nicknamed Fancy Pants, Nature Boy, and Butch. Quarrels escalate when one boy goes missing, and only kids can see the ghostly "Halflings" who hold him!
"A Death in the House"	Galaxy Magazine	October 1959	A hillman finds a smashed spaceship and a dying alien, and buries it. Then is visited again.
"Final Gentleman"	Fantasy & Science Fiction	January 1960	An oracle computer seems to be steering humanity's destiny, and a defamed writer does not like it.
"Crying Jag"	Galaxy Magazine	February 1960	A visiting alien latches onto people to hear their sad stories.
"All the Traps of Earth"	Fantasy & Science Fiction	March 1960	A runaway robot gains the ability to telekinetically fix any problem, yet cannot fix his own problem: the need to be needed.
"Gleaners"	IF	March 1960	The put-upon director of Past, Inc. sends out operatives to cherry-pick treasures from the past, until some oddly prescient folk in his office suggest another way.
"Condition of Employment"	Galaxy Magazine	April 1960	Only homesickness can induce spacemen to risk their lives, so it's induced.
"The Golden Bugs"	Fantasy & Science Fiction	June 1960	An insurance salesman finds an agate boulder in his garden and his house full of golden (alien?) ladybugs.
"Shotgun Cure"	Fantasy & Science Fiction	January 1961	An alien gives a country doctor a vaccine to wipe out mankind's diseases, including a few we never recognized.
"Horrible Example"	Analog Science Fiction	March 1961	A frustrated robot plays the role of a town drunk, then one night steps outside his programming.
"The Shipshape Miracle"	IF	January 1963	A slippery character stranded on a remote planet is rescued by a mysterious black ship.
"Day of Truce"	Galaxy Magazine	February 1963	The local "Punks" take advantage of the once-a-year truce to ransack the last fortified house in the suburbs.
"Physician to the Universe"	Fantastic Science Fiction	March 1963	When health and hygiene are made mandatory, an inventor is consigned to a dismal remote "limbo" to die.
"A Pipeline to Destiny"	HKLPLOD #4	Summer 1963	
"New Folk's Home"	Analog Science Fiction	July 1963	A retired law school dean stumbles upon a house constructed just for him, in exchange for his services.
"Small Deer"	Galaxy Magazine	October 1965	A tinkerer fires up a time machine and learns what killed off the dinosaurs — and may come back.
"Over the River and Through the Woods"	Amazing Stories	May 1965	A farm family c. 1900 is visited by their great-great-great-grandchildren.
"Buckets of Diamonds"	Galaxy Magazine	April 1969	First Uncle George mysteriously "finds" a pile of treasures, then a mysterious evangelist commands he throw it all away!
"I Am Crying All Inside"	Galaxy Magazine	August 1969	The smart and rich people of Earth have left, along with their smart machines, leaving behind the rest.
"The Thing in the Stone"	IF (Worlds of If Science Fiction)	March 1970	A man who suffered brain damage can see the ancient past and hear the traffic of the stars - and the creature trapped under a mountain.
"The Autumn Land"	Fantasy & Science Fiction	October 1971	An engineer drifting through life finds himself trapped in a village where nothing ever happens.
"To Walk a City's Street"	Infinity #3	1972	Agents guide a mutant through pestholes where he cures all diseases - until recently.
"The Observer"	Analog Science Fiction	May 1972	A disembodied mind awakes on a planet to explore, but cannot recall why.
"Construction Shack"	Worlds of If	January/February 1973	A crewed expedition to Pluto finds it's not a planet, but a hollow metal sphere.
"UNIVAC: 2200"	Frontiers 1: Tomorrow's Alternatives	1973	
"The Marathon Photograph"	Threads of Time	1974	Back in the hills, two scientists find a body and a hologram-photo of the Battle of Marathon - and sinister strangers hunting both.
"The Birch Clump Cylinder"	Stellar #1	1974	A sputtering "time engine" has fallen onto the grounds of an old college, and an alumnus is asked to turn it off - with no idea what might happen.
"Epilog"	Astounding: J.W. Campbell Memorial Anthology	November 1973	Humans, animals and even ants are gone, so it is time for Jenkins the robot to go too.
"The Ghost of a Model T"	Epoch	1975	A lonely old man gets one last ride through his happy youth.
"Senior Citizen"	Fantasy & Science Fiction	October 1975	
"Unsilent Spring"	Stellar #2	1976	A country doctor suspects an epidemic of malaise is due to a lack(?) of DDT. Co-written with Richard Simak.
"Auk House"	Stellar #3	1977	An artist enters a remote house only to learn it actually sits in prehistoric North America, with no way back.
"Brother"	Fantasy & Science Fiction	October 1977	
"Party Line"	Destinies	1978	Volunteers risk their sanity by sending their minds into the void to query alien intelligences.
"Grotto of the Dancing Deer"	Analog Science Fiction	April 1980	An archeologist discovers ancient cartoon-like cave paintings and the artist who painted them. Winner of Hugo and Nebula Awards for Best Short Story 1981.
"The Whistling Well"	Dark Forces	1980	A genealogist unearths his ancestral home and wonders if dinosaurs had gods.
"Byte Your Tongue!"	Stellar #6: Science-Fiction Stories	1981	
"I Had No Head and My Eyes Were Floating Way Up in the Air"	I am Crying All Inside and Other Stories	2015	Originally written in 1973 for Harlan Ellison's never-published anthology The Last Dangerous Visions. After being rebuilt as an alien monster, a human astronaut plans revenge against his alien tormentors.

== Western short stories ==
Simak wrote a few Western pulp stories.

Name	Magazine	Published	Notes
"Smoke Killer"	Lariat Story Magazine	May 1944	
"Cactus Colts"	Lariat Story Magazine	July 1944	A two-gun drifter is mistaken for an outlaw and hired by two robber barons to kill each other.
"Trail City's Hot-Lead Crusaders"	New Western Magazine	September 1944	
"Gravestone Rebels Ride by Night"	Big Book Western Magazine	October 1944	
"Fighting Doc of Bushwhack Basin"	.44 Western Magazine	November 1944	A doctor sick of patching "nesters" goes to war with a cattle baron who wants the entire valley.
"The Reformation of Hangman's Gulch"	Big Book Western Magazine	December 1944	
"Way for the Hangtown Rebel"	Ace-High Western Stories	May 1945	
"Good Nesters are Dead Nesters"	.44 Western Magazine	July 1945	
"The Hangnoose Army Rides to Town"	Ace-High Western Stories	September 1945	
"Barb Wire Brings Bullets"	Ace-High Western Stories	November 1945	
"The Gunsmoke Drummer Sells a War"	Ace-High Western Stories	January 1946	A roving peddler tangles with county politics, feuding bandits, a mysterious letter, a grizzled trapper, and a dapper assassin to rescue his kidnapped girl.
"No More Hides and Tallow"	Lariat Story Magazine	March 1946	
"When it's Hangnoose Time in Hell"	.44 Western Magazine	April 1946	A riverboat gambler tackles a tough town to untangle the fate of his missing friend and hard-won fortune.
"Gunsmoke Interlude"	Ten Story Western	October 1952	

== War short stories ==
Simak wrote a few war stories during World War II.

Name	Magazine	Published	Notes
"A Bomb for No. 10 Downing"	Sky Fighters	September 1942	
"A Hero Must Not Die"	Sky Raiders	June 1943	A pilot who bailed and burned fears he's grown cautious when reckless courage is needed.
"Green Flight, Out!"	Army-Navy Flying Stories	Fall 1943	
"Guns on Guadalcanal"	Air War	Fall 1943	
"War is Personal"	Army-Navy Flying Stories Vol. 4 No. 3	Winter 1944	Piloting in the Pacific, Lt. Hart treats war like an engineering exercise; until he's forced down and captured, and slapped across the face.
"War is Personal" (reprint)	American Eagles (U.K)	Aug 1945	

== Non-fiction books ==
- The Solar System: Our New Front Yard (1962)
- Trilobite, Dinosaur, and Man: The Earth's Story (1965)
- Wonder and Glory: The Story of the Universe (1969)
- Prehistoric Man: The Story of Man's Rise to Civilization (1971)

== Edited books ==
- From Atoms to Infinity: Readings in Modern Science (1965)
- The March of Science (1971)
- Nebula Award Stories 6 (1971)

== Film adaptations ==
- "Good Night, Mr. James" was adapted as "The Duplicate Man" on The Outer Limits in 1964. Simak notes this is a "vicious story — so vicious that it is the only one of my stories adapted to television."
- Notwithstanding Simak's quote, three other Simak stories were adapted for television, one on two separate occasions. "Immigrant" and "Target Generation" were adapted for the 1962 UK anthology series Out of This World, and in 1969 "Beach Head" and "Target Generation" (again) were adapted for the third season of the UK anthology series Out of the Unknown. These series were never shown in the US, and it's doubtful Simak ever saw them. All four episodes were wiped sometime in the 1970s, and are believed lost.

== Audiotapes ==
- Clifford D. Simak; Over the River and Through the Woods (read by Jonathan Frakes) (1995)
