= SDLP (disambiguation) =

SDLP may refer to:

- Social Democratic and Labour Party, a political party of Northern Ireland
- Service de la protection, a unit of the French National Police
- Stanford Digital Library Project, a research programme from the mid 1990s to mid 2000s

== See also ==
- SDLP Youth, the youth wing of the Social Democratic and Labour Party of Northern Ireland
