= Albert Lambert =

Albert Lambert may refer to:

- Albert Edward Lambert (1869–1929), British architect
- Albert Bond Lambert (1875–1946), American golfer and benefactor of aviation
- Albert Lambert, fictional artist in The Goblin Reservation by Clifford D Simak
