= Huddling Place =

- Short story by Clifford D. Simak
- Language: English
- Genre: Science fiction

Publication
- Published in: Astounding Science Fiction
- Publication date: 1944
- Publication place: United States
- Media type: Print (magazine)

"Huddling Place" is a science fiction short story by American writer Clifford D. Simak, originally published in 1944 in Astounding Science Fiction. It is one of several linked stories collected in City.

"Huddling Place" was among the stories selected in 1970 by the Science Fiction Writers of America as one of the best science fiction short stories published before the creation of the Nebula Awards. As such, it was published in The Science Fiction Hall of Fame Volume One, 1929-1964.

== Plot summary ==
The story is lightly plotted, and most of the text is devoted to setting the scene. In the distant future, humans have colonized Mars and live an apparently easy life, supported by efficient and intelligent robots. Intelligent Martians co-exist with the humans on that planet. The trend to suburbanization, first manifested in the mid-20th century, has continued such that many humans on Earth live in isolated enclaves. Jerome Webster, the main character, is a human living on Earth with expertise in Martian physiology, especially that of the brain. Like other human adults, he has progressive agoraphobia, which becomes extreme after his only son departs to spend time on Mars. Jenkins, the senior family robot, explains to Webster that his father had been similarly afflicted. Webster contemplates writing a monograph on the subject.

Before he can begin this project, he learns that Juwain, a Martian friend and brilliant philosopher, requires surgery that only Webster can perform. This would require traveling to Mars, something his agoraphobia makes nearly impossible. Senior political figures make clear that Juwain's death would be a tragedy for which humankind would suffer for thousands of years, and Webster is pained by the thought of forsaking his friend.

With great effort he packs for the trip, only to discover that the robot Jenkins, not understanding the stakes, had dismissed the spaceship that had arrived to transport Webster to Mars. Webster feels as if his home has now become a trap from which he will never escape.
