= The Visitors (novel) =

1980 novel by Clifford D. Simak

- First edition, published by Del Rey.
- Author: Clifford D. Simak
- Language: English
- Publication date: 1980

The Visitors is a 1980 science fiction novel by American author Clifford D. Simak. It is based on a similar story of the same name, which was published in serial form in Analog magazine.

== Plot summary ==
The story outlines contact between Earth and the eponymous Visitors, a group of mysterious objects from deep space. The Visitors are simple black oblong boxes, as large as buildings, which approach from space and orbit the Earth before descending to the United States. The nature of the visitors is kept rather mysterious — it is not clear if they are vehicles or living things in their own right. They are apparently unable to communicate with humans in any meaningful way; on one occasion a human is taken inside a Visitor, only to be released after experiencing a jumble of confusing colored lights and smells which he did not understand.

The Visitors are composed largely of a dense form of cellulose, and they proceed to consume a quantity of trees and plant life in the US. Eventually, they start producing vehicles, superficially resembling human cars but capable of flying using the same unknown principles as the Visitors themselves, and apparently incorporating some element of intelligence, or at least instinct, since they do not crash into things as they move. The humans assume that the Visitors have created these vehicles as a gift in return for the plant matter which the Visitors are consuming, and the novel touches on the disruption such well-meaning gifts might incur on the Earth's economic systems. Toward the end of the book, the Visitors also start producing housing units for humans, and it is even implied that something living may be inside them — perhaps even a Visitor-produced version of humans themselves.

== Themes ==
On one level, the novel describes how communication between human and alien intelligences could well be very limited if both parties are genuinely different in psychology and physical form. Humans spend the novel largely puzzled by the Visitors' nature and motivations, and the Visitors seem to lack any real understanding of humans. Neither side ever makes any meaningful communication with the other, and the only real outcome of the contact is considerable frustration and the potential of large-scale damage to Earth's economic systems. The idea of aliens' disrupting human economies also features in the author's earlier novels Ring Around the Sun (1953), They Walked Like Men (1962), and All Flesh Is Grass (1965). The book invites comparisons to the long-term effects on the US society of the Visitors' practices, with the experiences of indigenous populations whose traditional ways of life were incompatible with the practices of European colonists.

== Reception ==
Rosemary Herbert in her review for the Library Journal wrote that Simak has "produced one of the most engaging novels of alien invasion ever written".
