= Ring Around the Sun =

Ring Around the Sun may refer to:

- Ring Around the Sun (short story), a science fiction short story by Isaac Asimov
- Ring Around the Sun (novel), a science fiction novel by Clifford D. Simak
