= Shakespeare's Planet =

1976 novel by Clifford D. Simak

- First edition (publ. Putnam); Cover art by Paul Lehr
- Author: Clifford D. Simak
- Language: English
- Publication date: 1976

Shakespeare's Planet is a 1976 science-fiction novel by Clifford D. Simak.

== Plot ==
Carter Horton and three other crew members are sent on an interstellar mission to find a planet which would be suitable for human life. They are put into suspended animation until they arrive. However, due to a systems malfunction, Carter is the last one left alive. When he reaches the planet he finds that he has been in deep sleep for about 1,000 years. The ship is controlled by the minds of three volunteers, a monk, a scientist and a grande dame, who gave up their bodies as a way to control the ship.

Upon awakening, Carter finds that the ship refuses to return to Earth. He meets the ship's robot, Nicodemus, but the only living thing he encounters is the alien Carnivore, who claims he came there through a time tunnel. He also says that he had a previous companion on the planet, a human named Shakespeare. Shakespeare took his name from a book of plays.

Others arrive via the time tunnel, but it is much more difficult to leave the planet in that manner. Several other alien species are also discovered living on the planet.

== Review ==
SF Book Reviews found the book lacked action and was more interested in character actions or reactions to each other or their surroundings. Ideas were presented by the spaceship's three minds or personalities in their own private discourses.
