= Pantropy =

Hypothetical process of space colonization

Pantropy is a hypothetical process of space habitation or space colonization in which, rather than terraforming other planets or building space habitats suitable for human habitation, humans are modified (for example via genetic engineering) to be able to thrive in the existing environment.

The term, meaning 'changing everything', was coined in 1942 by science fiction author James Blish, who wrote a series of short stories based on the idea (collected in the anthology The Seedling Stars). This was also the year when the term terraforming was coined, an alternative to pantropy, but sometimes envisioned as substituted by pantropy.

Critically, some form of pantropy, particularly as a means for labour, has been analyzed as potentially exiling people by limiting them to extraterrestrial environments. Despite suggestions that humans should live and reproduce extraterrestrially to safeguard its survival in case of planetary extinction, it has been questioned whether a significantly-altered or mutated human living extraterrestrially would still fulfil the purpose of survival of the human species alongside culture, knowledge and intellect.

== Fictional depictions ==
- 1944—One of the first science fiction stories about pantropy was the short story "Desertion," by Clifford D. Simak, which appeared in the November 1944 Astounding Science Fiction. In this story, human colonists living in a domed city on the planet Jupiter are put through a biological converter that converts their bodies into the form of the indigenous Jovian lifeform called the "Lopers." The head director of the domed colony, Kent Fowler, wondering why none of those biologically converted ever come back, goes into the biological converter himself with his dog and finds that the reason they never come back is that the Lopers have brains and senses so much in advance of humans that they don't want to come back. He also finds that he is able to completely accurately telepathically communicate with his dog Towser (whose intelligence has also greatly increased) after going through the converter. He himself decides not to go back. The story was incorporated into the novel City (1952).
- 1976— Frederik Pohl's novel Man Plus, describing a government project to alter humans to live on the surface of Mars
- 2002—Timothy Zahn's novel Manta's Gift features technology capable of transmitting human consciousness to an alien body.
