= The Werewolf Principle =

1967 novel by Clifford D. Simak

- Dust-jacket from the first edition
- Author: Clifford D. Simak
- Cover artist: Richard Powers
- Language: English
- Genre: Science fiction
- Publisher: Putnam Publishing
- Publication date: 1967
- Publication place: United States
- Media type: Print (Hardback)
- Pages: 216 pp
- OCLC: 2648580

The Werewolf Principle is a 1967 science fiction novel by American writer Clifford D. Simak. It was originally published by Putnam, with a paperback edition following from Berkley Books in 1968. A British hardcover was also released in 1967, with translations following into French, Italian, German, Portuguese, Dutch, and Lithuanian. Later American paperbacks were issued by DAW Books and by Carroll & Graf.

The novel deals with an amnesiac space traveler who discovers he shares his body with a wolf-like alien and a cybernetic consciousness.

== Reception ==
Judith Merril gave The Werewolf Principle a mixed review, saying that "it was an ambitious concept, obviously thought through seriously and with care; it deserved something more than to turn into a (very) well told routine novel. Fritz Leiber, however, found that Simak "does mostly an unconvincing job. Analog reviewer P. Schuyler Miller rated the novel "good, but not outstanding", praising Simak's depiction of "a totally strange, but strangely satisfying, future Earth" while uncomfortable with the story's "pretty violent action".
