= All Flesh is Grass (novel) =

1965 novel by Clifford D. Simak

- First edition
- Author: Clifford D. Simak
- Cover artist: Emanuel Schongut
- Language: English
- Genre: Science fiction
- Publisher: Doubleday
- Publication date: 1965
- Publication place: United States
- Media type: Print (Hardcover)
- Pages: 260

All Flesh is Grass is a science fiction novel by American author Clifford D. Simak, published in 1965. The book follows a small town in Wisconsin that is closed off from the outside world by a mysterious barrier, placed by extraterrestrial beings.

== Plot ==
The book is set in the town of Millville, Wisconsin, in the Midwestern United States. Simak was born in Millville, which formed the setting for many of his stories.

The book begins with the town being suddenly enclosed by a mysterious barrier. The barrier has been placed by an extraterrestrial intelligence that wants to collaborate with humans as it has with other alien races, but the town's inhabitants—as well as, eventually, the world in general—react to it fearfully. The extraterrestrials, a form of hive mind or superorganism, have the form of purple flowers.

The book follows the experiences of Brad Carter who, unlike most of his childhood friends, has remained in the slowly declining town, and who is chosen by the alien intelligence as its spokesperson. Eventually, he meets the extraterrestrial beings and agrees to speak for them on Earth though still being suspicious of their motives.

== Publication ==
All Flesh is Grass was first published by Doubleday in 1965.

== Awards and reception ==
The novel was nominated for the Nebula Award for Best Novel in 1966. A review of the book in Science Fiction and Fantasy Book Review stated that "Simak's great forte is the creation of sympathetic non-humans who patiently attempt communication with distrustful mankind." The review also stated that Simak's work accurately reflected the concerns of 1960s.

Reviewers of Stephen King's book Under the Dome have pointed out the previous use of the plot device of a mysterious barrier in All Flesh is Grass.
