= Time and Again (Simak novel) =

1951 novel by Clifford D. Simak

- Author: Clifford D. Simak
- Publisher: Simon & Schuster
- Publication date: 1951

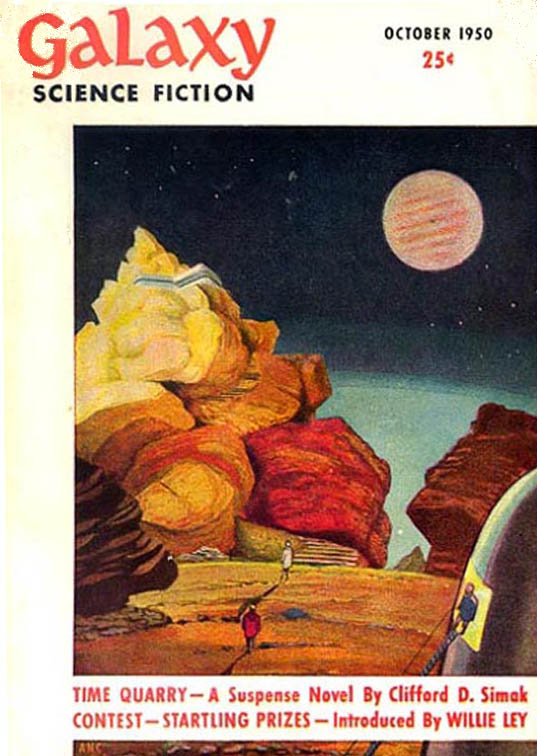
Time Quarry published in Galaxy Science Fiction Novels (October 1950).

Time and Again (sometimes written as Time & Again) is a 1951 science fiction novel by American writer Clifford D. Simak. An alternate paperback title was First He Died; it was also serialized (with a different ending) as Time Quarry.

The story is about a long-lost spaceman returning to Earth after 20 years from a planet in a distant star system, where he was affected by aliens with psychic abilities. He returns to find Earth has changed.

== Plot ==
The story is about a lost space traveler who had voyaged to a distant star system who finds his way back to Earth after two decades. The space voyager is no longer fully human after his decades in space, as he was influenced by an alien species with psychic powers. He finds Earth is a paradise, except that all is not as it seems on the comfortable surface. Some of the inhabitants are androids that can reproduce who are fighting for their rights and robots work as slaves.

His fuddled observations spark a religious schism and war. As well, "future folk insist [he] should be killed on sight as he will otherwise write a book that, because it tells a truth inconvenient to religious bigots, will cause the death of millions". Evolutionary transcendence is a theme, as it was for a number of other Simak novels. Secret assassins are sent from the future to prevent him from writing a book in the future that will have a major impact on society.

== Reception ==
The novel is one of Simak's more popular works.
