= The Big Front Yard =

1958 science fiction novella by Clifford D. Simak

- Illustrator Frank Kelly Freas
- Author: Clifford D. Simak
- Language: English
- Genre: Science fiction novella
- Published in: Astounding Science Fiction
- Publisher: Street & Smith
- Publication date: October 1958
- Publication place: United States
- Media type: Print (Magazine paperback)
- Pages: 44
- Award: Hugo Award for Best Novelette (1959)

"The Big Front Yard" is a science fiction novella by American writer Clifford D. Simak which won a 1959 Hugo Award for Best Novelette. It was also included in The Science Fiction Hall of Fame, Volume Two (1973) after being voted one of the best novellas up to 1965.

== Plot summary ==
The story is about the conversion of an ordinary house into an interplanetary portal or stargate by mysterious alien beings who apparently have taken up the task of exploring space for habitable planets and connecting them to each other, thus allowing civilizations to swap ideas easily.

In the story, a tinkerer and trader, Hiram Taine, finds out that his house contains peculiar creatures who repair and upgrade things in interesting ways and transform parts of his house to a substance impervious to harm. After unearthing a spaceship buried in the backyard, he discovers that the front part of his house is no longer on Earth but on a strange desert planet which is now accessible by merely passing through the front door. A little exploration in the desert reveals the existence of another similar house which opens to a rainy planet and some spaceships identical to the one unearthed in the backyard sitting in launch cradles next to some other empty launch cradles, implying several other similar houses. The story ends with the arrival of some aliens of either the desert planet or one of those connected to it, who are eager to trade ideas with the new member of the universal "planet-network".

== Publication history ==
Since its original publication in Astounding Science Fiction, "The Big Front Yard" has not been re-published in any other magazine, apart from the January, 1959 British version of Astounding.

The story has been anthologized at least ten times, including Italian and German translations. The story also appears in at least seven collections devoted to Simak's work, including French and German translations (for the latter, the story was titled "Das Tor zur anderen Welt" ("The Gateway to the Other World")).

More detail on the story's publication history can be found at its listing in the Internet Speculative Fiction Database (for which see the External links section below).
