= Project Pope =

1981 novel by Clifford D. Simak

- Author: Clifford D. Simak
- Cover artist: Rowena Morrill
- Language: English
- Genre: Science fiction
- Publisher: Ballantine Books
- Publication date: 1981
- Publication place: United States
- Media type: Print (hardback & paperback)
- Pages: 313
- ISBN: 0-345-29138-7

Project Pope is a science fiction novel by the American author Clifford Simak, published in 1981 by Ballantine Books. The novel is about a group of robots and humans living on a planet called the End of Nothing. Their mission is to search the universe and other dimensions to seek out true religion and knowledge. They add the information they gather to their Pope, a robotic supercomputer, in order to make an infallible authority of all knowledge and religion. The novel was nominated for both a Hugo Award for Best Novel and a Locus Award for Best SF novel in 1982.

== Plot ==
On a desolate planet named the End of Nothing at the edge of the galaxy, a group of robots and their human assistants form the religious institution called Vatican 17. This group is engaged in a secret project to create the ultimate infallible Pope, a supercomputer robot containing all knowledge that can be gathered from this universe and other dimensions.

Some of this information comes from human psychics called Listeners who can travel mentally to other planets and dimensions. Their experiences are recorded on "knowledge cubes" and eventually fed into the Pope. Based on the Pope's interpretation of all knowledge both material and spiritual the robots hope to establish a truly universal religion.

A religious crisis occurs when one of their listeners called Mary claims to have found heaven. The "theological faction" of robots petition to have Mary canonized. But another robot faction doubts the authenticity of Mary's heaven. The Vatican fears an end to the search program. Mary is taken ill and cared for by the newcomer Dr. Jason Tennyson. When he arrives on the planet he quickly befriends Jill Roberts, a reporter who wants to write a formal history of the Colony.

While exploring the new planet Tennyson meets Thomas Decker, who is usually accompanied by Whisperer. Whisperer is a member of a species who were native to the planet. He has the ability to speak to Decker and soon finds out that he can communicate telepathically more easily with Tennyson than with Decker.

Decker tells Tennyson that he thinks he knows where Mary's heaven is. Meanwhile, Decker is murdered by one of the theological faction robots in order to keep its location secret. Tennyson, Jill and Whisperer discover the location of Mary’s heaven from the equation people, aliens from another dimension. They met several unique and strange aliens, including a triad of aliens consisting of a haystack with 13 eyes, a bubble named Smokey and an octopus-like creature in constant motion nicknamed Plopper. To their surprise, they also meet Decker or rather a duplicate of him. Mary's heaven turns out to be a type of center for galactic studies that collects physical samples of life forms from all over the galaxy. Tennyson and the others struggle to get back to Vatican with proof that Mary’s heaven is this galactic library, not the real heaven.

The group is transported back to the End of Nothing, including the triad of aliens, thus providing proof that Mary's heaven is not the real heaven. The Cardinals in the Vatican accept this evidence and the Search Program is restored.

== Major characters ==
- Thomas Decker: a human traveler who crash landed on the planet and lives in solitude
- Whisperer: a Duster, a creature whose physical form is like diamond dust and who can communicate telepathically
- Jill Roberts: an investigative reporter writing a story about the little known Vatican 17 and their projects
- Ecuyer: coordinator of the Vatican's Search Program
- Mary: the listener, who is able to travel psychically to other worlds and dimensions
- Dr. James Tennyson: a medical doctor on the run and a new arrival to End of Nothing
- Enoch Cardinal Theodosius: a robot cardinal of Vatican 17 caught between the theological party of robots and those that support the Search Program

== Themes ==
Simak was haunted by what he thought would be his final statement (he died seven years later). This novel reflects his search for "the Principle", the key to understanding the universe. This novel examines the dichotomy between faith and rationality.

== Reception ==
In general, the novel was well received and is considered among Simak’s masterpieces.

In his review in Analog Science Fiction and Fact, Tom Easton recommended the novel. He highlights Simak's friendly and pastoral style saying "even when his themes are cosmic, he renders them in terms of the day to day". However, he criticized Simak for his "curious use of robots", saying "the robots might as well be laid-back flesh and blood."

== Award nominations ==
- Hugo Best Novel (nominee) 1982
- Locus award Best SF novel (nominee) 1982

== Sources ==
- Simak, Clifford D. (1982). Project Pope. New York: Ballantine Books. ISBN 9780345291387.
- Ewald, Robert J. (2006). When the Fires Burn High and The Wind Is From the North: The Pastoral Science Fiction of Clifford D. Simak. Wildside Press LLC.
- Easton, Tom (November 1982). "Review of Project Pope". Analog Science Fiction/Science Fact. pp. 161–162.
