= Way Station (novel) =

1963 science fiction novel by Clifford D. Simak

- First edition cover
- Author: Clifford D. Simak
- Cover artist: Ronald Fratell
- Language: English
- Genre: Science fiction
- Publisher: Doubleday
- Publication date: 1963
- Publication place: United States
- Media type: Print (hardback and paperback)
- Award: Hugo Award for Best Novel (1964)
- ISBN: 978-0345284204

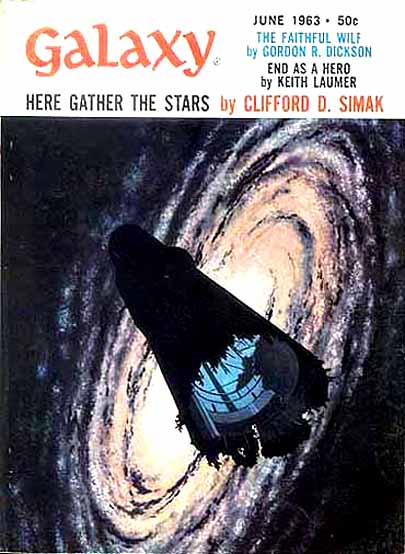
Way Station was serialized in Galaxy Science Fiction in 1963 as Here Gather the Stars

Way Station is a 1963 science fiction novel by American writer Clifford D. Simak, originally published as Here Gather the Stars in two parts in Galaxy Magazine in June and August 1963. Way Station won the 1964 Hugo Award for Best Novel.

== Plot summary ==
Born in 1840, Enoch Wallace is an American Civil War veteran who fought at the Battle of Gettysburg. He is recruited by an alien, whom Enoch names Ulysses (after Ulysses S. Grant), to operate a way station for interstellar travelers for Galactic Central. The equipment is installed in his house, while he lives in a small adjoining shed. His job is to monitor the machinery, including the regular and emergency "materializers", and make sure the biological needs of the wide variety of travelers are met. Enoch tries to communicate with them, with varying degrees of success, and befriends some of them.

He does not age while he is inside. His neighbors are aware of his longevity, but he keeps to his family farm, and they mind their own business. He has only a few friends, including old mailman Winslowe Smith and a woman in her early twenties, deaf-mute neighbor Lucy.

Almost a hundred years later, the US government becomes aware of him, and CIA agent Claude Lewis is sent to investigate. Lewis and his team secretly keep him under surveillance for two years. Enoch realizes he is being watched, but is not overly concerned.

One day, Lucy comes running to Enoch. She shows him her back; she has been whipped until she bled. When he sees her pursuers approaching, he takes her into the house on impulse, breaking his rule of letting no human inside. Hank Fisher (her white trash father) and her brother come. Lucy tried to stop her brother from training his new coon dog using a live animal, eventually paralyzing first the dog, then his master, with her mind. Her father then started whipping her, so she temporarily blinded him and ran away. When the men accuse Enoch of harboring her, he invites them to search. Hank tries to enter the house, but cannot, even with an axe. Enoch tells them to leave and never come back.

Ulysses shows up. Years before, an aged Vegan had died at the station, and in accordance with Vegan custom, Enoch had buried the body in the family plot. The authorities dug it up and took it away, upsetting the Vegans. Alien factions opposed to expansion in this direction seize upon the incident to force the tolerant Vegans to deliver an official protest to Enoch as representative of the Earth and have the station shut down. Ulysses gives Enoch the option of remaining on Earth (and aging normally) or manning another station.

Enoch tells Lewis it is vital that the body be returned. Lewis agrees. However, Ulysses does not believe it will change the decision.

Ulysses gives Enoch further bad news. Long ago, a mystic had created the Talisman, which enables people to make contact with the universal "spiritual force". It is unique, and with the death of the mystic, nobody has been able to create another. Very few possess the sensitivity or rapport to activate the device, perhaps one in many billions; the custodian took it from planet to planet for others to see and use. The Talisman was lost, misplaced or possibly stolen several years before. Despite the news being kept secret, Ulysses suspects the unusual unrest in the galaxy is somehow linked to its disappearance.

Enoch reveals that he has used the "Mizar system of statistics" to determine that war is looming on Earth. Ulysses informs him that there is a drastic, reliable method to stop it, but Enoch alone can apply for its use. It creates the mental inability to operate or understand machines for several generations before gradually wearing off. Enoch is undecided.

He starts packing his journals and alien artifacts he has been given by travelers, having decided to remain on Earth, but is interrupted when a "ratlike creature" emerges unannounced from the official materializer. The intruder takes out what looks like a gun, but Enoch grapples with it. The creature flees outside. Enoch chases after, and luckily his quarry runs into a dead end. The alien fires at him. Lucy and Ulysses arrive separately, and the latter tells Enoch that the intruder has the Talisman. Then they see Lucy struggling with the creature. Ulysses tells Enoch to shoot, and Enoch finally does, killing the alien. As Lucy comes to them with the Talisman, Ulysses joyfully tells Enoch that she is its new custodian, perhaps the best custodian in centuries. A mob, incited by Hank Fisher's lies, comes for Enoch, but Ulysses has Lucy use the Talisman to calm them down.

Afterward, Enoch "borrows" Lucy and the Talisman to attend a scheduled peace conference, before she leaves to take the Talisman around the galaxy. Ulysses states that Earth will become part of the galactic community because of her.

== Awards and nominations ==
- Way Station won the 1964 Hugo Award for Best Novel.
- Way Station placed 27th in the 1966 Astounding/Analog All-Time Poll
- Way Station placed in a tie for 25th (with Rendezvous with Rama by Arthur C. Clarke) in the 1987 Locus All-Time Poll
- Way Station placed 31st in the 1998 Locus All-Time Poll
- Way Station placed 47th (in 20th century science fiction novel category) in the 2012 Locus All-Time Poll.

== Adaptations ==
In 2004, Revelstone Entertainment optioned the film rights to Way Station. In September 2019, Netflix announced plans to produce and distribute a film based on the novel.
