= Grotto of the Dancing Deer =

- Short story by Clifford D. Simak
- Country: United States
- Language: English
- Genre(s): Science fiction

Publication
- Published in: Analog Science Fiction / Science Fact
- Publication type: Periodical
- Publisher: Condé Nast Publications, Inc.
- Media type: Print (Magazine, Hardback, & Paperback)
- Publication date: April 1980

"Grotto of the Dancing Deer" is a science fiction short story by American writer Clifford D. Simak, one of his last short works. It won the 1980 Nebula Award for Best Short Story and the 1981 Hugo Award for Best Short Story and Locus Award for Best Short Story. The story involves an archaeologist discovering a comical, ancient cave-painting and then meeting with its original painter, an immortal still living nearby.

Awards
Preceded by "The Way of Cross and Dragon" by George R. R. Martin	Hugo Award for Best Short Story; 1981	Succeeded by "The Pusher" by John Varley
