= The Goblin Reservation =

1968 novel by Clifford D. Simak

- First publication as cover story in April 1968 edition of Galaxy Science Fiction, cover art by Gray Morrow
- Author: Clifford D. Simak
- Language: English
- Publisher: Putnam
- Publication date: 1968
- LC Class: PZ3.S5884 Go

The Goblin Reservation is a 1968 science fiction novel by American writer Clifford D. Simak, featuring an educated Neanderthal, a biomechanical sabertooth tiger, aliens that move about on wheels, a man who time-travels using an unreliable device implanted in his brain, meeting a ghost, trolls, banshees, goblins, a dragon and even Shakespeare himself. The Goblin Reservation was a Hugo Award nominee in 1969 and was originally serialized in Galaxy Science Fiction magazine.

== Plot ==
The Goblin Reservation is the tale of Professor Peter Maxwell. It is set in the distant future when the Earth has been transformed into a university planet; a planet where creatures from all over the galaxy come to study, teach, and be entertained by the amazing discoveries that Earth is now rich with. Among the many things that Earth can now boast is Time University: a university devoted to slipping through time and discovering the truth about past events. People and creatures from the past are brought forward in time to be interviewed, studied and to provide entertainment for the people of the future. Among these are Alley Oop, a very smart, if at times crude, Neanderthal rescued from certain death and educated in the future. The creatures that people of the past always thought to be myth—such as trolls, fairies, goblins, and the like—have been discovered and placed on various reservations where they live and are studied by those working at Supernatural, a division of the planet-wide university.

The story begins when Peter Maxwell comes home to Earth only to discover that he has died. He is forced to investigate his own "murder" and discover who or what wanted him dead. He also returns with an additional mystery. He was apparently copied by unknown aliens and sent to a hidden crystal world that may have come from the universe that existed before ours.

The knowledge contained in the crystal planet could belong to Earth if Maxwell can discover what the intelligences remaining on the planet want. The alien race known as Wheelers want the Artifact, a monolith on display in a museum on Earth. The connection between the two provides the climax to the story. Before the events of the story, the University is expecting to close a lucrative deal for the Artifact, as well as mounting a prestigious series of talks by William Shakespeare in person. At the end, thanks to Maxwell, the deal is off, a dragon is on the loose, and Shakespeare has disappeared.

== Characters ==
- Peter Maxwell: A professor in the Supernatural Department at the University who has traveled by teleportation to a distant planet and back, originally following a report of a dragon sighting. On his return he finds that he is a duplicate of the original Maxwell, who has been murdered. He himself spent time on a planet roofed entirely in crystal that seems to contain the secrets of a previous version of the universe. He has a mission to find an important item, which turns out to be something the University collected from the past, known as the Artifact.
- Carol Hampton: A new hire at the University who was given Maxwell's old apartment. Maxwell's key still works, and the two encounter each other when he lets himself in.
- Alley Oop: A Neanderthal rescued from cannibals in the past, and Maxwell's drinking buddy. He lets Maxwell stay with him. They spend much time drinking Oop's home-brewed moonshine.
- Nancy Clayton: A society lady who hosts fashionable soirees, usually to introduce something new or bizarre. Maxwell gets what he thinks is an invitation, apparently because he has returned from the dead. However he is ushered secretly in the back door, and finds one of the Wheelers waiting to bargain with him for the crystal planet's knowledge. Nancy disavows all knowledge of the invitation, and planned the party for the Wheeler, who goes by the name "Mr. Marmaduke".
- Mr. Churchill: Churchill is a freelance business agent and fixer who has taken on the Wheelers as clients. He "bumps into" Maxwell just after his return to Earth and continues to pester him on behalf of Mr. Marmaduke.
- Harlow Sharpe: Sharpe is the head of Time University. By the time Maxwell realizes the Wheelers' intent, Sharpe has already made a deal for the Artifact. Maxwell inadvertently wrecks all of Sharpe's plans, but in compensation the knowledge of the crystal planet is promised to Earth.
- Mr. O'Toole: Leader of the Goblins and Maxwell's friend on the Goblin Reservation. Proud and arrogant, he is in conflict with the trolls who are ruining the precious October Ale. The trolls only want respect from the goblins and a share of the ale.
- Wheelers: These are a race of aliens consisting of two wheels on either side of a translucent bubble containing luminous bugs. They apparently have hive minds. It is later revealed that they used to be the draft animals of the race that made the crystal planet and the Artifact. They can expel deadly noxious gases that were probably the cause of Maxwell's original "death".
- The Banshee: A smoky wraith-like creature that is dying as an outcast on the reservation. Maxwell sits a death-watch with it, and in return the Banshee tells him the truth about the crystal planet. The banshees are messengers for the crystal planet and its creatures, and are still able to communicate with it.
- Trolls: These creatures live in bridges they construct from stones, and are the only inhabitants of the Goblin Reservation who remember the ways of magic. Despised and ostracised by the goblins, they retaliate by preventing vehicles from flying over the Reservation, notably an air car carrying Maxwell that is forced to land when its power is cut. They also vandalize fairy rings and other structures. Maxwell gets concessions from the goblins in order for the trolls to bring down the Wheelers who are pursuing the dragon through the air.
- William Shakespeare: Brought from the past, Shakespeare is scheduled to give a lecture about how he did not write the plays. His presence sparks a brawl between the English department and the Time department.
- Sylvester the Sabre-Tooth: This is Carol Hampton's pet, a bio-mechanical re-creation of one of the extinct big cats. His appearance usually leads to mayhem.
- The Artifact: Actually a dragon in suspended animation, it is accidentally freed when Maxwell uses a viewer given to him on the crystal planet. The Wheelers are trying to buy the Artifact from Earth. The first Maxwell was killed to prevent him revealing the truth about it. The Wheelers attack the dragon, and Maxwell has to negotiate peace between the goblins and the other creatures on the reservation in order to make them cooperate against the Wheelers.
- Albert Lambert the Artist: A painter born in 1973 whose style changed radically for unknown reasons when he turned 50. His later work depicts a bizarre unearthly landscape, including the Artifact. He appears suddenly, using an erratic experimental time-travel device implanted in his brain. Shown his own work, he denies painting it, but says he will eventually because he only paints things he has seen. He identifies the Wheelers, the goblins and the other mythical creatures as those he saw attempting to colonize Earth from space in the Jurassic era. The paintings depict their cities. He returns to his own time using Time University's facilities.
- The Ghost: An actual ghost who cannot remember who he used to be. At the end he is revealed to be the ghost of Shakespeare himself. The two dance together in the reservation at the story's conclusion.

== References to actual locations ==
- Lake Mendota, at the University of Wisconsin–Madison, is mentioned in a scene where Maxwell reflects on the mess his life has become.

== Awards and nominations ==
The novel was nominated to the 1969 Hugo Awards.

== Influence ==
In a 2012 video interview with Gawker Media science fiction site io9, Hugo award-winning author Kim Stanley Robinson attributed The Goblin Reservation as the book that got him initially interested in science fiction.
