= Stanford Digital Library Project =

Research program

The Stanford Digital Library Project (SDLP) (also called The Stanford Integrated Digital Library Project and The Stanford Digital Library Technologies Project) was a research program run by Hector Garcia-Molina, Terry Winograd, Dan Boneh, and Andreas Paepcke at Stanford University in the mid-1990s to 2004. The team also included librarians Rebecca Wesley and Vicky Reich. The primary goal of the SDLP project was to "provide an infrastructure that affords interoperability among heterogeneous, and autonomous digital library services." and described elsewhere as "to develop the enabling technologies for a single, integrated and "universal" library, proving uniform access to the large number of emerging networked information sources and collections."

The SDLP is notable in the history of Google as a primary source of funding for Larry Page and Sergey Brin (Brin was also supported by a NSF Graduate Research Fellowship) during the period they developed the precursors and initial versions of the Google search engine prior to the incorporation of Google as a private entity. It was also while at Stanford working under the SDLP that Larry Page filed his patent for PageRank.

The SDLP itself was funded by coalition of federal agencies including the National Science Foundation as well as donations from industry sponsors.
