= Time Is the Simplest Thing =

1961 novel by Clifford D. Simak

- First edition
- Author: Clifford D. Simak
- Cover artist: Mel Hunter
- Language: English
- Genre: Science fiction
- Publisher: Doubleday
- Publication date: 1961
- Publication place: United States
- Media type: Print
- Pages: 263
- OCLC: 795534323

Time Is the Simplest Thing is a science fiction novel by American writer Clifford D. Simak, first published in 1961. The story combines paranormal abilities with themes of space and time travel. The underlying theme is intolerance of ordinary people towards those with unusual abilities.

The novel includes long passages meditating on power, fear, and prejudice in people. The protagonist finds himself caught between people pursuing commercial power, some exploiting fear and anger for personal reasons, and others attempting to overthrow what they regard as evil institutions in the name of a greater good, but using questionable methods. There is a discussion with a Catholic priest on the nature of superstition, good, and evil. In the end the hero must create a new path for some to follow to escape persecution, while leaving the rest of humanity to deal with the world they have created. A character named after and inspired by Harriet Quimby, a real-life historical figure, appears in a supporting role.

Time Is the Simplest Thing was nominated, under its original title The Fisherman (when it was serialized in Analog Science Fiction and Fact), for the 1962 Hugo Award for Best Novel, which was won by Stranger in a Strange Land.

== Plot ==
The prologue of the novel relates how humanity gives up the dream of space travel, which is too difficult and dangerous and offers too little benefit, only to discover that there is another way to explore the universe. Some people possess the ability to travel with their minds to other worlds. Helped by new technology, they can explore another planet far across the galaxy while their bodies remain on Earth.

Shep Blaine is an explorer working for Fishhook, an organization exploiting paranormal powers to explore planets around other stars. Because of anti-paranormal prejudice in the US, Fishhook operates in northern Mexico. Explorers spend time in "star machines", which are boxes shaped and decorated to stimulate the mind to leave the body and explore the universe. They are accompanied by a small machine that can record experiences and gather physical samples. Some explorers have returned with minds affected by what they encountered. Those explorers have disappeared and never been heard from again.

Blaine returns from one expedition having encountered an intelligence that looks like a large pink blob sitting immobile in a room open to the sky. The blob greets him telepathically with the message "Hi pal! I trade with you my mind." Blaine immediately feels the alien mind alongside his own. Returning to his body, he knows he must get away before the recording of his trip is checked. However he is impeded, first by Kirby Rand, Fishhook's head of security, and then by a friend who persuades him to go to a high society cocktail party. Realizing that fleeing to the US is the obvious thing to do, he goes along with this, since Fishhook would not risk the scandal of arresting him at the party, and he might find an opportunity to do something his pursuers are not likely to expect. At the party he meets Harriet Quimby, an investigative reporter who reveals herself to be a telepath. She knows he is in trouble and tells him to discreetly leave the party and meet her outside. His pursuers are waiting for him, but he escapes them as, for some reason, time slows down enabling him to slip past. Harriet uses her knowledge of back roads, practiced for situations like this, to escape with him.

In the United States, he is separated from Harriet by local townspeople who identify him as a witch and intend to hang him. Again, something unexpected happens to the flow of time, placing him a short time in the past, which is a ghostly, decaying shadow of the world. He is able to walk out of the town before returning to normal time. He encounters Riley, an old man nursing a decrepit pickup truck on a journey north. They travel together for a while, discussing the state of the world. Fishhook is operating a commercial monopoly on the science and technology found in the galaxy, disrupting commerce and daily life while people lapse into superstition and hatred of paranormals. Some paranormals are retaliating by using their powers to terrorize people. They meet a group of young levitators who fly around at night. Riley shoots at them with a shotgun, but Blaine tries to make peace using his telepathy. He bonds with one young girl, Anita. He becomes separated from Riley, and enters a trance which results in him returning to visit the alien, who he calls the Pinkness. The Pinkness is far older than the human race, and has been traveling the universe, exchanging minds with beings of all kinds. Blaine settles in to learn from the Pinkness, but is abruptly returned to his body which has been in a coma for days. He is in hospital next to Riley, who is severely injured.

Harriet shows up with Godfrey Stone, one of the travelers who disappeared. He claimed to have seen a world free of evil, and was sent to an isolated institution where he could have lived in comfort. He escaped, as did Lambert Finn, another explorer who found a place of total evil and became obsessed with eliminating Fishhook and all paranormal people. Harriet reveals that Riley was transporting a stolen "star machine" for Stone, but intended to give it to Finn for use in his campaign. Stone is killed by an unknown assailant, and the star machine is held by the police. Again Blaine is able to manipulate time, removing the star machine to the future, which is a formless void. Having done this, he is confronted by Kirby Rand, who has been tracking Blaine and the stolen machine. Fishhook is determined to maintain its monopoly at all costs. Finn is playing into their hands by keeping the technology illegal in the US.

Blaine is about to be returned to Fishhook when he uses another part of the alien knowledge to escape. Confronting Finn, he uses his ultimate weapon: he trades minds with Finn. Finn is driven insane by the presence in his own mind of all the things he hates and fears. With Finn's mental state in his own mind, Blaine discovers that Finn had been secretly encouraging groups of paranormals to unleash a night of terror on Halloween, in order to turn the rest of the population against them. He leaves to spread a warning among the paranormals, but in the process is trapped in an icy storm and almost freezes to death.

The horrors that Finn experienced, and that drove him to try to eliminate all paranormals, contained a clue to the ability to travel to other stars physically as well as mentally. Blaine uses this to find an Earth-like planet and travel there to escape the storm. He passes this knowledge to the other paranormals in the hope that they can escape the coming witch hunts. Returning to Finn he finds that the man has committed suicide. He decides to remain on Earth until all the paranormals have made it to safety.
