= Cosmic Engineers =

1950 novel by Clifford D. Simak

- Cover of first edition (hardcover)
- Author: Clifford D. Simak
- Cover artist: Edd Cartier
- Language: English
- Genre: Science fiction
- Publisher: Gnome Press
- Publication date: 1950
- Publication place: United States
- Media type: Print (hardback & paperback)
- Pages: 224
- OCLC: 21462352

Cosmic Engineers is a science fiction novel by American author Clifford D. Simak. It was published in 1950 by Gnome Press in an edition of 6,000 copies, of which 1,000 were bound in paperback for an armed forces edition. The novel was originally serialized in the magazine Astounding in 1939.

== Plot introduction ==
The novel concerns a group of earthmen and a girl, who is awakened from suspended animation, being contacted by aliens with whom they join to prevent the collision of one universe with another.

== Reception ==
Groff Conklin found the 1950 text "has an old-fashioned and somewhat frenetic ring to it which, nevertheless, is rather pleasant." Damon Knight, however, panned the same edition as "a pot-boiler [which] should have been left interred" and noted that the 70th-century's inhabitants "talk, think, and act exactly like middle-class, middle-intellect 1930s Americans." P. Schuyler Miller reported the novel was "good fun, but nothing to weight you down with ideas."

Stephen King mentions Cosmic Engineers in Hearts in Atlantis, and also in his memoir On Writing, describing Simak's novel as "a terrific read".

== Sources ==
- Chalker, Jack L.; Mark Owings (1998). The Science-Fantasy Publishers: A Bibliographic History, 1923-1998. Westminster, MD and Baltimore: Mirage Press, Ltd. p. 299.
- Tuck, Donald H. (1978). The Encyclopedia of Science Fiction and Fantasy. Chicago: Advent. p. 391. ISBN 0-911682-22-8.
