= Ring Around the Sun (novel) =

1953 novel by Clifford D. Simak

- First edition dust jacket.
- Author: Clifford Simak
- Cover artist: Paul Bacon
- Language: English
- Genre: Science fiction
- Publisher: Simon & Schuster
- Publication date: 1953
- Publication place: United States
- Media type: Print
- Pages: 242
- OCLC: 1338865

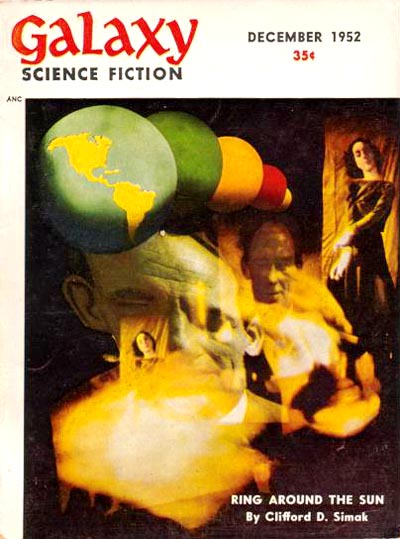
Ring Around the Sun was serialized in Galaxy Science Fiction in 1952-53.

Ring Around the Sun is a science fiction novel by American writer Clifford D. Simak. Its anti-urban and pro-agrarian sentiments are typical of much of Simak's work.

== Premise ==
The novel tells the story of a group of "mutants" with enhanced mental abilities and the ability to move between (apparently all empty) parallel worlds organizing the colonization of those worlds by the population at large. Since this requires uprooting the colonists, and thoroughly disrupting the social structure of the Earth, Earth's current power structure resists fiercely even as it is undermined by the introduction of disruptive devices and everlasting goods, such as the so-called Forever Car, at ridiculously low prices.

== Reception ==
Science fiction editors Anthony Boucher and J. Francis McComas described the novel as "solid entertainment...with plenty of startling plot-twists and some new ammunition for an old argument." New York Times reviewer Villiers Gerson praised Ring Around the Sun as "quietly written, intricately plotted...[deriving] most of its impact from its author's skillful understatement. P. Schuyler Miller, however, faulted its complicated plot, finding it more "involved" than memorable.

Writers Brian Aldiss and David Wingrove went so far as to call it "Clifford Simak's best book," ranking it alongside Simak's best-known novel, City.

== Publication history ==
Ring Around the Sun was first published as a serial in Galaxy Science Fiction in from December 1952 to February 1953. It was printed in book form later that year. It has been subsequently reprinted multiple times and translated into several different languages.

== Referenced in ==
- Stephen King's Hearts In Atlantis
