= Clifford D. Simak =

American science fiction writer (1904–1988)

- Born: Clifford Donald Simak; August 3, 1904; Millville, Wisconsin, U.S.
- Died: April 25, 1988 (aged 83); Minneapolis, Minnesota, U.S.
- Education: University of Wisconsin–Madison
- Occupations: Journalist, popular writer
- Writing career
- Period: 1931–1986 (fiction)
- Genres: Science fiction, fantasy
- Subject: Popular science
- Notable works: Way Station; City; The Visitors

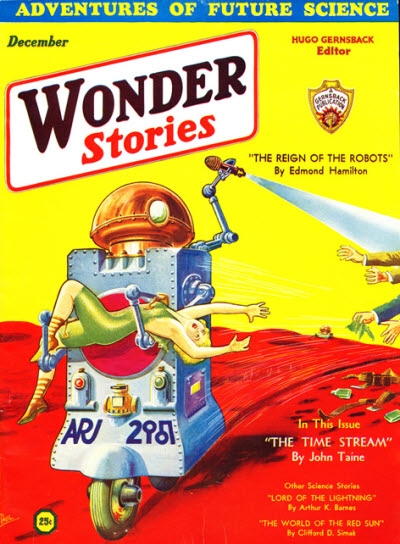
Simak's first story, "The World of the Red Sun", was listed on the cover of Wonder Stories in 1931.

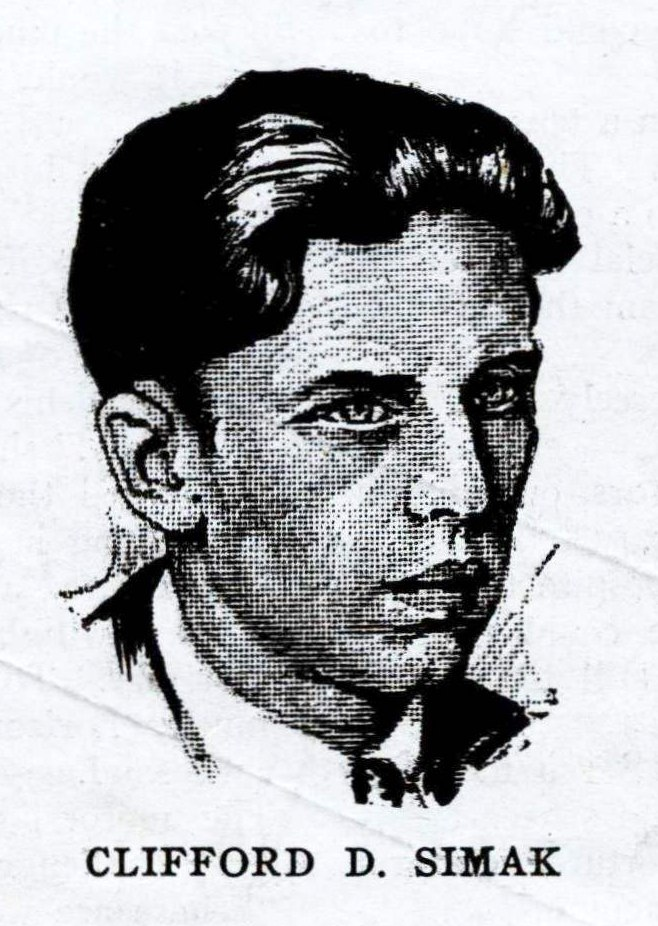
Simak as pictured in Wonder Stories in 1931.

Clifford Donald Simak (/ˈsɪmək/; August 3, 1904 – April 25, 1988) was an American science fiction writer and journalist. He won three Hugo Awards and one Nebula Award. The Science Fiction Writers of America made him its third SFWA Grand Master, and the Horror Writers Association made him one of three inaugural winners of the Bram Stoker Award for Lifetime Achievement. He is associated with the pastoral science fiction subgenre.

== Early life, education, and journalism career ==
Simak was born in Millville, Wisconsin in 1904. The son of Czech immigrant John Lewis Simak, from Mokřice, and Margaret, née Wiseman, he attended the University of Wisconsin–Madison and then taught in the public schools until 1929. He later worked at various newspapers in the Midwest. He began a lifelong association with the Minneapolis Star and Tribune (in Minneapolis, Minnesota) in 1939, which continued until his retirement in 1976. He became news editor of the Minneapolis Star in 1949 and coordinator of Minneapolis Tribune's Science Reading Series in 1961.

== Writing career ==
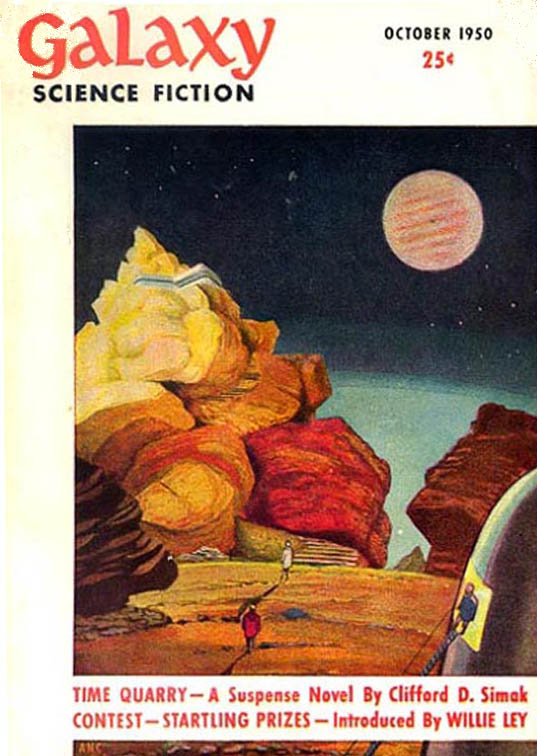
The first installment of Simak's "Time Quarry" was the cover story in the debut issue of Galaxy Science Fiction in 1950.

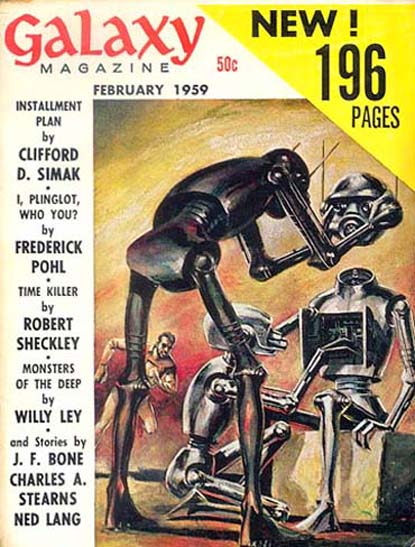
Simak's novelette "Installment Plan" was the cover story in the February 1959 issue of Galaxy Science Fiction.

Simak became interested in science fiction after reading the works of H. G. Wells as a child. His first contribution to the literature was "The World of the Red Sun", published by Hugo Gernsback in the December 1931 issue of Wonder Stories with one opening illustration by Frank R. Paul. Within a year, he placed three more stories in Gernsback's pulp magazines and one in Astounding Stories, then edited by Harry Bates. Yet his only science fiction publication between 1932 and 1938 was "The Creator" (Marvel Tales #4, March–April 1935), a story with religious implications, which was then rare in the genre.

Once John W. Campbell, at the helm of Astounding from October 1937, began redefining the field, Simak returned and was a regular contributor to Astounding Science Fiction (as it was renamed in 1938) throughout the Golden Age of Science Fiction (1938–1950). At first, as in the 1939 serial novel Cosmic Engineers, he wrote in the tradition of the earlier "super science" subgenre that E. E. "Doc" Smith perfected, but he soon developed his own style, which is usually described as gentle and pastoral. During this period, Simak also published a number of war and western stories in pulp magazines. City, a fix-up novel from this period based on short stories with a common theme of mankind's eventual exodus from Earth, won the International Fantasy Award.

Simak continued to produce award-nominated novels throughout the 1950s and 1960s. Aided by a friend, he continued writing and publishing science fiction and, later, fantasy, into his 80s. He believed that science fiction not rooted in scientific fact was responsible for the failure of the genre to be taken seriously, and stated his aim was to make the genre a part of what he called "realistic fiction."

=== Themes ===
Simak's stories often have a rural setting, which led to his style being described as "pastoral" or "pastoral science fiction". Crusty individualistic backwoodsman characters often appear - for example, Hiram Taine, the protagonist of "The Big Front Yard". Hiram's dog "Towser" (sometimes "Bowser") is common to many of Simak's works. The rural setting is not always idyllic; for instance, in Ring Around the Sun, it is largely dominated by intolerance and isolationism.

Many of his aliens have a dry, otherworldly sense of humor, and others are unintentionally amusing, in their speech, behavior or appearance. His robots are full of personality, as are his dogs. By contrast, his "heroes" are ciphers. His protagonists are often boring men, never described and never reappearing. One of Simak's editors objected to his stories because his heroes were "losers". Simak replied, "I like losers."

Many of Simak's story lines involve a quest, or a mission. Characters set out, alone, and acquire companions, often unlikely matches, along the way. On the journey, some fall by the wayside, and of these, some are reunited with the group, whilst others never heard from again.

Simak's stories often say that there is no past time for a time traveler to go to. The world moves along in a stream of time, and to move to a different place in time is to move to another world. Thus in City the Earth is overrun by ants, but the intelligent dogs and the remaining humans escape to other worlds in the time stream. In Ring Around the Sun, the persecuted paranormals escape to other Earths which, if they could all be seen at once, would be at different stages of their orbit around the Sun, hence the title. In Time Is the Simplest Thing a paranormal escapes a mob by moving back in time, only to find that the past is a place where there are no living things and inanimate objects are barely substantial.

Time travel also plays an important role in Time and Again. A long-lost space traveler returns with a message which is science fiction-slanted, yet religious in tone. Having crashed on a planet, he is then nurtured by ethereal duplicates that seem to accompany every sentient being throughout life. His befuddled observations are seized upon by religious factions, and a schism then threatens to erupt into war on Earth.

Intelligence, loyalty and friendship, the existence of God and souls, the unexpected benefits and harm of invention, and tools as extensions of humanity are often explored by Simak's robots, whom he uses as "surrogate humans". They begin as likable mechanical persons, but change in surprising ways. Having achieved intelligence, robots move on to common themes such as, "Why are we here?" and "Do robots have souls"? Examples are the faithful butler Jenkins in City, the religious robot Hezekiel in A Choice of Gods, the frontier robots in Special Deliverance and A Heritage of Stars, and the monk-like robots in Project Pope who seek heaven.

In "All the Traps of Earth", a 600-year-old robot, a family retainer who earned the name Richard Daniel, is considered chattel to be reprogrammed and lose all its memories. The robot runs away, hitches onto a spaceship, and passes through hyperspace unprotected. Daniel gains the ability to see and fix problems in anything – a ship, a robot, a human – telekinetically, but is still drifting and hunted as chattel. He stumbles on a frontier planet and finds a purpose, helping the pioneers as a doctor, a servant, a colonist, and a friend. And here Daniel achieves an epiphany: Human beings are more clever than they know. Human-created robots, set loose, can become agents with para-human abilities that benefit humanity. Thus do robots, and humankind, escape "all the traps of earth".

Simak's work also explored the idea of unknowability and encountering beings or concepts beyond human understanding. Hezekiel in A Choice of Gods cannot accept that the God he found was inhuman and abstract: "God must be, forever, a kindly old (human) gentleman with a long, white, flowing beard." In Special Deliverance, the humans are stalked by The Wailer, which turns out to be a huge wolf-like creature that bellows an infinitely sad howl. They never learn what the creature is, why it seems sad, or how it got there.

Simak's short stories and longer novellas range from the contemplative and thoughtfully idyllic to pure terror, although the punch line is often characteristically understated, as in "Good Night, Mr. James" and "Skirmish'". There is also a group of humorous stories, including "The Big Front Yard". Way Station is a psychological study of a lonely man who has to make peace with his past and finally manages to do so, but not without personal loss.

Other traditional science fiction themes in Simak's work include the importance of knowledge and compassion, such as in "Immigrant" and "Kindergarten". Identity play, as in "Good Night, Mr. James" (filmed as The Outer Limits: The Duplicate Man in 1964). Fictions come to life in "Shadow Show" and elsewhere, such as the novel Out of Their Minds. There is a revolt of the machines in "Skirmish", and a meeting with an alien world in "Beachhead", also known as "You'll Never Go Home Again" (many of these are in his collection Strangers in the Universe).

Simak sometimes wrote stories close to his profession as a writer. For example, in the novelette "So Bright the Vision" (1968), he portrayed artificial intelligence writing software similar to ChatGPT, but focusing on socio-psychological issues.

Simak sums up his life's work in the foreword to his collection Skirmish. After explaining what themes he avoids – no large-scale alien invasions, no space wars, no empire sagas – he states:

Overall, I have written in a quiet manner; there is little violence in my work. My focus has been on people, not on events. More often than not I have struck a hopeful note ... I have, on occasions, tried to speak out for decency and compassion, for understanding, not only in the human, but in the cosmic sense. I have tried at times to place humans in perspective against the vastness of universal time and space. I have been concerned where we, as a race, may be going, and what may be our purpose in the universal scheme – if we have a purpose. In general, I believe we do, and perhaps an important one.

== Works ==
From 1950 to 1986 Clifford Simak wrote more than 30 novels and four non-fiction works, with Way Station winning the 1964 Hugo Award. More than 100 of his short stories were published from 1931 to 1981 in the science fiction, western, and war genres, with "The Big Front Yard" winning the 1959 Hugo Award for Best Novelette and "Grotto of the Dancing Deer" winning the Hugo and Nebula Awards for Best Short Story in 1981. One more short story, "I Had No Head and My Eyes Were Floating Way Up in the Air", had been written in 1973 for publication in Harlan Ellison's never-published anthology The Last Dangerous Visions and was first published posthumously in 2015.

One of his short stories, "Good Night, Mr. James", was adapted as "The Duplicate Man" on The Outer Limits in 1964. Simak notes this is a "vicious story—so vicious that it is the only one of my stories adapted to television."

== Awards and honors ==
The Science Fiction Writers of America made Simak its third SFWA Grand Master in 1977, after Robert Heinlein and Jack Williamson. In 1987 the Horror Writers Association named him one of three inaugural winners of the Bram Stoker Award for Lifetime Achievement, with Fritz Leiber and Frank Belknap Long. Asteroid 228883 Cliffsimak, discovered by French amateur astronomer Bernard Christophe in 2003, was named in his memory. The official naming citation was published by the Minor Planet Center on March 30, 2010 (M.P.C. 69496).

Other lifetime awards

- Minnesota Academy of Science Award for distinguished service to science 1967
- First Fandom Hall of Fame award 1973

Best-of-year literary awards

- Retro Hugo for best novelette, “Rule 18” (Astounding Science-Fiction, July 1938)
- Retro Hugo for best novelette, "City" (Astounding Science-Fiction, May 1944)
- International Fantasy Award for best fiction book (1953) for City
- Hugo Award for best novelette (1959) for "The Big Front Yard"
- Hugo Award for best novel (1964) for Way Station
- Jupiter Award for best novel (1978) for A Heritage of Stars
- Hugo Award for best short story (1981) for "Grotto of the Dancing Deer"
- Nebula Award for best short story (1981) for "Grotto of the Dancing Deer"
- Locus Award for best short story (1981) for "Grotto of the Dancing Deer"
- Analytical Laboratory award for best short story (1981) for "Grotto of the Dancing Deer"

== Personal life ==
Simak married Agnes Kuchenberg on April 13, 1929, and they had two children, Richard "Dick" Scott (1947–2012) and Shelley Ellen. In his novel Time and Again he wrote, "I have been happily married to the same woman for thirty three years and have two children. My favorite recreation is fishing (the lazy way, lying in a boat and letting them come to me). Hobbies: Chess, stamp collecting, growing roses." He dedicated the book to his wife Kay, "without whom I'd never have written a line". He was well liked by many of his science fiction-writing friends, especially Isaac Asimov.

He died in Minneapolis on April 25, 1988.

== Sources ==
- Contemporary Authors. New Revision Series. Detroit, Gale Research Co.
- Sam Moskowitz Seekers of Tomorrow (1967) (one chapter covers Simak)
- "Obituaries: Clifford D. Simak." The Herald (Melbourne), April 29, 1988.
- Weatherby, W. J. "Obituary of Clifford Simak, realist of SF". Guardian Newspapers Limited/The Guardian (London), April 29, 1988.
