= 1950 in science fiction =

The year 1950 was marked, in science fiction, by the following events.

== Births and deaths ==
=== Births ===
- William Barton
- James Blaylock
- David Brin
- Paul Cook
- Ian Douglas (pseudonym of William H. Keith, Jr.)
- William R. Forstchen
- Karen Joy Fowler
- Martin Grzimek
- K. W. Jeter
- John Kessel
- Stephen R. Lawhead
- Kirk Mitchell
- Kevin O'Donnell, Jr. (d. 2012)
- Mary Doria Russell
- Lewis Shiner
- Karlheinz Steinmüller
- Michael Swanwick
- Michael Szameit (d. 2014)
- Steve Rasnic Tem

=== Deaths ===
- Edgar Rice Burroughs (b. 1875)
- Erle Cox (b. 1873)
- George Orwell (b. 1903)
- Olaf Stapledon (b. 1886)

== Events ==
- Galaxy Science Fiction begins publishing.
- Doubleday begins publishing science fiction.

== Literary releases ==
=== Serialized novels ===
- The Five Gold Bands by Jack Vance, Startling Stories (November), an adventure where a man seeks the secret to interstellar travel hidden in five gold bracelets.
- The Hand of Zei by L. Sprague de Camp, Astounding Science Fiction (October – January 1951), two explorers face piracy and royal intrigue while searching for a missing person and dealing with forbidden love.
- The Wizard of Linn by A. E. van Vogt, Astounding Science Fiction (April - June), a mutant lord uses alien technology to combat ancient invaders and reshape humanity's fate.

=== First editions ===
- The Cometeers by Jack Williamson, a fix-up novel combining two stories from the Legion of Space series. (Note: The Cometeers (1936) and One Against the Legion (1939), both published in Astounding Stories.)
- Cosmic Engineers by Clifford D. Simak, a tale of advanced technology and cosmic exploration. (Note: Originally serialized in Astounding Stories in 1939.)
- The Dreaming Jewels by Theodore Sturgeon, in this debut novel, a runaway boy finds refuge in a circus and gets involved in a battle over alien power.
- First Lensman by E. E. "Doc" Smith, an epic space opera in the Lensman series, won the Retro Hugo Award for Best Novel in 2001.
- The House That Stood Still by A. E. van Vogt, examines the impact of alien technology on humanity.
- The Martian Chronicles by Ray Bradbury, chronicles human colonization of Mars and its unforeseen consequences. (Note: Considered a novel, but composed of short stories.)
- Needle by Hal Clement, a symbiotic alien detective partners with a human boy to track down a criminal on Earth.
- Nomad by George O. Smith, a man uses knowledge gained from Martians to conquer the Solar System. (Note: Originally serialized in three parts in Astounding beginning in December 1944, under Smith's pseudonym, Wesley Long.)
- Pebble in the Sky by Isaac Asimov, this debut novel explores identity and rebellion in a future Earth scenario.
- The Rat Race by Jay Franklin, a naval officer becomes entangled in espionage and experiences bizarre transformations.
- Shadow on the Hearth by Judith Merril, depicts the aftermath of nuclear war on a suburban family.
- The Voyage of the Space Beagle by A. E. van Vogt, follows the Space Beagle and describes its encounters with alien civilizations. (Note: A fix-up compilation of four stories previously published between July 1939 and May 1950.)

=== Novellas ===
- The Man Who Sold the Moon by Robert A. Heinlein, a visionary businessman uses unconventional methods to achieve lunar exploration, part of the Future History series.

=== Novelettes ===
- "The Little Black Bag" by Cyril M. Kornbluth, Astounding Science Fiction (July).

=== Short stories ===
- "Born of Man and Woman" by Richard Matheson, The Magazine of Fantasy & Science Fiction (July)
- "Scanners Live in Vain" by Cordwainer Smith, Fantasy Book (January)
- "The Shadow Men" by A. E. van Vogt, Startling Stories, expanded into the novel The Universe Maker in 1953.
- "There Will Come Soft Rains" by Ray Bradbury, Collier's Weekly (May 6)
- "To Serve Man" by Damon Knight, Galaxy Science Fiction (November)

=== Short story collections ===
- The Dying Earth by Jack Vance
- I, Robot by Isaac Asimov
- The Martian Chronicles by Ray Bradbury (fix-up collection)

=== Juveniles ===
- Farmer in the Sky by Robert A. Heinlein, a Heinlein juvenile describing the challenges faced by a young farmer on a distant planet.

== Movies ==
| Title | Director | Cast | Country | Subgenre/Notes |
|---|---|---|---|---|
| Destination Moon | Irving Pichel | Warner Anderson, John Archer, Tom Powers | United States | Adventure Drama Thriller (Note: Winner of a Retroactive Hugo Award in 2001.) |
| Flying Disc Man from Mars | Fred C. Brannon | Kent Fowler, Gregory Gaye | United States | Action Adventure Crime Fantasy Serial film |
| The Flying Saucer | Mikel Conrad | Mikel Conrad, Pat Garrison, Hanz von Teuffen | United States | Thriller |
| The Invisible Monster | Fred C. Brannon | Stanley Price, Richard Webb, Aline Towne, Lane Bradford | United States | Action Adventure Crime Thriller Serial film |
| Rocketship X-M | Kurt Neumann | Lloyd Bridges, Osa Massen, John Emery | United States | Family |

== Awards ==
The main science-fiction awards known at the present time did not exist at this time.

== See also ==
- 1950 in science
