= Monsters (collection) =

Book by A.E. van Vogt

- First edition
- Author: A. E. van Vogt
- Language: English
- Genre: Science fiction
- Publisher: Paperback Library
- Publication date: 1965
- Publication place: United States
- Media type: Print (paperback)
- Pages: 185 pp

Monsters is a collection of eight science fiction short stories by Canadian-American writer A. E. van Vogt; written during 1940 and 1950, they were assembled by Forrest J. Ackerman in 1965.

== Contents ==
- Introduction by Forrest J. Ackerman.
- "Not Only Dead Men" (1942)
- "Final Command" (1949)
- "War of the Nerves" (1950)
- "Enchanted Village" (1950)
- "Concealment" (1943)
- "The Sea Thing" (1940)
- "The Monster" (1948)
- "Vault of the Beast" (1940)

== Sources ==
- A.E van Vogt, Monsters, Publisher: Corgi, 1977, ASIN B000Z4H1V2.
