= Out of the Unknown (collection) =

Book by A.E. van Vogt

- Dust-jacket of the first edition
- Author: A. E. van Vogt and E. Mayne Hull
- Illustrator: Roy Hunt, Charles McNutt and Neil Austin
- Cover artist: Roy Hunt
- Language: English
- Genre: Fantasy
- Publisher: Fantasy Publishing Company, Inc.
- Publication date: April 1948
- Publication place: United States
- Media type: Print (hardcover)
- Pages: 141
- OCLC: 2925369

Out of the Unknown is a collection of fantasy short stories by Canadian writers A. E. van Vogt and E. Mayne Hull, a married couple. It was first published in 1948 by Fantasy Publishing Company, Inc. in an edition of 1,000 copies. The stories originally appeared in the magazine Unknown.

== Contents ==
- "The Sea Thing" by A. E. van Vogt
- "The Wishes We Make" by E. Mayne Hull
- "The Witch" by A. E. van Vogt
- "The Patient" by E. Mayne Hull
- "The Ultimate Wish" by E. Mayne Hull
- "The Ghost" by A. E. van Vogt

== Sources ==
- Chalker, Jack L.; Mark Owings (1998). The Science-Fantasy Publishers: A Bibliographic History, 1923-1998. Westminster, MD and Baltimore: Mirage Press, Ltd. p. 269.
- Contento, William G. (26 January 2008). "Out of the Unknown A. E. van Vogt & E. Mayne Hull (Fantasy Publishing Co., Inc., 1948, $2.50, 141pp, hc)". Index to Science Fiction Anthologies and Collections. Archived from the original on 8 March 2016.
- Tuck, Donald H. (1978). The Encyclopedia of Science Fiction and Fantasy. Chicago: Advent. p. 431. ISBN 0-911682-22-8.
