= Mind Cage =

Mind Cage may refer to:

- The Mind Cage, a 1957 science fiction novel by Canadian-American writer A. E. Van Vogt
- Mind Cage (film), a 2016 Cambodian horror film starring Sarita Reth

== See also ==
- Mindcage (disambiguation)
