= The Monster (short story) =

- Short story by A. E. van Vogt
- Country: United States
- Language: English
- Genre: Science fiction

Publication
- Published in: Astounding SF
- Publication type: Periodical
- Media type: Magazine, paperback
- Publication date: August 1948

"The Monster" is a science fiction short story by Canadian-American writer A. E. van Vogt, originally published in the August 1948 issue of Astounding Science Fiction.

The story is often described as highly characteristic of the late Golden Age of Science Fiction; van Vogt considered it one of his personal favorites, and it was retroactively selected as one of the best stories of 1948 by Isaac Asimov in 1983. It has been one of van Vogt's most frequently anthologized short stories - sometimes under the alternate title "Resurrection" - and was included in several of his early collections, including 1952's Destination: Universe! and 1965's Monsters.

== Plot ==
Illustration by Edd Cartier accompanying the story's first publication in Astounding

In the distant future, a survey ship of the Ganae - an advanced, expansionist, non-anthropoid species - discovers an uninhabited Earth by using a device called a "locator", necessary because only a minuscule fraction of stars possess planets. The Ganae land and find the aftermath of a mysterious catastrophe; all animal life is extinct, and largely-intact cities are littered with the remains of humans who seem to have died where they stood.

The Ganae also possess a "reconstructor," a device capable of restoring to life an intelligent being with all of its memories from minimal biological remains. Curious as to the reason for the depopulation of the planet - which they intend to colonize - the survey crew locates a museum and begin resurrecting humans in order to interrogate them. Initially, their efforts meet with limited success: the first subject is an Egyptian pharaoh who interprets the Ganae as gods or demons, while the second is a Prohibition-era American who thinks he is having a drunken hallucination. The third human is from approximately 4000 AD: he immediately recognizes the Ganae as aliens, but knows nothing about the catastrophe. While the two previous resurrectees had been summarily executed after questioning, the third is able to take telepathic control of an advanced atomic device among the museum exhibits and uses it to defend himself, killing several Ganae soldiers in the process. The survey team is forced to retreat back to their mothership, from which they destroy the museum and surrounding city with a nuclear weapon.

The rattled aliens remain concerned that the still-unknown cause of humanity's extinction could someday also threaten their future settlement. The Ganae captain reluctantly decides to revive one last human for questioning, this time choosing someone who appears to have died in the extinction-event itself. After awakening, the fourth human immediately demonstrates total "mental control of nucleonic, nuclear, and gravitonic energies", including teleportation, disappearing as soon as he is revived. He soon reappears and effortlessly shrugs off all attempts to harm him.

The panicking Ganae - who have long feared encountering a species superior in power to themselves, and being held to account for the many genocides they have committed - immediately destroy their locator and reconstructor. Slightly reassured, they attempt to negotiate with the human, who freely discloses that Earth was depopulated by a "nucleonic storm" dozens of light-years across, extending beyond the range of humanity's teleportation abilities. The Ganae discovery of the locator was - by the highly jingoistic aliens' own admission - pure happenstance; without it, humanity had been forced to rely on trial and error, and the single habitable planet they had found was also in the path of the storm. When the Ganae assert that they must have Earth due to the population pressure caused by their Malthusian reproductive instincts, the human calmly tells them "if you don’t control them, we will control them for you." The infuriated aliens - for whom expansion is a biological imperative - leave, promising to return with a fleet large enough to overwhelm the human's powers and reduce the surface of the Earth to slag.

En route to their nearest world, the Ganae are shocked when the human is observed aboard their ship. They realize that range of his teleportation is much greater than he has led them to believe, and deduce that he intends to accompany them back to their base, obtain reconstructor technology, and teleport back to Earth to revive more of his kind; even an entire Ganae fleet would be helpless against multiple humans wielding the same powers. Unwilling to even transmit a warning for fear that the human might trace their transmission beam and teleport himself to its destination, the Ganae instead decide to sacrifice themselves, steering their near-indestructible ship into a blue-white star and destroying the controls. Dying horribly, one of the Ganae crew comes to the sudden realization that the human's brief display of teleportation upon his awakening had given him enough time to visit the ship and learn the secrets of both the reconstructor and the locator; his entire subsequent interaction with the Ganae has been calculated to manipulate them into committing mass suicide without warning their homeworld, ensuring that "no alien mind" shall know of the impending rebirth of the human race.
