= Supermind (novel) =

1977 novel by A.E. van Vogt

- First edition (Cover artist Vincent Di Fate)
- Author: A. E. van Vogt
- Cover artist: Vincent Di Fate
- Language: English
- Genre: Science fiction
- Publisher: DAW Books
- Publication date: January 1977
- Publication place: United States
- Media type: Print (Paperback)
- Pages: 176
- ISBN: 0-87997-275-0
- OCLC: 2886411

Supermind is a 1977 science fiction novel by A. E. van Vogt, published by DAW. Like most of van Vogt's longer works, it is a fix-up, comprising three shorter pieces written over a period of more than twenty-five years:

- "Asylum" (Astounding Science Fiction, May 1942)
- "The Proxy Intelligence" (Worlds of If, October 1968)
- "Research Alpha" (by A. E. van Vogt, James H. Schmitz, and E. Mayne Hull, Worlds of If, July 1965)

Despite sharing authorship of the third story (which had previously been collected in 1971's More Than Superhuman), Schmitz was not credited for the novel in which it was incorporated. After a significant interval, van Vogt also informally acknowledged a contribution by Hull, his wife and occasional collaborator.

== Setting ==
All three constituent stories are psychological thrillers revolving around one of van Vogt's most frequent themes, superhuman cognition.

"Asylum" takes place about a hundred years after the discovery of practical space travel. Earth is at peace, colonies dot the Solar System, and the transit time to the Jovian moons is about a month.

Human civilization is being monitored by agents of a vast galactic civilization - also composed of humans - which had colonized Earth seven thousand years ago. The "galactics" are superficially indistinguishable from Earthly humans, but possess superhuman cognition. Raw intelligence is apparently a sharp social differentiator in Galactic society; the Galactic Observer stationed in the Solar System and his daughter are of the "Klugg" caste, with an average IQ of 200-250, which is by Galactic standards considered menial. The Observer is noted to be psychologically tortured by an awareness of his own relative inferiority, and he and his daughter both treat the term "Klugg" as a slur. (The word - meaning "clever" in German - was presumably chosen ironically by van Vogt, a native speaker of Plautdietsch.) Higher Galactic castes include the Lennel, Medder, and Hulak; at the top of the scale are the Great Galactics, immensely powerful beings with IQs in excess of 1200.

In "Asylum," higher cognition grants advanced but non-paranormal capabilities such as extremely rapid reflexes, lie detection, multicameralism, and the ability to control lesser minds through non-verbal hypnotic suggestion; the follow-up stories contain explicitly psionic powers such as telepathy and teleportation. The middle story, "Research Alpha," is relatively detached from the other two, having no characters in common with them and being slightly inconsistent with regard to the setting; whereas crime is noted to have been extirpated on Earth in "Asylum," thousands of murders still occur annually on the Earth of "Research Alpha." The cognition scale used in the story is that of the Galactics, differing markedly from the conventional IQ scale used in the other two.

== Plot ==
The book's three distinct sections correspond to its three constitutive stories. In the first, based on 1942's "Asylum," two members of the Dreegh tribe arrive in the Solar System. The Dreegh are essentially vampires–the last remnants of a group of galactics whose physiology had been changed after they were accidentally irradiated by an abnormal sun a million years earlier, making them immortal but requiring regular infusion of blood and "bio-electric energy" to survive. Finding Earth undefended, they plan to summon the entire Dreegh tribe to escape with ten thousand years' worth of blood and energy before the Galactics can respond. The Dreegh are however concerned that the local Galactic Observer may interfere with their plan; they rapidly deduce that professor Ungarn, a famous scientist living on a private asteroid near Europa, is the Observer. Using sophisticated mental powers granted by IQs of roughly 400, they brainwash a reporter named William Leigh and send him to infiltrate the heavily-defended asteroid. At the culmination of his mission, however, Leigh "awakens" to hjis true identity as one of the Great Galactics. A member of the galaxy's highest cognitive tier, he had gone undercover on Earth for three years to entrap the Dreegh, whom he now uses his powers to easily subdue. However, the "Leigh" cover personality reacts with terror to the realization that it is not real, and is about to be involuntarily reintegrated into a vastly greater intelligence.

The second section, corresponding to 1968's "The Proxy Intelligence," begins only moments after the conclusion of the first. The viewpoint switches to Steve Hanardy, the pilot of a small freighter contracted to supply the Ungarn asteroid from Europa. Unprepossessing and intellectually below-average, Hanardy is suddenly troubled by unnatural insight into the events taking place at the asteroid, including knowledge of the true nature of the Ungarns, the Dreeghs, and Leigh. He is also inexplicably aware that Leigh has neutralized and captured the Dreegh fleet, but that he has now left the immediate area, and that the last nine surviving Dreegh are en route, the first of them impersonating a Galactic emissary. The Dreegh Sween arrives and takes Hanardy and the Ungards hostage, but chooses not to kil them because he is intrigued by Hanardy, whom he believes the Great Galactic is using as a channel for negotiation. Sween reveals that the Great Galactics are not a caste like Kluggs, but an emergent temporary state that can manifest in any individual of any caste, and that he is trying to prevent it from fully manifesting in Hanardy. The remaining eight Dreegh arrive and take the Ungarns and Hanardy to Europa, where they hope to kill them all simultaneously without triggering the emergence. However, a shock brought on by the imminent death of Patricia Ungarn (whom Hanardy secretly loves) "awakens" him; he stops time, saves her, cures the Dreegh, and teleports their spaceship six thousand light years away.

The third section, corresponding to the 1965 novella "Research Alpha," takes place on Earth at the titular research institute, where the amoral Dr. Henry Gloge is about to start secretly experimenting on unknowing human subjects. Gloge has created "Point Omega Stimulation," a serum that accelerates evolutionary development, causing test subjects to rapidly experience up to a million years of simulated natural selection. He surreptitiously administers this serum to two low-level employees: a secretary, Barbara Ellington, and her boyfriend, lab assistant Vince Strather. Ellington experiences a rapid, joyous expansion of her intellect, immediately realizing what Gloge had done to herself and Strather; she also realizes that John Hammond, the director of Research Alpha, is not human. Hammond, who is - along with several other Research Alpha senior staff - a secret observer from the galactic civilization, becomes concerned with the experiment and tries to detain Ellington, but she is determined to receive the full course of Point Omega treatments and uses her powers to evade him. Once she has awakened to the full power of a Great Galactic, she returns to Research Alpha and informs Hammond that she intends to use the serum to uplift the entire human race. Hammond explains that she must not, as the results of her transformation were unique; other humans would be affected differently, and might either perish or change into lesser beings. He demonstrates by letting her see Strather, whose final evolutionary form turns out that of a tiny, pathetic homunculus. Ellington undoes his transformation, erases everyone's memories of the surrounding events, fakes her own death, and departs for deep space, having heard the telepathic call of another Great Galactic.

== Novel version ==
The 1977 fixup made only minor changes to the plot, such as moving forward the origin of the Dreegh tribe from a million years ago to only a thousand; the only significant addition to the narrative was a short passage interpolated into the penultimate chapter of "Research Alpha," in which Ellington informs Hammond that the Great Galactic she is going to meet in space is in fact "Asylum's" protagonist William Leigh. Their intent is to merge into the titular Supermind, which (a single-paragraph coda promises) will possess unparalleled powers of perception and an IQ of 10,000.
