= The Book of van Vogt =

1972 collection of short stories and articles by A. E. van Vogt

- Cover of 1st edition
- Author: A. E. van Vogt
- Illustrator: Jack Gaughan
- Cover artist: Karel Thole
- Language: English
- Series: Book of ... series
- Genre: Science fiction
- Publisher: DAW Books
- Publication date: 1972
- Publication place: United States
- Media type: Print (paperback)
- Pages: 191
- ISBN: 0-87997-004-9
- OCLC: 1184695
- Followed by: The Book of Brian Aldiss

The Book of van Vogt is a collection of science fiction short stories by Canadian-American author A. E. van Vogt. It was first published in paperback by DAW Books in April 1972 as the first volume in its Book of ... series, and was reprinted by the same publisher in September 1979 under the title Lost: Fifty Suns. The first British edition was published in paperback under the latter title by New English Library in December 1980. The book has been translated into Romanian.

== Summary ==
The book consists of seven works of short fiction by the author, four of them original to the collection, together with an introductory note by editor Donald A. Wolheim and a frontispiece by artist Jack Gaughan.

== Contents ==
- "A Statement to Science Fiction Readers" (Donald A. Wollheim)
- "The Timed Clock" (original to the collection)
- "The Confession" (original to the collection)
- "The Rat and the Snake" (from Witchcraft & Sorcery, January/February 1971)
- "The Barbarian" (from Astounding Science Fiction, December 1947)
- "Ersatz Eternal" (original to the collection)
- "The Sound of Wild Laughter" (original to the collection)
- "Lost: Fifty Suns" (from The Mixed Men, 1952)

== Reception ==
The collection was reviewed Theodore Sturgeon in Galaxy Science Fiction Magazine, Sept./Oct. 1972, Annemarie Kindt (in Dutch) in Holland-SF 1973, #2, and Roland Goldsmith in Paperback Inferno v. 4, no. 3, 1980.
