= Vault of the Beast =

- Short story by A. E. van Vogt
- Frontispiece for the story's first publication, by Edd Cartier
- Country: written in Canada, initially published in the United States
- Language: English
- Genre: Science fiction

Publication
- Published in: Astounding
- Publication type: Periodical
- Media type: Print (Newspaper, Magazine, Hardback & Paperback)
- Publication date: August 1940

Chronology
—	Black Destroyer

"Vault of the Beast" is a short story by Canadian writer A. E. van Vogt, published in the August 1940 issue of Astounding Science Fiction.

== Plot ==
A shape-shifting construct created by malevolent extra-dimensional beings arrives on Earth as a stowaway on a freighter from Mars, having disguised itself as various inanimate objects during transit. The construct is capable of imitating any form of matter, passing through solid objects, controlling gravity, and reading human minds, but is also in constant physical pain; it has been sent to retrieve the "greatest mathematical mind in the Solar System." After landing, the construct kills and impersonates a clerk in the office of businessman and "Harvard graduate in mathematics" Jim Brender, whom it approaches with an offer: it will reveal the location of the lost Martian city of Li in exchange for Brender's assistance in gaining access to the "Tower of the Beast" said to be at its center.

The Martians - extinct for between 25 and 100 million years - had built cities and artifacts of what humans call "ultimate metal," indestructible by any known force; they had also possessed an understanding of the mysterious "ieis" force, a constant differential energy flow between dimensions. Humans are aware of an ancient Martian tradition that at some point in the distant past, an enormous extra-dimensional "beast" fell onto Mars. The Martians read its mind and were appalled by its intentions, but could not physically destroy it, so they imprisoned it in a massive vault of ultimate metal secured with an ieis time-lock set to only release at the unimaginably distant End of Time. This vault - a mile tall and two-sevenths of one across - is the "Tower of the Beast", and remains undiscovered. The construct claims to have located the Vault and communicated telepathically with the "beast," and found it be merely an unjustly-imprisoned explorer. It offers Brender the lost city's vast treasure of ultimate metal if he will assist him in opening the time lock, which can only be prematurely released by "factoring the ultimate prime number."

Brender is skeptical, and attempts to verify the construct's human cover identity; discovering it to be fake, he dismisses him as a fraud. Undaunted, the construct leaves and proceeds to serially murder and impersonate a dozen wealthy investors, manipulating the stock market to cause a crash specifically aimed at bankrupting Brender, who is left penniless, left by his wife, and forced by to take a job as a space pilot. The construct intends to accompany him to Mars, but when it is exposed as a shape-shifter just after takeoff, its extra-dimensional creators take remote control of it. The construct's Controller strikes a conciliatory tone, apologizes for the murders, and explains that his comrades are merely trying to rescue their colleague Kalorn, a scientist who had discovered how to bridge their two "number spaces." It had taken them millions of years to make the attempt, because time in their native universe flows much more slowly: one of their years equals billions of ours. The Controller notes that it cannot itself open the lock, as the mathematics of its universe are incompatible with ours. It again tempts Brender with the wealth of the lost city, this time adding that it has read his wife's mind and learned she still loves him, and would return to him if he regained his station. Brender cautiously agrees, and the Controller modifies the spaceship to reduce its travel time to Mars to less than a minute.

Brender and the construct arrive in Li and alight on the nearly-buried roof of the Vault, beside the lock: a flow of flickering ieis bridging two terminals of ultimate metal. Brender rapidly solves the problem, explaining to the Controller that only a finite quantity must be physically subtracted from the flow of ieis to make the infinite largest prime factorable. The Controller immediately painfully reconfigures the construct into a device to do so; while it screams in agony, the Controller sneeringly informs Brender that it has lied to him, and that his true purpose in freeing Kalorn is to obtain his secret of interdimensional travel, with which his people intend to subjugate all dimensions. The horror jogs Brender's mind into the sudden realization that his solution was flawed, and he uses his rocket belt to flee from the rooftop. The lock releases, and the Vault's lid is flung violently into space, but all that emerges from it is an eddy of dust. Brender returns to find the construct slowly disintegrating in the sand. It tells him that it read his mind at the last moment, and shared his realization: the lock had been set for the End of Time, but when the ieis flow had been broken, the End of Time had merely been locally brought forward to the present, with an immense epoch instantly elapsing within the Vault at the moment it was forced open. The construct had been caught in the periphery of the effect, which had merely aged it enormously, but Kalorn - despite only experiencing time at his home dimension's rate, billions of times slower - had been physically annihilated.

The construct tells Brender that it deliberately withheld his last-minute realization from its masters - whom it resents because they would not let it stay human, its only respite from pain - then dies. Brender pityingly calls it "poor Frankenstein," then uses the Controller-enhanced ship to almost-instantly return to Earth, where his wife - still unaware that the treasures of Li have once again made him fabulously wealthy - meets him tearfully at the spaceport and tells him she has never stopped loving him.

== Publication history ==
After starting his writing career by writing for true-confession style pulp magazines, such as True Story, van Vogt decided to switch to writing something he enjoyed: science fiction. He was inspired by the August 1938 issue of Astounding Science Fiction, specifically the story Who Goes There? by John W. Campbell, Jr.: "I read half of it standing there at the news-stand before I bought the issue and finished it. That brought me back into the fold with a vengeance. I still regard that as the best story Campbell ever wrote, and the best horror tale in science fiction."

Vault of the Beast, van Vogt's first professional effort, initially received a positive rejection letter from Astounding; however, after his subsequent story Black Destroyer was not only accepted but promoted to cover story, Vault of the Beast was accepted as well, and published in 1940. It has since been collected in several anthologies, such as Monsters, The Other Side of the Moon and Isaac Asimov Presents The Great SF Stories 2 (1940).
