= The Other Side of the Moon (anthology) =

1949 book by August Derleth

- Dust-jacket from the first edition
- Editor: August Derleth
- Language: English
- Genre: Science fiction
- Publisher: Pellegrini & Cudahy
- Publication date: 1949
- Publication place: United States
- Media type: Print (hardback)
- Pages: 416

The Other Side of the Moon is an anthology of science fiction stories edited by American writer August Derleth. It was first published by Pellegrini & Cudahy in 1949. Many of the stories had originally appeared in the magazines The Graphic Christmas, Astounding Stories, Thrilling Wonder Stories, Wonder Stories, Weird Tales, Blue Book, Planet Stories, The Saturday Evening Post, Collier's Weekly or in the collections The Fourth Book of Jorkens by Lord Dunsany and The Witchfinder by S. Fowler Wright.

Aside from a second printing by Pellegrini and Cudahy in 1949, the anthology has never been reprinted in its original form. All subsequent editions were substantially abridged. The only British hardcover, from Grayson & Grayson in 1956, contained only 11 stories. The only American paperback, a 1959 Berkley Books version, included only 10 of the original 20 stories. The first British paperback, from Panther Books in 1963, also included only 10 stories, though the selection was somewhat different. A 1966 British paperback, from Mayflower-Dell in 1966, carried the same title, but contained the 10 stories not included in the Panther edition.

In 1951, The New York Times reported that The Other Side of the Moon had become the first science fiction title to be included in the Talking Books program.

== Contents ==
- Introduction, by August Derleth
- "The Appearance of Man", by John D. Beresford
- "The Star", by H. G. Wells
- "The Thing on Outer Shoal", by P. Schuyler Miller
- "The Strange Drug of Dr. Caber", by Lord Dunsany
- "The World of Wulkins", by Frank Belknap Long
- "The City of the Singing Flame", by Clark Ashton Smith
- "Beyond the Wall of Sleep", by H. P. Lovecraft
- "The Devil of East Lupton", by Murray Leinster
- "Conquerors’ Isle", by Nelson Bond
- "Something from Above", by Donald Wandrei
- "Pillar of Fire", by Ray Bradbury
- "The Monster", by Gerald Kersh
- "Symbiosis", by Will F. Jenkins
- "The Cure", by Lewis Padgett
- "Vault of the Beast", by A. E. van Vogt
- "The Earth Men", by Ray Bradbury
- "Original Sin", by S. Fowler Wright
- "Spiro", by Eric Frank Russell
- "Memorial", by Theodore Sturgeon
- "Resurrection", by A. E. van Vogt

== Reception ==
Kirkus Reviews praised the original volume as "A collection of recent supersonic science fiction, not only from magazines devoted solely to this type of reading but even from nationally known periodicals". New Worlds reviewer Leslie Flood found the British hardcover to be "Neither distinguished nor mediocre, but a reasonable addition to your bookshelf for future browsing". Authentic Science Fiction described the same edition as "a mixed bag of good, very good, and indifferent", but found it "most enjoyable". P. Schuyler Miller, reviewing the Berkley paperback, noted that Derleth was "conservative and literary in his SF tastes, Lovecrafty in his fantasy".

== Sources ==
- Tuck, Donald H. (1974). The Encyclopedia of Science Fiction and Fantasy. Chicago: Advent. p. 139. ISBN 0-911682-20-1.
