= The Man with a Thousand Names =

Book by A.E. van Vogt

First edition. Cover art by Vincent Di Fate.

The Man with a Thousand Names is a short science fiction novel by Canadian-American writer A. E. van Vogt. It was published in August 1974 by DAW Books, and in December 1975 by Sidgwick and Jackson.

== Plot summary ==
The main character is Steven Masters, a spoiled 23-year-old who happens to be the only son of the world's richest man. At a party he (while drunk) states that he wishes to go on a proposed space flight to a distant life bearing planet called Mittend. Mittend is 30 light years from Earth and is the closest life bearing planet. When he is told that he does not qualify, he gets indignant and sets upon a campaign to join in the expedition. Using his father's money he is able to get passage. Six weeks later he arrives on the planet. It turns out to be very similar to Earth, with a breathable atmosphere.

Upon landing he wanders off from the main group and meets the natives. The natives turn out to be naked and primitive but have a powerful group mind named "Mother". The natives, upon seeing Steven, chase after him and when they catch him and touch him, his mind gets traded into the body of a 38-year-old bar waiter back on earth. The bar waiter's mind gets transferred to Steven's body on the other planet.

It turns out that the bar waiter used to work for Steven as a butler. Steven blamed him for a crime he did not commit and got him fired. Immediately after the transfer, he goes into psychological shock and the bar is forced to call an ambulance. They sedate him and he has to spend a few days in the hospital. His story (of being mind swapped) gets out and combined with the fact the expedition has gone missing, he becomes a sensation. While in the hospital, Masters Senior (his father) comes to visit him. He leaves stating that the person there is not Steven. Upon leaving the hospital, he gets picked up by the bartender who drives him to work. He works the day.
