= The Crucible of Time =

1983 novel by John Brunner

- First edition
- Author: John Brunner
- Cover artist: Don Dixon
- Language: English
- Series: Time
- Genre: Science fiction
- Publisher: Del Rey/Ballantine
- Publication date: Sep 1983
- Media type: Print (Hardcover)
- Pages: 288 pp
- ISBN: 0-345-31224-4
- Dewey Decimal: 823' .914
- LC Class: PR6052.R8C78
- Followed by: The Tides of Time

The Crucible of Time is a fix-up science fiction novel by John Brunner. It was first published in 1983.

== Serials ==
Parts 1 and 2 appeared in Isaac Asimov's Science Fiction Magazine as "The Fire is Lit" (Sep 1982) and "Fusing and Refusing" (Jan 1983).

== Plot ==
The novel deals with the efforts of an alien species to escape their homeworld and integrate into a new society. In the novel, the plot begins with the system passing through a cloud of interstellar debris, resulting in a high rate of in-falling matter. The species' unique biology and biological technology complicate matters. The book starts with the tale's beginning and then shifts toward the structure of the imagery surrounding the suns, moons, and comets. Then the plot continues on an individual's life and the cultivation culture.

== Awards ==
- Locus Award 1984, Best SF Novel (13th place)
