= Black Destroyer =

1939 A. E. van Vogt short story

- Short story by A. E. van Vogt
- Cover story painting by Graves Gladney
- Country: Canada
- Language: English
- Genre: Science fiction

Publication
- Published in: Astounding SF
- Publisher: Street & Smith
- Publication date: July 1939

"Black Destroyer" is a science fiction short story by Canadian-American writer A. E. van Vogt, first published in Astounding SF in July 1939. It has been marked as the story that represents the start of the Golden Age of Science Fiction.

"Black Destroyer" was combined with several other short stories to form the novel The Voyage of the Space Beagle. The novel was claimed as an inspiration for the movie Alien and van Vogt collected an out-of-court settlement of $50,000 from 20th Century Fox.

== Plot summary ==
A Coeurl, a large, immortal, intelligent and tentacled black cat-like animal, considers its near-future starvation as its food source of id-creatures has been hunted to extinction. Just as all seems lost, a spaceship lands near an abandoned Coeurl city and id-creatures pour out ("id" turns out to be its phosphorus-based nutrient (Note: This "id" is changed to "potassium suspended in living tissue (cells)" in The Voyage of the Space Beagle though actually this is how the simulated id concocted by the chemist Kent is described: "living cells with potassium in suspension" (van Vogt 2008, p. 18). However, the simulated id that Kent concocted "was held in suspension in a manner that was almost useless" to the coerl(van Vogt 2008, p. 19). Elsewhere it is stated: "he must eat living creatures.. substance.. obtained only from tissues that still palpitated with the flow of life" (van Vogt 2008, p. 9).)). He quickly surmises they are a scientific expedition from another star, which excites him as he considers scientists to be unlikely to harm him. He approaches them as if simply curious. The human expedition is first concerned about the Coeurl's approach, but he shows himself to be intelligent and attempting to communicate via radio waves. Assuming an intelligent species would be as curious about them as they are about him, they show him their ship. The Coeurl begins to plan to kill all of the men onboard and then fly to wherever they came from so he will have "unlimited id".

Tortured by his long starvation, the Coeurl kills a man that went off exploring and eats his id. Examining the body, the humans discover it has been drained of all its phosphorus (which the coeurl accomplishes through controlling vibration), and conclude the Coeurl is the killer. To test their theory, they bring the Coeurl a bowl of phosphorus, which he attacks with relish and almost kills the person who delivered it. They lock him up, but the Coeurl's ability to control "vibrations of every description" allows him to easily open the electric lock. He waits until they are sleeping and then kills several crew members before returning to the cage. This does not fool the men, and they begin planning ways to kill him.

Using his powers to control energy, the Coeurl causes the rear wall of the cage to dissolve and takes control of the engine room. He uses the ship's power to reinforce the walls of the room so the men cannot blast their way in, and then propels the ship into outer space. The coeurl builds a 40 foot cigar-shaped spacecraft in the engine room's machine shop, and before the humans break into the engine room, he enters the small craft and breaks out of the mother ship, making an escape. (Note: In the novel, suggestion by the Nexialist Grosvenor prompts the crew to deliberately let the Coeurl have access to a lifeboat in disrepair, and the creature repairs it.) and takes flight. However, the Coeurl was unfamiliar with the mechanism of the anti-accelerator drive, and his boat had actually been distancing itself rather than approaching his star, and meanwhile the humans catch up. The coeurl commits suicide rather than be inevitably killed by the disintegrator weapon of the humans.

Considering the situation, the men decide they must return to the planet and kill the other Coeurl (Which seems a wise decision, given that the coeurl was planning to collaborate with others of his kind to exploit his learned knowledge of spaceships to travel to other planets (Note: But the novel apparently deletes this peering in to the mind, so the reader is not informed the coeurl was planning an exodus with its own kind.)). Archeologist Korita suggests that rather than form a posse, they can settle down and lure the enemy. Biologist Smith is disgusted by the plan (the biologist contingent was earlier against destroying the valuable specimen). Director Morton declares the consensus was that they correctly judged the creature to be a criminal, even from the era of his original civilization. The archeologist quips "It was history, honorable Mr. Smith, our knowledge of history that defeated him", in conclusion. (Note: In the novel version, Nexialist Grosvenor becomes the hero of the novel, even though his ideas are generally despised by the crew. In the end, however, most of the crew are leaning to accept Nexialism. The Nexialist had suggested letting the coeurl escape back to its home, and now that it was destroyed, suggests a more passive approach: "So why not just let them die of starvation?" getting the last word in the novel.)

== Publication ==
In 1939, Van Vogt's first SF story "Vault of the Beast" submitted to Astounding was returned for a rewrite and was not published until the following year, but his second effort, "Black Destroyer" was accepted straightaway and graced the cover of the July 1939 issue, becoming an instant sensation.

The story was re-used in 1950 as the basis for the early portions (chapters 1–6) of The Voyage of the Space Beagle, Van Vogt's first and most famous fix-up novel, (Note: The "fix-up" was actually composed of four novellas, the other constituent works being "Discord in Scarlet" published December 1939 (chapters 13–21), "War of Nerves" (chapters 9 to mid-12) and "M33 in Andromeda" spread throughout.) (in fact the first sci-fi fix-up novel ever created), the pieces tied together by the theme of "nexialism" (multidisciplinary approach to solutions, a method for grooming polymaths). The work incorporates ideas inspired by Oswald Spengler's historical principles. Several minor changes were made to the Coeurl; the tentacles that act as receptors and fingers now end in suction cups, and the dietary chemical was changed from phosphorus to potassium (drained through the terminal suckers on its tentacles). In the original story the coeurls are assumed to be direct descendants of the race who built the planet's civilization, but in the novel we learn they were created by "the builders", which were the ones that once dominated the planet.

The Voyage of the Space Beagle describe both the coeurl consuming id (and thus humans) as well as another alien called the Ixtl boarding a spaceship so they can lay eggs within the crew, which taken together so closely matched the plot of Alien that van Vogt sued the production company for plagiarism. The suit was eventually settled out of court for $50,000.

The story, in its original form, has appeared in anthologies on occasion.

== Reception ==
The same July 1939 issue of Astounding also contained Isaac Asimov's first story to appear in the magazine, "Trends", while the next issue included the first story by Robert A. Heinlein, "Life-Line", and the next, Theodore Sturgeon's, "Ether Breather". As a result, this issue is described as the start of the Golden Age of Science Fiction.

Asimov cited "Black Destroyer" itself and not the issue as the starting point, stating that the presence of his story was "pure coincidence". According to David Drake, "Almost everybody agrees that the Golden Age started with the July, 1939, issue of Astounding, however. That's because its cover story was 'Black Destroyer,' the first published SF by A. E. Van Vogt." Eric Flint also praises it, but notes that Terry Carr was somewhat dismissive of its place in history simply because both were thirteen years old when they read it, and "thirteen ... was the age that defined everybody's 'Golden Age'.

The basic plot was the standard formula already being criticized by the readership of the day, but Vogt was seen as offering a fresh approach.

== Adaptations ==
The MARVEL series Worlds Unknown adapted Black Destroyer into comic book format.

== Coeurl in other works ==
The Dirty Pair series of novels by Japanese writer Haruka Takachiho features a pet coeurl named Mugi as sidekick, modified to be tame to humans. (Note: See cover art of Dirty Pair showing the coeurl.)

=== In videogames ===
The coeurl is one of the stock monsters in the Final Fantasy series, beginning with the second game. A reptilian looking coeurl appears as a boss in Etrian Odyssey Untold: The Millennium Girl. In the MMORPG title Caravan Stories a snow leopard-like coeurl with large horns appears, designed by Miho Midorikawa aka G.River.

== Sources ==
(Primary source)

- van Vogt, A. E. (July 1939a). "Black Destroyer". Astounding. Vol. 23, no. 4. Illustrated by Frank Kramer. pp. 9–31. (pdf file @ archive.org)
  - —— (2002). The SFWA Grand Masters. Macmillan. pp. 275–. ISBN 9780312868765.
- van Vogt, A E (December 1939b). "Discord in Scarlet". Astounding. Vol. 24, no. 4.
- van Vogt, A. E. (1950). The Voyage of the Space Beagle. New York: Simon & Schuster.
  - —— (2008) [1950]. The Voyage of the Space Beagle. Macmillan. ISBN 9780765320773.

(Secondary sources)

- Decker, Mark (2016). Industrial Society and the Science Fiction Blockbuster: Social Critique in Films of Lucas, Scott and Cameron. Jefferson, North Carolina: McFarland. ISBN 9781476623870.
- Ketterer, David (1992). Canadian Science Fiction and Fantasy. Indiana University Press. ISBN 9780253331229.
- Sussex, Lucy (July 1983). "Long Versus Short SF: The Examination of a Fix-Up" (PDF). Foundation: The Review of Science Fiction. 28: 28–33.
- Westfahl, Gary (2019). The Rise and Fall of American Science Fiction, from the 1920s to the 1960s. Jefferson, North Carolina: McFarland. ISBN 978-1-4766-3851-5.
