= The Voyage of the Space Beagle =

Serial novel by A.E. van Vogt

- Cover of the first edition
- Author: A. E. van Vogt
- Language: English
- Genre: Science fiction
- Publisher: Simon & Schuster
- Publication date: September 8, 1950
- Publication place: United States
- Media type: Print (Hardcover & Paperback)
- Pages: 240
- OCLC: 1240657
- LC Class: 50-14253

The Voyage of the Space Beagle (1950) is a science fiction novel by American writer A. E. van Vogt. An example of the space opera subgenre, the novel is a "fix-up" compilation of four previously published stories:

- "Black Destroyer" (cover story of the July 1939 issue of Astounding magazine—the first published SF by A. E. van Vogt) (chapters 1 to 6)
- "War of Nerves" (May 1950, Other Worlds magazine) (chapters 9 to 12)
- "Discord in Scarlet" (cover story of the December 1939 issue of Astounding magazine—the second published SF by A. E. van Vogt) (chapters 13 to 21)
- "M33 in Andromeda" (August 1943, Astounding magazine, later published as a story in the book M33 in Andromeda (1971)) (chapters 22 to 28)

In the novel, a huge globular spaceship, populated by a chemically castrated all-male crew of almost a thousand, who are on an extended scientific mission to explore intergalactic space, encounters several, mostly hostile, aliens and alien civilizations. On board the spaceship during its journey, both political and scientific revolutions take place.

The title of the book is a reference to The Voyage of the Beagle, Charles Darwin's book about his five-year voyage around the world on HMS Beagle. The book was republished in 1952 under the title Mission: Interplanetary.

== Plot summary ==
The main protagonist of the novel is Dr. Elliott Grosvenor, the only Nexialist on board (a new discipline depicted as taking an actively generalist approach towards science). It is Grosvenor's training and application of Nexialism rather than the more narrow-minded approaches of the individual scientific and military minds of his other shipmates that consistently prove more effective against the hostile encounters both from outside and within the Space Beagle. He is eventually forced to take control of the ship using a combination of hypnotism, psychology, brainwashing, and persuasion, in order to develop an effective strategy for defeating the alien entity Anabis and saving the ship and our galaxy.

The book can be roughly divided into four sections corresponding to the four short stories on which it was based:

In the first section, the Space Beagle lands on a largely deserted desolate planet. Small scattered herds of deer-like creatures are seen, and the ancient ruins of cities litter the landscape. Coeurl, a starving, intelligent and vicious cat-like carnivore with tentacles on its shoulders, approaches the ship, pretending to be an unintelligent animal, and quickly infiltrates it. The creature kills several crewmen before being tricked into leaving the now spaceborne ship in a lifeboat. It then commits suicide when it realizes it has been defeated.

In the second part, the ship is almost destroyed by internal warfare caused by telepathic contact with a race of bird-like aliens, called Riim. The benign signals that the Riim send are incompatible with the human mind. Only Grosvenor's knowledge of telepathic phenomena saves the ship from destruction.

In the third section, the ship comes across Ixtl, a scarlet being floating in deep space. It is a vicious survivor of a race that ruled a previous universe before the Big Bang, the creation of our own universe. Ixtl boards the ship, and being obsessed with its own reproduction, kidnaps several crew members in order to implant parasitic eggs in their stomachs. It is eventually tricked into leaving the ship, after all the crew have left the ship temporarily, leaving no prey left for its offspring to feed on.

In the last section, Anabis, a galaxy-spanning consciousness, is encountered. Once again, it is both malevolent, starving and aggressive, and under all circumstances must be prevented from following the ship back to any other galaxy. Anabis, which is essentially a galaxy-size will-o'-the-wisp, feeds off the death of living organisms, and has destroyed all intelligent life in its galaxy. It transforms all planets it can find into jungle planets through terraforming, since it is this kind of world that produces most life. The crew of the Space Beagle lures the intelligence to chase the ship into deep space, causing it to starve to death.

Running concurrently to this, the book also covers a power struggle on the ship among the leaders of individual scientific and military groups.

== Reception ==
P. Schuyler Miller, while praising the original stories, found that the rewriting needed to stitch them into an original novel was inadequate, so that "the whole is less than its original parts."

The novel was reprinted in 2008. The critic Joe Milicia took the opportunity of this re-issue to revisit the novel in a comprehensive review for the New York Review of Science Fiction. Milicia looks at what today’s reader might find in the novel, noting:

Thus the stories read as if they were the inspiration for those episodes of Star Trek where some particularly odd and hostile entity must be ingeniously defeated by the Enterprise crew before that entity continues on its marauding path. (Indeed, they very likely were direct inspirations.)

Among the surprises identified by Milicia that it may hold for the modern reader are the disharmony aboard the Space Beagle ("Clearly, Machiavelli rather than Darwin is the true spirit guiding the Space Beagle"), and that the Space Beagle’s mission is like the original Beagle's and very unlike the USS Enterprise's.

== Adaptations ==
Alien is virtually a film version or translation of "Black Destroyer". Van Vogt is not credited, and as it turns out he sued the film-makers for plagiarism; the latter settling out of court.

The third section of the book, "Discord in Scarlet" was given a comics adaptation (under the title "Voyage of the Space Beagle") in the February 1983 issue of Eerie. Rich Margopoulos and Luis Bermejo are the credited writer and artist, with Bermejo's Ixtl rendition bearing a more-than-passing similarity to Giger's design.

== References in other works ==
A sentient panther-like species named Coeurl (or Zorl in French editions), with psi capabilities and tentacles coming out of its shoulders, was adapted as the character Mughi (or Mugi) in the anime Dirty Pair. It also appears in several versions of the Final Fantasy video games, and as the Displacer beast in the Dungeons & Dragons role-playing game. The Coeurl suck phosphorus ("id") from their victims; the "salt vampire" in the Star Trek episode "The Man Trap" removes sodium.

At first glance, the alien Ixtl also appears to be an inspiration for the film Alien, though those involved with the film denied any influence on its part. A lawsuit Van Vogt initiated against 20th Century Fox for plagiarism was settled out of court, the details of which were never disclosed.

Two of the races, the Riim (pp 82–83) and the Ixtl (pp 52–53) are depicted in Barlowe's Guide to Extraterrestrials.

In David Gerrold's Chtorr novel A Season for Slaughter, a robot probe called a "prowler" is used. The prowler makes a distinctive "coeurl" sound, described several times as "the prowler coeurled on". The reference to the Coeurl in the first story of the Voyage of the Space Beagle, where the phrase "Coeurl prowled on" occurs, is unmistakable.

A hologram called a "prowler" appears as one of the distractions employed by the Enterprise lieutenant Kevin Riley to surprise the deck crew of the "Voyager" worldship in David Gerrold's Star Trek novel The Galactic Whirlpool. It is a friendly, weirdly-colored, balloon-like hologram that makes a distinctive "coeurl" sound ("Riley stepped up to the illusion and said, 'Command: Prowl! Activate.' 'Coeurl,' said the prowler, nodding to nuzzle Riley wetly, then it turned and lumbered down the corridor. 'Coeurl? Coeurl?' it called as it disappeared into the gloom. On and on the prowler called, until finally it disappeared into the murk of distance. Kirk looked at Riley. 'Good job, Lieutenant. Uh- where is it going now?'").
