= The Book of Brian Aldiss =

1972 collection of short stories and articles by Brian Aldiss

- Cover of 1st edition
- Author: Brian Aldiss
- Cover artist: Karel Thole
- Language: English
- Series: Book of ... series
- Genre: Science fiction
- Publisher: DAW Books
- Publication date: 1972
- Publication place: United States
- Media type: Print (paperback)
- Pages: ix, 191
- ISBN: 0-87997-029-4
- OCLC: 871387
- Preceded by: The Book of van Vogt
- Followed by: The Book of Frank Herbert

The Book of Brian Aldiss is a collection of science fiction short stories by British author Brian Aldiss. It was first published in paperback by DAW Books in November 1972 as the second volume in its Book of ... series. The first British edition was published in paperback under the title The Comic Inferno by New English Library in October 1973. The book has been translated into German.

== Summary ==
The book consists of nine works of short fiction, together with an introduction by the author.

== Contents ==
- "Introduction"
- "Comic Inferno" (from Galaxy Magazine v. 21, no. 3, February 1963)
- "The Underprivileged" (from New Worlds Science Fiction v. 44, no. 130, May 1963)
- "Cardiac Arrest" (from Fantastic v. 20, no. 2, December 1970)
- "In the Arena" (from If v. 13, no. 3, July 1963)
- "All the World's Tears" (from Nebula Science Fiction no. 21, May 1957)
- "Amen and Out" (from New Worlds v.49, no. 165, August 1966)
- "The Soft Predicament" (from The Magazine of Fantasy and Science Fiction v. 37, no. 4, October 1969)
- "As for Our Fatal Continuity ..." (from New Worlds Quarterly 3, January 1972)
- "Send Her Victorious" (from Amazing Stories v. 42, no. 1, April 1968)

== Reception ==
Theodore Sturgeon in Galaxy Science Fiction Magazine writes that Aldiss "warns us ... consistently that we are, as a species, horror-bound. He warns us because he loves us, really thinks we have something worth saving. This emerges from [his] comedies (he can be very funny) and his tragedies and in his short tense suspense pieces. His new retrospective from DAW, The Book of Brian Aldiss, ... bears out this notion."

The collection was also reviewed by Dave Hartwell in Locus #130, December 29, 1972 and Eddy C. Bertin in Moebius Trip Library: Science Fiction Echo 17, 1973.
