= The Pawns of Null-A =

1956 novel by A.E. van Vogt

- Cover of the first standalone edition (under alternative title)
- Author: A. E. van Vogt
- Cover artist: Ed Valigursky
- Language: English
- Genre: Science fiction
- Publisher: Ace Books (standalone)
- Publication place: United States
- Media type: Print
- Preceded by: The World of Null-A
- Followed by: Null-A Three

The Pawns of Null-A is a 1956 science fiction novel by American-Canadian writer A. E. van Vogt, originally published as a four-part serial in Astounding Stories from October 1948 to January 1949 as The Players of Null-A. It incorporates concepts from the General semantics of Alfred Korzybski and refers to non-Aristotelian logic. All later US editions have used the original name. The first UK edition was published in 1960 as The Pawns of Null-A, later UK editions have appeared under both titles.

The novel is a continuation of the story of Gilbert Gosseyn from The World of Null-A, expanding on the galactic events which drove the interplanetary invasion of the earlier story.
