= Children of Tomorrow =

1970 novel by A.E. van Vogt

- First edition
- Author: A. E. van Vogt
- Cover artist: John Schoenherr
- Language: English
- Genre: Science fiction
- Publisher: Ace Books
- Publication date: 1970
- Publication place: United States
- Media type: Print (Paperback)
- Pages: 254 pp
- ISBN: 0-450-04598-6

Children of Tomorrow is a 1970 science fiction novel by Canadian-American author A. E. van Vogt.

== Plot summary ==
Commander John Lane returns from a ten-year mission in space to find that the teenagers of Spaceport City have organized themselves into "outfits", well disciplined, non-violent little gangs with their own customs and argot, and that the parent's role in teen upbringing has become minimal. His 16-year-old daughter Susan belongs to the Red Cat Outfit, whose newest member Bud is actually a spy for the alien fleet that has secretly followed John Lane as he returned to Earth.
