= Null-A Three =

Book by A.E. van Vogt

- Cover of the first edition
- Author: A. E. van Vogt
- Cover artist: Bruce Pennington
- Language: English
- Genre: Science fiction
- Publisher: Sphere Books
- Publication place: United States
- Media type: Print
- Pages: 215
- ISBN: 0-7221-8841-2
- Preceded by: The Pawns of Null-A
- Followed by: Null-A Continuum

Null-A Three, usually written Ā Three, is a 1985 science fiction novel by Canadian-American writer A. E. van Vogt. It incorporates concepts from the General semantics of Alfred Korzybski and refers to non-Aristotelian logic.

The novel is a continuation of the adventures of Gilbert Gosseyn from The World of Null-A (1945) and The Pawns of Null-A (1948).

== Plot ==
Gilbert Gosseyn wakes to find he is Gosseyn Three, in telepathic contact with Gosseyn Two. One of the spare bodies used in his reincarnation machinery was found and forced to life by the approach of an immense space fleet from another galaxy, crewed by the primordial ancestors of humans, gripped in an eon-long war with mutants equally old. The space-fleet is ruled by an unstable youngster who seems to possess many of the same powers as Gosseyn, including a double-brain.

Gosseyn must school the youth in Null-A sanity, save the Earth from a cabal of gangsters and businessmen who oppose the return of the Games Machine, discover the secret reasons behind the endless horrifying war, and stop the intrigues of Enro the Red to return to power.

== Reception ==
Dave Langford reviewed Null-A Three for White Dwarf #64, and stated that "The book can only be read as parody or in a spirit (several bottles' worth) of overwhelming nostalgia for the 'Golden Age'."

== Reviews ==
- Review? [French] by Jean-Pierre Andrevon (1984) in Fiction, #352
- Review by Pascal J. Thomas (1985) in Locus, #288 January 1985
- Review by Joseph Nicholas (1985) in Paperback Inferno, #53
- Review by Dan Chow (1985) in Locus, #294 July 1985
- Review by Mary S. Weinkauf (1985) in Fantasy Review, September 1985
- Review by Elton T. Elliott (1985) in Science Fiction Review, Winter 1985
- Review by Gene DeWeese (1985) in Science Fiction Review, Winter 1985
- Review by George Hay (1985) in Foundation, #35 Winter 1985/1986, (1986)
- Review by Tom Easton (1986) in Analog Science Fiction/Science Fact, February 1986
- Review by Don D'Ammassa (1986) in Science Fiction Chronicle, #79 April 1986
- Review? [French] by Feyd Rautha (2020) in Bifrost, #98
