= More Than Superhuman =

Book by A.E. van Vogt

Cover of the first edition, published by Dell.

More Than Superhuman is a collection of science fiction short stories by Canadian-American writer A. E. van Vogt, published in 1971.

== Contents ==
- "Humans, Go Home"
- "The Reflected Men"
- "All the Loving Androids"
- "Laugh, Clone, Laugh" (with Forrest J Ackerman)
- "Research Alpha" (with James H. Schmitz)
- "Him"
