= The Universe Maker =

1953 novel by A.E. van Vogt

- First edition
- Author: A. E. van Vogt
- Cover artist: Paul Orban
- Language: English
- Genre: Science fiction
- Publisher: Ace Books
- Publication date: 1953
- Publication place: United States
- Media type: Print
- Pages: 138

The Universe Maker is a science fiction novel by American author A. E. van Vogt, published in 1953 by Ace Books as an Ace Double with The World of Null-A. It is based on the author's "The Shadow Men" (Startling Stories, 1950).

Set 400 years into the future, the main character is Morton Cargill, a U.S. w cArmy officer who served in the Korean War.

== Synopsis ==
Morton Cargill, Korean War soldier, accidentally kills a girl named Marie while driving drunk. He runs from the scene. A year later, he gets a letter from the girl asking to meet him. But this is not Marie, but a remote descendant from the future, who is suffering an inherited form of neurosis which time travelers, called 'The Shadows', have traced back to his negligent crime. The only therapy to cure her is if she witnesses him being murdered. He then wakes 400 years into the future, in the Shadow City, where he is to be executed.

He escapes, with help from Ann Reece, who represents a group called 'Tweeners', who are organized by a Shadow named Grannis. Grannis is apparently a traitor to the Shadows and wishes the Tweeners to attack and destroy the Shadow City. Cargill is overcome by suspicions against the Tweeners, so during his rescue he escapes into the woods where he is immediately captured. His captors this time are futuristic nomads or 'trailer trash' called 'Planiacs' who live in floating airships.

The Planiacs have rejected civilization and its intolerable psychological pressures. Their airships are stocked and repaired by the Shadows, and they live utterly purposeless lives floating from place to place, occasionally stopping to fish.

Grannis the Shadow shows up among the Planiacs, apparently to seize Cargill. Cargill escapes by seducing his jailer's daughter, Lela Bouvey, and stealing an airship. He spends several months as a nomad, and begins to organize a political revolution among them, but is recaptured by the Shadows, and sent back in time to the same night he escaped.

Ann Reece, the Tweener agent, again frees him, brings him to their city, where he is hypnotically programmed. He has no choice but to carry out his mission, to enter the Shadow City and shut off its defensive energy field, so that an air raid might destroy the Shadows.

The Tweeners are those Planiacs who attempted to join the Shadows, but could not pass their tests. They plan to destroy the Shadows and force the Planiacs out of their nomadic existence and back to earthbound labor.

Cargill has several dreams where is encounters beings from previous or future eons, which convinces him that the fate of the universe hangs in the success or failure of the Shadow-Tweener war.

As a delaying tactic, he advises the Tweeners how to reorganize their air force to make a successful raid, he again seduces his jailer (which this time is Ann Reece), and he again begins to organize a political revolt among his captors, hoping an uprising of peacelovers among the Tweeners will stop the coming attack.

Now firmly convinced that the Shadows are innocent, and that the planned Tweener attack is wrong, Cargill is unable to halt or even hinder the hypnotic programming that forces him to enter the Shadow City.

The Shadows are superhumans able to travel through time, walk through walls, and revive the dead. Once in the city, Cargill is given the Shadow training, which consists of a single lecture hypnotically imprinted on his brain. Now armed with all their powers and abilities, Cargill emerges from the training session to witness a celebration of the election results: the Shadows elect their leaders retroactively through time, voting only after the leader's term of office is up, and reporting it back through time to themselves on election day. To his surprise and dread, Cargill finds he is the new leader.

The leader of the Shadows is Grannis; Cargill himself is Grannis. He spends the last chapter of the book traveling back through time to organize the various pointless conspiracies among the Tweeners and Planiacs which brought him here. While being killed and raised from the dead, he recalls that he and all other participants in the life-force of the cosmos created the universe as a game, and became bound to it, and to its tragedies, due to their psychological limitations: greed creates time, the desire for revenge creates death, and so on. Cargill-Grannis discovers he is innocent of the original death of Marie, but now he must arrange that death in order to prevent a time paradox which would otherwise destroy the universe.

== Concepts ==
The book contains ideas such as: Lamarckian Racial Memory alternate time lines that have a phantom existence in other time lines, as well as complex chemical process that are intelligent but not actually living. The Inter-Time Society for Psychological Adjustments is a group of people who can find out if one is suffering from Lamarckian racial memory and use time travel to correct it. Cargill is brought to the future by them so the descendant of the person he killed can watch him die and feel better.

== The world ==
There are three main groups mentioned in the book: the Floaters, a bunch of non-productive people who travel in airships and are supported by the shadow men; the Tweeners, who are out to control the world, who have a civilization; and the Shadow Men, a group of mysterious figures who exploit time travel to further their ends.

== Reception ==
Boucher and McComas received Universe Maker quite poorly, saying it "sounds like the work of an imitative neophyte who had read too much van Vogt and absorbed the weaknesses without the strength." Groff Conklin said that van Vogt's story "has been rewritten full of L. Ron Hubbard's 'scientology' — but it's still good reading".
