= The War Against the Rull =

1959 novel by A.E. Van Vogt

- First edition
- Author: A. E. van Vogt
- Cover artist: Ronald Clyne
- Language: English
- Genre: Science fiction
- Published: 1959 (Simon & Schuster)
- Publication place: United States of America
- Media type: Print (Hardback)
- Pages: 244 (Hardback edition)
- OCLC: 661127

The War Against the Rull is a science fiction novel by American writer A. E. van Vogt, first published in 1959 by Simon & Schuster. The novel is a fixup made from six (after 1999, seven) short stories and two newly-written connecting chapters.

== Contents ==
The novel consists mainly of six short stories, all originally published in Astounding Science Fiction:

- Chapters 1-4: "Co-Operate - Or Else!" (April 1942)
- Chapter 5: new material, bridging the gap between the first and second stories
- Chapters 6-7: "Repetition" (also known as "The Gryb": April 1940)
- Chapters 8-13: "The Second Solution" (October 1942)
- Chapters 14-16: "The Green Forest" (June 1949)
- Chapters 17-19: "The Sound" (February 1950)
- Chapter 20: new material, bridging the gap between the fifth and sixth stories
- Chapters 21-25: "The Rull" (May 1948)

A seventh story, "The First Rull" (first published in the 1978 collection Pendulum), was included as a 26th chapter in the 1999 reprint and all subsequent editions.

== Plot ==
1-4: Dr. Trevor Jamieson is stranded on the deadly jungle planet Eristan II with an ezwal, a 3-ton, six-legged, telepathic saurian-like creature that dislikes humans. Having bailed out of a crashing spaceship, Jamieson and the hostile and contemptuous ezwal - whose goal is to drive human colonists off his homeworld of Carson's Planet - must cross hundreds of miles of jungle to make their way to the ship's wreckage. The two need each other to survive, but the ezwal cannot allow Jamieson to leave Eristan II alive, as he is the only human to knows that ezwals are sapient. Their journey is interrupted by the appearance of a warship belonging to the Rull, worm-like creatures who are implacably hostile to all intelligent life. A Rull landing party capture the ezwal, who gives up on his plan of enlisting them against humans after meeting them face to face. An Earth battleship appears and destroys the Rull cruiser; after the Rull landing party is killed by a semi-intelligent carnivorous plant, Jamieson allows the ezwal to join him in their shuttle and flies them to safety.

5: Jamieson returns the ezwal to Carson's Planet, vital as a base to the human war effort. As they part, the ezwal rejects Jamieson's request that the ezwals develop a mechanical civilization capable of fending off the Rull. Jamieson finds a similar intransigence in the human settlers, all of whom have had family members killed by ezwals, and who are angered by his suggestion that the planet be returned to its native species. One young woman tells him that Carson's Planet's habitable moon could be used as a base instead, and offers to take him to see it.

6-7: On Carson's Satellite, Barbara Whitman instead attempts to kill Jamieson, leaving them stranded in hostile wilderness. During the hike back to safety, Jamieson uses his wilderness-survival skills to obtain food for them and save them from a blood-sucking gryb. Several days later, his battleship finds and rescues them.

8-13: Jamieson had ordered a female ezwal and her cub to be taken to Earth. Damaged in battle, the ship carrying the ezwals crashes in Alaska; a crewman kills the mother ezwal, who kills him in turn before dying. The cub manages to escape and is pursued over the landscape by men who believe he is merely an animal. Jamieson arrives as the men are closing in and manages to convince the young ezwal that he needs to cooperate with humans in order to make them understand that ezwals are intelligent beings.

14-16: On Earth, Jamieson heads a project to develop a bioweapon against the Rull from lifeforms native to the jungles of the planet Mira 23. Kidnaped by Rull agents, he is taken to Mira and left in the jungle as prey for the planet's lethal fauna. The Rull plan is to frame the project's local leader for his murder, but their agents are instead killed by a native creature, and Jamieson is rescued.

17-19: In Solar City on Earth, a giant spaceship is being built in a highly-secure shipyard. The city's children sometimes spend the night exploring the shipyard, hoping to find the source of a mysterious sound. Jamieson's nine-year-old son Diddy leaves home for his first all-night quest, but is waylaid by Rull spies and saboteurs, who use him to gain access to sections of the shipyard protected from Rulls by the biological weapons obtained from Mira 23. With the aid of counterintelligence agents - who are communicating with him telepathically via the ezwal cub - Diddy manages to lure the Rulls into a building in which they cannot use their organic weapons, and kills them with a gun provided to him.

20: With the ezwal cub accompanying him, Jamieson goes to the planet Ploia to capture one of the natives. Made up entirely of electromagnetic fields, the Ploian causes electrical systems to fail, so Jamieson must use purely mechanical devices to control his ship. Through the ezwal's telepathic ability, he makes contact with the Ploian, which agrees to help him in return for a promise to return it home.

21-25: Jamieson travels directly from Ploia to Laertes III, to make a preliminary survey of the planet as a base of operations against the Rull. A Rull survey craft disables his lifeboat, but is itself shot down. Jamieson engages the Rull pilot in a battle of wits; after ten days, he manages to condition the Rull with a subconscious belief that the war is futile. The Rull manages to capture Jamieson, but the Ploian frees him, and they escape together in a Rull lifeboat. The Rull Jamieson had subverted turns out to have been a Prime Leader of his species and does, indeed, move to de-escalate the conflict.

26: At an Earth university before the outbreak of the war, a Rull infiltrator works to retrieve a piece of lost Rull technology while also sabotaging experiments, murdering students, and generally sowing chaos and confusion, before departing the planet with a low opinion of humanity in general and college life in particular.

== Continuity ==
In compiling his short magazine fiction into novel-length fixups, van Vogt often modified plots or transplanted protagonists to fit originally unrelated works into a single continuity; The War Against the Rull is highly characteristic in this regard, as three of the six constituent stories were (as initially published) wholly unrelated to the Rull series, and only two of the six had originally featured the novel's overall protagonist, Dr. Trevor Jamieson.

The oldest of the stories, 1940's "Repetition," had - in its initial form - contained no intelligent aliens at all, being set on the Jovian moon of Europa before humanity had ventured outside the Solar System, during a period of political tension between Earth and a human-colonized Mars. The 1959 rewrite moved the action to a satellite of the fictional Carson's Planet, and replaced the original protagonist with Jamieson. (Van Vogt also forgot to remove the original story's references to Europa's colonial cities and mines, creating an inconsistency, as Carson's Satellite had earlier been specified to be uninhabited.)

The Rulls were introduced in "Co-Operate - Or Else!" (1942), where they served largely as a narrative device driving the story's primary plot: the human attempt to secure the cooperation of the ezwals, a non-technological species pretending to be non-sapient in an attempt to frustrate human colonization of their homeworld. The fixup version had only a few changes; it made the ezwal slightly less murderous towards humans, but also altered the ending to make it definitively refuse to cooperate with them.

"The Second Solution" (also from 1942) only involved humans and ezwals. It was substantially expanded for the fixup, with more scenes of the ezwal cub dealing with Earth wildlife; the original protagonist, Jamieson's assistant Caleb Carson, was replaced with Jamieson himself.

The 1948 novella "The Rull" is the only component of the fixup in which a human and Rull actually confront each other directly, and is also the only one told partially from the Rull perspective: they are revealed to be an extragalactic species whose own name for themselves is "Ria," and who believe themselves to be the perfect organism (all other intelligent life being therefore "unnecessary.") Both this story and "Co-Operate - Or Else!" describe the Rulls as bone-white, muscular, carnivorous worm-like beings who either slither or ambulate with the aid of with numerous suckers (which also serve as mouths), and a feeding habit which involves paralyzing large prey (including humans) before burrowing into a carcass and consuming it from the inside. They possess a very rapid metabolism, and a sufficient understanding of human psychology to compel humans to commit suicide via hypnotic suggestions encoded into simple images. The fixup incorporated the Ploian alien from the preceding interpolation into the plot, and expanded the ending, in which Jamieson was promoted to the equivalent of secretary-general of a UN-like Galactic Convention.

The original versions of "The Green Forest" and "The Sound" (1949, 1950) took place in one of van Vogt's unrelated continuities, a conflict between humanity and a very different enemy, the Yevds. Unlike the implacably-hostile Rulls, the Yevds had previously communicated with humans and even exchanged ambassadors, with the two species presently engaged in a relatively low-intensity territorial war. They were also physically quite unlike the Rulls, being tall, angular, and black, with many reticulated piston-like arms and legs. Incapable of hearing without mechanical assistance, they communicated via modulated light and had an organic, chameleon-like ability to project holographic disguises and fire energy blasts. (Some of these qualities were transferred to the Rulls in the fixup, considerably muddling their nature.)

The 1978 story "The First Rull" is a prequel describing the activities of a Rull infiltrator on Earth, seemingly before the outbreak of the human-Rull war. Its semi-satirical and sexually-frank tone is very different from that of the rest of the series.

== Publication history ==
- 1959, USA, Simon & Schuster, Pub date Sep 1959, Hardback (244 pp)
- 1961, UK, Panther Books Ltd. (#1168), Pub date Feb 1961 (also Oct 1962), Paperback (156 pp)

== Reviews ==
The book was reviewed by

- Damon Knight at The Magazine of Fantasy and Science Fiction (Jan 1960)
- S. E. Cotts at Amazing Science Fiction Stories (Jan 1960)
- Frederik Pohl at If (May 1960)
- P. Schuyler Miller at Astounding/Analog Science Fact & Fiction (May 1960)
- Floyd C. Gale at Galaxy Magazine (Jun 1960)
- John T. Phillifent at Vector 11 (Spring 1961)
- P. Schuyler Miller at Analog Science Fact - Science Fiction (Jun 1963)
- Gérard Klein at Fiction #115 (1963, France)
- Charlie Brown at Locus #50 (1970 Mar 19)
- Bernard Blanc at Fiction #242 (1974, France)
- Lester del Rey at Analog Science Fiction/Science Fact (Jul 1978)
- Don Webb at The New York Review of Science Fiction (Nov 1999)
- Paul Di Filippo at Asimov's Science Fiction (Aug 2000)

== Sources ==
- Clute, John. "van Vogt, A E." The Encyclopedia of Science Fiction. Eds. John Clute, David Langford, Peter Nicholls and Graham Sleight. Gollancz, 12 May 2016. Web. 5 Aug. 2016. <http://www.sf-encyclopedia.com/entry/van_vogt_a_e>.
- Holdstock, Robert, Ed., Encyclopedia of Science Fiction, London: Cathay Books, Pg. 107, ISBN 0-86178-186-4, 1978.
- Tuck, Donald H. (1974). The Encyclopedia of Science Fiction and Fantasy. Chicago: Advent. pg. 432. ISBN 0-911682-20-1.
