= Rogue Ship =

Book by A.E. van Vogt

- First edition
- Author: A. E. van Vogt
- Cover artist: Peeter Rauch
- Language: English
- Series: Centaurus
- Genre: Science fiction
- Publisher: Doubleday
- Publication date: October 1965
- Publication place: United States
- Media type: Print (Hardcover)
- Pages: 213
- OCLC: 23043729

Rogue Ship is a 1965 science fiction novel by Canadian-American writer A. E. van Vogt, adapted from three short stories to form a novel. The three short stories used were:

- "Centaurus II" (Originally published in Astounding Science-Fiction, June 1947)
- "Rogue Ship" (Originally published in Super Science Stories, March 1950)
- "The Expendables" (Originally published in if Worlds of Science Fiction, September 1963)

Using Van Vogt's own terminology when creating a novel from 3 previous short stories, he named it a fixup.

== Plot summary ==
Centaurus is the destination of the space ship The Hope of Man. It has been traveling through space for almost twenty years, and still has nine years of flight remaining. For many on board the craft, Earth has become a vague memory, while for others it is a mere dot in the vast starry reaches of space. Restlessness is evident everywhere; the people want to return to a place they know is inhabited - not continue to an unknown where life is uncertain. Mutiny seems inevitable. Captain Lesbee (the ship's main officer) knows that mutiny breeds mutiny, but what is more significant is his knowledge of Earth's possible obliteration. The one hope is Centaurus. Now more than ever, there can be no turning back. Order has to be maintained even at the price of human life.

After reaching Centaurus and finding it unsuitable for human life, The Hope of Man heads towards the next destination, the Alta system. Because the ship is unable to attain light speed it takes decades to travel there. Upon arriving in the system, after mutiny and treachery, The Hope of Man is now captained by Browne, a descendant of the ship's original First Officer. The Hope of Man enters into orbit around Alta III, but find it already inhabited and come under attack from the occupants. During this time we see a struggle for power by various groups. Control changes quickly from one character to another until the arrival of the ship's owner, Averill Hewitt. The novel concludes with Hewitt in charge and the ship finding many planets to inhabit.
