= Mindcage (disambiguation) =

Mindcage is a 2022 American mystery thriller film.

Mindcage may also refer to:

- "Mindcage" (song), a song by My Life with the Thrill Kill Kult from the album Hit & Run Holiday
- Mindcage Rick (a.k.a. MindCage), a member of the American musical group Ego Likeness

== See also ==
- Mind Cage (disambiguation)
