= Fix-up =

Novel created from published short stories

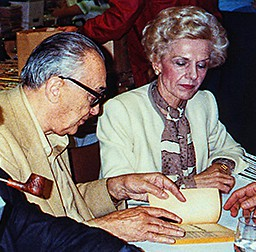
A. E. van Vogt and Lydia van Vogt at a book signing

A fix-up (or fixup) is a novel created from several short fiction stories that may or may not have been initially related or previously published. The stories may be edited for consistency, and sometimes new connecting material, such as a frame story or other interstitial narration, is written for the new work.

The term was coined by the science fiction writer A. E. van Vogt, who published several fix-ups of his own, including The Voyage of the Space Beagle, but the practice (if not the term) also exists outside of science fiction. The use of the term in science fiction criticism was popularised by the first (1979) edition of The Encyclopedia of Science Fiction, edited by Peter Nicholls, which credited van Vogt with the term’s creation. The name "fix-up" comes from the changes that the author needs to make in the original texts, to make them fit together as though they were a novel. Foreshadowing of events from the later stories may be jammed into an early chapter of the fix-up, and character development may be interleaved throughout the book. Contradictions and inconsistencies between episodes are usually worked out.

Some fix-ups in their final form are more of a short story cycle or composite novel, rather than a traditional novel with a single main plotline. Examples are Ray Bradbury's The Martian Chronicles and Isaac Asimov's I, Robot, both of which read as a series of short stories which may share plot threads and characters, but which still act as self-contained stories. By contrast, van Vogt's The Weapon Shops of Isher is structured like a continuous novel, although it incorporates material from three previous van Vogt short stories.

Fix-ups became an accepted practice in American publishing during the 1950s, when science fiction and fantasy—once published primarily in magazines—increasingly began appearing in book form. Large book publishers like Doubleday and Simon & Schuster entered the market, greatly increasing demand for fiction. Authors created new manuscripts from old stories, to sell to publishers. Algis Budrys in 1965 described fixups as a consequence of the lack of good supply during the "bad years for quality" of the mid-1950s, although citing The Martian Chronicles and Clifford D. Simak's City as exceptions.

== Examples ==
=== Science fiction and fantasy ===
- Slan (1946) by A. E. van Vogt
- The Book of Ptath (1947) by A. E. van Vogt
- The World of Null-A (1948) by A. E. van Vogt
- Triplanetary by E. E. Smith
- The Voyage of the Space Beagle (1950) by A. E. van Vogt
- The Martian Chronicles (1950) by Ray Bradbury
- The Dying Earth (1950) by Jack Vance
- I, Robot (1951) by Isaac Asimov
- Foundation (1951) by Isaac Asimov
- City (1952) by Clifford D. Simak
- The Mixed Men (1952) by A. E. van Vogt
- Foundation and Empire (1952) by Isaac Asimov
- More Than Human (1953) by Theodore Sturgeon
- Mutant (1953) by Henry Kuttner and C. L. Moore (as Lewis Padgett)
- Second Foundation (1953) by Isaac Asimov
- The Weapon Shops of Isher (1954) by A. E. van Vogt
- Earthman, Come Home (1955) by James Blish
- Men, Martians and Machines (1955) by Eric Frank Russell
- Hell's Pavement (1955) by Damon Knight
- Lest We Forget Thee, Earth (1958) by Robert Silverberg (as Calvin M. Knox)
- The Outward Urge (1959) by John Wyndham (as John Wyndham and Lucas Parkes)
- A Canticle for Leibowitz (1959) by Walter M. Miller Jr.
- The War Against the Rull (1959) by A. E. van Vogt
- The Great Explosion (1962) by Eric Frank Russell
- Hothouse (1962) by Brian Aldiss
- Savage Pellucidar (1963) by Edgar Rice Burroughs
- Stormbringer (1965) by Michael Moorcock
- Rogue Ship (1965) by A. E. van Vogt
- The Beast (1965) by A. E. van Vogt
- The Eyes of the Overworld (1966) by Jack Vance
- Counter-Clock World (1967) by Philip K. Dick
- Pavane (1968) by Keith Roberts
- The Silkie (1969) by A. E. van Vogt
- The Ship Who Sang (1969) by Anne McCaffrey
- Quest for the Future (1970) by A. E. van Vogt
- Half Past Human (1971) by T. J. Bass
- Operation Chaos (1971) by Poul Anderson
- Puzzle of the Space Pyramids (1971) by Eando Binder
- To Your Scattered Bodies Go (1971) by Philip José Farmer
- The Fabulous Riverboat (1971) by Philip José Farmer
- The World Inside (1971) by Robert Silverberg
- 334 (1972) by Thomas M. Disch
- The Godmakers (1972) by Frank Herbert
- To Ride Pegasus (1973) by Anne McCaffrey
- A World Out of Time (1976) by Larry Niven
- In the Ocean of Night (1977) by Gregory Benford
- The Mercenary (1977) by Jerry Pournelle
- If the Stars are Gods (1977) by Gregory Benford and Gordon Eklund
- Born to Exile (1978) by Phyllis Eisenstein
- Space War Blues (1978) by Richard A. Lupoff
- Catacomb Years (1979) by Michael Bishop
- The World and Thorinn (1981) by Damon Knight
- Windhaven (1981) by George R. R. Martin and Lisa Tuttle
- The Dark Tower: The Gunslinger (1982) by Stephen King
- The Crucible of Time (1983) by John Brunner
- Icehenge (1984) by Kim Stanley Robinson
- Emergence (1984) by David R. Palmer
- The Postman (1985) by David Brin
- Saturnalia (1986) by Grant Callin
- Tuf Voyaging (1986) by George R. R. Martin
- Life During Wartime (1987) by Lucius Shepard
- A Different Flesh (1988) by Harry Turtledove
- Prince of Mercenaries (1989) by Jerry Pournelle
- Mirabile (1991) by Janet Kagan
- The Sword of Destiny (1992) by Andrzej Sapkowski
- Crashlander (1994) by Larry Niven
- Amnesia Moon (1995) by Jonathan Lethem (fix-up of all previously unpublished stories)
- Vacuum Diagrams (1997) by Stephen Baxter
- Kirinyaga (1998) by Mike Resnick
- Rainbow Mars (1999) by Larry Niven
- From the Dust Returned (2001) by Ray Bradbury
- Coyote (2002) by Allen Steele
- Sister Alice (2003) by Robert Reed
- Roma Eterna (2003) by Robert Silverberg
- The Carpet Makers (2005) by Andreas Eschbach
- Accelerando (2005) by Charles Stross
- From the Files of the Time Rangers (2005) by Richard Bowes
- Central Station (2016) by Lavie Tidhar
- Driftwood (2020) by Marie Brennan

=== Other genres ===
- Scenes of Bohemian Life (1851) by Henri Murger
- Sunshine Sketches of a Little Town (1912) by Stephen Leacock
- The Mystery of Dr. Fu-Manchu (1913) by Sax Rohmer
- The Inimitable Jeeves (1923) by P. G. Wodehouse
- The Big Four (1927) by Agatha Christie
- The Pastures of Heaven (1932) and The Red Pony (1937) by John Steinbeck
- The Unvanquished (1938) by William Faulkner
- The Big Sleep (1939), Farewell, My Lovely (1940) and The Lady in the Lake (1943) by Raymond Chandler
- Report on England, November 1940 (1940) by Ralph Ingersoll
- Go Down, Moses (1942) by William Faulkner
- Dandelion Wine (1957) by Ray Bradbury
- Three for the Chair (1957) by Rex Stout
- Lives of Girls and Women (1971) by Alice Munro
- Who Do You Think You Are? (1978) by Alice Munro
- The Things They Carried (1990) by Tim O'Brien
- Green Shadows, White Whale (1992) by Ray Bradbury
- Trainspotting (1993) by Irvine Welsh
- Throat Sprockets (1994) by Tim Lucas
- Haunted (2005) by Chuck Palahniuk
- A Visit from the Goon Squad (2010) by Jennifer Egan
- The Seven Wonders (2012) by Steven Saylor

== See also ==
- Clip show
- Retroactive continuity
