= Catacomb Years =

1979 novel by Michael Bishop

First edition (publ. Berkley Books) Cover art by Ron Walotsky

Catacomb Years is a novel by Michael Bishop published in 1979.

== Plot summary ==
Catacomb Years is a novel about an oppressive society and the people who are forced to live there.

== Reception ==
Spider Robinson's comments on the book's structure: "Plainly [Bishop] intended the Domed City to be a metaphor for something or other…and it probably worked just fine in some of those individual novelettes, where an emotionally involving story made you overlook a shaky premise. But the "novel" has no emotional continuity... There are a few marvelous stories in this book, and one superb one ["The Samurai and the Willows"], but they are ruined by a setting which exposes their worst weaknesses." Robert Frazier strongly disagrees: "Catacomb Years is not a rough sculpture with visible seams and weak welds; it is a polished puzzle entity a la Miguel Berrocal." Author Elizabeth Lynn was equally impressed: "Bishop takes his wildly diverse plot elements…and weaves them into a shining and almost seamless tapestry… The material, to those who have read the pieces as they appeared…will be familiar and friendly. But set against each other they acquire new significance and a new luster. Bishop's skill at characterization is impressive, as is his ability to juggle his cast and his numerous subplots."

Greg Costikyan reviewed Catacomb Years in Ares Magazine #2 and commented that "The stories are almost universally well-written. The language is sharp and clean; the characters well-rounded; the themes strike a responsive chord. Each stands on its own as a perfectly-crafted gem. The hype on the cover is almost justified, and yet…"

Kirkus Reviews states "Though a series of expository ""interludes"" attempts to link the stories into a more conventional (and shaky) kind of future history, the stories are most impressive on their own terms--bearing witness to the weedlike survival of human instinct and aspiration in the most confining and programmed environment."

== Reviews ==
- Review by Charles N. Brown (1979) in Isaac Asimov's Science Fiction Magazine, April 1979
- Review by Andrew A. Whyte (1979) in Galileo, May 1979
- Review by Andrew Kaveney (1979) in Foundation, #17 September 1979
