= M33 in Andromeda =

Book by A.E. van Vogt

- Cover of the first edition.
- Author: A. E. van Vogt
- Cover artist: Geissmann
- Language: English
- Genre: Science fiction
- Publisher: Paperback Library
- Publication date: April 1971
- Publication place: United States
- Media type: Print (paperback)
- Pages: 252
- OCLC: 2702716

M33 in Andromeda is a collection of six science fiction stories by Canadian-American writer A. E. van Vogt, first published in April 1971.

== Contents ==
- "Siege of the Unseen" (as "The Chronicler" in Astounding Science Fiction, October 1946). It is a short story told by eyewitness accounts in court. Together, these accounts tell a grim story of a man who discovers a third eye on his forehead after a car accident removes the skin covering it. Instead of getting it re-covered, the man attempts to get it to see. The better the man is on enabling the third eye to work, the more he can see a parallel universe where everyone has a third eye begins to creep into his own.
- "Discord in Scarlet" (Astounding Science Fiction, December 1939). A short story where the spaceship Space Beagle, which is flying between our galaxy and the Andromeda Galaxy, runs into an alien life form. The life form is a sentient creature named Ixtl that survived the end and rebirth of the universe. It can control nearly all aspects of its body, survive in the vacuum of space, asexually reproduce, flow through all but the most super dense materials, and eat nearly anything. The crew are able to trick it to leave the ship.
- "M33 in Andromeda" (Astounding Science Fiction, August 1943). A work returning once again to the Space Beagle as it finally arrives at the Andromeda galaxy. As it approaches, the crew are bombarded by message after message to not come any closer and to go home. The sociologist on board proposes that maybe something is just trying to get them to go home and not to keep them from there. They press onward and discover that every planet in the galaxy is covered in rain forests, with the same species on each one. Underneath the rain forests they find ruins of civilizations. They discover that the entire galaxy (or maybe just the areas around the suns) is covered in a light mist of space dust. The mist is a sentient creature that lives off the "life energy" of other creatures. It was originally a self-replicating puff of vapor over a swamp but now embraces the galaxy. To get more life energy it converts whole planets into rain forest worlds. It tried to get the Beagle to leave so it could follow it back to our galaxy and take it over. When the crew figure this out, they set up the means to destroy the mist. The reference to M33 in the title of the story is apparently an error: the galaxy described is the Andromeda Galaxy (M31), rather than the Triangulum Galaxy (M33). The latter is in the constellation Triangulum rather than in that of Andromeda.
- "The Expendables" (Worlds of If, September 1963)
- "Heir Unapparent" (as "Heir Apparent" in Astounding Science Fiction, June 1945). In this story the emperor of the world, who seized control 50 years ago with the aid of a super-weapon that he designed, is dying. He has been poisoned and has 48 hours to live. With his remaining time he has to find out who did it, stop a military take-over and keep his heir apparent (his granddaughter) from taking over.
- "The Weapon Shop" (Astounding Science Fiction, December 1942)
