= The House That Stood Still =

1950 novel by A.E. van Vogt

- Dust-jacket of the first edition
- Author: A. E. van Vogt
- Language: English
- Genre: Science fiction
- Publisher: Greenberg
- Publication date: 1950
- Publication place: United States
- Media type: Print (Hardback)
- Pages: 210
- OCLC: 990522

The House That Stood Still is a science fiction novel by American author A. E. van Vogt, first published in 1950. It was also published under the titles The Mating Cry (1960, revised edition) and The Undercover Aliens (1976).

== Plot outline ==
Through various intrigues and investigations, a California estate lawyer learns that the pre-Toltec stone building upon which his retainer's ancestor, a conquistador, built a mansion four centuries earlier, confers immortality to those who know its secret. A cult of immortals operates secretly from the house and even has spaceships capable of travel to Mars where it has a base.

The lawyer falls for a cult member who tells him an atomic war is imminent and that most of the cultists want to remove the building's stones to Mars to keep their power safe from radioactive fallout. He makes it his mission to prevent the war, secure the secret of the ancient house for the benefit of all humankind, and end up with this woman.

== Reception ==
Damon Knight reviewed the novel favorably, saying "Uncharacteristically [for van Vogt], all the threads in this story have been satisfactorily tied up, and the suspense is kept at a high level." Groff Conklin described the original text as "readable" but criticized it for being short on "ideas, imagination [and] scope", describing it as an Erle Stanley Gardner detective story "forced into a science fiction mold". Forrest J Ackerman reported that the novel "departs considerably" from van Vogt's previous work. The New York Times reviewer Fletcher Pratt found House to be "one of the more original science fiction stories, if not one of the sounder," noting that "it is also frequently impossible to understand precisely what is going on."
