= Enchanted Village =

1950 science fiction short story by A. E. van Vogt

- Short story by A. E. van Vogt
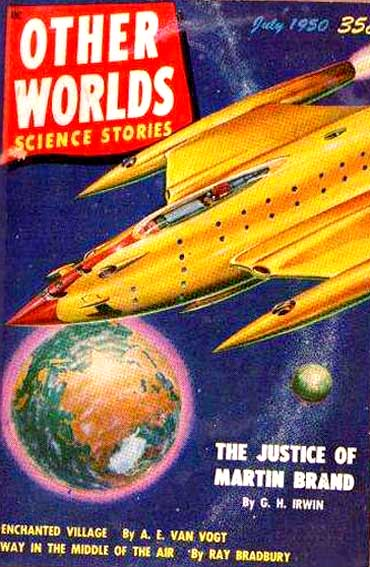
- Country: United States
- Language: English
- Genre: Science fiction

Publication
- Published in: Other Worlds
- Publication type: Periodical
- Media type: Magazine, paperback
- Publication date: July 1950

"Enchanted Village" is a science fiction short story by Canadian-American writer A. E. van Vogt, originally published in Other Worlds in July 1950. It was included in several anthologies, including 1952's Destination: Universe! and adapted to comic format in Unknown Worlds of Science Fiction in July 1975.

It involves a crash-landed explorer on Mars who comes across an ancient Martian town that tries to provide for his every need.

== Plot ==
Bill Jenner is part of an exploration team on their way to Mars. He is the only survivor when their spaceship crashes in the Martian desert. He is trying to reach the shallow polar sea they saw as they approached, but after walking for days it is clear he has misjudged the distance.

As he climbs another dune he looks into the valley on the far side and sees a village made of marble. As he approaches a strange grating sound follows him. Starving and almost out of water, he runs into the town and grabs a fruit from one of the trees. It burns his lips and gums before he spits it out. Drinking a tiny bit of his remaining water, he explores the town and finds it to be completely alien. He falls asleep, exhausted, and wakes to find a poisonous mist falling from the ceiling, forcing him to run from the room. Initially, he believes it to be an attack, but later concludes it was simply a shower, one for an alien body.

Over the next days, Jenner attempts to teach the village how to cater to his needs, replacing the deadly food with something partially edible patterned on the crumbs from his pocket, and providing water after he drips out what remains in his bags. At first relieved, he later notices that the village is destroying itself in order to provide these elements, which are almost unknown on Mars. He realizes his respite will be short; the village will be destroyed keeping him alive for a few days, leaving him no better off than before. Throughout, the noise continues to bother him.

He awakes to the sound of violins, playing a dirge for the Martian race, now long dead. The food produced by the village now taste like a delicious meaty stew and he compliments his meal with a refreshing shower. After days of trying to communicate, the village has finally figured out how to cater to his physical needs by transforming him into a Martian. He shakes the cleaning fluid off his tail and waddles out to bask in the sun.
