= John Gallishaw =

Canadian writer and teacher (1891–1968)

Alonzo John Gallishaw (St. John's, Newfoundland and Labrador, 1891–1968) was a Canadian author and teacher.

== Biography ==
He studied at Harvard until the First World War broke out in 1914. At that point, aged 23, he returned to Canada and joined the Canadian army in Halifax and was assigned to the Cyclist Corps of the Second Division, Canadian Expeditionary Force. In March 1915, he asked for and got a discharge, and on April 3 enlisted in the First Newfoundland regiment which was about to cross the Atlantic and join up with the British army.

In 1915, although most of the soldiers in his regiment were transferred to Aldershot in order to be sent on to Malta, Gallishaw was dispatched to London in order to undertake office work. On the eve of his dispatchment, he took advantage of an order to board a train bound for the embarkation port for Malta. During the journey, he complained to an adjutant who assigned him to B company of the regiment. He took part in the Dardanelles Expedition where he was badly wounded and eventually he was demobilised.

He returned to Harvard but this time as a lecturer. In 1917 the United States joined the war and refusing exemption he enlisted again, this time in the American army. He was sent to France in May 1918 as a sergeant in the 120th Infantry, 30th Infantry Division to join the American Expeditionary Force. By force of circumstances, he became commander of a battalion, joined the United States American Army Intelligence Service and served as a liaison officer with the British forces. Transferred with a promotion to the 58th Infantry Regiment of the 4th Infantry Division, he was severely gassed in August at the Second Battle of the Marne and sent back to the United States; the ship was torpedoed but did not sink. After returning to Harvard late in 1919 he had a breakdown as a result of the gas poisoning and "shell shock". As a result, he moved with his young family to southern California and after trying farming, studied journalism and English at the University of California at Berkeley.

Gallishaw published five books. The first, Trenching at Gallipoli is subtitled A Personal Narrative of a Newfoundlander with the Ill-fated Dardanelles Expedition and was dedicated to Professor Charles Townsend Copeland. His second book, The Man in the Ranks is the tale of a soldier and was written in collaboration with William Lynch.

His three remaining works discussed the writing of books:

1. The Only Two Ways to Write a Story,
2. Twenty Problems of the Fiction Writer, a series of short essays on techniques for the writing of short stories.
3. Advanced Problems of the Fiction Writer, an essay on the form of plots.

Of these, only the first was still in print in 1982.

In addition to these books he published literary analyses and criticism, as well as setting up the John Gallishaw School of Creative Writing in Cambridge, the town where Harvard is situated; the institution moved to New York City around 1927. He wrote material for the theatre, radio and television. He worked in Hollywood as a scriptwriter and teaching screenwriters for Metro-Goldwyn-Mayer (MGM), Columbia Pictures, Paramount and Universal Studios. He worked with Francis Scott Fitzgerald and became friendly with Clark Gable, Robert Young, Cary Grant, Jeanette MacDonald, and Nelson Eddy. During this period he also presented courses at the University of California and at the University of Hawaii.

In 1961, he returned to St. John's for the official opening of the Memorial University of Newfoundland. He died in 1968.

== Works ==
- Trenching at Gallipoli. A Personal Narrative of a Newfoundlander with the Ill-fated Dardanelles Expedition (1916)
- The Man in the Ranks (1917)
- The Only Two Ways to Write a Story (1928)
- Twenty Problems of the Fiction Writer (1929)
- Advanced Problems of the Fiction Writer (1931)
