= Martin Grzimek =

German author (born 1950)

Martin Grzimek (born 1950) is a German author. He was born in Trutzhain. Having spent a number of years living and working in South America and the United States, he now resides in a village near Heidelberg. His work that raised the most interest is Shadowlife, a near-future mystery in which the nature of book itself is questioned. Grzimek is a member of International PEN has won a number of literary prizes.

== Works ==
- Berger, 1980
- Stillstand des Herzens, 1982 (translated as Heartstop: Three Stories by Breon Mitchell)
- Trutzhain, 1984
- Die Beschattung, 1989 (translated as Shadowlife by Breon Mitchell)
- Shadowlife, 1991
- El factor tropical, 1992
- Feuerfalter, 1992
- Ein Bärenleben, 1995 (with Marcus Herrenberger)
- Mostar – Skizzen und Splitter, 1995
- Von einem, der verzweifelt versucht, sich zu verlieben, 1995
- Rudi bärenstark, 1998 (with Marcus Herrenberger)
- Das Austernfest, 2004
- Die unendliche Straße, 2005

== Awards ==
- 1980 Hermann-Hesse-Preis
- 1981 Rauris Literature Prize
- 1982 Literature award of the Kulturkreis der Deutschen Wirtschaft
- 1993 One year scholarship for writers from the Ministerium für Wissenschaft und Kunst des Landes Baden-Württemberg
- 1993 Deutscher Krimi Preis (second place) for "Feuerfalter".
- 1993 Friedrich-Glauser-Preis
- 2001 Scholarship from Künstlerhaus Edenkoben
- 2012 Friedrich-Gerstäcker-Preis

== Literature ==
Klaus Hoffer, "Diese schreckliche Begierde, eine Beziehung herzustellen. Laudatio auf M.G.s Roman Berger," Manuskripte 21, H. 74 (1981), pp. 30–2.
