= Edna Mayne Hull =

Canadian science fiction writer (1905–1975)

E. Mayne Hull
- E Mayne Hull c. 1946
- Born: Edna May Hull; May 1, 1905; Brandon, Manitoba, Canada
- Died: January 20, 1975 (aged 69)
- Occupation: Writer
- Spouse: A. E. van Vogt (1939–1975)
- Writing career
- Period: 1942–1946
- Genre: Science fiction
- Movement: Golden Age of Science Fiction

Edna May Hull van Vogt (May 1, 1905 – January 20, 1975) was a Canadian science fiction writer who published under the name E. Mayne Hull. She was the first wife of A. E. van Vogt, also a science fiction writer.

== Early life and marriage ==
Edna May Hull was born in Brandon, Manitoba, in 1905, the third of six children of Jane and John Thomas Hull. The Hulls had emigrated from England in 1904; Edna's parents and two older siblings had all been born there. Around 1910, Edna and her family moved to Saskatoon, Saskatchewan, where her father worked as a journalist. He later worked as an economist, editor of the Manitoba Wheat Pool's newspaper The Scoop Shovel, and a Wheat Pool executive.

According to Hull herself, "her father's idea for bringing up children was to let his six youngsters read at will in one of the largest private libraries in Western Canada. Then when they expressed an opinion, he would take the opposite viewpoint. Result: fireworks."

Upon reaching adulthood, Edna Hull found work as a private secretary in Alberta for a significant period of time. By the late 1930s, she had moved to Winnipeg, Manitoba, where she met her future husband—then known as Alfred Vogt, but soon to add "van" to his surname. Hull and van Vogt got married on May 9, 1939.

== Writing career ==
For most of her husband's writing career, Hull was his typist. With the advent of WWII only four months after their marriage, the van Vogts moved to Ottawa in late 1939 so that Alfred could work for the Canadian Department of National Defence. Van Vogt continued to write during his off hours, and sold numerous stories through May 1941, at which point he quit his day job and became a writer full-time.

The couple lived for a short time in the Gatineau region of Quebec before moving to Toronto in late 1941. After typing out many of her husband's stories in the early 1940s, Hull began to get ideas for her own science fiction and fantasy tales. Her initial sale, "The Flight That Failed", appeared in the December 1942 issue of Astounding Science Fiction, and was signed "E.M. Hull" (as was all her work through late 1943).

As she continued to sell stories over the next year, Hull's chosen author credit of "E.M. Hull" led to confusion with the novelist of the same name, and an alternative was needed. Disliking her given names, she and van Vogt altered her middle name to come up with the pseudonym "E. Mayne Hull". Later material and all reprints were ascribed to E. Mayne Hull.

Hull's writing career was relatively brief, with virtually all her work having been written during the three years she lived in Toronto. Hull and van Vogt moved to Hollywood in November 1944, and as part of her application for American citizenship in 1945, she legally changed her name from "Edna May Vogt" to "Edna Mayne van Vogt". She then generally went by the name "Mayne" for the rest of her life.

After a year-and-a-half layoff from publishing, Hull's final story, "Bankruptcy Proceedings", appeared in the August 1946 issue of Astounding. One further story, "The Wellwisher", appeared in 1969, but it had been written and sold to the magazine Unknown in 1943. Unfortunately, the magazine had folded before the work could appear in its pages. Hull produced no further new work after 1946. However, several of her previously published short stories were anthologized in the collaborative volume Out Of This World, a 1948 collection of works by both herself and van Vogt.

Hull was well known for her five 'Artur Blord' stories, collected into a single novel under the title Planets For Sale in 1954. Though credited solely to Hull in 1954, the 1965 edition credits van Vogt as co-author. The Winged Man, serialized in Astounding in May and June 1944, appeared as an expanded and revised novel in 1966; the expansion was done with the input of van Vogt, who was then content [as he explains in his book Reflections of A. E. Van Vogt] to add his own name as co-author of the 1966 work.

== Death ==
Hull died of cancer on January 20, 1975, aged 69.

== Bibliography ==
=== Novels ===
- Planets for Sale (1954)
- The Winged Man (1966, with A.E. van Vogt)

=== Collections ===
- Out of the Unknown (1948, with A. E. Van Vogt)[6 stories, OOTU#1 below]
- The Sea Thing and Other Stories (1970, expanded fromOut of the Unknown)[7 stories, TSTAOS below]
- Out of the Unknown (1970, abridged from The Sea Thing and Other Stories)[5 stories, OOTU#2 below]
- The Gryb (1976, with A. E. Van Vogt) [6 stories]

=== Short fiction ===
- "Abdication"
- "Bankruptcy Proceedings" [Artur Blord #5] into Planets for Sale (1954)
- "Competition" [Artur Blord #1] into Planets for Sale (1954)
- "The Contract" [Artur Blord #3] into Planets for Sale (1954)
- "The Debt" [Artur Blord #2] into Planets for Sale (1954)
- "Enter the Professor" [Artur Blord #4] into Planets for Sale (1954)
- "The Flight that Failed" [aka "Rebirth: Earth"]
- "The Patient" (1943) OOTU#1, TSTAOS
- "Research Alpha", with A.E. Van Vogt & James H. Schmitz – van Vogt acknowledges Hull as co-author in his Reflections of A. E. van Vogt
- "The Ultimate Wish" (1943) OOTU#1, TSTAOS, OOTU#2
- "The Wellwisher" TSTAOS (1970, orig), OOTU#2
- "The Wishes We Make" (1943) OOTU#1, TSTAOS, OOTU#2
