= The Mind Cage =

1957 novel by A.E. van Vogt

- Cover of the first edition, published by Simon & Schuster. Art by H. Marcelin.
- Author: A. E. van Vogt
- Language: English
- Publisher: Simon & Schuster
- Publication date: 1957
- OCLC: 1234489
- LC Class: PZ4.V286 Mi

The Mind Cage is a 1957 science fiction novel by American writer A. E. van Vogt, adapted from the short story "The Great Judge" (1948).

== Plot summary ==
David Marin risks his career to defend Wade Trask, a scientist being tried for sedition, but when Trask switches their brains, Marin finds himself branded an enemy of the state.

== Reception ==
Floyd C. Gale wrote that "Van Vogt, master of the tortuous plot, goes through torture to prove it ... [he] still is highly imaginative and his patented jig-saw puzzles are good fun, even though pieces persistently remain missing".
