= A. E. van Vogt =

Canadian-American science fiction writer (1912–2000)

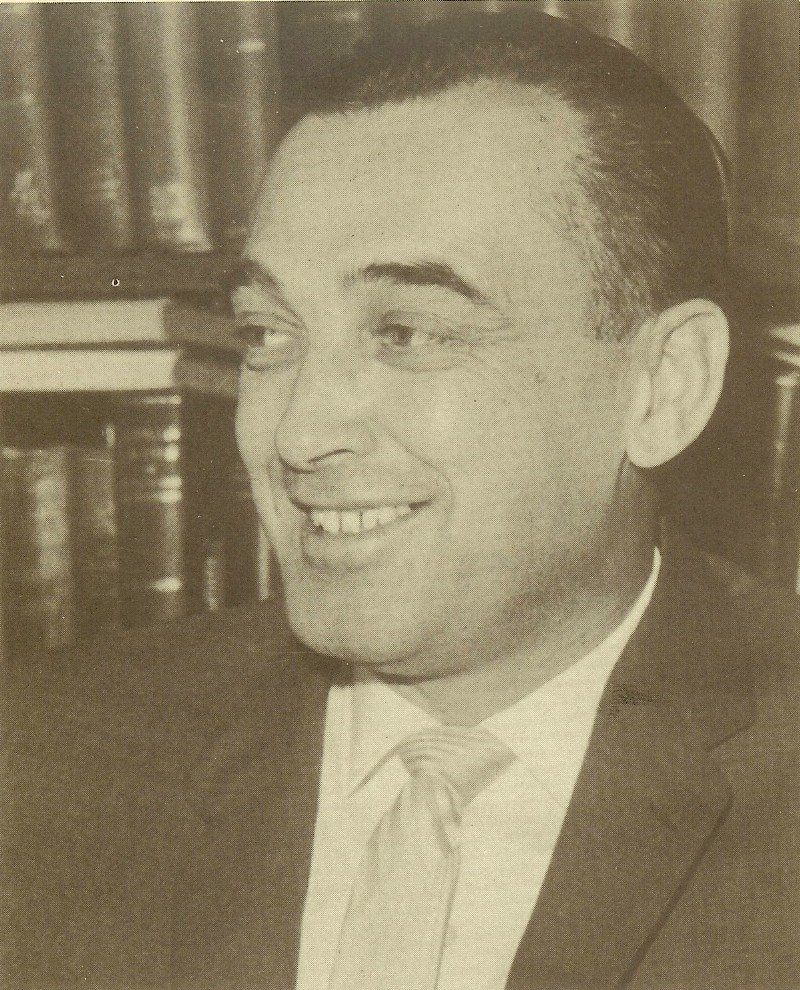
- Van Vogt c. 1962
- Born: Alfred Vogt; April 26, 1912; Edenburg, near Gretna, Manitoba, Canada
- Died: January 26, 2000 (aged 87); Los Angeles, California, US
- Occupation: Writer
- Spouses: Edna Mayne Hull (m. 1939; died 1975) Lydia Bereginsky (m. 1979)
- Writing career
- Period: 1939–1986 (science fiction)
- Genre: Science fiction
- Movement: Golden Age of Science Fiction

Alfred Elton van Vogt (/væn voʊkt/ VAN VOHKT; April 26, 1912 – January 26, 2000) was a Canadian-born American science fiction writer. His fragmented, bizarre narrative style influenced later science fiction writers, including Philip K. Dick. He was one of the most popular and influential practitioners of science fiction in the mid-twentieth century, the genre's so-called Golden Age, and one of the most complex. The Science Fiction Writers of America named him their 14th Grand Master in 1995 (presented 1996).

== Biography ==
=== Early life ===
Alfred Vogt (both "Elton" and "van" were added much later) was born on April 26, 1912, on his grandparents' farm in Edenburg, Manitoba, a tiny (and now defunct) Russian Mennonite community east of Gretna, Manitoba, Canada, in the Mennonite West Reserve. He was the third of six children born to Heinrich "Henry" Vogt and Aganetha "Agnes" Vogt (née Buhr), both of whom were born in Manitoba and grew up in heavily immigrant communities. Until he was four, van Vogt spoke only Plautdietsch at home.

For the first dozen or so years of his life, van Vogt's father, Henry Vogt, a lawyer, moved his family several times within the Prairies, moving to Neville, Saskatchewan; Swift Current, Saskatchewan, and Morden, Manitoba where he lived from 1922 to 1926, before moving to Winnipeg for high school. Alfred Vogt found these moves difficult, later remarking:

Childhood was a terrible period for me. I was like a ship without anchor being swept along through darkness in a storm. Again and again I sought shelter, only to be forced out of it by something new.

By the late 1920s, living in Saskatchewan, his father Henry worked as an agent for a steamship company, but the stock market crash of 1929 proved financially disastrous, and the family could not afford to send Alfred to college. During his teen years, Alfred worked as a farmhand and a truck driver, and by the age of 19, he was working in Ottawa for the Canadian Census Bureau.

In "the dark days of '31 and '32," van Vogt took a correspondence course in writing from the Palmer Institute of Authorship. He sold his first story in fall 1932. His early published works were stories in the true confession style of magazines such as True Story. Most of these stories were published anonymously, with the first-person narratives allegedly being written by people (often women) in extraordinary, emotional, and life-changing circumstances.

After a year in Ottawa, he moved to Winnipeg, Manitoba, where he sold newspaper advertising space and continued to write. While continuing to pen melodramatic "true confessions" stories through 1937, he also began writing short radio dramas for local radio station CKY, as well as conducting interviews published in trade magazines. He added the middle name "Elton" at some point in the mid-1930s, and at least one confessional story (1937's "To Be His Keeper") was sold to the Toronto Star, who misspelled his name "Alfred Alton Bogt" in the byline. Shortly thereafter, he added the "van" to his surname, and from that point forward he used the name "A. E. van Vogt" both personally and professionally.

=== Early career ===
By 1938, van Vogt decided to switch to writing science fiction, a genre he enjoyed reading. He was inspired by the August 1938 issue of Astounding Science Fiction, which he picked up at a newsstand. John W. Campbell's novelette "Who Goes There?" (later adapted into The Thing from Another World and The Thing) inspired van Vogt to write "Vault of the Beast", which he submitted to that same magazine. Campbell, who edited Astounding (and had written the story under a pseudonym), sent van Vogt a rejection letter in which Campbell encouraged van Vogt to try again. Van Vogt sent another story, entitled "Black Destroyer", which was accepted. It featured a fierce, carnivorous alien stalking the crew of a spaceship, and served as the inspiration for multiple science fiction movies, including Alien (1979). (Note: This [The voyage of the Space Beagle] is the classic 'bug-eyed monster' novel, the unacknowledged inspiration for the film Alien and scores of similar — David Pringle, (1990) "The Ultimate Guide to Science Fiction", Grafton Books, page 346. The stories collected in The Voyage of the Space Beagle were perhaps the first to chronicle the adventures of the crew of a large, military-style starship exploring the universe, and doubtless influenced Gene Roddenberry strongly when he created Star Trek. ... One of the Space Beagle stories purportedly inspired the movie Alien - the resemblance was great enough that van Vogt brought a lawsuit against the filmmakers, which reportedly settled for a $50,000 payment. — Aaron Hughes, "Neglected Masters Book Review" retrieved 2010-09-09... The Voyage Of The Space Beagle (1950), later inspired the original Star Trek series and the movie Alien. — Trent Walters, "Oh, the Humanity of A.E. van Vogt's Monsters: Reorienting Critics and Readers to the van Vogt Method" retrieved 2010-09-09. 'Black Destroyer' has been cited as the inspiration for the movie Alien and its many sequels and imitations — Gerald Jonas, (2000) "A. E. van Vogt, 87, Forceful Science-Fiction Voice", New York Times obituary, 2000-02-04 Alien is thus virtually a film version or translation of "Black Destroyer". (Van Vogt is not credited, and as it turns out he sued the film-makers for plagiarism; the latter settling out of court. — Fredric Jameson, Archaeologies of the Future. The Desire Called Utopia and Other Science Fictions (New York: Verso, 2005, pp. 325)) A revised version of "Vault of the Beast" was published in 1940.

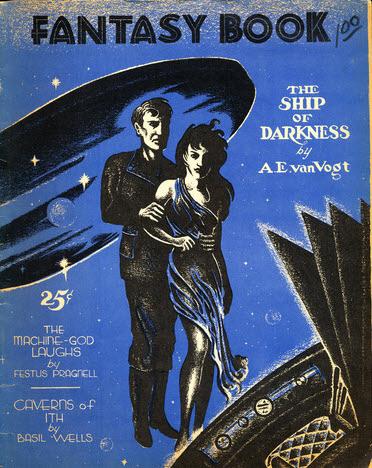
Van Vogt's "Ship of Darkness" was the cover story in the second issue of Fantasy Book in 1948.

While still living in Winnipeg, in 1939 van Vogt married Edna Mayne Hull, a fellow Manitoban. Hull, who had previously worked as a private secretary, went on to act as van Vogt's typist, and was credited with writing several SF stories of her own throughout the early 1940s.

The outbreak of World War II in September 1939 caused a change in van Vogt's circumstances. Ineligible for military service due to his poor eyesight, he accepted a clerking job with the Canadian Department of National Defence. This necessitated a move back to Ottawa, where he and his wife stayed for the next year and a half.

Meanwhile, his writing career continued. "Discord in Scarlet" was van Vogt's second story to be published, also appearing as the cover story. It was accompanied by interior illustrations created by Frank Kramer (Note: According to ISFDB, writer van Vogt and illustrator Kramer both made their debuts, at least in speculative fiction, with "The Black Destroyer". "Frank Kramer – Summary Bibliography". ISFDB. Retrieved 2013-04-04.) and Paul Orban. (Van Vogt and Kramer thus debuted in the issue of Astounding that is sometimes identified as the start of the Golden Age of Science Fiction.) Among his most famous works of this era, "Far Centaurus" appeared in the January 1944 edition of Astounding.

Van Vogt's first completed novel, and one of his most famous, is Slan (Arkham House, 1946), which Campbell serialized in Astounding (September to December 1940). Using what became one of van Vogt's recurring themes, it told the story of a nine-year-old superman living in a world in which his kind are slain by Homo sapiens.

Others saw van Vogt's talent from his first story, and in May 1941 van Vogt decided to become a full-time writer, quitting his job at the Canadian Department of National Defence. Freed from the necessity of living in Ottawa, he and his wife lived for a time in the Gatineau region of Quebec before moving to Toronto in the fall of 1941.

Prolific throughout this period, van Vogt wrote many of his more famous short stories and novels in the years from 1941 through 1944. The novels The Book of Ptath and The Weapon Makers both appeared in magazines in serial form during this period; they were later published in book form after World War II. As well, several (though not all) of the stories that were compiled to make up the novels The Weapon Shops of Isher, The Mixed Men and The War Against the Rull were published during this time.

==== California and post-war writing (1944–1950) ====
In November 1944, van Vogt and Hull moved to Hollywood; van Vogt would spend the rest of his life in California. He had been using the name "A. E. van Vogt" in his public life for several years, and as part of the process of obtaining American citizenship in 1945 he finally and formally changed his legal name from Alfred Vogt to Alfred Elton van Vogt. To his friends in the California science fiction community, he was known as "Van".

==== Dianetics and fix-ups (1950–1961) ====
In 1950, van Vogt was briefly appointed as head of L. Ron Hubbard's Dianetics operation in California. Van Vogt had first met Hubbard in 1945, and became interested in his theories, which were published shortly thereafter. Dianetics was the secular precursor to Hubbard's Church of Scientology; van Vogt would have no association with Scientology, as he did not approve of its mysticism.

The California Dianetics operation went broke nine months later, but never went bankrupt, due to van Vogt's arrangements with creditors. Shortly afterward, van Vogt and his wife opened their own Dianetics center, partly financed by his writings, until he "signed off" around 1961. From 1951 until 1961, van Vogt's focus was on Dianetics, and he produced no new fiction.

==== Fix-ups ====
However, during the 1950s, van Vogt retrospectively patched together many of his previously published stories into novels, sometimes creating new interstitial material to help bridge gaps in the narrative. Van Vogt referred to the resulting books as "fix-ups", a term that entered the vocabulary of science-fiction criticism. When the original stories were closely related this was often successful, although some van Vogt fix-ups featured disparate stories thrown together that bore little relation to each other, generally making for a less coherent plot. One of his best-known (and well-regarded) novels, The Voyage of the Space Beagle (1950) was a fix-up of four short stories including "Discord in Scarlet"; it was published in at least five European languages by 1955.

Although Van Vogt averaged a new book title every ten months from 1951 to 1961, none of them were entirely new content; they were all fix-ups, collections of previously published stories, expansions of previously published short stories to novel length, or republications of previous books under new titles and all based on story material written and originally published between 1939 and 1950. Examples include The Weapon Shops of Isher (1951), The Mixed Men (1952), The War Against the Rull (1959), and the two "Clane" novels, Empire of the Atom (1957) and The Wizard of Linn (1962), which were inspired (like Asimov's Foundation series) by Roman imperial history; specifically, as Damon Knight wrote, the plot of Empire of the Atom was "lifted almost bodily" from that of Robert Graves' I, Claudius. (Also, one non-fiction work, The Hypnotism Handbook, appeared in 1956, though it had apparently been written much earlier.)

After more than a decade of running their Dianetics center, Hull and van Vogt closed it in 1961. Nevertheless, van Vogt maintained his association with the organization and was still president of the California Association of Dianetic Auditors into the 1980s.

=== Return to writing & later career (1962–1986) ===
Though the constant re-packaging of his older work meant that he had never really been away from the book publishing world, van Vogt had not published any wholly new fiction for almost 12 years when he decided to return to writing in 1962. He did not return immediately to science fiction, but instead wrote the only mainstream, non-sf novel of his career.

Van Vogt was profoundly affected by revelations of totalitarian police states that emerged after World War II. Accordingly, he wrote a mainstream novel that he set in Communist China, The Violent Man (1962). Van Vogt explained that to research this book he had read 100 books about China. Into this book he incorporated his view of "the violent male type", which he described as a "man who had to be right", a man who "instantly attracts women" and who he said were the men who "run the world". Contemporary reviews were lukewarm at best, and van Vogt thereafter returned to science fiction.

From 1963 through the mid-1980s, van Vogt once again published new material on a regular basis, though fix-ups and reworked material also appeared relatively often. His later novels included fix-ups such as The Beast (also known as Moonbeast) (1963), Rogue Ship (1965), Quest for the Future (1970) and Supermind (1977). He also wrote novels by expanding previously published short stories; works of this type include The Darkness on Diamondia (1972) and Future Glitter (also known as Tyranopolis; 1973).

Novels that were written simply as novels, and not serialized magazine pieces or fix-ups, had been very rare in van Vogt's oeuvre, but began to appear regularly beginning in the 1970s. Van Vogt's original novels included Children of Tomorrow (1970), The Battle of Forever (1971) and The Anarchistic Colossus (1977). Over the years, many sequels to his classic works were promised, but only one appeared: Null-A Three (1984; originally published in French). Several later books were initially published in Europe, and at least one novel only ever appeared in foreign language editions and was never published in its original English.

=== Final years ===
When the 1979 film Alien appeared, it was noted that the plot closely matched the plots of both Black Destroyer and Discord in Scarlet, both published in Astounding magazine in 1939, and then later published in the 1950 book Voyage of the Space Beagle. Van Vogt sued the production company for plagiarism, and eventually collected an out-of-court settlement of $50,000 from 20th Century Fox.

In increasingly frail health, van Vogt published his final short story in 1986. Van Vogt's first wife, Edna Mayne Hull, died in 1975. Van Vogt married Lydia Bereginsky in 1979; they remained together until his death. On January 26, 2000, A. E. van Vogt died in Los Angeles from Alzheimer's disease. He was survived by his second wife.

== Method and themes ==
Van Vogt systematized his writing method, using scenes of 800 words or so where a new complication was added or something resolved. Several of his stories hinge on temporal conundrums, a favorite theme. He stated that he acquired many of his writing techniques from three books: Narrative Technique by Thomas Uzzell, The Only Two Ways to Write a Story by John Gallishaw, and Twenty Problems of the Fiction Writer by Gallishaw. He also claimed many of his ideas came from dreams; throughout his writing life he arranged to be awakened every 90 minutes during his sleep period so he could write down his dreams.

Van Vogt was also always interested in the idea of all-encompassing systems of knowledge (akin to modern meta-systems). The characters in his very first story used a system called "Nexialism" to analyze the alien's behavior. Around this time, he became particularly interested in the general semantics of Alfred Korzybski.

He subsequently wrote a novel merging these overarching themes, The World of Ā, originally serialized in Astounding in 1945. Ā (often rendered as Null-A), or non-Aristotelian logic, refers to the capacity for, and practice of, using intuitive, inductive reasoning (compare fuzzy logic), rather than reflexive, or conditioned, deductive reasoning. The novel recounts the adventures of an individual living in an apparent Utopia, where those with superior brainpower make up the ruling class... though all is not as it seems. A sequel, The Players of Ā (later re-titled The Pawns of Null-A) was serialized in 1948–49.

At the same time, in his fiction, van Vogt was consistently sympathetic to absolute monarchy as a form of government. This was the case, for instance, in the Weapon Shop series, the Mixed Men series, and in single stories such as "Heir Apparent" (1945), whose protagonist was described as a "benevolent dictator". These sympathies were the subject of much critical discussion during van Vogt's career, and afterwards.

Van Vogt published "Enchanted Village" in the July 1950 issue of Other Worlds Science Stories. It was reprinted in over 20 collections or anthologies, and appeared many times in translation.

== Critical reception ==
Critical opinion about the quality of van Vogt's work is sharply divided. An early and articulate critic was Damon Knight. In a 1945 chapter-long essay reprinted in In Search of Wonder, entitled "Cosmic Jerrybuilder: A. E. van Vogt", Knight described van Vogt as "no giant; he is a pygmy who has learned to operate an overgrown typewriter". Knight described The World of Null-A as "one of the worst allegedly adult science fiction stories ever published". Concerning van Vogt's writing, Knight said:

In general van Vogt seems to me to fail consistently as a writer in these elementary ways: 1. His plots do not bear examination. 2. His choice of words and his sentence-structure are fumbling and insensitive. 3. He is unable either to visualize a scene or to make a character seem real.

About Empire of the Atom Knight wrote:

If you can only throw your reasoning powers out of gear—something many van Vogt fans find easy to do—you'll enjoy this one.

Knight also expressed misgivings about van Vogt's politics. He noted that van Vogt's stories almost invariably present absolute monarchy in a favorable light. In 1974, Knight retracted some of his criticism after finding out about Vogt's writing down his dreams as a part of his working methods:

This explains a good deal about the stories, and suggests that it is really useless to attack them by conventional standards. If the stories have a dream consistency which affects readers powerfully, it is probably irrelevant that they lack ordinary consistency.

Knight's criticism greatly damaged van Vogt's reputation. On the other hand, when science fiction author Philip K. Dick was asked which science fiction writers had influenced his work the most, he replied:

I started reading [science fiction] when I was about twelve and I read all I could, so any author who was writing about that time, I read. But there's no doubt who got me off originally and that was A. E. van Vogt. There was in van Vogt's writing a mysterious quality, and this was especially true in The World of Null-A. All the parts of that book did not add up; all the ingredients did not make a coherency. Now some people are put off by that. They think that's sloppy and wrong, but the thing that fascinated me so much was that this resembled reality more than anybody else's writing inside or outside science fiction.

Dick also defended van Vogt against Damon Knight's criticisms:

Damon feels that it's bad artistry when you build those funky universes where people fall through the floor. It's like he's viewing a story the way a building inspector would when he's building your house. But reality really is a mess, and yet it's exciting. The basic thing is, how frightened are you of chaos? And how happy are you with order? Van Vogt influenced me so much because he made me appreciate a mysterious chaotic quality in the universe which is not to be feared.

In a review of Transfinite: The Essential A. E. van Vogt, science fiction writer Paul Di Filippo said:

Van Vogt knew precisely what he was doing in all areas of his fiction writing. There's hardly a wasted word in his stories. ... His plots are marvels of interlocking pieces, often ending in real surprises and shocks, genuine paradigm shifts, which are among the hardest conceptions to depict. And the intellectual material of his fictions, the conceits and tossed-off observations on culture and human and alien behavior, reflect a probing mind. ... Each tale contains a new angle, a unique slant, that makes it stand out.

In The John W. Campbell Letters, Campbell says, "The son-of-a-gun gets hold of you in the first paragraph, ties a knot around you, and keeps it tied in every paragraph thereafter—including the ultimate last one".

Harlan Ellison (who had begun reading van Vogt as a teenager) wrote, "Van was the first writer to shine light on the restricted ways in which I had been taught to view the universe and the human condition".

Writing in 1984, David Hartwell said:

No one has taken van Vogt seriously as a writer for a long time. Yet he has been read and still is. What no one seems to have noticed is that van Vogt, more than any other single SF writer, is the conduit through which the energy of Gernsbackian, primitive wonder stories have been transmitted through the Campbellian age, when earlier styles of SF were otherwise rejected, and on into SF of the present.

The literary critic Leslie A. Fiedler said something similar:

Van Vogt is a test case ... since an apology for or analysis of science fiction which fails to come to terms with his appeal and major importance, defends or defines the genre by falsifying it.

American literary critic Fredric Jameson says of van Vogt:

that van Vogt's work clearly prepares the way for that of the greatest of all Science Fiction writers, Philip K. Dick, whose extraordinary novels and stories are inconceivable without the opening onto that play of unconscious materials and fantasy dynamics released by van Vogt, and very different from the more hard-science aesthetic ideologies of his contemporaries (from Campbell to Heinlein).

Van Vogt still has his critics. For example, Darrell Schweitzer, writing to The New York Review of Science Fiction in 1999, quoted a passage from the original van Vogt novelette "The Mixed Men", which he was then reading, and remarked:

This is the realism, and logic, of a small boy playing with toy soldiers in a sandbox. I'm tougher than you. I've got a billion spaceships! They're brand-new. They only took 800 years to develop. And this is a story in which most of the cast either have two brains or are really robots ... and even the emotions of the human characters are programmed or deprogrammed as part of plots within counter plots. Next to this, Doc Smith was an icy realist. There is no intersection with adult reality at any point, for all van Vogt was able to write was that small boy's sandbox game with an adult level of intensity. This is, I think, the secret of van Vogt's bizarre fascination, as awful as his actual writing might be, and why he appealed so strongly to Philip K. Dick, who managed to put more adult characters and emotions into equally crazy situations. It's ultimately very strange to find this sort of writing so prominently sponsored by supposedly rational and scientifically minded John W. Campbell, when it seems to contravene everything the Golden Age stood for.

== Accolades ==
In 1946, van Vogt and his first wife, Edna Mayne Hull, were Guests of Honor at the fourth World Science Fiction Convention.

In 1980, van Vogt received a "Casper Award" (precursor to the Canadian Prix Aurora Awards) for Lifetime Achievement.

The Science Fiction Writers of America (SFWA) named him its 14th Grand Master in 1995 (presented 1996). Great controversy within SFWA accompanied its long wait in bestowing its highest honor (limited to living writers, no more than one annually). Writing an obituary of van Vogt, Robert J. Sawyer, a fellow Canadian writer of science fiction, remarked:

There was no doubt that van Vogt should have received this honor much earlier—the injustice of him being overlooked, at least in part because of damnable SFWA politics, had so incensed Harlan Ellison, a man with an impeccable moral compass, that he'd lobbied hard on the Sci-Fi Channel and elsewhere on van Vogt's behalf.

It is generally held that a key factor in the delay was "damnable SFWA politics" reflecting the concerns of Damon Knight, the founder of the SFWA, who abhorred van Vogt's style and politics and thoroughly demolished his literary reputation in the 1950s.

Harlan Ellison was more explicit in 1999 introduction to Futures Past: The Best Short Fiction of A. E. van Vogt:

[A]t least I was able to make enough noise to get Van the Science Fiction Writers of America Grand Master Award, which was presented to him in full ceremony during one of the last moments when he was cogent and clearheaded enough to understand that finally, at last, dragged kicking and screaming to honor him, the generation that learned from what he did and what he had created had, at last, 'fessed up to his importance. ... were the same ones who assured me that Van would never get the Grand Master until Damon Knight had gotten it first, because Damon had loathed Van's work and had, in fact written the essay that ridiculed Van and held him up to opprobrium for decades thereafter, and Damon having founded SFWA it would be an affront to him if Van got it first. Well, I don't know if that's true or not, though it was common coin in the field for years; but Damon got the Grand Master award in 1994. And Van got it in 1995. (Note: The award was presented to Knight and van Vogt in 1995 and 1996 respectively, the years following selection. It is restricted to living authors, no more than one annually. It was renamed the Damon Knight Memorial Grand Master (Award) after Knight's death in 2002.) As they say during sweeps week on television: coincidence or conspiracy?

In 1996, van Vogt received a Special Award from the World Science Fiction Convention "for six decades of golden age science fiction". That same year, the Science Fiction and Fantasy Hall of Fame inducted him in its inaugural class of two deceased and two living persons, along with writer Jack Williamson (also living) and editors Hugo Gernsback and John W. Campbell.

The works of van Vogt were translated into French by the surrealist Boris Vian (The World of Null-A as Le Monde des Å in 1958), and van Vogt's works were "viewed as great literature of the surrealist school". In addition, Slan was published in French, translated by Jean Rosenthal, under the title À la poursuite des Slans, as part of the paperback series 'Editions J'ai Lu: Romans-Texte Integral' in 1973. This edition also listing the following works by van Vogt as having been published in French as part of this series: Le Monde des Å, La faune de l'espace, Les joueurs du Å, L'empire de l'atome, Le sorcier de Linn, Les armureries d'Isher, Les fabricants d'armes, and Le livre de Ptath. Van Vogt's last novel, 1985's To Conquer Kiber, has only been released in French (as À la conquête de Kiber.)

== Works ==
=== Novels and novellas ===
The following table can be sorted to show van Vogt's novels in chronological order, or arranged alphabetically by title, or by series. Primary dates list first publication in book form.
Year	Title	Series	Notes	Alternate titles
1946	Slan		Originally serialized in Astounding Science Fiction, September – December 1940.	
1947	The Weapon Makers	Isher	Significantly revised version of a novel serialized in Astounding Science Fiction, February – April 1943 It was revised again in 1952.	One Against Eternity (1964)
1947	The Book of Ptath		Originally appeared (complete) in Unknown, October 1943.	Two Hundred Million A.D. (1964); Ptath (1976)
1948	The World of Ā	Null-A	Revised and shortened version of a novel originally serialized in Astounding Science Fiction, August – October 1945. It was revised again in 1970.	The World of Null-A (all editions from 1953 forward)
1950	The House That Stood Still			The Mating Cry (1960, revised); The Undercover Aliens (1976)
1950	The Voyage of the Space Beagle		Fix-up of four short stories, originally published 1939 – 1950.	Mission: Interplanetary (1952)
1951	The Weapon Shops of Isher	Isher	Fix-up of three short stories, originally published from 1941 to 1949.	
1952	The Mixed Men		Fix-up of three short stories, originally published 1943 to 1945. Significant modifications to the second story and a new 18,000 word section inserted between it and the first one, plus a new chapter-length epilogue.	Mission to the Stars (1955)
1953	The Universe Maker		Extensively rewritten and expanded version of the short story "The Shadow Men" (1950).	
1954	The Pawns of Null-A	Null-A	Originally serialized (as The Players of Ā) in Astounding Science Fiction, October 1948–January 1949.	The Players of Null-A (1966)
1957	The Mind Cage		Extensively rewritten and expanded version of the short story "The Great Judge" (1948].	
1957	Empire of the Atom	Clane	Fix-up of five short stories, originally published 1946 to 1947.	
1959	Siege of the Unseen		Originally serialized (as The Chronicler) in Astounding Science Fiction, October – November 1946.	The Three Eyes of Evil (1973)
1959	The War Against the Rull		Fix-up of six short stories, originally published 1940 – 1950.	
1960	Earth's Last Fortress		Novella. Originally appeared (complete, as "Recruiting Station") in Astounding Science Fiction, March 1942.	Collected as "Masters Of Time" in the van Vogt collection Masters Of Time (1950).
1962	The Wizard of Linn	Clane	Originally serialized in Astounding Science Fiction, April–June 1950.	
1962	The Violent Man		Non-sf political thriller.	
1963	The Beast		Substantially revised fix-up of three short stories, originally published from 1943 to 1944.	Moonbeast (1969)
1965	Rogue Ship		Fix-up of three short stories, originally published 1947 to 1963.	
1966	The Winged Man (with E. Mayne Hull)		Originally serialized (and credited solely to E. Mayne Hull) in Astounding Science Fiction, May–June 1944. Greatly expanded (from 35,000 to 60,000 words) by van Vogt for book publication.	
1967	The Changeling		Novella, originally appeared (complete) in Astounding Science Fiction, April 1944. Previously collected in the van Vogt collection Masters Of Time (1950).	
1969	The Silkie		Fix-up of three short stories originally published 1964 to 1967.	
1970	Children of Tomorrow			
1970	Quest for the Future		Fix-up of three short stories originally published 1943 to 1946.	
1971	The Battle of Forever			
1972	The Darkness on Diamondia			
1973	Future Glitter			Tyranopolis (1977)
1974	The Man with a Thousand Names			
1974	The Secret Galactics			Earth Factor X (1976)
1977	Supermind		Fix-up of three short stories, originally published 1942 to 1968. The 1965 story "Research Alpha", minimally revised to form chapters 23-36 of this novel, was credited on its original publication to van Vogt and James H. Schmitz.	
1977	The Anarchistic Colossus			
1979	Renaissance			
1979	Cosmic Encounter			
1983	Computerworld			Computer Eye (1985)
1984	Null-A Three	Null-A		
1985	To Conquer Kiber		Unpublished in English. It was published in French as A la conquête de Kiber and in Romanian as Cucerirea Kiberului	

==== Special works published as books ====
- Planets for Sale by E. Mayne Hull (1954). A fix-up of five stories by Hull, originally published 1942 to 1946. Certain later editions (from 1965) credit both authors.
- The Enchanted Village (1979). A 25-page chapbook of a short story originally published in 1950.
- Slan Hunter by Kevin J. Anderson (2007). A sequel to Slan, based an unfinished draft by van Vogt.
- Null-A Continuum by John C. Wright (2008). An authorized continuation of the Null-A series which ignored the events of Null-A Three.

=== Collections ===
- Out of the Unknown (1948), with Edna Mayne Hull
- Masters of Time (1950) (a.k.a. Recruiting Station) [also includes The Changeling, both works were later published separately]
- Triad (1951) omnibus of The World of Null A, The Voyage of the Space Beagle, Slan.
- Away and Beyond (1952) (abridged in paperback in 1959; abridged (differently) in paperback in 1963)
- Destination: Universe! (1952)
- The Twisted Men (1964)
- Monsters (1965) (later as SF Monsters (1967)) abridged as The Blal (1976)
- A Van Vogt Omnibus (1967), omnibus of Planets for Sale (with Edna Mayne Hull), The Beast, The Book of Ptath
- The Far Out Worlds of Van Vogt (1968)
- The Sea Thing and Other Stories (1970) (expanded from Out of the Unknown by adding an original story by Hull; later abridged in paperback as Out of the Unknown by removing 2 of the stories)
- M33 in Andromeda (1971)
- More Than Superhuman (1971)
- The Proxy Intelligence and Other Mind Benders, ), with Edna Mayne Hull (1971), revised as The Gryb (1976)
- Van Vogt Omnibus 2 (1971), omnibus of The Mind Cage, The Winged Man (with Edna Mayne Hull), Slan.
- The Book of van Vogt (1972), also published as Lost: Fifty Suns (1979)
- The Three Eyes of Evil Including Earth's Last Fortress (1973)
- The Best of A. E. van Vogt (1974) later split into 2 volumes
- The Worlds of A. E. van Vogt (1974) (expanded from The Far Out Worlds of Van Vogt by adding 3 stories)
- The Best of A. E. van Vogt (1976) [differs to 1974 edition]
- Away and Beyond (1977)
- Pendulum (1978) (almost all original stories and articles)
- Tales from the Vulgar Unicorn (1980) (one short story by Van Vogt in a fantasy anthology by various authors)
- Futures Past: The Best Short Fiction of A.E. Van Vogt (1999)
- Transfinite: The Essential A.E. van Vogt (2002)
- Transgalactic (2006)

=== Nonfiction ===
- The Hypnotism Handbook (1956, Griffin Publishing Company, with Charles Edward Cooke)
- The Money Personality (1972, Parker Publishing Company Inc., West Nyack, NY, ISBN 978-0-13-600676-3)
- Reflections of A. E. Van Vogt: The Autobiography of a Science Fiction Giant (1975, Fictioneer Books Ltd., Lakemont, GA, LCCN 73-94037)
- A Report on the Violent Male (1992, Paupers' Press, UK, ISBN 978-0-946650-40-8)

== See also ==
- Golden Age of Science Fiction
