= The World of Null-A =

1948 science-fiction novel by A. E. van Vogt

- Cover of first edition (hardcover)
- Author: A. E. van Vogt
- Cover artist: Leo Manso
- Language: English
- Genre: Science fiction
- Publisher: Simon & Schuster
- Publication date: 1948
- Publication place: United States
- Media type: Print (Hardcover & Paperback)
- Pages: 246
- Followed by: The Pawns of Null-A

The World of Null-A, sometimes written The World of Ā, is a 1948 science fiction novel by Canadian-American writer A. E. van Vogt. It was originally published as a three-part serial in 1945 in Astounding Stories. It incorporates concepts from the general semantics of Alfred Korzybski. The name Ā refers to non-Aristotelian logic.

== Plot summary ==
Gilbert Gosseyn (pronounced go-sane), a man living in an apparent utopia where those with superior understanding and mental control rule the rest of humanity, wants to be tested by the giant Machine that determines such superiority. However, he finds that his memories are false. In his search for his real identity, he discovers that he has extra bodies that are activated when he dies (so that, in a sense, he cannot be killed), that a galactic society of humans exists outside the Solar System, a large interstellar empire wishes to conquer both the Earth and Venus (inhabited by masters of non-Aristotelian logic), and he has extra brain matter that, when properly trained, can allow him to move matter with his mind.

== Publication history ==
The novel originally appeared as a serial entitled "The World of Ā" in the August 1945 to October 1945 issues of the magazine Astounding Science Fiction, which was edited by John W. Campbell, Jr.

Van Vogt significantly revised and shortened the tale for the 1948 novel release. Like the serial, the 1948 hardcover (Simon & Schuster) and the 1950 hardcover (Grosset & Dunlap) editions were entitled The World of Ā. To reduce printing costs, the 1953 and 1964 Ace Books paperback editions were entitled The World of Null-A, and the symbol Ā was replaced with "null-A" throughout the text. The 1970 revision kept this change, added some brief new passages to chapters 10, 24, and 35, and also included a new introduction in which van Vogt defended the controversial work, but also admitted that the original serial had been flawed.

== Critical reception ==
It won the Manuscripters Club Award. It was listed by the New York area library association among the hundred best novels of 1948. World of Null-A has been translated into nine languages, and when first published, created the French Science Fiction Market all by itself - according to Jacques Sadoul, editor of Editions OPTA. The World of Null-A finished second in the Retro Hugo award voting for Best Novel of 1945 presented in 1996 at L.A.con III.

For many years, two quotes appeared on the paperback editions of this novel. "Without doubt one of the most exciting, continuously complex and richly patterned science fiction novels ever written!" - Groff Conklin; and "One of those once-in-a-decade classics!" - John Campbell.

In 1945, the novel was the subject of an extended critical essay by fellow author and critic Damon Knight. In the review, which was later expanded into "Cosmic Jerrybuilder: A. E. van Vogt", Knight writes that "far from being a 'classic' by any reasonable standard, The World of Ā is one of the worst allegedly-adult science fiction stories ever published." Knight criticizes the novel on four main levels:

1. Plot: "The World of Ā abounds in contradictions, misleading clues and irrelevant action...It is [van Vogt's] habit to introduce a monster, or a gadget, or an extra-terrestrial culture, simply by naming it, without any explanation of its nature...By this means, and by means of his writing style, which is discursive and hard to follow, van Vogt also obscures his plot to such an extent that when it falls to pieces at the end, the event passes without remark."
2. Characterization: "Van Vogt's characters repeatedly commit the error known as the double-take. This phenomenon is funny because it represents a mental failure...Its cause is inability to absorb a new fact until a ridiculously long time has elapsed. In The World of Ā there are twelve examples in all."
3. Background: "In van Vogt's world, the advancement over 1945...amounts to no more than (a) a world government; (b) a handful of gadgets...van Vogt has not bothered to integrate the gadgets into the technological background of his story, and he has no clear idea of their nature."
4. Style: "Examples of bad writing in The World of Ā could be multiplied endlessly. It is my personal opinion that the whole of it is written badly, with only minor exceptions."

In his author's introduction to the 1970 revised edition, van Vogt acknowledges that he has taken Knight's criticisms seriously, thus the reason for his revising the novel so many years after its original publication.

In 1974 Damon Knight walked back his original criticisms:

Van Vogt has just revealed, for the first time as far as I know, that during this period he made a practice of dreaming about his stories and waking himself up every ninety minutes to take notes. This explains a good deal about the stories, and suggests that it is really useless to attack them by conventional standards. If the stories have a dream consistency which affects readers powerfully, it is probably irrelevant that they lack ordinary consistency.

== Analysis ==
The story is one of the earliest examples of the use of the word and concept of videotelephone in Anglophone literature.

== Sequels ==
The World of Null-A was followed by the sequel, The Pawns of Null-A (also known as The Players of Null-A, 1956), and much later by a follow-up, Null-A Three (1984).

In 2008 John C. Wright wrote a novel as new chapter to the story of Gilbert Gosseyn, Null-A Continuum, in the style of van Vogt.
