= The Mixed Men =

1952 novel by A.E. van Vogt

- Dust-jacket from the first edition.
- Author: A. E. van Vogt
- Cover artist: Ric Binkley
- Language: English
- Genre: Science fiction
- Publisher: Gnome Press
- Publication date: 1952
- Publication place: United States
- Media type: Print (hardback)
- Pages: 223

The Mixed Men is a 1952 fix-up science fiction novel by the Canadian-American writer A. E. van Vogt, a compilation of several shorter pieces written in the early 1940s.

== Contents ==
The novel is an early example of a "fix-up," the combination of several previously published stories into a cohesive book-length work, a practice which van Vogt not only pioneered in the early 50s but informally named. The three stories were originally published between the 1943 and 1945 in Astounding Science Fiction, with a newly-written novella-length bridge between the first and second stories debuting in the 5,000 copy Gnome Press edition in 1952, as well as a new epilogue.

- "Concealment" (Astounding, September 1943) (adapted as the prologue of the book)
- "Lost: Fifty Suns" (new material, later published separately) (corresponding to chapters 1 through 7)
- "The Storm" (Astounding, October 1943) (chapters 8 - 15)
- "The Mixed Men" (Astounding, January 1945) (chapters 16 - 22)
- "Is it True?" (new material; chapter-length epilogue not present in all editions) (chapter 23)

The novel was reissued by Berkley Books in 1955 as Mission to the Stars.

== Setting ==
The story is a typical Golden Age space opera, enlivened by van Vogt's trademark themes of metacognition, mind-control, and paranoid intrigue. It is set at an unspecified date in the far future, at a point when the Milky Way is ruled by a benevolent but centralizing Empire with a population of 300 quintillion. Unbeknownst to the Empire, the Lesser Magellanic Cloud is home to the Fifty Suns, a much-smaller civilization established by refugees from the Milky Way 15,000 years earlier. The Fifty Suns are populated by "robots," though van Vogt uses the term eccentrically; his "robots" are flesh-and-blood humans, descendants of people who had faced violent persecution after being accidentally altered by a matter-teleportation process invented by a man named Joseph M. Dell. They are divided into three groups: "Dellian robots" (who have extraordinary strength, intelligence and willpower, but no faculty for creative thought), "non-Dellian robots" (normal humans), and a very small minority of hybrid "Mixed Men" (who have a single personality but a bicameral consciousness, with separate Dellian and non-Dellian minds and the ability to consciously switch between the two).

Faster-than-light travel exists in the setting, but space is crisscrossed by "storms," violent interactions between matter and antimatter gas clouds, through which a ship cannot pass at superluminal velocity without being destroyed. These storms are monitored and charted by specialized navigators, who are known as "meteorologists." As superluminal ships have very large turning radii, travel through uncharted areas can only be done relatively slowly (at no more than two light-years per hour), to provide a margin of safety for course changes if a storm is detected ahead. In explored areas, travel can be much faster, at up to thirty light-years per hour, with a transit time to the Cloud of about nine months.

== Stories ==
"Concealment" opens in the Lesser Magellanic Cloud, to which the Empire has dispatched the enormous battleship Star Cluster - 4.5 kilometers long, with a crew of thirty thousand, commanded by the young noblewoman the Lady Gloria Cecily Laurr - on a ten-year mission of exploration. By chance, the ship comes across a "meteorological" station in an uninhabited system. Its operator immediately broadcasts an alert to the Fifty Suns and blows himself up, but Grand Captain Laurr orders him to be "reconstituted," in order to learn the location of his homeworld and of the local meteorological conditions (which would enable the Star Cluster to move rapidly around the Cloud.) The resurrected operator is a Mixed Man, who proves uncooperative; when Grand Captain Laurr puts herself at personal risk to draw information from him, he immediately attempts to assassinate her, but fails and is killed a second time. The disappointed Grand Captain Laurr notes that the Empire will now have to methodically search the entire Cloud to discover one of the Fifty Suns, which will - in the absence of reliable meteorological data - take decades.

"Lost: Fifty Suns" begins on Lant, an outer world of the Fifty Suns. Captain Peter Maltby, a Mixed Man and military astrogator, is distrusted by his comrades, as his people had attempted a coup against the Fifty Suns a generation ago and been defeated; however, they do not know that Maltby is secretly the hereditary leader of the Mixed Men. In a public broadcast, Grand Captain Laurr announces that she knows of the Fifty Suns, but does not know their location. She declares that - due to the risk of war - "Earth [will] not permit a separate sovereign state anywhere in the universe," and that the humans of the Cloud must reveal themselves and consent to be annexed, though she promises autonomy, democracy, and respect for human rights. Maltby learns that his rival among the Mixed Men, the firebrand Hunston, is considering either betraying the Fifty Suns to Earth in exchange for status or using their people's hypnotic powers to seize the Earth battleship for use against the Fifty Suns. Maltby is then summoned to a high-level government conference, where he is asked to convey a message to the Mixed Men, offering amnesty and increased civil rights in exchange for forming a joint front against the Empire.

Meanwhile, Grand Captain Laurr is troubled with dissension among her ranks, as much of her crew does not wish to spend years trying to find the hidden separatist worlds. Faced with urgency, she broadcasts an ultimatum to the Cloud: the battleship will begin destroying random planets with "cosmic bombs" until one the worlds of the Fifty Suns unmasks itself. The battleship's thirty sub-captains vote to override her authority and return to the Milky Way, but she forces a plebiscite of the crew, buying herself additional time. Maltby hijacks a Fifty Suns warship by hypnotizing its command crew and travels to a secret planet of the Mixed Men, where he succeeds in placing Hunston under arrest. Upon leaving, his ship is coincidentally captured by the Star Cluster, but Maltby is able to use his hypnotic powers to subvert some of the Imperial crew and escape, taking advantage of a brief opportunity to confront Laurr (from whom he is able to conceal his identity) in person. The Fifty Suns government decides to commit their entire fleet in an attempt to destroy the Earth battleship. Laurr, who had just lost the plebiscite and reluctantly changed course for home, is instead forced into pitched battle, which the vastly superior Star Cluster easily wins, capturing the entire opposing fleet without a shot fired. All the Fifty Suns' astro-navigators (including Maltby) voluntarily commit suicide, but the Grand Captain orders them all resurrected and quickly learns the locations of the Fifty Suns.

"The Storm" opens with the Star Cluster having landed on Kaider III, a different outer world of the Fifty Suns (in the original 1943 version, having discovered the world by pure chance.) It (re)introduces Peter Maltby, who is assigned by his capitulated world to guide the Star Cluster to the capital world of the Fifty Suns, though his secret actual mission is actually to destroy it by steering it at full speed into one of the matter/antimatter storms. Grand Captain Laurr takes a personal interest in Maltby; with the aid of the ship's psychologist, Lieutenant Neslor, she analyzes his mind, discovers he is lying, and - a moment too late - issues an emergency deceleration order. The Star Cluster crashes into a storm and shatters into thousands of individual survival modules, with the one containing the captain and Maltby landing on an uncivilized planet, where they are stuck for a while until the reconstituted Star Cluster returns to pick them up. Before the shipwreck, Maltby had been psychologically conditioned to love the Grand Captain in an attempt to get him to talk, and during their time stranded together she comes to be deeply impressed by him and decides to marry him.

"The Mixed Men" begins with the Star Cluster en route to Cassidor VII, the capital world of the Fifty Suns, where Lady Laurr will accept the capitulation of the Magellanic government. Maltby is secretly contacted by Hunston, and learns that the Mixed Men - a tiny, discriminated-against minority among the Dellian and non-Dellian population - have decided to stage a coup, as they wish to enhance their status within the Fifty Suns before the Empire formally annexes the Lesser Magellanic Cloud, freezing all existing social arrangements in place at the moment of annexation. Lady Laurr intercepts the call and, trusting Maltby's judgement, lets him disembark, but also (out of a sense of duty) has herself psychologically conditioned out of love with him. Maltby visits the Mixed Men's hidden stronghold and finds them sharply divided; upon his return to the Fifty Suns world of Atmion, he learns that Hunston's coup has succeeded, that his party has decided on a policy of armed resistance to the Empire, and - finally - that they have managed to (by subterfuge) capture the Star Cluster. Maltby resolves to rescue his wife, but when he faces Hunston in person on Cassidor, he learns he has been deceived: the Mixed Men have not captured the Star Cluster, but they have inexplicably managed to steal a different highly-advanced battleship from an Imperial shipyard, which they plan to use to destroy the Star Cluster before launching a suicide run against Earth itself. Maltby overpowers Hunston and takes control of the stolen battleship, ending the crisis. In a brief epilogue, the council of captains holds a hearing and rules that Lady Laurr's conditioning must be reverted and her pre-existing love for her husband restored.

"Is it True?" is a chapter-length expansion of the preceding epilogue; it describes all three groups of the Fifty Suns coming to terms with the offer of freedom and equality made by Earth. During the subsequent legal proceedings, Lady Laurr pleads with Maltby not to have the conditioning that makes her dislike him removed. Maltby replies that he is only seeking the undoing of an artificially-imposed mental state, after which she will be free to choose whether to stay married to him or not; however, he is still troubled by her visible unhappiness. Once the council rules for Maltby, he privately points out to Lady Laurr that she could have had their marriage annulled at any time by virtue of infertility, as Mixed Men cannot (without medical intervention) procreate with normal humans; he suggests that the fact she did not do so can only mean that she subconsciously still wants to share her life with him. He petitions the court to discard the ruling and instead grant him 48 hours alone with Laurr on the uncharted world on which she originally fell in love with him, afterwards letting her choose whether to keep her conditioning or not.

== Novel ==
Van Vogt did not need to make substantial changes in combining the original three stories into a single novel-length volume in 1952, as they had already been written as a continuous narrative. He did, however, add significantly more material than it was his practice with his later fixups: seven new chapters (later published separately as the novella "Lost: Fifty Suns") were interpolated between "Concealment" and "The Storm," introducing Maltby (whose rank was increased to captain) much earlier and providing a significant amount of backstory regarding the origin of the Dellian "robots." (This also necessitated a rewrite of the beginning of "The Storm.") Other changes introduced in the novel version included the capabilities of the Mixed Men, which were upgraded from hypnotism to actual telepathy and mind control; the population of the Fifty Suns was also reduced from thirty to sixteen billion, and (perhaps most momentously) the setting was moved from the Lesser to the Greater Magellanic Cloud.

== Reception ==
The novel was negatively received, with a 1952 reviewer for the New York Times calling it a "bad parody" of science fiction and high adventure. P. Schuyler Miller in Astounding Science Fiction (1952) found the novel to be "distinctly minor van Vogt" and that the protagonist "isn't very convincing." Author Bob Shaw later cited that one of the stories in the novel sparked his interest in the science fiction genre, stating that the "reading of that first story changed the entire course of my life".

The short story "The Mixed Men" (the fourth of five comprising the book), originally published in Astounding SF in 1945, was nominated for a Retro-Hugo Award in 1996.
