= A Can of Paint =

- Short story by A. E. van Vogt
- Cover of Astounding, September 1944
- Country: United States
- Language: English
- Genre: Science fiction

Publication
- Published in: Astounding SF
- Publication type: Periodical
- Media type: Magazine, paperback
- Publication date: September 1944

"A Can of Paint" is a science fiction short story by Canadian-American writer A. E. van Vogt, originally published in Astounding in 1944. It is a light-hearted look at the first crewed mission to Venus, a "science puzzle" or "problem story" that requires the protagonist to think his way out of a thorny situation. Included in several anthologies, it was also made into a short film in 2004.

== Plot ==
The protagonist lands on Venus, the first man to successfully make the journey without falling into the Sun. (Note: Which is actually almost impossible, as Knight is quick to point out.) Exiting the ship to begin exploring, he notices a cube-like object with a handle on it just outside the door. He picks it up and it speaks to him through mind telepathy. "I contain paint..." is all he manages to hear before a small amount squirts out onto his shirt and he drops the cube. The paint glows and has all the colors of a rainbow.

He soon notices that the paint is spreading, and when he removes his shirt it jumps onto his skin. When he attempts to rub it off, it flows back on. He then attempts to use various chemicals to remove it, using every solvent he can find and even some of his precious rocket fuel. None of these work, so he tries a screw-top container which he uses to scoop it off, locking it within so it cannot flow back. After filling part of a bucket, he notices that there is no less paint on him than before – it appears to be self-repairing.

He also notices that he is growing extremely hot, as it is also a powerful insulator. He is bemused by the fact that this paint appears to be perfect; it comes in all colors, applies itself, repairs itself, and insulates as well. Unfortunately that insulation quality will kill him due to overheating, long before the equally worrying possibility of it covering his body completely.

Thinking about the problem, he realizes that such a perfect paint had to be manufactured by an advanced technology. He turns on his radio and is quickly contacted by the Venusians. They explain that their bodies are so hideous that they are afraid the sight of them will drive humans mad. They have developed the can of paint with human telepathy at great expense as a sort of IQ test, and that if he lives through the test and is also able to look at them, any following visitor with his IQ or better will be allowed in. After apologizing for all the bother, they disconnect.

Careful not to lift the cube again, he places his hand on the handle and it begins "I contain 2/3rds paint... " and then goes on to read out a complete list of ingredients and application instructions. The primary ingredient is liquid light, and the instructions say it can be easily removed by applying darkness paste. Initially finding this amusing because he does not know where the hardware store is, he suddenly realizes he has a solution.

The action continues with him on his way back to Earth, talking on the radio to another ship making the journey. He explains that he lined his fuel tank with solar cells, capturing the light given off from the paint while blocking any light from outside falling on it. It eventually ran out of energy and fell off as a powder. He mentions that he is returning with his ship completely filled with cans of this indestructible, self-applying, insulating perfect paint, from which he hopes to make his fortune.

== Publication ==
The story was first published in Astounding in September 1944, at the height of van Vogt's short-story efforts. It was included in Destination: Universe! in 1952, and in Transfinite: The Essential A.E. van Vogt in 2003. Although it is not as well known as van Vogt's stories like "Far Centaurus", it is widely commented on in off-topic references.

Damon Knight's dismissive review of van Vogt's works singles out the story as one to be ridiculed. He notes:

The hero's problem in "A Can of Paint" – how to get the perfect paint off his body before it kills him – is solved when he discovers that the "Liquid Light" in it is "absorbed" by a bank of "photo-converter cells" which he happens to have on hand; that is to say, that the doshes are distimmed by the Gostack...

The complaint is ironic, given that solar cells were invented less than a decade later, and their first use was for spacecraft. They remain a common fixture of practically every spacecraft to this day.

== Movie ==
The story was adapted to the screen by Winston Engle, and filmed by director Robi Michael in 2004. The story remains very similar to the original, although the setting is moved from Venus to a derelict spaceship found in deep space. The protagonist, Kilgour (played by Aaron Robson) speaks only to his ship's computer (voiced by Jean Franzblau), but the action remains otherwise faithful to the original.

== Sources ==
- Knight, Damon (1956). In Search of Wonder. Advent.
