= Quest for the Future =

1970 science fiction novel by A. E. van Vogt

- First edition
- Author: A. E. van Vogt
- Cover artist: John Schoenherr
- Language: English
- Genre: Science fiction
- Publisher: Ace Books
- Publication date: 1970
- Publication place: United States
- Pages: 253
- OCLC: 29175908

Quest for the Future is a science fiction novel by Canadian-American writer A. E. van Vogt. It was first published by Ace Books in 1970.

A schoolteacher from the 20th century becomes involved in the activities of a group of time travelers.

== Components ==
The author based the novel on three of his earlier stories, a procedure known as a fix-up. These stories, all first published in Astounding Science Fiction, are:

- "Film Library" (a novelette first published in July 1946). A movie projector shows scenes that seem to be from the future, including strange inventions and scenes on the planet Venus. A schoolteacher who rents the films investigates how the intended films were mysteriously replaced.
- "The Search", (a novelette first published in January 1943). A traveling salesman, after waking in hospital unable to remember what happened to him in the previous two weeks, goes back to the places he visited in order to reconstruct the events. Some of the people he meets are time travelers.
- "Far Centaurus", (a short story first published in January 1944). A spaceship travels to Alpha Centauri, a journey taking 500 years; it is a sleeper ship, the crew being in hibernation with brief periods awake. On arriving, they find an advanced civilization from Earth, who can travel there in three hours using faster-than-light machines, invented during the crew's long journey.

== Summary ==
The protagonist of the novel is Peter Caxton, a physics teacher who, as in the story "Film Library", rents films for his school. He takes the movie projector, that seems to be changing the intended films into films from the future, home for investigation.

Caxton, then waking in hospital, is the amnesiac traveling salesman from the story "The Search"; he goes back over his sales territory to discover what happened. He meets Selanie, who is selling gadgets from the future, and her father Claudan Johns; they are time travelers, and he discovers their motor home that contains the gadgets.

He is transported into the year 2083 by a handshake from a rival time traveler. There he sees inventions from the films he rented, and he explores an enormous building; after sleeping he wakes up by an older version of Selanie, to whom he seems to be married. He meets Price, who explains that the building is the Palace of Immortality, which Claudan Johns discovered, and which is used for time travel; the time travelers are known as Possessors. A handshake from Price sends Caxton back to his original time.

In an attempt to return to 2083, he joins an expedition to travel to nearby star Alpha Centauri, as in the story "Far Centaurus". His intention is to turn the spaceship round during a waking interval between periods of hibernation, and so return to Earth at the right time; but when he wakes after 50 years, he finds it is not possible. Arriving at Alpha Centauri, the crew are received by the advanced civilization from Earth that can make the journey in three hours, and have long been expecting them. They are shown round Alpha Centauri, and around Earth. Caxton, still interested in his old sales territory, there meets Kameel Bustaman; he is a Possessor, and sends Caxton back to the 20th century.

Possessors Johns and Bustaman, and Possessor Daniel Magoelson who becomes important later, are trying to increase their ability to travel through time, as they learn to deal with probability worlds and time foldbacks. Caxton, caught up in this activity, makes further time shifts, and the story becomes increasingly complex. There is an interval where Caxton travels with Selanie and Johns in their motor home, in the North America of 1650, during which Johns discusses time travel.

The movie projector's special qualities were created by Johns and Magoelson, in an attempt to create an imbalance in a time foldback; the attempt was unexpectedly affected by the presence of Bustaman watching the film, who at that time was not aware he was a Possessor, and wrecked by Caxton's dismantling of the projector.

During the time traveling, two versions of Caxton and of Selanie are created. At the end, these versions are merged, and Selanie, resolving their relationship, says, "I can't marry you because the me that I merged with, is already married to you, remember?"
