= The Search (short story) =

- Short story by A. E. van Vogt
- Country: United States
- Language: English
- Genre: Science fiction

Publication
- Published in: Astounding SF
- Publication type: Periodical
- Media type: Magazine, Paperback, Graphic novel
- Publication date: January 1943

"The Search" is a science fiction short story by Canadian-American writer A. E. van Vogt, originally published in Astounding in January 1943. The story involves time travel, and is told in a non-linear fashion, with heavy use of flashbacks and multiple plot twists.

== Plot summary ==
Drake, a travelling salesmen for the Quik-Rite pen company, awakens in a hospital with no memory of the previous two weeks. He is visited by his boss, who tells him that he had disappeared in the middle of a business trip to the town of Inchney. In an attempt to jog his memory, Drake sets out to recreate the journey.

At a train station, he is recognized by another traveler, Bill Kellie, who recounts their meeting on the train two weeks ago. Drake had mentioned that his merchandise included fountain pens, prompting Kellie to produce a pen he had recently purchased from a girl named Selanie, who would often board the train at the small hamlet of Piffer's Road (coincidentally, Drake's birthplace) to sell random household items of surprisingly advanced manufacture. Despite having only cost a dollar, the pen is capable of condensing ink from the atmosphere in any desired color. An older man seated nearby had shown an interest in the pen and was given it to examine, but it broke instantly; the man gave Kellie a dollar in recompense. Soon after, the train had stopped at Piffer's Road and was boarded by Selanie, this time selling folding cups capable of precipitating either water or a selection of refreshing drinks from the atmosphere. Drake had told her of the broken pen; the news startled her badly, and when the older man was pointed out to her, she fled the train in terror. Drake and Kellie had angrily turned on the man, but found themselves inexplicably and wordlessly overawed by him. Drake had then disembarked to follow the girl, concluding Kellie's recollection.

In the present, Drake returns to Piffer's Road and talks to some locals; they tell him he had been observed entering the motorhome belonging to Selanie and her father, supposedly an inventor and the source of the advanced products. Drake had found the motorhome empty and had left, but was then seen returning and entering it, whereupon it had abruptly disappeared. The following day, the older man had been seen in town; overnight, all the items Selanie had sold had gone missing, with a dollar bill left behind for each one. Drake visits the location of the motorhome, but it is no longer there. As the trail appears cold, he returns to Inchney, where he overhears someone breaking an object and offering to pay a dollar for it. It is the older man; Drake confronts him and is again overwhelmed by a kind of mesmeric power, blacking out.

He awakens in an enormous empty building filled with offices and apartments, filled with unearthly beauty and advanced technology. Drake spends a day exploring the building, which appears to have no foundation and is suspended in a void filled with a luminous white mist. He discovers written records which identify this as the "Palace of Immortality" and detail the activities of its inhabitants, the Possessors - a group of humans capable of time travel, whose purpose seems to be the correcting of wrongs on both an individual and societal level with the goal of guiding history in a more humane direction. Felling hungry, Drake enters an apartment, eats, sleeps, and awakens next to a woman who resembles an older version of Selanie; she casually addresses him as her husband and asks him if will be heading to Earth that day. Utterly confused, Drake leaves the apartment and finds the palace bustling with activity; he is met by a man named Price, who gives him a metallic glove and (finally) some answers.

The Possessors are a group of about three thousand people that emerged due to an unknown environmental catalyst in the area around Piffer's Road between the twentieth and twenty-fifth centuries; they are so-called because they possess the natural ability to travel through time (though they can use technological enhancements to move other people and vehicles as well.) The Possessors have built the Palace of Immortality in an "eddy in time," in which they age backwards; they use it as a base for their interventions into normal time, though they do not venture earlier than the 25th century. Selanie's father is himself a Possessor, but a dissident who opposes the group on ideological grounds; he had been introducing advanced technology in the 1940s with the goal of changing environment variables to prevent the original emergence of the Possessors. Drake - himself one of the earliest-born Possessors - had been selected to sabotage his plan. Due to the dissident's countermeasures, he needed to be recruited from a point in his personal timeline before he was capable of using his time-traveling ability. The Possessors had abducted him on the way back to Piffer's Road after he had found the motorhome empty, wiped his memory, and dropped him off in a hospital. Now, they propose to send Drake back to the same point in time, so he may conceal himself in the motorhome until it is underway, then use the glove to neutralize Selanie's fathers' Possessor powers, ending the threat and stranding the trio for about a year in the 17th century (which will give Drake and Selanie time to develop the mutual affection that will lead to their eventual marriage.)

The story ends with Selanie watching Drake leave the Palace to complete his mission.

== Versions ==
The story was included in a number of Van Vogt short story collections, including his first, 1952's Destination: Universe! Recently, it has appeared in the 2003 collection Transfinite: The Essential A. E. van Vogt.

The Search was incorporated into one of Van Vogt's late-career fix-up novels, Quest for the Future (1970), in which it was combined with "Film Library" (1946) and "Far Centaurus" (1944). The plot remains similar to the original, but the names were changed to identify Drake and Selanie with the protagonists of the overarching story. The result was not considered to be a success; the low quality of these fix-ups has been suggested as one of the reasons for van Vogt's decline in popularity.

== Sources ==
- "The Novels of A. E. van Vogt". A. E. van Vogt.
