= Rule =

Rule or ruling may refer to:

== Human activity ==
- Norm (philosophy), a kind of sentence or a reason to act, feel or believe
- Rule of man and rule of law - the exercise of political or personal control by someone with authority or power
- Business rule, a rule pertaining to the structure or behavior internal to a business
- School rule, a rule that is part of school discipline
- Sport rule, a rule that defines how a sport is played
- Game rule, a rule that defines how a game is played
- Morality, a rule or element of a moral code for guiding choices in human behavior
- Social norm, explicit or implicit rules used within society or by a group
- Rule of thumb, a principle with broad application that is not intended to be strictly accurate or reliable for every situation
- Unspoken rule, an assumed rule of human behavior that is not voiced or written down

== Science ==
- Ruler or "rule"; a distance measuring device
- Slide rule, a mechanical analog computer
- Rule of inference or transformation rule, a term in logic for a function which takes premises and returns a conclusion
- Phrase structure rule or rewrite rule, used in some theories of linguistics
- "Rule X" elementary cellular automaton, where X is a number between 0-255 characterizing a specific model (e.g. Rule 110)
- Phonological rule

== Law and government ==
- Advance tax ruling, a tool for conforming taxation arrangements
- Court order, a decision by a court
- Government
- In rulemaking by the federal government of the United States, a regulation mandated by Congress, but written or expanded upon by the executive branch
- Law, which may informally be called a "rule"
- Military rule, governance by a military body
- Monastic rule, a collection of precepts that guides the life of monks or nuns in a religious order
- Procedural law, a ruleset governing the application of laws to cases
- Rule of law, government based not on arbitrary decisions of officials but on laws

== Geography ==
- Rule, Arkansas
- Rule, Texas

== Literature ==
- The Rules, bestselling self-help book
- Rules (novel), 2007 Newbery Honor book by Cynthia Lord
- "The Rulers", a science fiction short story by A. E. van Vogt

== Music ==
- Ja Rule (born 1976), hip hop artist

=== Albums ===
- R.U.L.E., by Ja Rule, 2004
- Rule, by Anna Tsuchiya, 2010
- Rules (The Whitest Boy Alive album), 2009
- Rules (Alex G album), 2012
- Rules, by First Blood, 2017
- Rules!, by Manila Luzon, 2019

=== Songs ===
- "Rule" (Nas song), 2001
- "Rule"/"Sparkle", a double A-side by Ayumi Hamasaki, 2009
- "Rule", by X Ambassadors from Orion, 2019
- "Rules" (Doja Cat song), 2019
- "Rules" (KMFDM song), 1996
- "Rules", by Shakira from Laundry Service, 2001
- "Rules", by 6lack from Free 6lack, 2016
- "The Rules", by XO-IQ, featured in the television series Make It Pop

== Other uses ==
- Rule (surname)
- The Rule (film), a 2014 American documentary
- Ruler (film), a 2019 India Telugu-language film
- Pushpa: The Rule, a 2024 Indian period action film
- Rules: Pyaar Ka Superhit Formula, a 2003 Bollywood film
- rule: a snippet of code which can perform email filtering
- Rule (horse) (born 2007), American racehorse
- Rules (restaurant), upscale English restaurant in London
- Rules!, a 2014 iOS video game
- "Rule #1" (Batwoman)
- Royal University of Law and Economics, a university in Cambodia

== See also ==
- Debate (parliamentary procedure) for rules governing discussion on the merits of a pending question.
