= Ruler (disambiguation) =

A ruler is a device used to measure distances or draw straight lines.

Ruler may also refer to:

- A person who wields significant or total political power
- Ruler (film), a 2019 Indian Telugu-language action film
- Ruler (gamer), stage name of League of Legends player Park Jae-hyuk
- Ruler (horse), a racehorse
- Golomb ruler, comprises a series of marks such that no two pairs of marks are the same distance apart
- Slide rule, a mechanical analog computer
- "Ruler", a song by Marnie Stern from This Is It and I Am It and You Are It and So Is That and He Is It and She Is It and It Is It and That Is That
- Ruler, a character from the sixth season of Battle for Dream Island, an animated web series

== See also ==
- Rule (disambiguation)
