= Sleeper ship =

Hypothetical type of crewed starship

A sleeper ship is a hypothetical type of crewed spacecraft, or starship in which most or all of the crew spend the journey in some form of hibernation or suspended animation. The only known technology that allows long-term suspended animation of humans is the freezing of early-stage human embryos through embryo cryopreservation, which is behind the concept of embryo space colonization.

== Description ==
The most common role of sleeper ships in fiction is for interstellar or intergalactic travel, usually at sub-light speed. Travel times for such journeys could reach into the hundreds or thousands of years, making some form of life extension, such as suspended animation, necessary for the original crew to live to see their destination. Suspended animation is also required on ships that cannot be used as generation ships.

Freezing the astronauts would probably involve whole-body vitrification and would, most likely, be frozen at 145 kelvins to reduce the risk of fracturing.

Suspended animation can also be useful to reduce the consumption of life support system resources by crew members who are not needed during the trip, or by an author as a plot device, and for this reason, sleeper ships sometimes also appear in contexts involving travel within the Solar System or any other system of planets orbiting one star.

== Examples in fiction ==
There are numerous examples of sleeper ships in science fiction literature and films. Some of the best-known examples are:

- "Far Centaurus", published in Destination: Universe! by AE van Vogt
- The interplanetary sleeper ship USSC Discovery One is one of the main subjects of the whole Space Odyssey franchise. As it is told in 2001: A Space Odyssey, six crew members are on the spacecraft: Commander "Dave" Bowman and Frank Poole were de-hibernated before the others; Victor Kaminsky, Jack Kimball and Charles Hunter were killed by the sixth member: the psychopathic artificial intelligence HAL 9000.
- Pandorum
- The TV series Lost in Space used a sleeper ship, the Jupiter II, intended to hold the crew for the five-and-a-half-year journey to Alpha Centauri. Dr. Smith, a saboteur and accidental stowaway, is forced to revive the crew to save the ship from meteors.
- The film Lost in Space in which the suspended animation system fails, bringing the crew of Jupiter 2 out of sleep prematurely.
- Nostromo – The sleeper/cargo ship in the film Alien.
- Sulaco – The sleeper/war ship in the film Aliens.
- The Hunter-Gratzner in the film Pitch Black transports a number of its passengers in cryostasis.
- Planet of the Apes
- Avatar
- Stargate SG-1 – A ship is found with its crew in cryostasis.
- Stargate Universe – The crew of the Destiny enter stasis in order to sleep during a potentially millennia-long trip.
- Prometheus
- SS Botany Bay, a sleeper ship from the Star Trek: The Original Series episode "Space Seed" (it is also mentioned in Star Trek II: The Wrath of Khan and Star Trek Into Darkness), transporting a crew including Khan Noonien Singh. One (Star Trek: Voyager) illustrates a similar technique.
- Called a "sail-ship" by Cordwainer Smith in Think Blue, Count Two
- Cargo
- New Mayflower and Ark from Frederik Pohl's novel The World at the End of Time
- After Earth
- Homeworld
- Freelancer – Five sleeper ships built by the Alliance: the Bretonia, the Rheinland, the Hispania, the Kusari and the Liberty. Of these five, all but the Hispania go on to found different star systems, each named after them: the Hispania can be found in the game as an abandoned derelict, the descendants of its passengers having become the "Outcast" and "Corsair" pirate factions.
- The space station-starship hybrid Endurance from Interstellar is used by NASA astronauts to travel through a wormhole to another galaxy in order to find a new planet for humanity or bomb the planet with human embryos.
- Event Horizon – The vessel Lewis and Clark is dispatched to find what happened to the ship Event Horizon. The Crew is put in hibernation.
- In the official trailer of the video game Civilization: Beyond Earth, a sleeper ship was seen sending humans from Earth to an alien planet.
- Mass Effect Andromeda – Representatives of the human race, in addition to that of other Milky Way Galaxy races, travel to the Andromeda Galaxy aboard a series of arks, with the aim of colonizing a series of new homeworlds. The travel time is only 600 years due to the discovery of a form of faster-than-light travel that cuts down the time to traverse the 2.5 million light years between galaxies (by comparison, it is mentioned in the game that a cargo vessel, also sent in the direction of Andromeda, will not arrive for more than two million years.)
- Halo
- Hyperion, a novel by Dan Simmons. The Seed Ships are a type of slower than light travel that put the passengers into a fugue-like state for the length of the trip.
- Heaven's Vault
- Passengers – It features the sleeper ship Avalon. The suspended animation system, which keeps 5,000 passengers in hibernation on board the Avalon during its 120-year trip to the planet Homestead II, fails as a result of asteroid collisions causing a mechanical engineer to be awoken prematurely.
- Don't Look Up – The US president and some of her inner circle escape an extinction event where a large comet hits the Earth.

== See also ==
- Embryo space colonization
- Generation ship
- Interstellar ark
- Seedship
- Torpor Inducing Transfer Habitat For Human Stasis To Mars
