= Destination: Universe! =

Book by A.E. van Vogt

- Dust-jacket from the first edition
- Author: A. E. van Vogt
- Cover artist: Boris Dolgov
- Language: English
- Genre: Science fiction
- Publisher: Pellegrini & Cudahy
- Publication date: 1952
- Publication place: United States
- Media type: Print (hardback & paperback)
- Pages: xv + 295
- OCLC: 2152944

Destination: Universe! is the second collection of science fiction short stories by Canadian-American writer A. E. van Vogt. It was published in hardcover by Pellegrini & Cudahy in 1952, and repeatedly reprinted in paperback, by three different publishers, over the next 25 years. The first British edition appeared in 1953, followed by several paperback reprints. A French translation, Destination Univers, was issued in 1973 and reprinted six times over the next 25 years. The collection has also been translated into Swedish (1954, as Destination universum), Portuguese (1960, as Rumo ao Universo), and Romanian (1994, as Destinația univers).

== Contents ==
- "Far Centaurus" (Astounding 1944)
- "The Monster" (Astounding 1948)
- "Dormant" (Startling Stories 1948)
- "Enchanted Village" (Other Worlds 1950)
- "A Can of Paint" (Astounding 1944)
- "Defense" (Avon Fantasy Reader 1947)
- "The Rulers" (Astounding 1944)
- "Dear Pen Pal" (The Arkham Sampler 1949)
- "The Sound" (Astounding 1950)
- "The Search" (Astounding 1943)

== Reception ==
P. Schuyler Miller reviewed the collection favorably, singling out "Far Centaurus" as "unforgettable and unforgotten." A 1952 review of Destination: Universe in Galaxy Science Fiction, despite finding fault with the "coldness of [van Vogt's] writing and the woodenness of his characterizations," acknowledged him as "the most superb imaginations of all time," and assessed "Far Centaurus", "The Monster", "The Enchanted Village", "Dear Pen Pal", and "The Search" as "class A stories," while calling "Defense" "very powerful and shocking." "A Can of Paint" was rated "minor", while "Dormant", "The Rulers", and "The Sound" received mixed or negative reviews. Anthony Boucher and J. Francis McComas of The Magazine of Fantasy and Science Fiction said in June 1953 that Destination: Universe! was "best bargain in this month's reprints".
