= Monumental Clock of Pachuca =

- Reloj Monumental de Pachuca
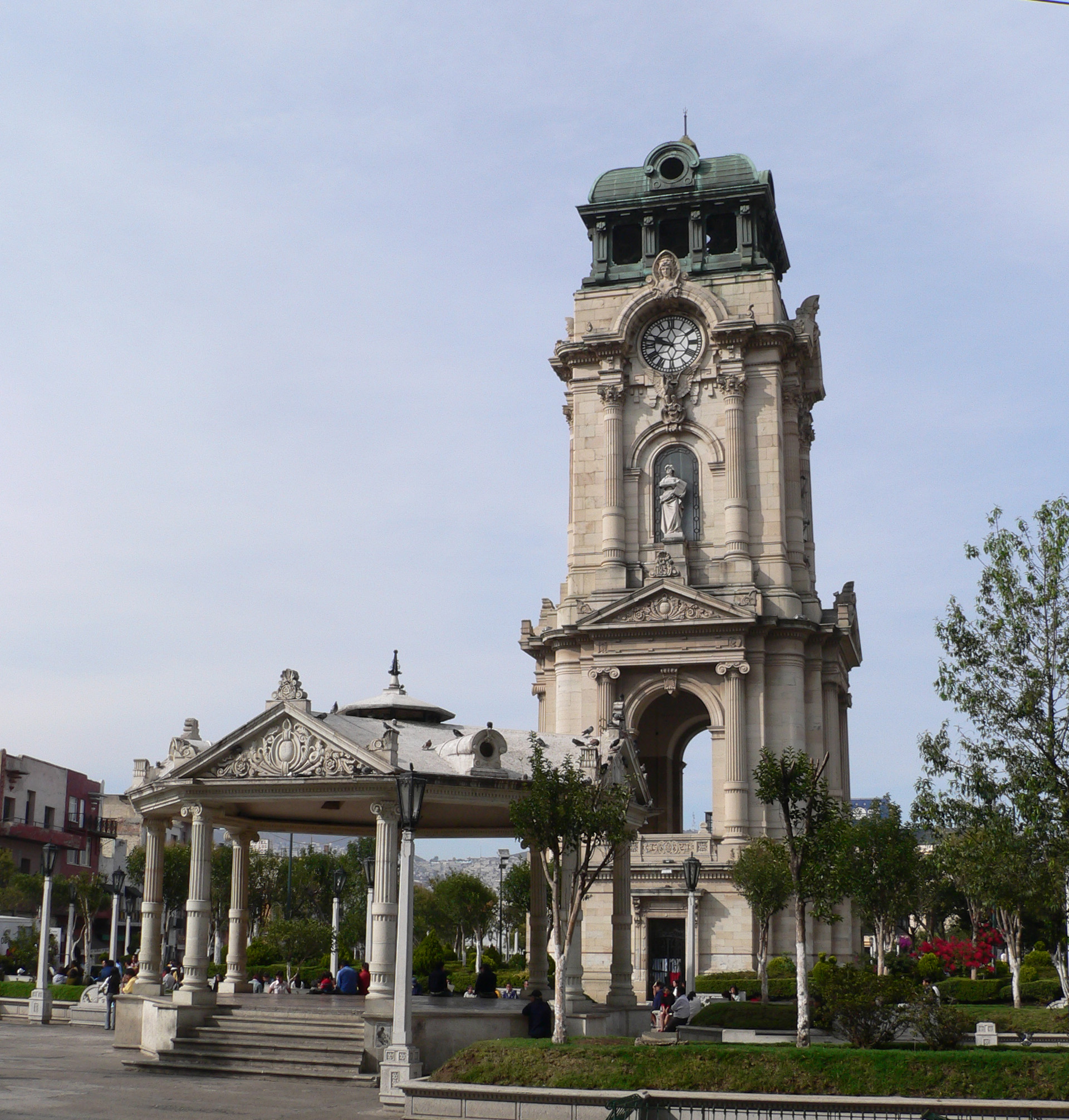
- Interactive map of Monumental Clock of Pachuca
- Location: Pachuca, Mexico
- Coordinates: 20°07′39″N 98°43′55″W
- Designer: Tomás Cordero
- Type: Clock tower
- Material: Cantera
- Height: 40 m
- Beginning date: 1904
- Completion date: 1910
- Opening date: September 15, 1910
- Dedicated to: 100th anniversary of the start of the Mexican War of Independence

Pachuca's Monumental Clock is a clock tower located in the Plaza Independencia in the historic centre of the city of Pachuca, in the state of Hidalgo, Mexico. It was built between 1904 and 1910 to commemorate the centennial of the Mexican War of Independence. Its machinery was made by the Dent enterprise in London. At 40 metres (130 ft) high, the Monumental Clock is the best known symbol of the city.

== History ==
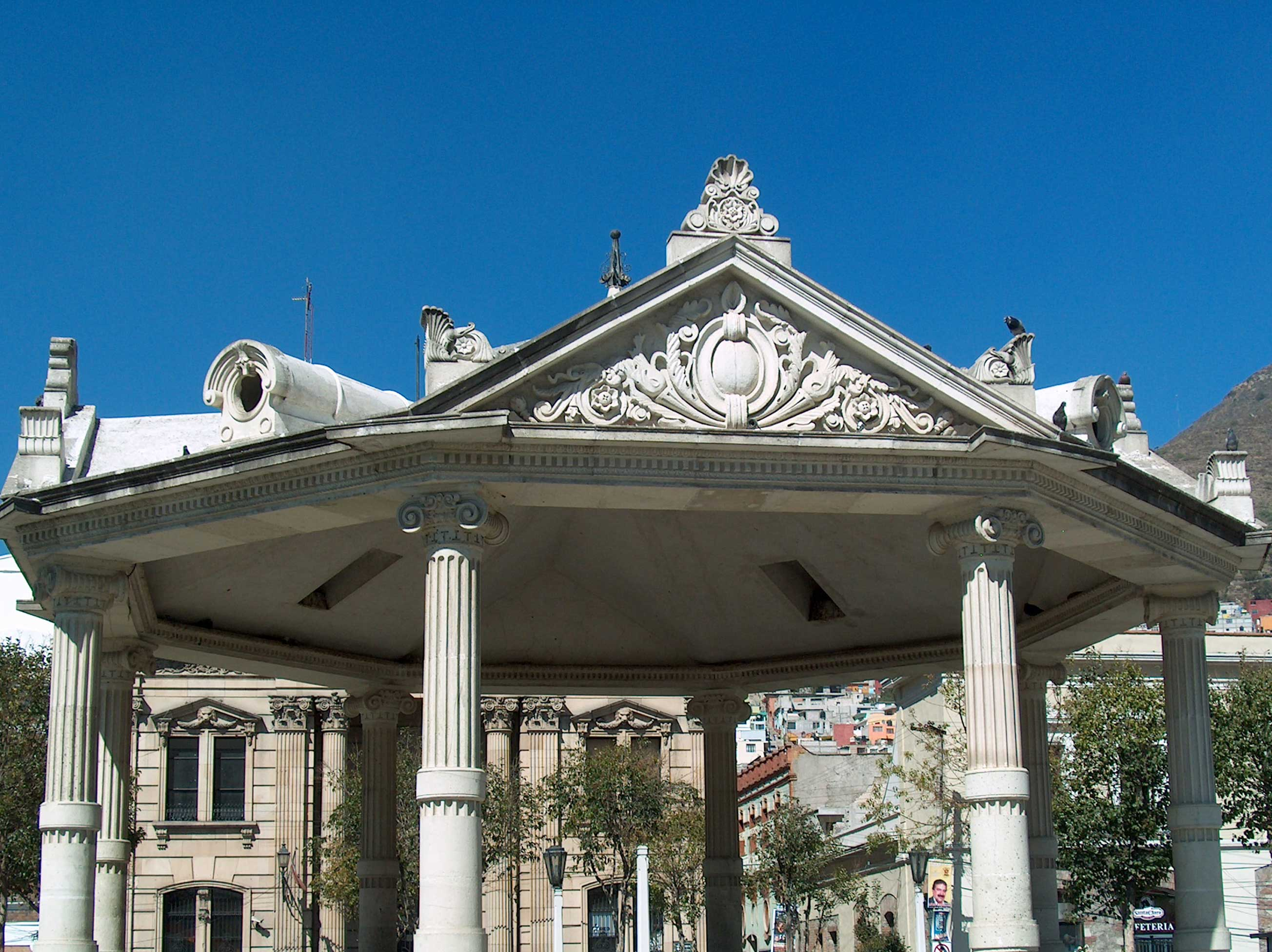
Kiosk in front of the clock

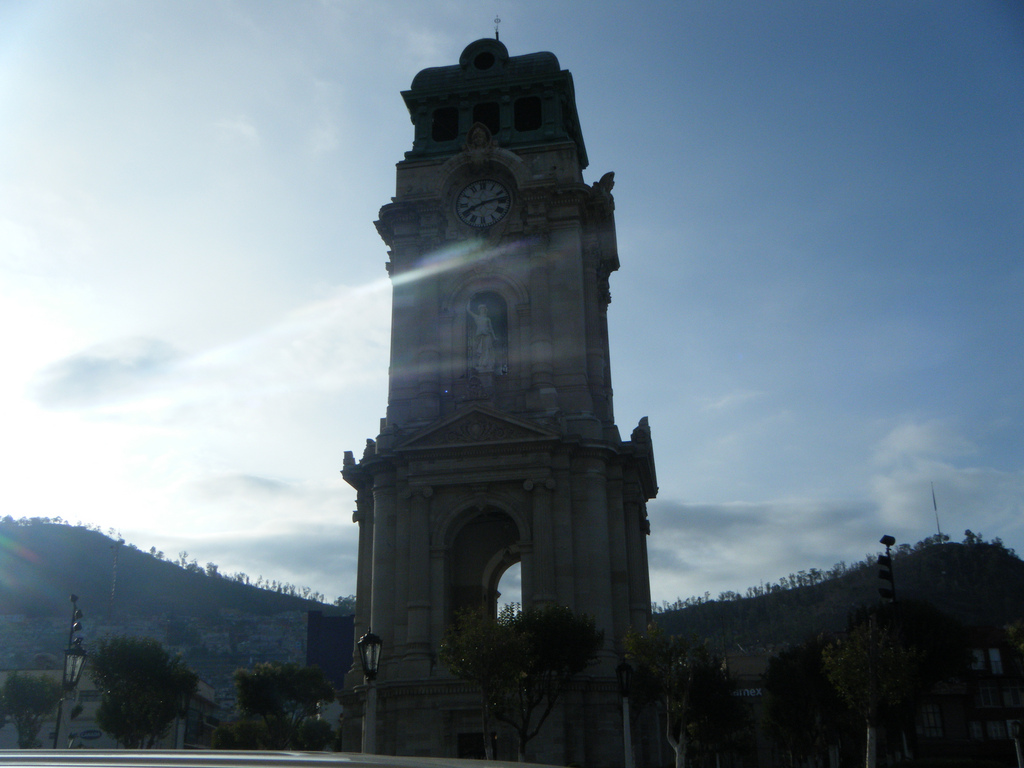
The clock at dawn

=== Background ===
On January 20, 1901, a musical group known as the Banda de Rurales gave its first performance in a wooden bandstand in the Plaza de las Diligencias (now the Plaza Independencia), directed by Candelario Rivas. The band gained popularity in the context of popular glory, with a group of British mining companies proposing that governor Francisco Valenzuela build a majestic tower of concerts, entrepreneurs were led by Alfonso María Brito. The project was approved in 1904, when it began construction, though it was suspended a year later for lack of funds.

In 1906, Governor Pedro L. Rodriguez resumed the project. The clock tower's design was by architect Tomás Cordero, and it was built by engineers Francisco Hernández and Luis Carreón.

=== Construction ===
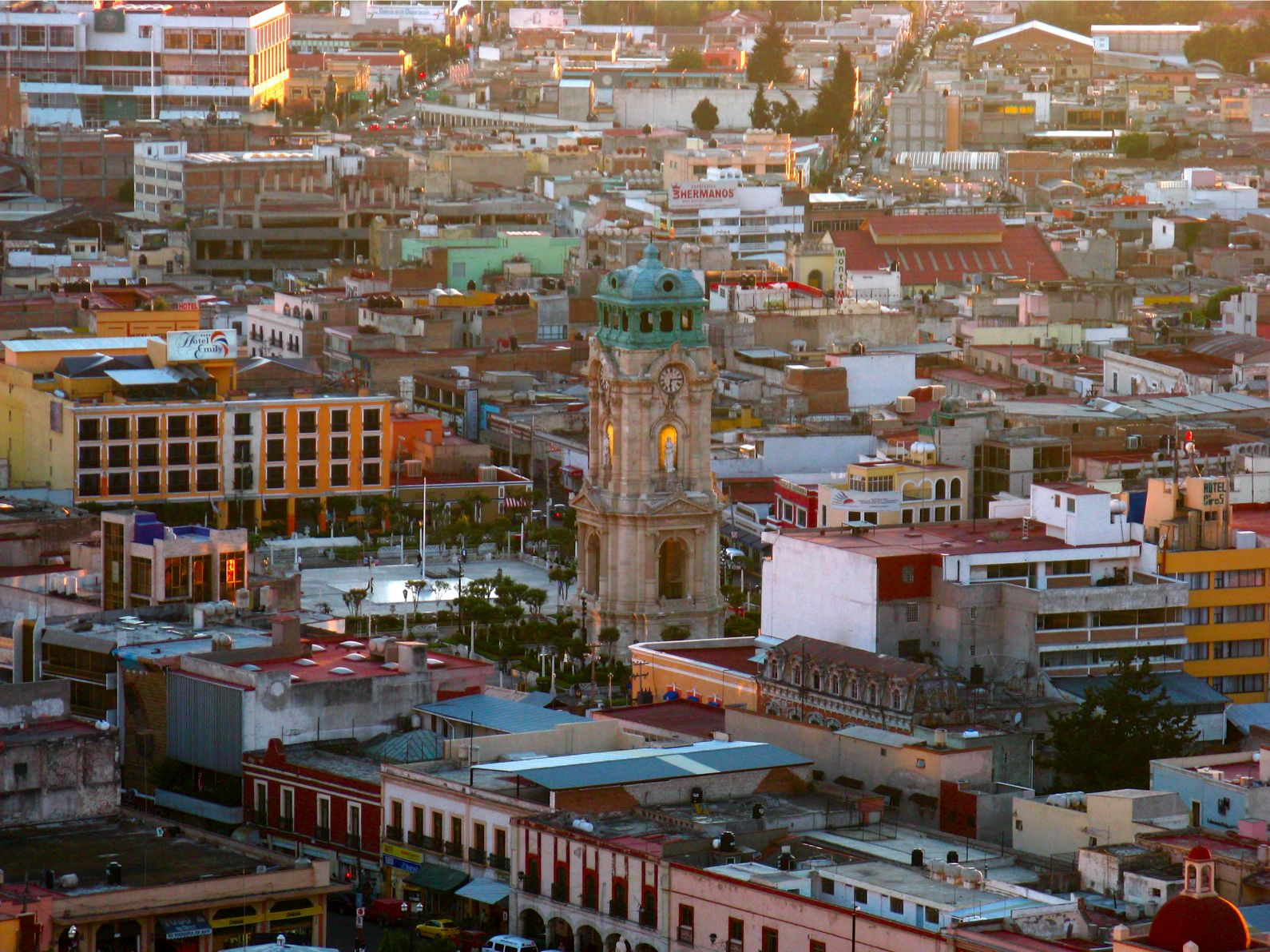
The clock at sunset

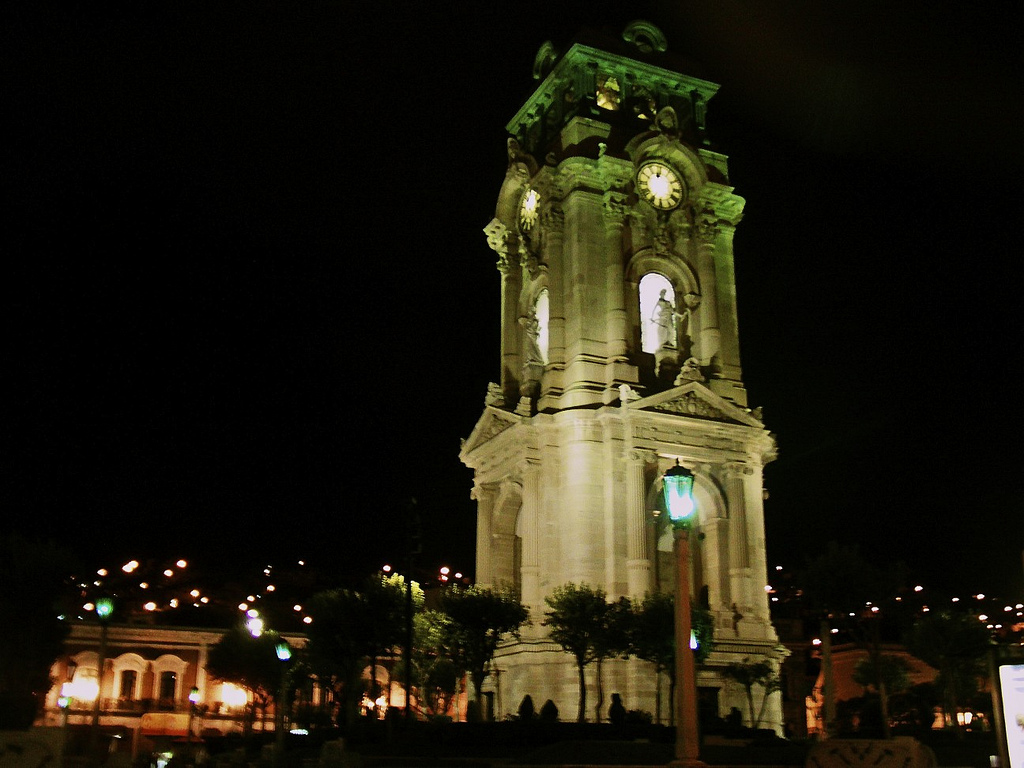
The clock in the night

Francis Rule, a mining magnate originally from Cornwall, provided financing for the clock. Construction began in 1906 with contributions from mining companies established in the region. The total cost amounted to approximately 300,000 pesos oro. The stone came from the quarry of Tezoantla located in the municipality of Mineral del Monte.

The construction process was a tongue- and groove-based treatment technique in which each quarried block is pierced with a cylindrical bore at the top and sculpted into a kind of spike in the lower part, the latter fitting into the drilled hole without limestone use any material on the boards. 35 quarriers worked on the first stage and 29 on the second. Among the latter were Jacinto and Pedro Hernández Baldovino, who were charged with sculpting the acroteria crowning the clock face. For the placement of the carillon and copper dome, was requested to intervene and also alacateros of the mining company of San Rafael.

Jesús Zenil, a collaborator of the minister plenipotentiary of Mexico in Austria-Hungary, purchased the machinery for the clock in England and sent it to Pachuca. He went to the factory founded by Edward John Dent and there discussed the acquisition of the clock and carillon. The machinery arrived in Pachuca years before construction of the tower was completed and was kept first in the Capilla de la Asunción and later in the Casa de Francisco Rule until being installed in the tower. The installation was done by Tomás Zepeda.

The tower was designed with open balconies on which the band could play, but the height meant the show could not be appreciated by the audience. The Banda de Rurales played at the kiosk attached to the tower again and finally helped to commemorate the centennial of Mexican independence from Spain. To complete the monument a sheet of copper manufactured in the Monterrey Iron & Steel Foundry, opened in 1900, was ordered and used to build the dome. The piece was brought by rail and stood before the inauguration.

=== Opening ===
On September 15, 1910, shortly before 8:00 AM, Alberto Dross, a German watchmaker, verified the sound of the bells and the accuracy of the hands of the four dials. At 12:00 PM, Gumersindo Meléndez put the finishing touches on the lighting of the plaza; by about 19:00 the plaza was completely obscured, and at 21:00 the Rurales body arrived and behind them the great brass band.

At 21:15, Governor Ladislao Pedro Rodríguez, accompanied by his wife, Virginia Hernández, and various authorities, made his entry into the plaza where he presided over the ceremony, which began with an overture played by the Banda de Rurales followed by the lawyer Joaquín González giving the official speech, an oratory on the meaning of independence and the effort to build the great tower. This was followed by an interpretation of the band, and by students from the public schools of Pachuca playing the anthem again. The Banda de Rurales executed a musical prelude to a poem by Miss Luz Conde, before finally playing the overture of the Puccini opera Tosca. The program closed with the poet Miguel Bracho reciting one of his poems.

The clock took its first strokes at 23:00 that evening. The governor on the ground floor, to hear the first ringing, pulled the curtain that hid the marble plaque testifying to that opening, then rose to the first plant, of the discovered balconies, where he gave the cry of independence and the Mexican National Anthem.

Mr. Dross had arranged the machinery of the clock so that for fifteen minutes the ringing was constant. It was accompanied by the controlled explosion of dynamite charges triggered by mining companies in the hills surrounding the town, with fireworks continuing after. During the early years, the care of the equipment and operation of the clock was in the charge of Mr. Alberto Dross.

=== Centennial ===
On 15 September 2010, the monument celebrated its 100th anniversary. Commemoration was on par with the celebrations of the bicentennial of Mexican independence that same year. Luis Corrales Vivar, director of the Casa de la Cultura de Pachuca, spoke at a ceremony about the historical and evolutionary portrait of the Monumental Clock, in which the Philharmonic Orchestra of Pachuca also participated. The Centennial flag was displayed at the Elementary School Julián Villagrán, the same national flag used to honor the laying of the foundation stone of the Monumental Clock.

On 25 September 2010 there was a light show and a concert by ranchera singer Pepe Aguilar attended by 10,000 spectators, where a plaque commemorating the centennial was also unveiled. An urban art exhibition and competition, "100 Years, 100 Watches", arranged by the citizens of Pachuca, was held along the Río de las Avenidas.

In 2011 the Monumental Clock was declared a protected area by order of the Pachuca City Council, as published in the Official Gazette of the State of Hidalgo.

== Architecture ==
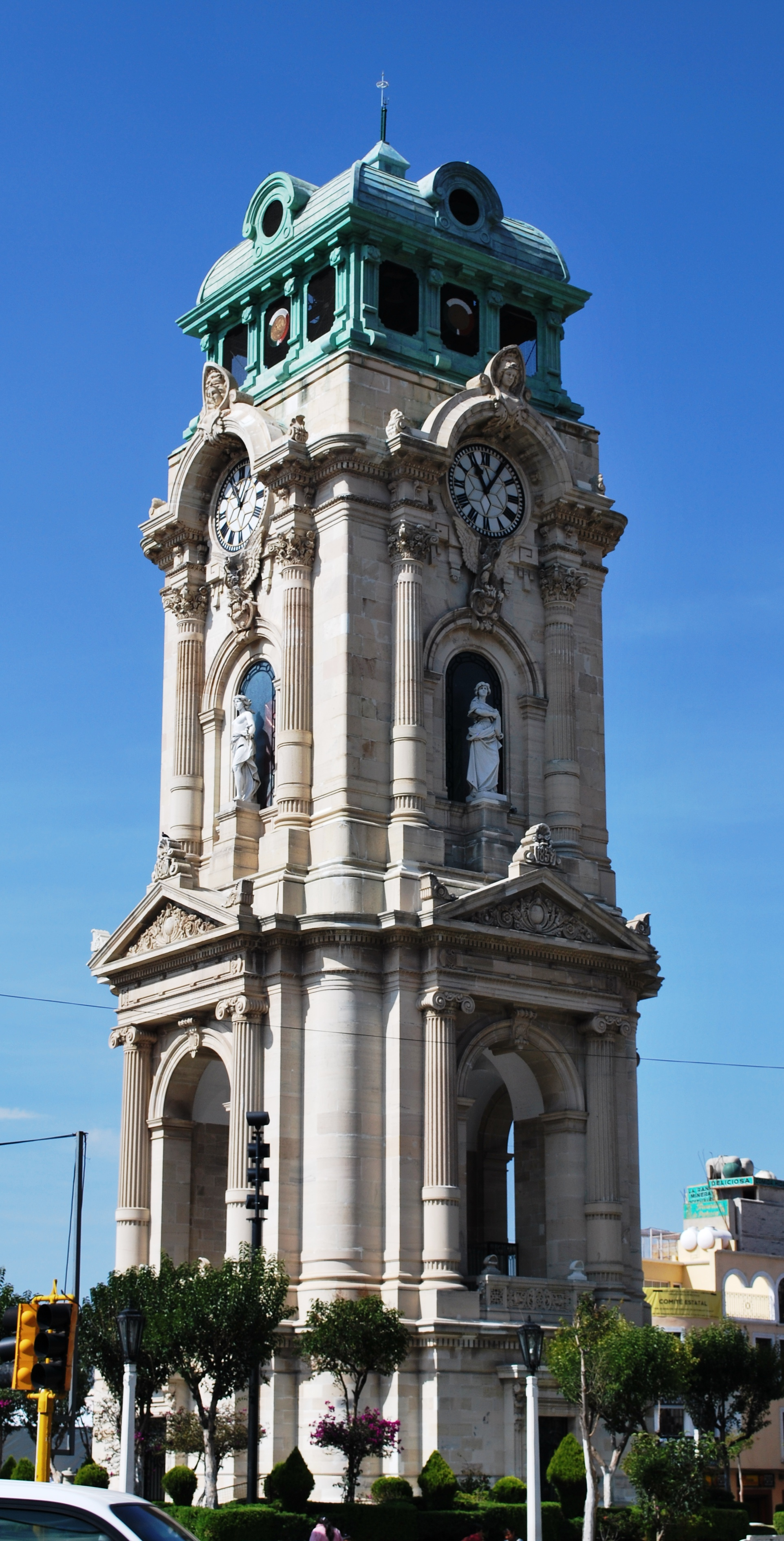
Tower of the Monumental Clock of Pachuca

=== Tower ===
The tower is built of white stone quarry in the neoclassical style. Each of its four faces points to one of the cardinal directions. The tower is composed of four sections or levels:

- The first level, the lower is the smallest and has four doors, one on each side of rectangular vains, which provide access to the building.
- The second level is a frontispiece of Ionic order, which is accessed by a spiral staircase, a space that overlooks the plaza through two separate balconies on each side, through the open arches of which the townspeople could listen to performances by the Banda de Rurales.
- The third level contains columns with Corinthian capitals and houses the clock machinery. It is illuminated by four windows, one on each side, in which are four female statues.
- The fourth level, where the dial is located, each framed by an eagle with spread wings on the bottom and a semicircular cornice topped by an acroterion with the image of time, the whole is surmounted by a dome of copper and wrought iron, manufactured in Monterrey, in which three rectangular openings and one circular opening on each side allow the output of the sound of the bells housed there.

=== Female statue ===
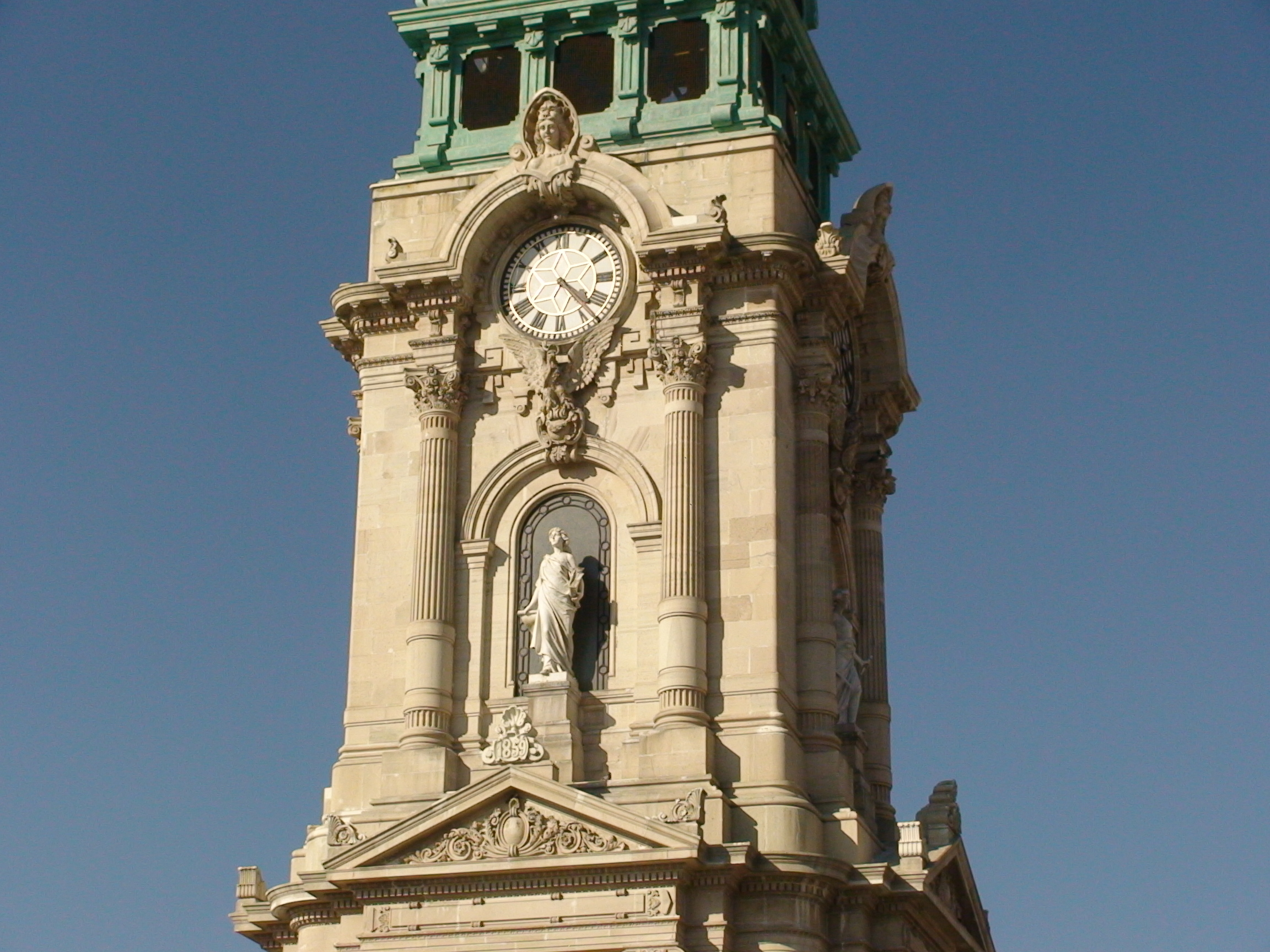
Detail, which shows the statue of the 1859 Law Reform and the cover of the clock, where one can see that the Roman numeral IV is written IIII

At the third level of the tower are in each of the faces, female statues 3m high, carved in Italy with Carrara marble. These represent Mexican historical moments until 1910, being these, 1810 the beginning of the Independence of Mexico 1821 the consummation of the Independence of Mexico, 1857 enactment of the Federal Constitution of the United Mexican States 1859 the Law Reform.

Therefore, the statues representing the Liberty, Independence, Constitution and Reform: All of these dates are related to public rights and constitutional history, point which is reinforced by the image of each sculpture:

- The Independence (1810) is a young naked woman of upper torso with sword and torch in each hand.
- The Freedom (1821) also has the torso without coat, the right hand in up holding the bay laurel of victory, element that also takes by crown on the left wears a broken chain, left leg forward subtly and pleated tunic.
- The Constitution (1857) with grave, deep eyes, wearing a belt at the waist and holding the Magna Carta in his hand, his index finger of his right hand seems to point to the value of holding the left.
- The Reform (1859) in his right hand has a parchment unrolled and in left an open book covered with a robe, and wearing a skirt, it looks like progress because the folds the move of their clothes and his hair is wavy.

=== Clock ===
The clock machinery was made by the Dent company. It is a common belief that the mechanism is identical to that of Big Ben in London, but this is false. The clock in Big Ben was made by Edward John Dent following the designs of Edmund Beckett Denison and George Airy, and is a gigantic piece of machinery weighing five tonnes. The Pachuca clock was made not by Edward Dent directly but by the company he founded, and is many times smaller than Big Ben's machinery and of a different design.

On the clock face the Roman numeral IV is written IIII. Atop the fourth level of the Monumental Clock is a copper dome which houses eight different bells sounding in the key of C major, played every 15 minutes on the hour, hour and quarter, hour and half, and hour and forty-five. At 18:00 each evening the bells sing the National Anthem.

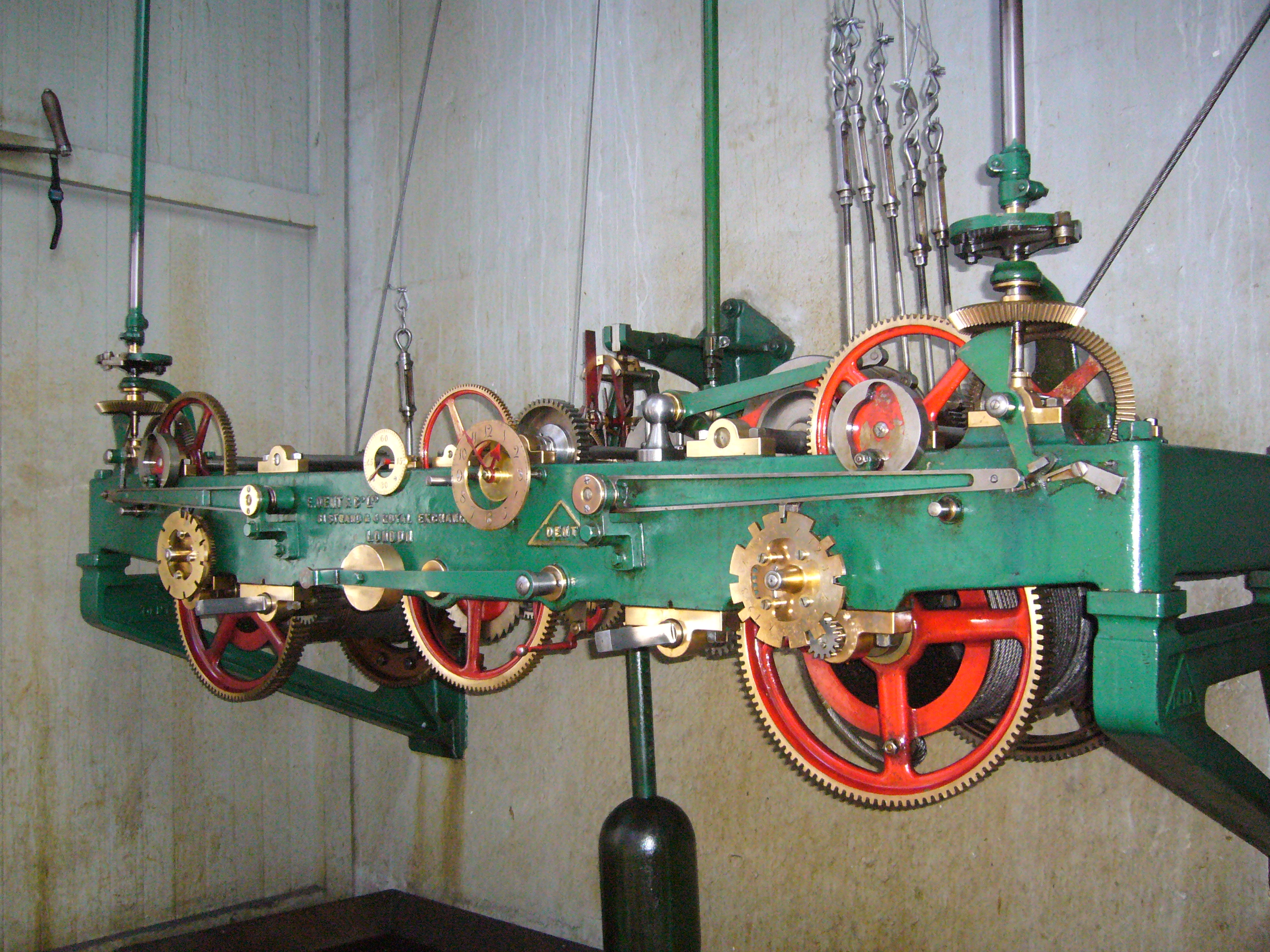
The clock machinery

== Lighting ==
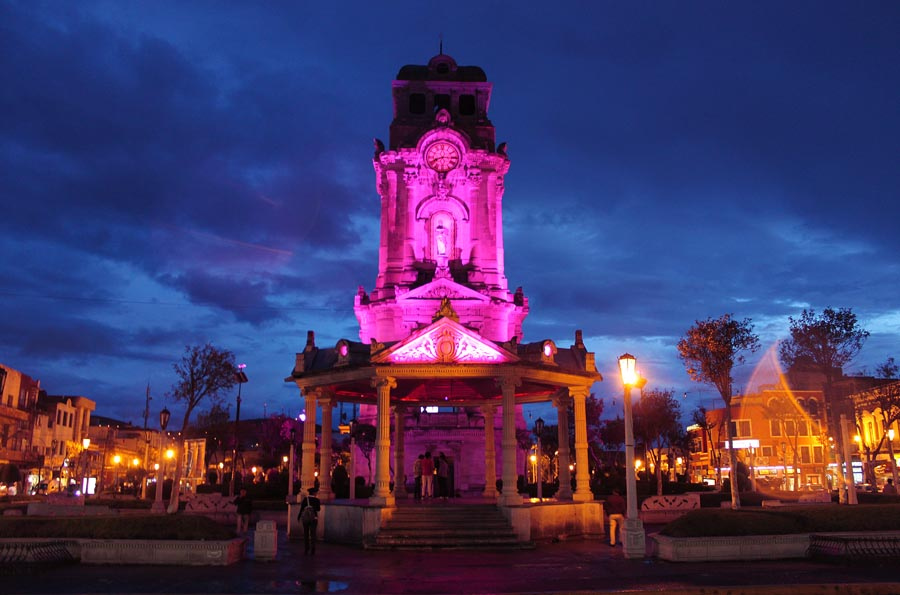
In October 2011, the building was lit pink as a symbol of unity with the global campaign to combat breast cancer.

On January 16, 2011, the lighting was inaugurated, and the project leaders were Javier Villaseñor and Javier González, directors of lighting design, and Santiago Bautista, who was in charge of installing the equipment. They used LED technology to light up the four sides of the building, highlighting the dial as well as the sculptures. The LEDs reduce energy use by about 88% compared with traditional halogen lights. The following was used for the illumination:

- 60 LED projectors of different power and scope
- 40 m of LED strip
- 14 digital controllers to communicate between all the equipment
- 1 digital memory to control all the effects ("the Brain")
