= Dear Pen Pal =

- Short story by A. E. van Vogt
- Country: United States
- Language: English
- Genre: Science fiction

Publication
- Published in: The Arkham Sampler
- Publication type: Periodical
- Media type: Print (magazine, hardback & paperback)
- Publication date: Winter 1949

"Dear Pen Pal" is a humorous, epistolary science-fiction short story by the Canadian-American writer A. E. van Vogt, originally published in the Winter 1949 issue of The Arkham Sampler.

The story was republished (as "Letter from the Stars") in the July 1950 issue of Out of This World Adventures. One of van Vogt's most popular short pieces, it was first collected in 1951's Far Boundaries; it subsequently appeared in many anthologies, including 1952's Destination: Universe!, the 1957 Ace Double The Earth in Peril, and 2010's The Arkham Sampler: A Facsimile Edition.

== Plot ==
The story takes the form of a correspondence between Skander, an alien, and an unnamed human (whose replies are not presented.) In his initial letter, Skander spends some time describing himself and his home planet in the constellation Auriga, whose intelligent lifeforms are long-lived, highly radioactive, and chromium-based, thriving at a temperature of around 900 degrees Kelvin. Skander admits that he intercepted the human's application to the pen-pal program, but justifies this act by the assertion that he is lonely and in need of conversation, due to serving a thirty-year prison sentence for conducting an illegal scientific experiment which is implied to have harmed many of his fellow Aurigans. Oddly anxious to know what his human pen pal looks like, the alien sends him a set of photographic plates which can be triggered by simply thinking a mental command at them.

Depiction of Skander in Out of This World Adventures (1950)

In the penultimate letter, Skander gleefully reveals that the "photographic plates" (which have just been activated) are actually a type of consciousness-transfer device, and that he intends to switch bodies with the human, thereby evading the balance of his prison sentence. His plan is to skip from body to body, only returning to his own at the end of his sentence, at which point he will maroon the human's consciousness in the last body he hijacks; he contemptuously notes that his pen pal should consider this a beneficial trade, as humans are - by Aurigan standards - fairly short-lived.

The last letter is from the unnamed human - now occupying Skander's body - to Skander, now in the human's body. The human had immediately suspected that Skander harbored an ulterior motive and had given the plates to Earth authorities, who analyzed them and uncovered their true purpose. However, the human voluntarily chose to see the scheme through. He drily notes that Skander will by now have discovered that the body he has taken over has been paralyzed since birth and has a heart condition; he closes with the sardonic hope that Skander enjoy what little time he has left.
