= Embryo space colonization =

To use embryos isolated from humanity in space

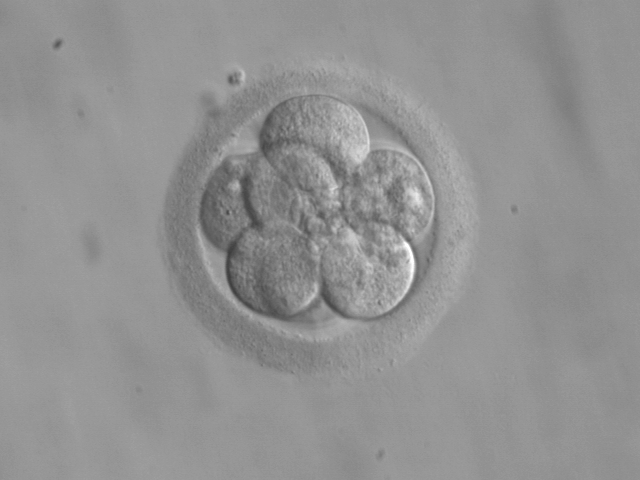
8-cell embryo for transfer in in-vitro fertilization

Embryo space colonization is a theoretical interstellar space colonization concept that involves sending a robotic mission to a habitable exoplanet or other viable target for terraforming transporting frozen early-stage human embryos or the technological or biological means to create human embryos. The proposal circumvents the cost and scale demands of other interstellar colonization concepts.

== Various concepts ==
Embryo space colonization concepts involve various ways of delivering the embryos from Earth to an extrasolar planet around another star.

- The most straightforward concept is to make use of embryo cryopreservation. Modern medicine has made it possible to store frozen human embryos in various low-development stages (up to several weeks into the development of the embryo) for decades or more.
- Another scenario would use in vitro fertilisation to create human embryos from frozen sperm and eggs, all likewise well established technologies.
- Far more speculatively, artificial gene synthesis could be used to abiogenically construct DNA with nonliving material, reproducing genes from purely digital computer files of individual humans' whole genome sequencing, for implantation into a natural or artificial cell, creating a live human zygote 'from scratch'. This scenario would also allow self-replicating spacecraft to spread humanity arbitrarily far with absolute minimal physical payload.

== Mission at destination ==
Regardless of the cargo used in any embryo space colonization scenario, the basic concept is that upon arrival of the embryo-carrying interstellar starship at landfall, fully autonomous robots would build the first settlement on the planet and start growing food. More ambitiously, the world may be terraformed first. Thereafter the first embryos could be unfrozen (or created as outlined above), gestated, and the first generation of colonists raised to adulthood by machines.

Without adult human crew, one of the technologies needed for the proposal are artificial wombs capable of supporting embryos from before implantation, which today remain under development. The embryos would need to develop in such artificial wombs until sufficiently greater than minimum viable population and genetic diversity to procreate by entirely natural means.

== Comparison to other interstellar colonization concepts ==
- Proposals of generation ships and sleeper ships require very large spacecraft to transport humans, life support systems and other equipment or food as well as an even larger propulsion system and fuel for a long span of time. Even optimistic proposals outline megaprojects that verge on or exceed the capabilities of present or future civilization on Earth. In contrast, an embryo ship would have feasibly small dimensions in the range of today's spacecraft, as the most important "cargo" would not need much space or weigh very much.
- Sustained acceleration significantly faster than 1ɡ would kill the crew of a generation ship. Passengers on a sleeper ship, and especially cargo of an embryo ship, could withstand far greater ɡ-forces.
- Sleeper ship proposals call for putting adult humans into stasis. While there is research into artificial human hibernation and deep freeze cryonics, the complexity of a living adult human body has so far frustrated such technologies.
- Sleeper ships and generation ships would deliver to a prospective colony a population that has undergone some degree of education, training, and socialization in areas reconcilable with those of the sponsor culture (e.g. historical, scientific, and technical education, language acquisition, an understanding of the original mission and broader cultural norms), individuals who are born into colony worlds through embryo space colonization would initially lack this education.

== Difficulties in implementing the concept ==
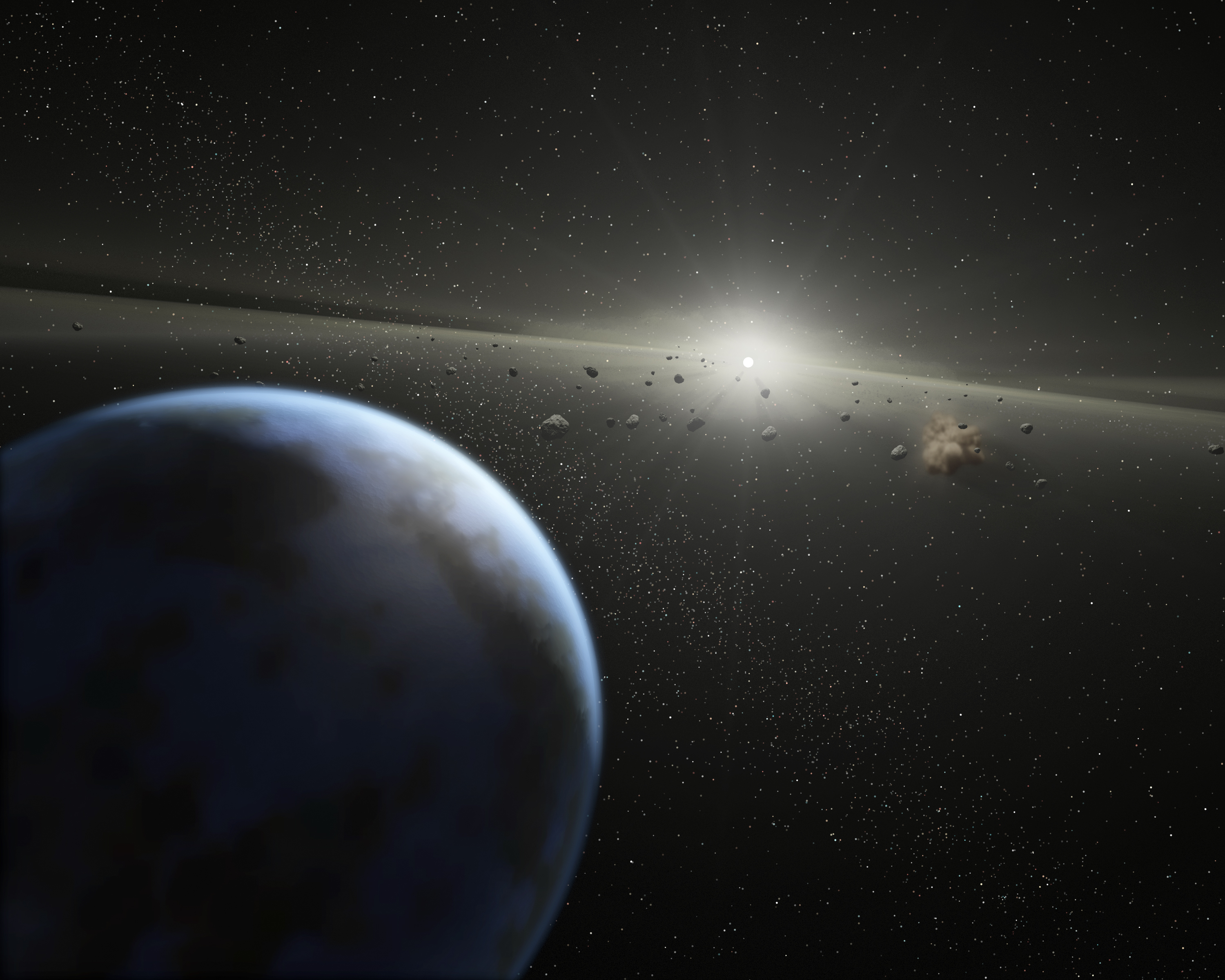
Artist's impression from 2005 of the planet HD 69830 d. Embryo space colonization depends on the existence of a habitable terrestrial exoplanet.

Like every proposal for interstellar colonization, embryo space colonization depends on solutions to still-unsolved technological problems. Some of these are:

- Robotics: Whether it will be possible to develop fully autonomous robots that can build the first habitable settlement on the target planet and raise the first humans, is unclear. Because the initial probe must be maximally compact, the industrial robots that build the habitat would themselves have to be built and maintained autonomously from local materials. Though such technology does not yet exist, there are strong economic incentives to develop it, which are unrelated to space colonization.
- Artificial Intelligence: It would be challenging to create an artificial intelligence, whether wholly synthetic or through some kind of mind uploading, that could serve as an adequate foster parent and successfully nurture human children who have no contact with other human beings. Its design would have to include strategies for the transmission of terrestrial culture and language, as well as the prerequisites for its own psychology and leadership, to persons who cannot interact with Earth. The system would have to be robust and adaptable to prevent malfunction or failure when caring for the human colony, as no repairs from Earth are reasonably possible. The early colony would be severely dependent upon the AI, effectively viewing it as their family, culture, government, and economy, with unforeseeable social consequences.
- Artificial womb: Artificial wombs exist today for variously mature fetuses, but they have yet to successfully complete full-term development from embryo to neonate even in animal experiments. Human embryos have been successfully grown in an artificial womb for 13 days. There is a 14-day rule, codified into law in twelve countries, preventing human embryos from being kept in artificial wombs past 14 days.
- Long-duration computers: Computer hardware would need to function reliably over long periods of time, in the range of several thousands of years for current day propulsion.
- Propulsion: Furthermore, a propulsion system would be required that could accelerate the embryo ship to a high speed and slow it down again upon nearing the destination. Even assuming a speed one hundred times faster than any of today's space probes and a target planet within a couple of hundred light years would lead to a journey lasting several thousands of years.
- Exoplanet found: Finally this depends on the existence of an exoplanet qualifying for colonization within a reachable distance, or other resources capable of sustaining the construction of some other settlement. Current or future science missions like the Hubble, James Webb, or TESS space telescopes may very well yield results for this requirement in the near future.

Further unknowns that affect the feasibility of embryo space colonization are:

- Biological: Will genetic material survive intact on a space mission that could potentially last centuries? Exposure to cosmic rays is known to irreparably damage DNA. What other symbiotic lifeforms does a human need to live a healthy life? For example, gut flora and many other species of microorganisms may be necessary for proper biological and immunological functioning. Babies normally acquire these from their mothers and the wider environment, but this would not be the case for embryos in colonization ships. Aside from humanity, how many and which other species from Earth should be introduced into this new ecosystem, especially depending on how much terraforming is needed?
- Ethical: In addition to the question of whether it is technically feasible to raise children without human contact, there is the further question of whether this is morally permissible. It is found to be unethical to deliberately create children that will grow up without the guidance and support of human parents and community, yet embryo space colonization requires this. Will the initial group of children birthed and raised in this environment suffer psychological trauma, with other negative social effects for future generations? Controversial value judgments would also need to be made about whose DNA should be the basis of the space colony. Should they be selected by some metric of merit, or randomly from the general population? Either choice presents ethical problems. Should the parenting AI firmly steer the children to maximize the chances of the colony's success, or should it accept the risk of allowing them significant autonomy? Which languages and cultural values should be transmitted to the colonists? Should they be raised according to some value system that exists on Earth, or create one that is somehow optimized? Are there truths that should be kept from them? The possibility of a new civilization that starts without a cultural legacy might appeal to cults that want their values to become a norm for an entire society. Is it permissible to allow them to have their own embryo colonies, where the AI indoctrinates the colonists only in the cult's value system? The difficulty of answering these and other ethical questions may become a non-technological obstacle to embryo space colonization.

== See also ==
- Embryogenesis
- Uploaded astronaut
