= Rule (surname) =

Rule is an English surname. Notable people with the name include:

- Albert Leroy Rule (1886–1943), World War I documentary film producer and director
- Amiria Rule (born 1983), New Zealand rugby player
- Ann Rule (1935–2015), American true crime writer
- Bert L. Rule (1891–1878), Popular music composer and arranger
- Bob Rule (1944–2019), American basketball player
- Charlize Rule (born 2003), Australian footballer
- Christopher Rule (1895–1983), American comic book artist
- Elton Rule (1916–1990), American television executive
- Francis Rule (1835–1925), Cornish miner who moved to Mexico and became immensely wealthy
- Gilbert Rule (c. 1629–1701), Principal of Edinburgh University
- Glenn Rule (born 1989), English soccer player
- Ja Rule (born 1976), American rapper, singer and actor
- Jack Rule Jr. (born 1938), American professional golfer
- Jane Rule (1931–2007), Canadian writer
- Janice Rule (1931–2003), American actress
- Kevin James Rule (born 1941), Australian botanist
- Margaret Rule (1928-2015), English underwater archaeologist
- Megan Rule, New Zealand architect
- Stan Rule (1924-2007), Australian rules footballer
- Stephen Rule (born 1952), English Rugby Union and Rugby League player and coach
- Wendy Rule (born 1966), Australian musical artist
- William Rule (American editor) (1839–1928), American newspaper editor and politician

== See also ==
- Rhule, surname
- Rühle, surname
