= Far Boundaries =

1951 anthology edited by August Derleth

- Dust-jacket from the first edition
- Editor: August Derleth
- Language: English
- Genre: Science fiction
- Publisher: Pellegrini & Cudahy
- Publication date: 1951
- Publication place: United States
- Media type: Print (hardback)
- Pages: x, 292

Far Boundaries is an anthology of science fiction stories edited by American writer and anthologist August Derleth. It was first published by Pellegrini & Cudahy in 1951. Many of the stories had originally appeared in the magazines Variety, Dublin Literary Magazine, Knight’s Quarterly Magazine, Scribner's, Astounding Stories, The Arkham Sampler, Planet Stories, Super Science Stories, Thrilling Wonder Stories, Startling Stories, The Magazine of Fantasy & Science Fiction, Blue Book and Galaxy.

== Contents ==
- "From a Private Mad-House", by Humphrey Repton
- "Missing One’s Coach: An Anachronism", Anon.
- "Tale of a Chemist", Anon.
- "The Last American", by J. A. Mitchell
- "Infinity Zero", by Donald Wandrei
- "Frankenstein—Unlimited", by H. A. Highstone
- "Open, Sesame!", by Stephen Grendon
- "Tepondicon", by Carl Jacobi
- "The Fear Planet", by Robert Bloch
- "De Profundis", by Murray Leinster
- "Invasion", by Frank Belknap Long
- "'Dear Pen Pal'", by A. E. van Vogt
- "Time to Rest", by John Beynon Harris
- "An Ounce of Prevention", by Paul A. Carter
- "The Song of the Pewee", by Stephen Grendon
- "And Lo! The Bird", by Nelson S. Bond
- "The One Who Waits", by Ray Bradbury
- "Holiday", by Ray Bradbury
- "The Man Who Rode the Saucer", by Kenyon Holmes
- "Later Than You Think", by Fritz Leiber

== Reception ==
P. Schuyler Miller received the anthology favorably, characterizing it as a "source-book in imaginative literature." The Meriden Record praised Far Boundaries as "a well-rounded anthology capable of causing the mind to spin at the same time that it makes the spine crawl."

== Sources ==
- Contento, William G. "Index to Science Fiction Anthologies and Collections". Archived from the original on 2007-12-22.
- Tuck, Donald H. (1974). The Encyclopedia of Science Fiction and Fantasy. Chicago: Advent. p. 139. ISBN 0-911682-20-1.
