= Rhule =

Rhule is a surname. Notable people with the name include:

- Matt Rhule (born 1975), American football coach
- Raymond Rhule (born 1992), South African rugby union player

== See also ==
- Jacob Plange-Rhule (1957–2020), Ghanaian physician and academic
- Rühle, surname
- Rule (surname)
