= Rühle =

Rühle is a German surname. Notable people with the surname include:

- Alice Rühle-Gerstel (1894–1943), German-Jewish writer, feminist, and psychologist
- August Otto Rühle von Lilienstern (1780–1847), Prussian officer
- Frank Rühle (born 1944), German rower who competed for East Germany both in the 1968 and 1972 Summer Olympics
- Günther Rühle (1924–2021), German theatre critic, author and theatre manager.
- Heide Rühle (born 1948), German politician and Member of the European Parliament
- Hugo Rühle (1824–1888), German physician
- Otto Rühle (1874–1943), German council communist
- Stephanie Ruhle (born 1975), managing editor and news anchor for Bloomberg Television and editor-at-large for Bloomberg News
- Tobias Rühle (born 1991), German footballer
- Vern Ruhle, (1951–2007) former American right-handed pitcher and coach in Major League Baseball

== See also ==
- Rhule, surname
- Rule (surname)
