= The Rulers =

- Short story by A. E. van Vogt
- Country: United States
- Language: English
- Genre: Science fiction short story

Publication
- Published in: Astounding
- Publication type: Periodical
- Media type: Magazine
- Publication date: March 1946

"The Rulers" is a golden age science fiction short story by A. E. van Vogt, originally published in Astounding in March 1946. It was included in several anthologies, including 1952's Destination: Universe!.

== Plot ==
Dr. Alexander Latham is a Washington-based psychomedician, one who studies human reactions to the point they can almost read minds. At a dinner party, another guest is defending his argument that in these modern times anything can be made artificially. When someone objects that the human mind is too complex, he responds that the psychoactive drug known simply as h effectively makes a second mind. Knowing Latham is familiar with h, and sensing the possibility of a memorable party, the hostess invites Latham to recount a story of its use.

In the post-war era, a number of European nationalities were barred from the United States except for medical reasons, and the government began to suspect they were using hospitals to set up clandestine meetings. Latham is part of a program to canvas hospitals looking for these meetings. He finds the secret meeting space in a hospital in Middle City, but the group, The Committee, is prepared for his arrival. He only just manages to escape.

Meeting his secretary in a diner to plan their escape from the city, they find themselves the topic of a police bulletin on the television. Latham attempts to call his superiors, but the call is intercepted and rerouted to a member of The Committee. They manage to make it to an air-taxi stand, only to find the driver immediately recognizes them as well. They take off and force the driver to parachute from the cab.

Pondering how the group could have possibly hypnotized everyone they meet, Latham finally realizes they must have used the "h-drug", developed by his former professor, which induces a sort of hypnosis. He surmises The Committee has put it in the water supply and then triggered it through radio and television. The chase continues until his secretary suddenly changes emotionally and pulls a gun on him, also under the influence of h.

He is returned to the Committee's meeting room, where it is explained that their group has existed for hundreds of years, plotting to build a ruling elite. Minor events like Napoleon and the US's independence have set their plans back over the years, but with the use of h, they finally have the tool needed to complete their domination of the US and England.

Given a chance to speak, Latham notes they have missed an important point about h. It is not a hypnosis drug in the common sense of the term, it actually releases a second personality, one that is highly suggestible. He goes on to note that there is a third such personality, which can also be released with h. The Committee members realize what he is implying too late; as they rush to trigger a weapon to kill him, Latham orders the guards to shoot the device.

Back at the dinner party, the other guest concedes that he did not truly understand h.

== Reception ==
The Rulers has not been widely reviewed. One of the few to mention it was a 1952 review of Destination: Universe in Galaxy Science Fiction which mentions the "coldness of his writing and the woodenness of his characterizations" and calling the story as one "from his Complicated Periods".
