= The Sound (short story) =

- Short story by A. E. van Vogt
- Country: United States
- Language: English
- Genre: Science fiction

Publication
- Published in: Astounding
- Publication type: Periodical
- Media type: Magazine, Paperback
- Publication date: February 1950

"The Sound" is a science fiction short story by Canadian American writer A. E. van Vogt, originally published in Astounding in February 1950.

The story takes place during a war between humanity and the alien Yevd, a species with the organic ability to project holographic disguises and fire energy blasts. Over the course of a single night filled with cat-and-mouse intrigue, a young boy thwarts the efforts of a Yevd espionage ring to infiltrate a vast military spaceship-construction yard.

Like much of van Vogt's earlier work, the story has an atmosphere of paranoia, in this case specifically evocative of the second Red Scare.

== Plot ==
Humanity has spent years in an on-and-off war with the Yevd, an expansionist species from the galactic core which communicates in the electromagnetic spectrum; their light-emitting organs can also be used to cloak their bodies in optical illusions, and can - in the form of high-power bursts - be used offensively. As they do not use sound for communication, Yevd lack auditory organs; to communicate with humans, they use small vocalizer boxes, though these are not very sensitive and cannot pick up low sounds. Their mastery of light makes Yevds master infiltrators; humans first discover their hostile intent when a burglar is killed at a secret lab and reverts to the form of one of the aliens. After the latest resumption of hostilities, the human United Governments have launched a project to build the Ship, an enormous warship expected to tip the balance of the conflict. The Yevd are aware of this, and have repeatedly tried to infiltrate the Yard, the massive industrial zone at the center of Solar City where the Ship is being built, but humans have successfully kept them out with air barriers which circulate an assortment of microbes lethal to the aliens.

Diryl Dexter Craig (or "Diddy"), a nine-year-old boy, is on his first hunt for the Sound, a mysterious humming that can be heard for miles around the Yard. An overnight quest to find the source of the Sound is a rite of passage for young boys in Solar City and considered unremarkable by their parents, though Diddy is younger than most boys who attempt their first hunt. As he begins to explore the outer precincts of the Yard, he is approached by a policeman; an uncanny-valley effect immediately makes the boy realize it is in fact a Yevd spy. The Yevd enlists his cooperation by telling him that the bacterial defense system may no longer work, and asks Diddy to help test it by crossing into the Yard and returning. The policeman takes a sample of his blood, and apparently rapidly generates a countermeasure allowing him to cross into the yard. Several more Yevd join Diddy, disguised as other boys on the hunt.

As they explore the mostly-empty Yard, they encounter a young woman who offers to tell them each a secret that will help them find the Sound. The disguised Yevd are dismissive, but Diddy is told (in a whisper) that he is being watched by unseen Yard counterintelligence agents, and that the night's events part of a trap to eliminate a ring of Yevd infiltrators. She instructs him to retrieve a gun hidden below a girder nearby, and to head for a particular building housing engineering blueprints while pretending to look for the Sound. Diddy does so, and is given further instructions through a low-volume speaker, through which unseen Yard agents explain that the Yevd cannot use their light emission cells at high power in the presence of fluorine. Yard agents have pumped the building full of the gas, and the Yevd who are rummaging through it for classified data are now defenseless, since any attempt to fire their biological lasers would cause them to burst into flame. Diddy is told to enter the building and shoot everyone; he does so, moving from room to room until the building is cleared.

With the threat ended, Diddy leave the Yard and joins a crowd of other boys watching the sunrise from a hilltop after a night of hunting for the Sound. In conversation with one of them, Mart, both simultaneously realize the true nature of the Sound: it does not originate from one particular location, but is the all-pervasive hum of all the machinery of the Yard blended together.

== Continuity ==
"The Sound" took place in the same continuity as van Vogt's 1949 story "The Green Forest." While the stories shared no characters in common, the Yevd were the antagonists of both, and the biological weapons used to secure the Yard in the second story were implied to be what the protagonists of the earlier one had been seeking in the jungles of the planet Mira 23.

Both stories were incorporated into van Vogt's 1959 fixup The War Against the Rull, as the fourth and fifth of the novel's six constituent stories. The book was set during a similar galactic conflict between humanity and the alien Rulls, with whom van Vogt replaced the Yevds in the rewritten stories. Unlike the Yevds, who hailed from the Milky Way, had exchanged ambassadors with humans, and were engaged in a relatively low-intensity territorial war, the Rulls were an implacably hostile extra-galactic species bent on exterminating all other intelligent life. The two races were also physically quite unlike one another; the Rulls were bone-white, muscular, carnivorous worms who ambulated with the aid of numerous suckers and fed by paralyzing large prey (including humans) before burrowing into the body cavity and consuming the victim from the inside. By contrast, the Yevd were tall, angular, and black, with many piston-like reticulated arms and legs; they possessed a biological ability to communicate via modulated light, project holographic disguises, and fire energy blasts. Some of these qualities were transferred to the Rulls in the fixup, considerably altering their overall nature.

== Reception ==
A 1952 review of Destination: Universe in Galaxy Science Fiction was mostly positive, despite finding fault with the "coldness of [van Vogt's] writing and the woodenness of his characterizations." It nonetheless briefly dismissed the story as "not tops".
