= Francis Rule =

Cornish miner

- Born: 1835; Camborne, Cornwall, England
- Died: 24 June 1925 (aged 89–90); Mexico
- Occupations: Miner, businessman
- Known for: El Rey de la Plata

Francis Rule (1835 – 24 June 1925) was a Cornish miner who moved to Mexico and became immensely wealthy by using pumping equipment to explore previously flooded and abandoned mines. He found and exploited rich seams of silver and use the funds to form various mining companies.

The town of Pachuca holds various public buildings and monuments financed by Rule.

== Life ==
Francis Rule was born in 1835 in Troon, Camborne, Cornwall. His parents were John Rule and Anne Mayne. At the age of 17 he decided to seek his fortune abroad and sailed from Penzance to Mexico. He reached the port of Veracruz in 1854, aged 18, and went on to the Pachuca mining district of Hidalgo where he first worked as a guard on the carriages that took the minerals to Mexico City. Rule's first job paid him 14 centavos a day. He was one of many Cornish miners who emigrated from England to other countries as the Cornish industry declined, taking with them their knowledge of modern techniques.

The mining industry in Mexico, which had once been strong, had stagnated. Miners who understood how to use pumping machinery to work flooded mines were in demand. Rule advanced in his profession, and became a mine captain, spending most of his spare time exploring abandoned mines in search of veins that might still be productive. In 1875 Rule joined with William Stoneman, also from Camborne, and Christopher Ludlow from Penzance to form the Cia. De Sta Gertrudis company to exploit the Santa Gertrudis Vein. After the company found ore that was rich in silver, shares shot up from $80 to $5,000. The company imported a Harvey & Co. pumping engine and steam hoist from Cornwall in 1879, making it possible to mine down to 240 metres (790 ft). In 1890 the company bought a second pump to raise water from lower levels to the first pump. Rule was made manager and a board member of the Santa Gertrudis company in 1893. Santa Gertrudis, entirely managed by Cornishmen, was wildly successful. The mine returned profits of over $1 million in 1903. It was sold in 1910 for more than $9 million, an immense sum at the time.

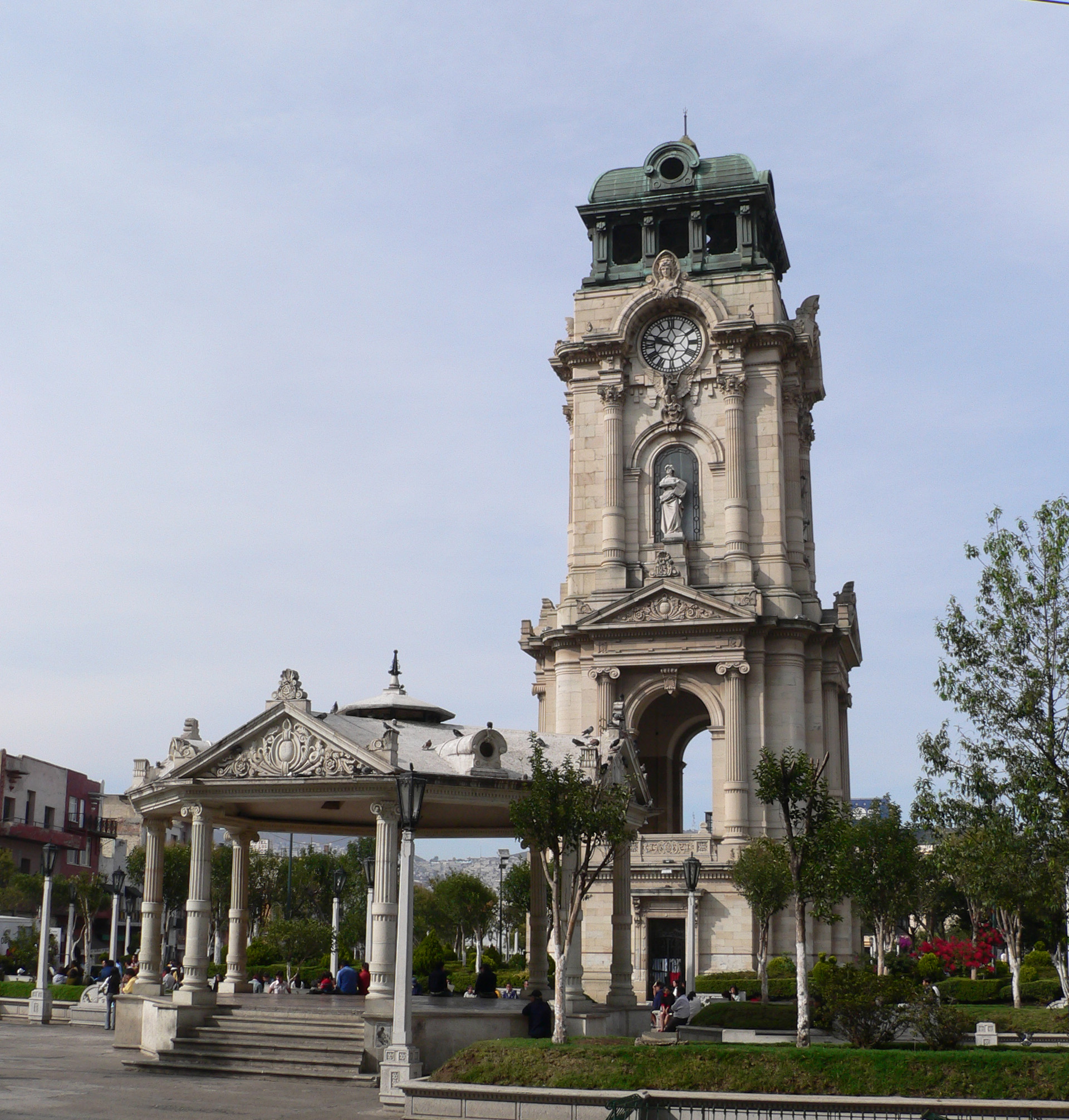
Monumental Clock of Pachuca

Rule took the Spanish form of his name, Francisco Rule, and became extremely wealthy and very influential. He was known as "El Rey de la Plata" (the Silver King). Mining shares could rise or fall when he gave an opinion. The list of mines and companies Rule became involved with is impressive. He was the last Cornish administrator of Real del Monte. Rule was also involved in the Maravillas Anexas Mining Company, which extracted gold, silver, lead and zinc, and the Santa Ana Mine. He bought the La Blanca y Anexas concession in 1876, and made a major strike there in 1903.

In 1896 Rule inaugurated a huge French Renaissance style house on Plaza General Pedro Maria Anaya in Pachuca, the Casa Rule. He entertained notables there at lavish meals, including Porfirio Díaz, President of Mexico. He also owned a house in Mexico City, eight haciendas in Hidalgo and Querétaro, a special railway coach, the Hotel de los Baños, the Gran Hotel Grenfell, the Rule Bank and many other properties.

Rule married Mary Hoskings on 17 December 1864 at the British Consulate in Mexico City. They had nine children (one died in infancy). Mary died on 11 April 1910 and is buried in the British Cemetery of Real del Monte. After Mary's death there were family squabbles over possession of the Casa Rule. Francisco moved to Mexico City, where he married María Cristina Cárdenas y Sánchez Hidalgo, with whom he had another six children. After the chaos of the Mexican Revolution of 1911 the Cornish community in Pachuca shrank. Rule visited Cornwall in 1912, where he told a local paper he was "British to the backbone". When the Governor of Hidalgo told him he could not fly a Union Jack from his bank, he built a 1.75 metres (5.7 ft) parapet on the building with the flag in open masonry.

Rule died of pneumonia on 24 June 1925 at the age of 88. He is buried in the Spanish Pantheon of Mexico City.

== Casa Rule ==
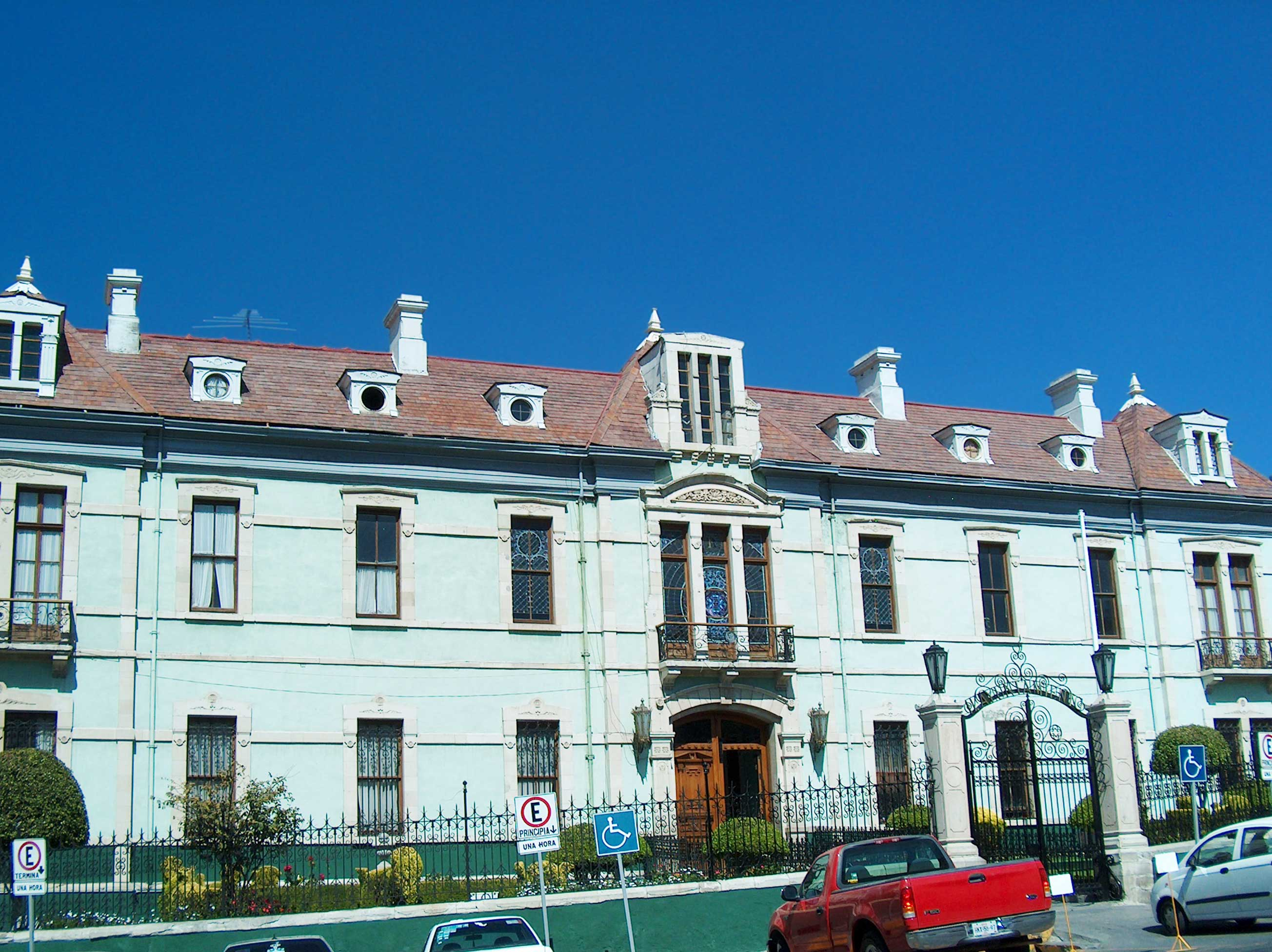
Casa Rule

Rule used the ground floor of the Casa Rule for the offices of his mining businesses. There were windows on the Calle Morelos through which miners were given their pay. He lived on the second floor with his first wife, Mary Hoskin, and their eight children, Lucretia Ann, William Mayne, Frances Mary, John Charles, Frances Henry, Julia Alice, Lillian Bessie and Richard. The third floor held the servants' quarters. The roof was originally covered with imported slate. The mansion was decorated in the finest European style, with fine wood and velvet furniture, lamps, mirrors, curtains, gold objects, ivory, porcelain and fireplaces with inlaid Carrara marble. Above the fireplace were the flags of Mexico and Britain, showing his love for both countries. A large dining room could hold 40 people.

Rule gave the Casa Rule to the State of Hidalgo when he retired.

During the revolution seven state governors stood on the balcony of the Casa Rule to call for independence. The municipal government moved to the house in 1923. After Rule's death in 1925 there were legal arguments over ownership of the Casa Rule, which his widow Cristina Cárdenas claimed for her six children. In 1944 Governor José Lugo Guerrero bought the house for 65,000 pesos as the seat of executive power.

The "Casa Rule" is now the Pachuca Municipal Palace. The 2-story house surrounds a central courtyard, and has a European style. The entrance shows neo-classical influences, with pilasters supporting an entablature with a pediment, cornices and corbels. One of the leaded stained glass windows is in the office of the general secretary of the presidency, on the second floor, with a circular design of flowers and plant motifs. At the top it has the initials "FR" and the year 1896.

== Legacy ==
In addition to the Casa Rule, Rule financed construction of the Methodist Church in Pachuca, which was still standing in 2012. He helped finance the Reloj Monumental, a large clock in Pachuca designed in Spanish Baroque style that has a mechanism and chimes that imitate Big Ben of London. The mechanism of the clock was Rule's gift to the city. The 40 metres (130 ft) clock tower in French Neoclassical style was presented in 1910 on the centenary of Mexico's independence.

In 2008 the mayor of Camborne visited Pachuca where she signed a friendship agreement between the two towns in the Pachuca town hall, Rule's former home.

== Sources ==
- Abraham Ramírez (20 August 2008), "Rescata Sara Montes historia de Casa Rule", El Sol de Hidalgo (in Spanish)
- Aída Suárez Chávez (2012), Cementerio Británico de Real del Monte, espíritu de un pasado (PDF) (in Spanish) (2 ed.), Dirección General de Publicaciones e Impresos del Gobierno del Estado de Hidalgo, archived from the original (PDF) on 4 March 2016
- "Francis Rule", The Cornish in Latin America, University of Exeter
- Jacobs, Daniel; Fisher, John (20 August 2007), The Rough Guide to Mexico, Rough Guides, ISBN 978-1-84353-843-1
- Lorna Leadbetter (Autumn 2012), "23rd Rosyer Lecture: Cornish Miners in Mexico" (PDF), London Cornish Association Newsletter, London Cornish Association
- "Casa Rule (Pachuca, Hidalgo)", Mexico Desconocido (in Spanish), Iasa Comunicación, 19 July 2010
- Richard Williams (Summer 2001), "Cornish cemetery in Mexico" (PDF), Industrial Archaeology News (117), Association for Industrial Archaeology
- Sara Montes Romero (2016), La Casa Rule (PDF), Museo Virtual de Pachuca
- Tamsin Butler (2013), "Mexico: The Cornish Connection", Journey Latin America
- "The family that travelled from Cornwall to Mexico – and back again", Cornish Mining, 24 August 2011
- This is Cornwall (23 July 2008), "Visit strengthens link forged by Cornish miners", West Briton
