= Far Centaurus =

- Short story by A. E. van Vogt
- Cover of January 1944 Astounding
- Country: United States
- Language: English
- Genre: Science fiction

Publication
- Published in: Astounding SF
- Publication type: Periodical
- Media type: Magazine, Paperback, Graphic novel
- Publication date: January 1944

"Far Centaurus" is a science fiction short story by Canadian-American writer A. E. van Vogt, first published in Astounding Science Fiction in January 1944. Writer and critic P. Schuyler Miller called it "unforgettable and unforgotten."

The story involves the crew of a sleeper ship that arrives at Alpha Centauri after five centuries, only to find the planets there already settled by people who arrived in faster-than-light ships. The basic idea of technological progress rendering previous advances obsolete, has been explored in many works.

== Plot summary ==
Pelham (Note: Pelham's first name is never mentioned.) invents Eternity, a drug that puts the body into a hibernation-like state that can last decades. Realizing that this makes interstellar space travel possible, his rich college friend Jim Renfrew builds an atomically powered spacecraft capable of missions lasting hundreds of years. To fill out the crew, they are joined by two of their other college friends, Ned Blake and Bill Endicott. The ship is launched some time in the 23rd century making for Alpha Centauri, a 500-year journey.

The story is told through the perspective of Bill. He is the first to awaken, 53 years after launch. He learns that Pelham did not survive the initial dose of the drug, and is forced to dispose of the decayed body. He files a log report and sends a radio message back to Earth before taking another dose of the drug, enough to last 150 years. As he falls asleep he worries about Renfrew, who was a close friend of Pelham and of precarious mental state.

He awakes and reads a log entry from Renfrew. It is entirely routine and does not mention Pelham. He then reads Blake's entry and finds a separate sheet explaining that he is also worrying about Renfrew. He tells Bill to destroy the sheet so that Renfrew will not see it. Bill then files his own routine reports and takes another 150 year dose.

He awakes with alarm bells going off around the ship. Forced to listen to them while he slowly awakes from the effects of the drug, he finally looks in various viewers and finds a spaceship on fire. After searching for lifeboats with no result, he notices the hulk is slowing, and watches it as the fire fades away and the ship disappears into space. He takes his last dose, timed so he will awaken a few months from their destination.

He awakens and is helped by Blake, who had awoken two weeks earlier. Renfrew woke shortly after Blake. On a lark, Blake had turned on the radio receiver and found the space around Alpha Centauri filled with human voices. In the time it took for their ship to reach Alpha Centauri, human science had progressed to the point where the flight from Earth now takes only three hours. Renfrew cannot handle the strain and goes mad. Blake is forced to restrain him, and then contacts the authorities at Centauri in order to arrange a ship to come and pick them up.

On board the massive ship, they meet Cassellahat. He explains that they had been waiting for their arrival for some time, and he had been trained to speak their now-dead language. As he moves to shake their hands, Bill notices him wrinkle his nose in apparent disgust, and Cassellahat explains that they have an extremely offensive odour. As he quickly leaves, Renfrew comes out of the ship, apparently cured after only a few minutes. Cassellahat returns to take Renfrew for further treatment on the planet Pelham.

After treatment, Renfrew returns and explains that he had taken some of their money and bought a spaceship. Because they could not be seen in public due to their smell, they have nothing to do, and he suggests they go off on a mapping expedition. After three months, Bill begins to worry about Renfrew again, seeing him studying Bill and Ned. While Renfrew is on watch and the others are resting, he ties them up. They escape, but it is too late; Renfrew has sent the ship into a collision course with a "bachelor sun". (Note: The bachelor suns are described as old, very cool Class M stars with the "rubber science" property of expelling all nearby mass to maintain "balance".) The sun flings them 500 years into the past, where they return to Earth and live the rest of their lives there. Bill is an old man when his first radio report reaches Earth.

== Publications ==
The idea for "Far Centaurus" arose in a discussion between van Vogt and John W. Campbell, publisher of Astounding. In a letter to van Vogt, Campbell lays out the entire concept, in which a sleeper ship arrives at its destination to find its target planet already colonized. Although van Vogt made changes to some of the details, the basic concept remained largely unchanged.

The story was first published in the January 1944 edition of Astounding, and later as part of the 1952 collection Destination: Universe! It was one of three stories used as the basis for one of van Vogt's fix-up novels, 1970's Quest for the Future. It was once again published in its original form in 2003's Transfinite: The Essential A.E. van Vogt.

Several third party collections have also featured the story, such as Robert Silverberg's 1973 anthology Deep Space: Eight Stories of Science Fiction and Isaac Asimov's 1981 The Great Science Fiction Stories: Volume 6: 1944. It has appeared in about a dozen collections in total.

The story was also used, almost verbatim and without crediting van Vogt, in 1951's graphic novel story "The Long Trip", published in Weird Fantasy. Weird Fantasy was infamous for its copyright violations of this sort.

Much less well known, van Vogt's "Centaurus II" concerns the voyage of the second ship to make the trip, a generation ship that never completes its voyage. Although showing similar themes and components, the story is not considered a sequel, as it involves an entirely unrelated plot.

== Impact ==
"Far Centaurus" poses the problem of whether to launch a spaceship or wait for technology to improve (the wait calculation problem in interstellar travel research) – or more broadly, whether to use any technology in its current form or wait. This problem is widespread, and the story remains a common example raised during these discussions. Gregory Matloff recalls Robert Forward invoking it:

He had a famous plot of the velocity of human beings versus time. And he said if this is true, and you launch a thousand-year ship today, in a century somebody could fly the same mission in a hundred years. They're going to be passed and will probably have to go through customs when they get to Alpha Centauri A-2.

The basic plotline has been used as the basis for many other stories. One that precedes "Far Centaurus" is "The Voyage That Lasted 600 Years" by Don Wilcox. It was published in Amazing Stories October 1940. Unlike in "Far Centaurus" only one of the crew is in hibernation most of the time. The rest of the passengers are awake and reproduce. It is thus a story of a "generation-ship". The ship arrives and they find that a colony is already established and that the journey now takes only 6 years. Among later stories, one of the most direct was by Clifford D. Simak, who used it as the basis for his 1976 book Shakespeare's Planet, which uses not only the overall plot of arriving to find the planet settled, but also the minor plot points of one of the crew dying en route, and oversleeping due to the unexplored nature of the drug. Robert Heinlein uses a variation on the theme in Time for the Stars, where the crew of a slower than light exploratory ship, believing all is lost, is contacted by a faster than light ship that comes and takes them back to Earth.

Colin Wilson considered that the opening impressed by showing the enormous distance to be covered in travelling to another star. But he felt that the ending was weak – "the author has no idea of how to finish his story".

== Sources ==
- Gilster, Paul (November 17, 2004). "Remembering 'Far Centaurus'". Centauri Dreams.
- Walwyn, Isaac (August 27, 2015). "Far Centaurus". Sevagram.
