= August Derleth bibliography =

This is a list of the writings of the American writer August Derleth.

== Novels ==
Sac Prairie Saga
- Still is the Summer Night (1937)
- Wind Over Wisconsin (1938)
- Any Day Now (1938)
- Restless is the River (1939)
- Evening in Spring (1941)
- Sweet Genevieve (1942)
- Shadow of Night (1943)
- The Shield of the Valiant (1945)
- The House of Moonlight (1953)

Mill Creek Irregulars

- The Moon Tenders (1958)
- The Mill Creek Irregulars (1959)
- The Pinkertons Ride Again (1960)
- The Ghost of Blackhawk Island (1961)
- The Tent Show Summer (1963)
- The Irregulars Strike Again (1964)
- The House by the River (1965)
- The Watcher on the Heights (1966)
- The Prince Goes West (1968)
- Three Straw Men (1970)

Judge Peck mysteries

- Murder Stalks the Wakely Family (1934)
- The Man on All Fours (1934)
- Sign of Fear (1935)
- Three Who Died (1935)
- Sentence Deferred (1939)
- The Narracong Riddle (1940)
- The Seven Who Waited (1943)
- Mischief in the Lane (1944)
- No Future for Luana (1945)
- Fell Purpose (1953)

Other

- Bright Journey (1940)
- Oliver, The Wayward Owl (1945)
- The Country of the Hawk (1952)
- The Captive Island (1952)
- Death by Design (1953)
- Empire of Fur (1953)
- Land of Gray Gold (1954)
- Land of Sky Blue Waters (1955)
- The House on the Mound (1958)
- Wilbur, The Trusting Whippoorwill (1959)
- The Hills Stand Watch (1960)
- Sweet Land of Michigan (1962)
- The Beast in Holger's Woods (1968)

== Sac Prairie Saga ==
- Place of Hawks (1935)
- Country Growth (1940)
- Wisconsin Earth: A Sac Prairie Sampler (1948)
- Sac Prairie People (1948)
- Wisconsin in Their Bones (1961)
- Country Matters (1996)
- Return to Sac Prairie (1996)
- The Lost Sac Prairie Novels (2000), including The Odyssey of Janna Meade (first published in the Star Weekly magazine December 3, 1949); The Wind in the Cedars (also as Happiness Shall Not Escape) (first published in Redbook Magazine, January 1946), Lamplight for the Dark (first published in Redbook Magazine January 1941); Shane's Girls (also as Happiness is a Gift) (first published in Redbook Magazine 1948)

== Solar Pons ==
- "In Re: Sherlock Holmes" – The Adventures of Solar Pons (UK: The Adventures of Solar Pons) (1945)
- The Memoirs of Solar Pons (1951)
- Three Problems for Solar Pons (1952)
- The Return of Solar Pons (1958)
- The Reminiscences of Solar Pons (1961)
- "The Adventure of The Orient Express" (short tale, 1964)
- Mr. Fairlie's Final Journey (novel, 1968)
- Terror over London (unreleased novel, published in 2018)
- The Casebook of Solar Pons (1965)
- A Praed Street Dossier (1968)
- The Chronicles of Solar Pons (1973)
- The Solar Pons Omnibus (1982)
- The Final Adventures of Solar Pons (1998) - includes "More from Dr. Parker's Notebooks"

=== Posthumous Collections ===
1. The Original Text Solar Pons Omnibus Edition (2000)
2. The Apocrypha of Solar Pons (2018)
3. The Dragnet Solar Pons et al. (2011), expanded as The Arrival of Solar Pons: Early Manuscripts and Pulp Magazine Appearances of the Sherlock Holmes of Praed Street (2023)

== Horror and the Cthulhu Mythos ==
- Someone in the Dark (1941)
- Something Near (1945)
- Not Long for this World (1948)
- The Survivor and Others (1957)
- The Mask of Cthulhu (1958)
- Lonesome Places (1962)
- The Trail of Cthulhu (1962)
- Mr. George and Other Odd Persons (1963) as Stephen Grendon
- Colonel Markesan and Less Pleasant People (1966) with Mark Schorer
- The Watchers Out of Time and Others (1974)
- Dwellers in Darkness (1976)
- In Lovecraft's Shadow (1998)
- Who Shall I Say is Calling & Other Stories S. Deziemianowicz, ed. (2009)
- The Sleepers and Other Wakeful Things (2009)
- August Derleth's Eerie Creatures (2009)
- That Is Not Dead: The Black Magic & Occult Stories by August Derleth (2009)

== Science fiction ==
- Harrigan's File (1975)

== Other ==
- Consider Your Verdict (1937) as Tally Mason

== Short fiction ==
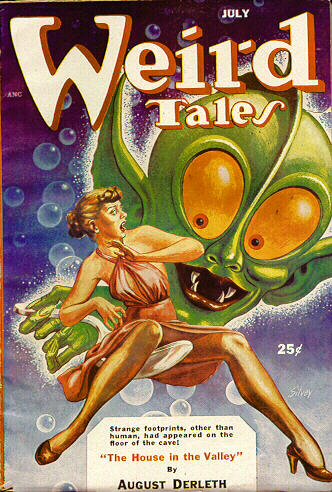
Derleth's novelette "The House in the Valley" was the cover story in the July 1953 issue of Weird Tales, illustrated by H. Silvey

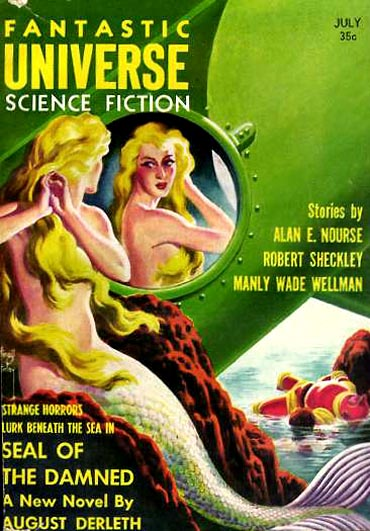
Derleth's novelette "The Seal of the Damned" was the cover story in the July 1957 issue of Fantastic Universe, illustrated by Virgil Finlay. This story was later republished under the title "The Seal of R'lyeh".

- Bat's Belfry (1926)
- The Coffin of Lissa (1926)
- The Devil's Pay (1926)
- The Night Rider (1927)
- The River (1927)
- The Sleepers (1927)
- The Turret Room (1927)
- The Conradi Affair (1928) with Carl W. Ganzlin
- The Philosophers' Stone (1928)
- The Statement of Justin Parker (1928)
- The Tenant at Number Seven (1928)
- The Tenant (1928)
- The Three-Storied House (1928)
- "Melodie in E Minor" (1929)
- The Deserted Garden (1929)
- A Dinner at Imola (1929)
- He Shall Come (1929)
- The House on the Highway (1929)
- The Inheritors (1929)
- An Occurrence in an Antique Shop (1929)
- Old Mark (1929)
- Scarlatti's Bottle (1929)
- The Adventure of the Black Cardinal (1930)
- "Just a Song at Twilight" (1930)
- Across the Hall (1930)
- The Lilac Bush (1930)
- A Matter of Sight (1930)
- Mrs. Bentley's Daughter (1930)
- The Pacer (1930)
- The Portrait (1930)
- The Whistler (1930)
- The Bridge of Sighs (1931)
- The Captain Is Afraid (1931)
- Prince Borgia's Mass (1931)
- The Bishop Sees Through (1932)
- The Shadow on the Sky (1932)
- The Sheraton Mirror (1932)
- Those Who Seek (1932)
- The House In the Magnolias (1932)
- Birkett's Twelfth Corpse (1933)
- An Elegy for Mr. Danielson (1933)
- Nellie Foster (1933)
- The Thing that Walked on the Wind (1933)
- The Vanishing of Simmons (1933)
- The White Moth (1933)
- A Cloak From Messer Lando (1934)
- Feigman's Beard (1934)
- The Metronome (1934)
- Wild Grapes (1934)
- Mr. Berbeck Had a Dream (1935)
- Muggridge's Aunt (1935)
- Lesandro's Familiar (1936)
- The Return of Sarah Purcell (1936)
- The Satin Mask (1936)
- The Telephone in the Library (1936)
- Glory Hand (1937)
- McGovern's Obsession (1937)
- The Panelled Room (1937)
- The Shuttered House (1937)
- The Wind from the River (1937)
- Three Gentlemen in Black (1938)
- Logoda's Heads (1939)
- Mrs. Elting Does Her Part (1939)
- The Second Print (1939)
- The Return of Hastur (1939)
- After You, Mr. Henderson (1940)
- Bramwell's Guardian (1940)
- The Sandwin Compact (1940)
- "Come to Me!" (1941)
- Altimer's Amulet (1941)
- Beyond the Threshold (1941)
- Compliments of Spectro (1941)
- Ithaqua (1941)
- Here, Daemos! (1942)
- Lansing's Luxury (1942)
- Mrs. Corter Makes Up Her Mind (1942)
- Headlines for Tod Shayne (1942)
- Mr. Ames' Devil (1942)
- Baynter's Imp (1943)
- McElwin's Glass (1943)
- No Light for Uncle Henry (1943)
- A Thin Gentleman with Gloves (1943)
- A Wig for Miss DeVore (1943)
- The Dweller in Darkness (1944)
- Lady Macbeth of Pimley Square (1944)
- Pacific 421 (1944)
- The Trail of Cthulhu (also as The House on Curwen Street) (1944)
- Carousel (1945)
- The God-Box (1945)
- The Inverness Cape (1945)
- The Lost Day (1945)
- Mrs. Lannisfree (1945)
- The Watcher from the Sky (1945)
- A Collector of Stones (1946)
- Pikeman (1946)
- A Little Knowledge (1948)
- The Lonesome Place (1948)
- Saunder's Little Friend (1948)
- Something in Wood (1948)
- The Whippoorwills in the Hills (1948)
- Kingsridge 214 (1949)
- The Slayers and the Slain (1949)
- The Testament of Claiborne Boyd (also as The Gorge Beyond Salapunco) (1949)
- Twilight Play (1949)
- The Closing Door (1950)
- The Fifth Child (1950)
- The Island Out of Space (1950)
- The Ormolu Clock (1950)
- Potts' Triumph (1950)
- A Room in a House (1950)
- The Keeper of the Key (1951)
- A Knocking in the Wall (1951)
- The Man Who Rode the Saucer (1951)
- The Other Side of the Wall (1951)
- Something from Out There (1951)
- "Who Shall I Say is Calling?" (1952)
- The Black Island (1952)
- The Lost Path (1952)
- McIlvaine's Star (1952)
- The Night Road (1952)
- The Place of Desolation (1952)
- "Sexton, Sexton, in the Wall" (1953)
- Century Jumper (1953)
- A Corner for Lucia (1953)
- The Detective and the Senator (1953)
- The Disc Recorder (1953)
- The Ebony Stick (1953)
- The House in the Valley (1953)
- Invaders from the Microcosm (1953)
- The Maugham Obsession (1953)
- A Traveler in Time (1953)
- Mark VII (1954)
- The Mechanical House (1954)
- The Penfield Misadventure (1954)
- The Place in the Woods (1954)
- The Remarkable Dingdong (1954)
- Thinker, Mark VII (1954)
- The Dark Boy (1956)
- The Martian Artifact (1957)
- The Seal of R'lyeh (1957)
- Halloween for Mr. Faulkner (1959)
- Lovecraft and "The Pacer" (excerpt) (1959)
- The Adventure of the Intarsia Box (1964)
- By Rocket to the Moon (1965)
- Ferguson's Capsules (1966)
- The Adventure of the Unique Dickensians (1968)
- An Eye for History (1975)
- Protoplasma (1975)

== Journals (Sac Prairie Saga) ==
- Atmosphere of Houses (1939)
- Village Year: A Sac Prairie Journal (1941)
- Village Daybook (1947)
- Walden West (1961)
- Countryman's Journal (1963)
- Wisconsin Country: A Sac Prairie Journal (1965)
- Return to Walden West (1970)

== Poems ==
- Incubus (1934)
- Omega (1934)
- To a Spaceship (1934)
- Man and the Cosmos (1935)
- "Only Deserted" (1937)
- The Shores of Night (1947)
- Providence: Two Gentlemen Meet at Midnight (1948)
- Jacksnipe Over (1971)
- Something Left Behind (1971)

== Poetry collections ==
- Hawk on the Wind (1938)
- Man Track Here (1939)
- Here on a Darkling Plain (1940)
- Wind in the Elms (1941)
- Rind of Earth (1942)
- And You, Thoreau! (1944)
- Selected Poems (1944)
- The Edge of Night (1945)
- Habitant of Dusk (1946)
- A Boy's Way (1947) (Illustrated by Claire Victor Dwiggins)
- It's a Boy's World (1948)
- Rendezvous in a Landscape (1952)
- Psyche (1953)
- Country Poems (1956)
- West of Morning (1960)
- This Wound (1962)

== Essays/articles ==
- Regional Writing, The Writer, July 1944
- Horror Fiction, The Writer, May 1945
- Introduction (The Mask of Cthulhu) (unknown)
- Foreword (Who Knocks?) (1946)
- Foreword (The Night Side) (1947)
- Introduction (The Sleeping and the Dead) (1947)
- Foreword (Not Long for This World) (1948)
- Introduction (Strange Ports of Call) (1948)
- Introduction (The Other Side of the Moon) (1949)
- Introduction (Beyond Time and Space) (1950)
- Foreword (The Outer Reaches) (1951)
- Introduction (The Haunter of the Dark) (1951)
- Introduction (Beachheads in Space) (1952)
- Introduction (Worlds of Tomorrow) (1953)
- Foreword (Time to Come) (1954)
- Introduction (Beachheads in Space) (1954)
- Introduction (Portals of Tomorrow) (1954)
- Introduction (Worlds of Tomorrow) (1955)
- Foreword (Dark Mind, Dark Heart) (1962)
- Foreword (Time to Come) (1963)
- H.P. Lovecraft And His Work (1963)
- Introduction (Mr. George and Other Odd Persons) (1963)
- Introduction (Worlds of Tomorrow) (1963)
- Introduction (Beachheads in Space) (1964)
- Introduction (From Other Worlds) (1964)
- Foreword (The Night Side) (1966)
- Foreword (The Unspeakable People) (1969)
- Clark Ashton Smith: Master of Fantasy (1974) with Donald Wandrei

== Biography ==
- Still Small Voice (1940) – biography of newspaperwoman and writer Zona Gale
- H.P.L.: A Memoir (1945)
- Some Notes on H. P. Lovecraft (1959)
- Concord Rebel: A Life of Henry D. Thoreau (1962)
- Forest Orphans: Carl Marty and His Animal Friends (1964)
- Emerson, Our Contemporary (1970)

== History ==
- The Wisconsin: River of a Thousand Isles (1942)
- The Milwaukee Road: Its First Hundred Years (1948)
- Saint Ignatius and the Company of Jesus (1956)
- Columbus and the New World (1957)
- Father Marquette and the Great Rivers (1959)
- Wisconsin Murders (1968)
- Vincennes: Portal to the West (1968)

== Anthologies ==
- Poetry Out of Wisconsin (1937)
- Sleep No More (1944)
- Who Knocks? (1946)
- The Night Side (1947)
- The Sleeping and the Dead (1947)
- Strange Ports of Call (1948)
- The Other Side of the Moon (1949)
- Beyond Time and Space (1950)
- Far Boundaries (1951)
- The Outer Reaches (1951)
- Beachheads in Space (1952)
- Night's Yawning Peal: A Ghostly Company (1952)
- Worlds of Tomorrow (1953)
- Portals of Tomorrow (1954)
- Time to Come (1954)
- Dark Mind, Dark Heart (1962)
- New Worlds for Old (1963)
- The Sleeping and the Dead (abridged) (1963)
- The Time of Infinity (1963)
- The Unquiet Grave (1963)
- When Evil Wakes (1963)
- From Other Worlds (1964)
- Over the Edge (1964)
- Travellers by Night (1967)
- Tales of the Cthulhu Mythos (1969)
- Dark Things (1971)
- New Horizons: Yesterday's Portraits of Tomorrow (1998)

== As Stephen Grendon ==
- The Drifting Snow (1939)
- A Gentleman from Prague (1944)
- Alannah (1945)
- Dead Man's Shoes (1946)
- Bishop's Gambit (1947)
- The Extra Passenger (1947)
- The Ghost Walk (1947)
- Mr. George (1947)
- Parrington's Pool (1947)
- Blessed Are the Meek (1948)
- Mara (1948)
- The Night Train to Lost Valley (1948)
- The Tsantsa in the Parlor (1948)
- The Wind in the Lilacs (1948)
- The Blue Spectacles (1949)
- Mrs. Manifold (1949)
- Open, Sesame! (1949)
- The Song of the Pewee (1949)
- The Man on B-17 (1950)
- Balu (1949)
- Miss Esperson (1962)

== “With H. P. Lovecraft” ==
- The Lurker at the Threshold (1945)
- The Survivor (1954)
- Wentworth's Day (1957)
- The Gable Window (1957)
- The Shadow Out of Space (1957)
- The Ancestor (1957)
- The Lamp of Alhazred (1957)
- The Peabody Heritage (1957)
- The Shuttered Room (1959)
- The Dark Brotherhood (1966)
- The Horror from the Middle Span (1967)
- Innsmouth Clay (1971)
- The Watchers Out of Time (1974) (unfinished)

== With Marc R. Schorer ==
- The Elixir of Life (1926)
- The Marmoset (1926)
- The Black Castle (1927)
- The Owl on the Moor (1928)
- Riders in the Sky (1928)
- The Pacer (1930)
- In the Left Wing (1932)
- The Lair of the Star-Spawn (1932)
- Laughter in the Night (1932)
- Red Hands (1932)
- The Carven Image (1933)
- The Return of Andrew Bentley (1933)
- Colonel Markesan (1934)
- A Matter of Faith (1934)
- Death Holds the Post (1936)
- They Shall Rise (1936)
- The Woman at Loon Point (1936)
- Spawn of the Maelstrom (1939)
- The Vengeance of Ai (1939)
- The Occupant of the Crypt (1947)
- The Figure with the Scythe (1973)

== Other collaborations ==
- The Churchyard Yew (1947) as Joseph Sheridan Le Fanu
- The Adventure of the Snitch in Time (1953) with Mack Reynolds
- The Adventure of the Ball of Nostradamus (1955) with Mack Reynolds
- The House in the Oaks (1971) with Robert E. Howard
