= The Sleeping and the Dead =

1947 anthology of fantasy and horror stories edited by August Derleth

- Dust-jacket from the first edition.
- Editor: August Derleth
- Language: English
- Genre: Fantasy, horror
- Publisher: Pellegrini & Cudahy
- Publication date: 1947
- Publication place: United States
- Media type: Print (hardback)
- Pages: vi, 518

The Sleeping and the Dead is an anthology of fantasy and horror stories edited by American writer August Derleth. It was first published by Pellegrini & Cudahy in 1947. Many of the stories had originally appeared in the magazines The London Mercury, Weird Tales, Scribner's, Dublin University Magazine, Unknown, Esquire, The Bellman, Vanity Fair and Black Mask. An abridged edition (15 stories) was published by Four Square Books in 1963 under the same title. (The other 15 stories were issued in paperback as The Unquiet Grave (anthology).

== Contents ==
- Introduction, by August Derleth
- "A View from a Hill", by M. R. James
- "Glory Hand", by August Derleth
- "The Lady's Maid’s Bell", by Edith Wharton
- "The Shadows", by Henry S. Whitehead
- "Out of the Eons", by Hazel Heald
- "The Jar", by Ray Bradbury
- "The Bully of Chapelizod", by Joseph Sheridan Le Fanu
- "Over the River", by P. Schuyler Miller
- "Carnaby's Fish", by Carl Jacobi
- "The Painted Mirror", by Donald Wandrei
- "The Double Shadow", by Clark Ashton Smith
- "The Ocean Leech", by Frank Belknap Long
- "Amina", by Edward Lucas White
- "Farewell Performance", by H. Russell Wakefield
- "One Way to Mars", by Robert Bloch
- "Out of the Picture", by Arthur Machen
- "The Canal", by Everil Worrell
- "The Postman of Otford", by Lord Dunsany
- "Deaf, Dumb, and Blind", by C. M. Eddy, Jr.
- "Spider Bite", by Robert S. Carr
- "Brenner's Boy", by John Metcalfe
- "Mr. Lupescu", by Anthony Boucher
- "Masquerade", by Henry Kuttner
- "Seventh Sister", by Mary Elizabeth Counselman
- "In Amundsen’s Tent", by John Martin Leahy
- "Man in a Hurry", by Alan Nelson
- "The Last Pin", by H. W. Guernsey
- "The Doll", by Algernon Blackwood
- "The Tool", by William F. Harvey
- "The Dreams in the Witch-House", by H. P. Lovecraft
- Bibliography

== Sources ==
- Contento, William G. "Index to Science Fiction Anthologies and Collections". Archived from the original on 2008-01-06.
- Tuck, Donald H. (1974). The Encyclopedia of Science Fiction and Fantasy. Chicago: Advent. p. 140. ISBN 0-911682-20-1.
