= When Evil Wakes =

1963 anthology of fantasy and horror stories edited by August Derleth

- First edition
- Editor: August Derleth
- Language: English
- Genre: Fantasy, horror
- Publisher: Souvenir Press
- Publication date: 1963
- Publication place: United Kingdom
- Media type: Print (hardback)
- Pages: 288

When Evil Wakes is an anthology of fantasy and horror stories edited by American writer August Derleth. It was first published by Souvenir in 1963.

== Contents ==
- "The Eye and the Finger", by Donald Wandrei
- "The Feasting Dead", by John Metcalfe
- "Death Waters", by Frank Belknap Long
- "An Invitation to the Hunt", by George Hitchcock
- "The Tsanta in the Parlour", by Stephen Grendon
- "Moonlight-Starlight", by Virginia Layefiky
- "The Kite", by Carl Jacobi
- "Sweets to the Sweet", by Robert Bloch
- "A Thin Gentlemen With Gloves, by Simon West
- "The Horror at Red Hook", by H. P. Lovecraft
- "The Triumph of Death", by H. Russell Wakefield
- "The Lips", by Henry S. Whitehead
- "A Piece of Linoleum", by David H. Keller
- "The Seed From the Sepulchre", by Clark Ashton Smith
- "Canavan's Back Yard", by Joseph Payne Brennan
- "The Shuttered Room", by H. P. Lovecraft & August Derleth

== Sources ==
- Tuck, Donald H. (1974). The Encyclopedia of Science Fiction and Fantasy. Chicago: Advent. p. 140. ISBN 0-911682-20-1.
