= Norman Adams =

Norman Adams may refer to:

- Norman Adams (American artist) (1933–2014), American commercial artist and illustrator
- Norman Adams (British artist) (1927–2005), British artist and professor of painting
