= The Unquiet Grave (anthology) =

1964 anthology of fantasy and horror stories edited by August Derleth

- Cover of the first edition
- Editor: August Derleth
- Language: English
- Genre: Fantasy horror
- Publisher: Four Square Books
- Publication date: 1964
- Publication place: United Kingdom
- Media type: Print (paperback)
- Pages: 254

The Unquiet Grave is an anthology of fantasy and horror stories edited by American writer August Derleth. It was first published by Four Square Books in 1964. The anthology contains 15 stories from Derleth's earlier anthology The Sleeping and the Dead. Many of the stories had originally appeared in the magazines Weird Tales, Esquire and Black Mask. (The other 15 stories from the hardcover edition of The Sleeping and the Dead were published in paperback under the original title - Four Square books, 1963).

== Contents ==
- "The Shadows", by Henry S. Whitehead
- "Carnaby’s Fish", by Carl Jacobi
- "The Painted Mirror", by Donald Wandrei
- "The Double Shadow", by Clark Ashton Smith
- "One Way to Mars", by Robert Bloch
- "Out of the Picture", by Arthur Machen
- "The Canal", by Everil Worrell
- "Deaf, Dumb, and Blind", by C. M. Eddy, Jr.
- "Spider Bite", by Robert S. Carr
- "Brenner’s Boy", by John Metcalfe
- "Mr. Lupescu", by Anthony Boucher
- "Seventh Sister", by Mary Elizabeth Counselman
- "In Amundsen’s Tent", by John Martin Leahy
- "Man in a Hurry", by Alan Nelson
- "The Last Pin", by H. W. Guernsey

== Sources ==
- Contento, William G. "Index to Science Fiction Anthologies and Collections". Archived from the original on 2008-01-06.
- Tuck, Donald H. (1974). The Encyclopedia of Science Fiction and Fantasy. Chicago: Advent. p. 140. ISBN 0-911682-20-1.
