= Plus Ultra (disambiguation) =

Plus ultra (Latin for "further beyond") is the national motto of Spain and (among others) Holy Roman Emperor Charles V.

Plus Ultra may also refer to:

- Plus Ultra Líneas Aéreas, a Spanish airline
- Plus Ultra (aircraft), a Dornier Wal flying boat flown by Spanish aviators on a 1926 flight from Spain to Argentina
- AD Plus Ultra, former name of the Spanish football team Real Madrid Castilla
- Plus Ultra Brigade, an Iraq War brigade from five Spanish speaking countries: Spain, the Dominican Republic, Nicaragua, Honduras, and El Salvador
- Plus Ultra, an 1885 novel by Edward Lucas White
- Plus Ultra, a secret society in the Disney film Tomorrowland
- +Ultra, a Fuji TV programming block dedicated to anime
- Go Beyond Plus Ultra, a special phrase said by the characters All Might and Deku from My Hero Academia before striking their enemies with great force.
