= The Time of Infinity =

1963 anthology edited by August Derleth

- Cover of the first edition
- Editor: August Derleth
- Cover artist: Norman Adams
- Language: English
- Genre: Science fiction
- Publisher: Consul
- Publication date: 1963
- Publication place: United Kingdom
- Media type: Print (paperback)
- Pages: 205

The Time of Infinity is an anthology of science fiction stories edited by American writer August Derleth. It was first published by Consul in 1963 and collects nine stories from Derleth's earlier anthology The Outer Reaches. The stories had originally appeared in the magazines Fantastic Adventures, Astounding Stories, Thrilling Wonder Stories, Galaxy Science Fiction and Amazing Stories or in the anthology Invasion from Mars edited by Orson Welles.

== Contents ==
- "The Ship Sails at Midnight", by Fritz Leiber
- "The Power", by Murray Leinster
- "The Critters", by Frank Belknap Long
- "Pardon My Mistake", by Fletcher Pratt
- "Good Night, Mr. James", by Clifford D. Simak
- "The Plutonian Drug", by Clark Ashton Smith
- "Farewell to Eden, by Theodore Sturgeon
- "Co-Operate—or Else!", by A. E. van Vogt
- "Finality Unlimited", by Donald Wandrei
