= Who Knocks? =

- Dust-jacket from the first edition
- Editor: August Derleth
- Illustrator: Lee Brown Coye
- Cover artist: Audrey Johnson
- Language: English
- Genre: Fantasy, horror
- Publisher: Rinehart & Company
- Publication date: 1946
- Publication place: United States
- Media type: Print (hardback)
- Pages: ix, 391

Who Knocks? It was first published by Rinehart & Company in 1946. The anthology was reissued in UK paperback by Panther Books in 1964. Many of the stories had originally appeared in the magazines Everybody’s Magazine, The Century, Weird Tales, Unknown, Temple Bar, Hutchinson’s Magazine, The English Review, Smith's Magazine and Harper's.

== Contents ==
- Foreword, by August Derleth
- "The Shadows on the Wall", by Mary E. Wilkins Freeman
- "Running Wolf", by Algernon Blackwood
- "Old Martin", by A. E. Coppard
- "Alannah", by Stephen Grendon
- "The Shunned House", by H. P. Lovecraft
- "The Lake", by Ray Bradbury
- "The Seventeenth Hole at Duncaster", by H. Russell Wakefield
- "The Ankardyne Pew", by William F. Harvey
- "It", by Theodore Sturgeon
- "The Phantom Farmhouse", by Seabury Quinn
- "Squire Toby’s Will", by Joseph Sheridan Le Fanu
- "Negotium Perambulans", by E. F. Benson
- "The Intercessor", by May Sinclair
- "The Dear Departed", by Alice Mary Schnirring
- "The House of the Nightmare", by Edward Lucas White
- "A Reversion to Type", by Edgar Lloyd Hampton
- "The Follower", by Cynthia Asquith
- "The Ravel 'Pavane'", by Henry S. Whitehead
- "The Ghosts of Steamboat Coulee", by Arthur J. Burks
- "The Woman at Seven Brothers", by Wilbur Daniel Steele
