= Jumbee =

Caribbean mythological spirit

A jumbee or jumbie, also known as mendo or chongo in Colombia and Venezuela, is a type of mythological spirit or demon in the folklore of some Caribbean countries. "Jumbee" can be a generic name given to all malevolent entities. There are numerous kinds of jumbees, reflecting the Caribbean's complex history and ethnic makeup, drawing on African, Amerindian, East Indian, Dutch, English, and even Chinese mythology.

Different cultures have different concepts of jumbees, but the general idea is that people who have been evil are destined to become instruments of evil (jumbees) in death. Unlike the ghost folklore which represents a wispy fog-like entity, the jumbee is cast as a dark, shadowy figure.

== Regional ==
People in English-speaking Caribbean states that were colonized by the British commonly believe in this creature. The belief is also held by practitioners of Obeah, a form of mystical wizardry that encompasses traditional African beliefs and Western European, primarily Anglican, images and beliefs concerning the dead. Guyana, and various islands—including Antigua and Barbuda in the east, The Bahamas in the north and as far south as Trinidad—have long held a tradition of folklore that includes the jumbee.

In the French islands Guadeloupe and Martinique, people speak of "zombi" rather than "jumbie" to describe ghosts, revenants, and other supernatural creatures. The Étang Zombi in Guadeloupe owes its name to the legend of the wife of a slave owner who was killed by her husband for trying to free his slaves and now haunts the pond.

The people of the Congo speak of a nfumbi — ancestral ghost — which could be related to the word "jumbie."

=== British Virgin Islands and United States Virgin Islands ===
A Mocko Jumbie is a cultural stilt-dancer from the BVI and USVI, often seen in Caribbean Carnival parades. The name combines the elements of "jumbie" — a spiritual entity - and "Moko" — a tall, watchful deity who guards, heals, and delivers retribution.

=== The Bahamas ===
As Elsie Worthington Clews Parsons captured in a 1918 transcription of an old Bahamian story, the jumbee in Jamaica is often called a "sprit": "Dese sprits which you call witch people, dey lives in de air."

=== Jamaica and Barbados ===
In Jamaica and Barbados, the old Akan word "duppy" is used rather than the Kikongo-rooted word "jumbee."

=== Montserrat ===
In the folk religion of Montserrat, a jumbie is a ghost, or spirit of the dead. Jumbies are said to possess people during ceremonies called jumbie dances, which are accompanied by jumbie drums. Four couples perform a set of five progressively quicker quadrilles during the jumbie dance, switching out with other couples until someone is eventually possessed by a jumbie.

Jumbies receive numerous small offerings from Montserratians, such as a few drops of rum or food. They are also the subject of numerous superstitions. It is believed that the spirit separates from the body three days after death, at which point the havoc begins. Jumbies are believed to have the ability to shape-shift, usually taking the form of a dog, pig, or more likely, a cat.

== Characteristics ==
There are many recommended ways to avoid or escape jumbie encounters:

- If a pair of shoes is left outside the front door of a house, jumbies (who have either no feet at all, or backwards feet) will spend the entire night trying and failing to put on the shoes, rather than entering the house.
- Jumbies are similarly distracted by a heap of sand or salt or rice outside a door, since their obsessive curiosity (particularly in the case of the Firerass, or ole Higue) compels them to count every grain before the sun rises. Likewise, a rope with many knots in it will keep a jumbie busy trying to undo them until sunrise.
- Upon coming home late at night, walking backwards may prevent a jumbee from following one inside.
- If a jumbee chases a person, crossing a river may stop them; since it is believed that jumbees, like their relatives in numerous cultures, cannot follow over water.

== See also ==
- "Jumbie Jamberee", a popular calypso song
- Wekufe
- Henry S. Whitehead and the collection Jumbee and Other Uncanny Tales
- Zombie
- Moko Jumbie

== Sources ==
- "Music of Montserrat". Montserrat First, Montserrat Chamber of Commerce & Industry (MCCI) Inc. Archived from the original on January 7, 2006.
- Messenger, John (1999). "Montserrat". Garland Encyclopedia of World Music, Volume Two: South America, Mexico, Central America, and the Caribbean. Routledge. pp. 922–926. ISBN 0-8153-1865-0.
- [link broken Guyanese folklore] at Guyana Outpost
- Hochschild, Adam. King Leopold's Ghost: A Story of Greed, Terror, and Heroism in Colonial Africa. Boston, New York: Houghton Mifflin (1998, p. 15).
