= Moko jumbie =

Caribbean traditional stilt dancers

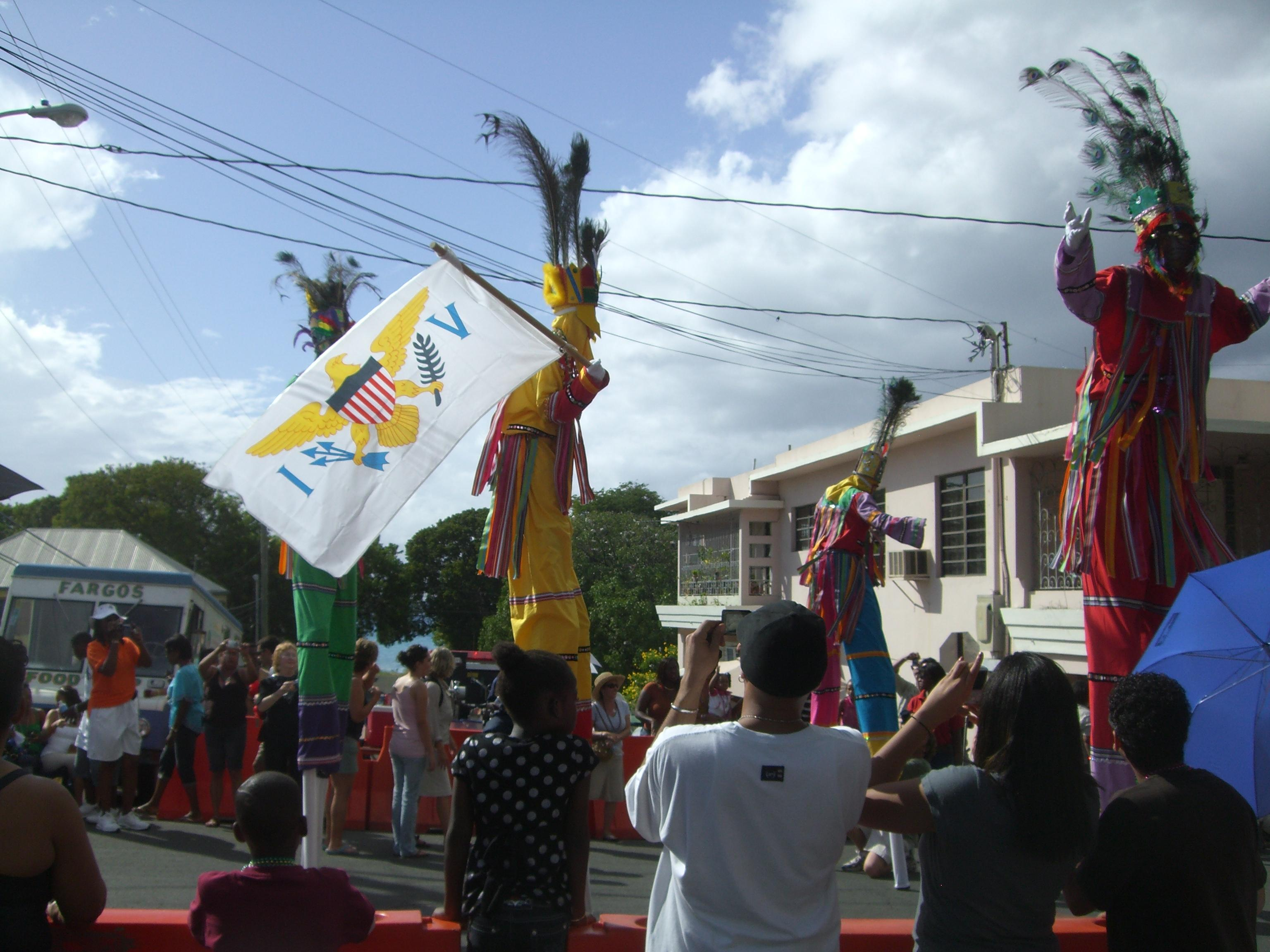
Moko Jumbie dancers in St. Croix, U.S. Virgin Islands.

A Moko Jumbie (also known as Mocko Jumbie, Moko Jumbi, Moko Jumby, or Moko Zumbi) is a traditional stilt walker or dancer associated with Caribbean Carnivals for over 200 years. Derived from West African traditions, Moko Jumbie cultural practices were introduced to the Caribbean island by enslaved Africans during the 19th century.

Moko Jumbie performers usually wear masks and costumes that blend African and European traditions. Their choreography often incorporates jumps and elements of masquerade. Traditionally, one or two Moko Jumbies would parade with a small band of musicians, often issuing blessings and warding off evil spirits. Moko Jumbies remain central to many Caribbean celebrations around the world, and now whole troupes of Moko Jumbies may march together.

== Etymology ==
The name Moko Jumbie has African and Caribbean origins. The origin of the word Moko is uncertain. Many assert the term originates from a West African term for a healer or guardian spirit. Others suggest Moko is the name of a Yoruba Orisha, or else a Kongo deity. Jumbie is commonly used across the Caribbean to refer to spirits and is related to the Haitian word Zombi.

== History ==
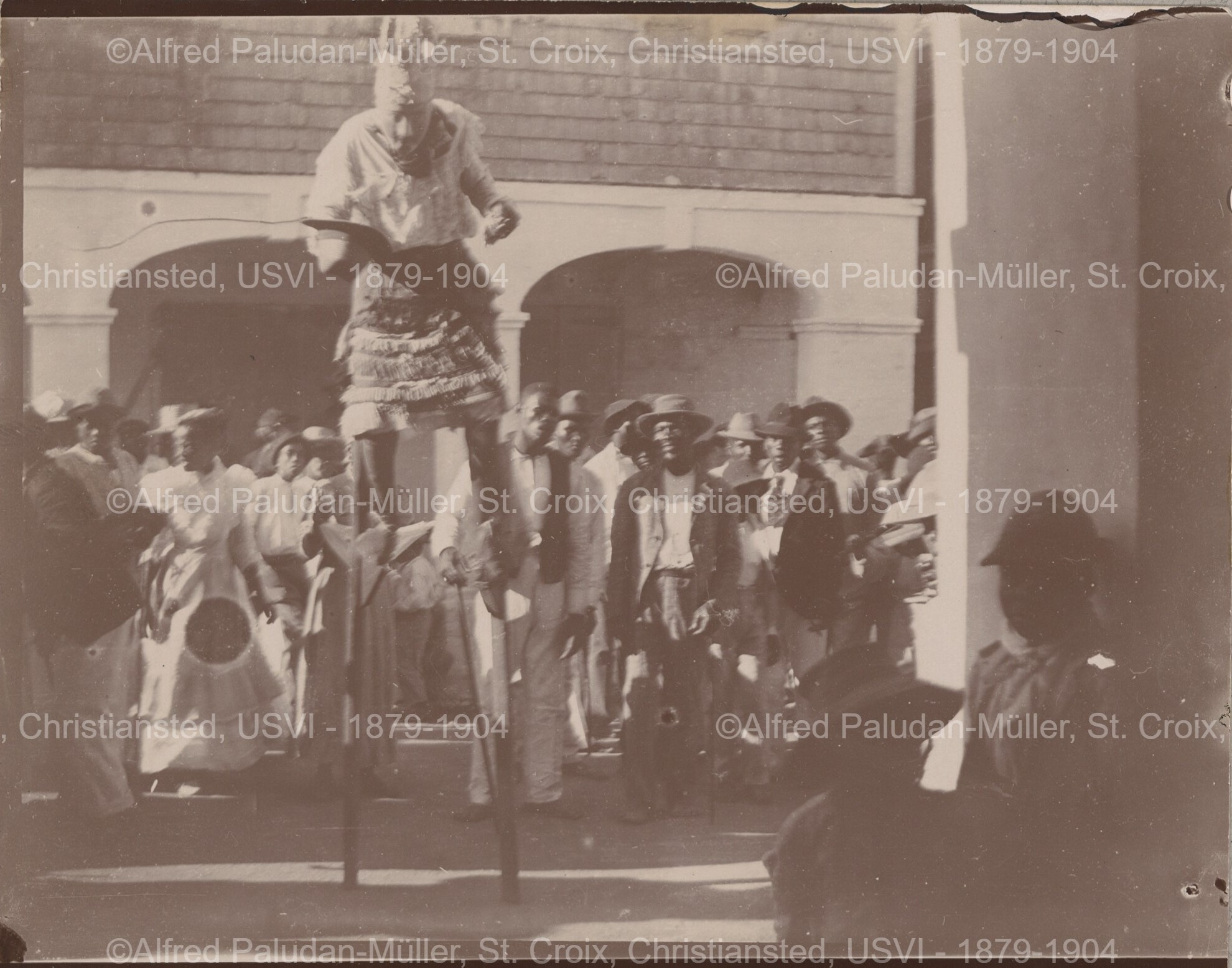
Moko Jumbie during New Year's celebration in Christiansted, St. Croix, USVI, circa 1879-1904.

Moko Jumbie is likely derived from the stilt-dancing practices of several West African peoples. The precise ancestry cannot be traced as the process of 'seasoning' Trans-Atlantic slaves sought to deliberately obfuscate the lineages of its victims. Still some cultural memory endured and thus African slaves and their descendants revived the practice as Moko Jumbie (Trinidad and Tobago) or Mocko Jumbie (US Virgin Islands).

From the 18th century, masqueraders across the Caribbean would perform in the streets and visit people's homes on festive occasions such as Christmas, New Year's Day, and Whitsun, often in the style of Moko Jumbie. This tradition appeared in locales such as Anguilla, Antigua and Barbuda, Barbados, Saint Kitts and Nevis, and Trinidad and Tobago. An early recorded appearance of the Moko Jumbie is dated to 1791 in St. Thomas in the United States Virgin Islands.

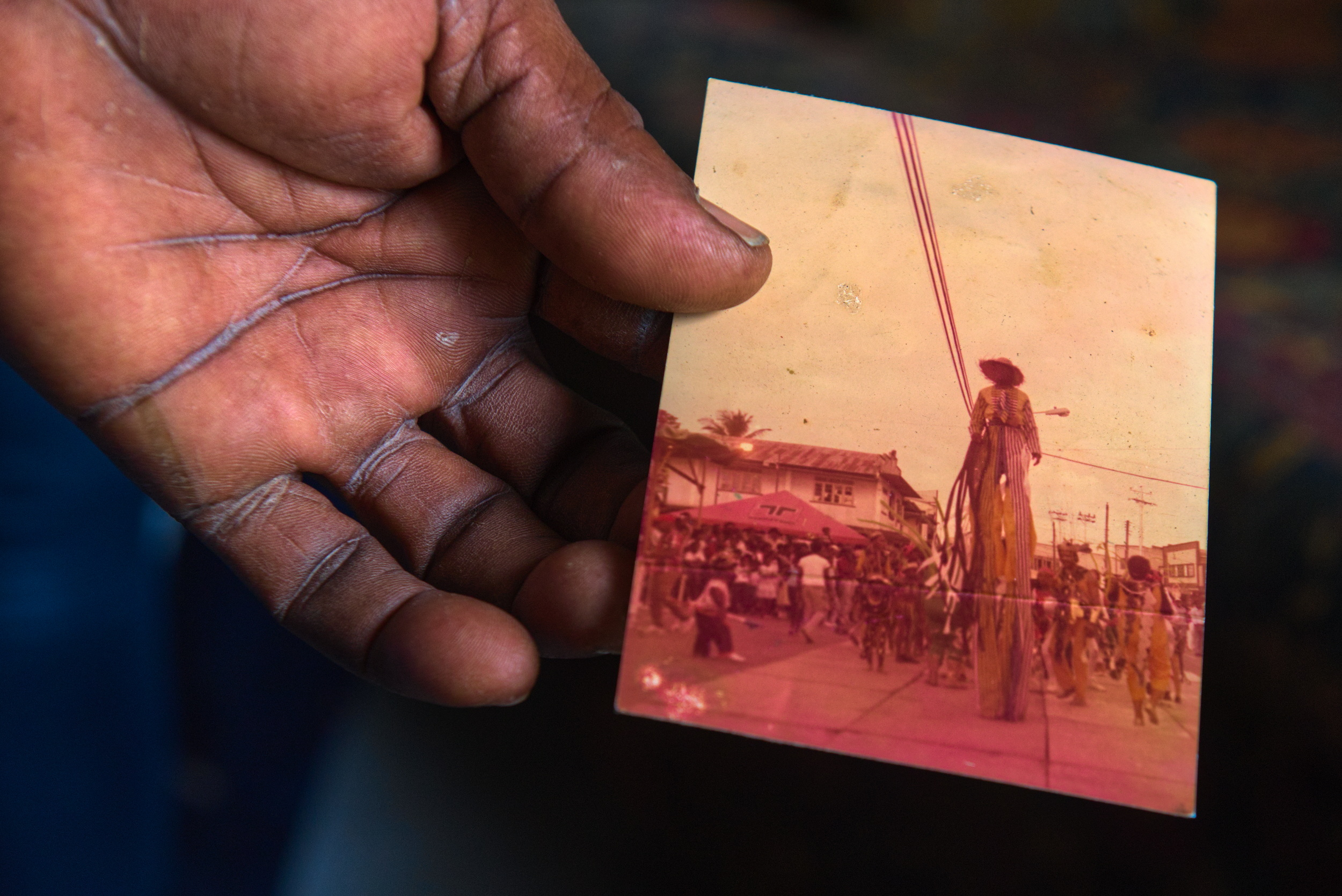
The hand of the enigmatic Dexter Stewart holds a photograph from his early days as a Moko Jumbie.

From the 1870s, records describe early Moko Jumbie costumes in Saint Vincent and the Grenadines that consisted of European women's dresses under layers of petticoats, often with headdresses to increase their height. African motifs and beadwork were gradually introduced into the designs through a process of Creolization, and likely overtook the European elements around the middle of the 20th century.

Following a period of decline in the 20th century, Moko Jumbie underwent revivals in the 1970s across the Caribbean including St. Thomas and Trinidad. In 1975 Point Fortin, Dexter Stewart—with the support of John Cupid, the advice of Dave Robeson of USVI, and Jefferson 'Ife' Wilkinson of Barbados—began re-learning the art of Moko Jumbie, eventually performing at Trinidad Carnival events and also workshops in Connecticut. In the late 1980s, Glenn 'Dragon' de Souza—with the support of Cathy Ann Samuel—independently revived the practice in North Trinidad. The later input of Mas-man Andrew Roland 'Moose' Alexander helped propel Dragon's group, Keylemanjahro, into opportunities with legendary Mas designer, Peter Minshall.

== Present day ==
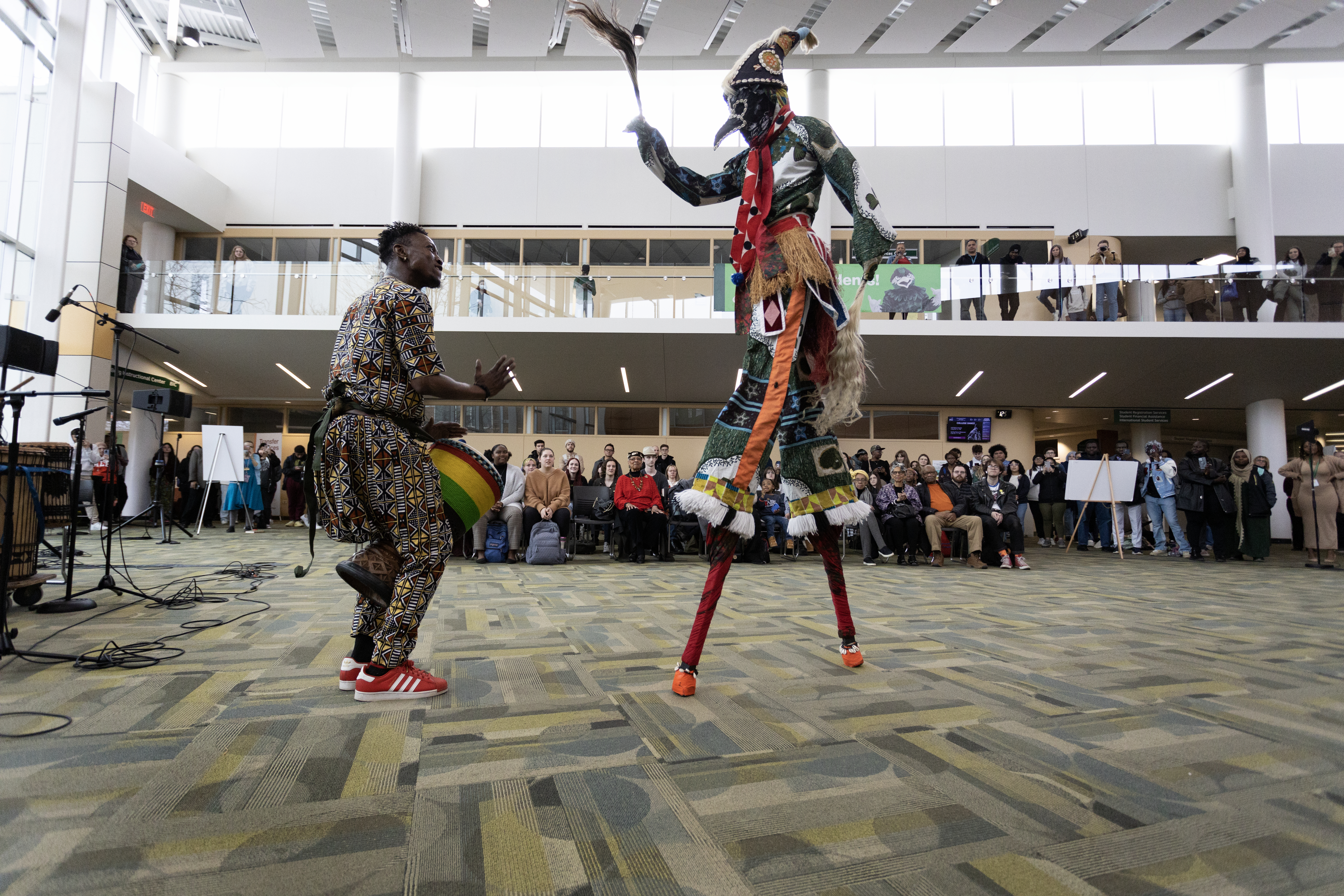
Moko jumbie dancer in Illinois.

Many Caribbean islands celebrate their Moko Jumbie traditions, including Antigua, Bermuda, and Trinidad and Tobago. It is common to see groups of Moko Jumbie performers walking together at Carnival. Training programs for young people offer mentorship as well as instruction in the techniques and historical context of Moko Jumbie.

== Popular culture ==
- In 1978, Trinidadian choreographer Geoffrey Holder used Moko Jumbies in the Broadway musical Timbuktu!
- In 2004, German photographer Stephan Falke published Moko Jumbies: The Dancing Spirits of Trinidad, which documented the activities of Glen de Souza (known as Dragon) in reviving Moko Jumbie in Trinidad and Tobago.
- In 2009, the U.S. Department of Tourism of the U.S. Virgin Islands released a new logo which features the Moko Jumbie.
- In the late 2000s, Noggin, fine edutainment spin-off of the Nick Jr. Channel, released an animated music video called "Papa Moco Jumbie", in which a little boy wants to dance like his father, a moko jumbie, in the carnival.
