= West India Lights =

1946 collection of short stories by Henry S. Whitehead

- Dust-jacket illustration by Ronald Clyne.
- Author: Henry S. Whitehead
- Cover artist: Ronald Clyne
- Language: English
- Genre: fantasy, horror
- Publisher: Arkham House
- Publication date: 1946
- Publication place: United States
- Media type: Print (hardback)
- Pages: 367

West India Lights is a collection of fantasy and horror short stories by American writer Henry S. Whitehead. It was released in 1946 and was the second collection of the author's stories to be published by Arkham House. It was published in an edition of 3,037 copies.

Most of the stories had originally appeared in the magazines Weird Tales, Strange Tales, and Amazing Stories.

== Contents ==
West India Lights contains the following tales:

1. "Black Terror"
2. "West India Lights"
3. "'Williamson'"
4. "The Shut Room"
5. "The Left Eye"
6. "Tea Leaves"
7. "The Trap" (with H.P. Lovecraft)
8. "The Napier Limousine"
9. "The Ravel Pavane"
10. "Sea Change"
11. "The People of Pan"
12. "The Chadbourne Episode"
13. "Scar Tissue"
14. "'—In Case of Disaster Only'"
15. "Bothon" (with H.P. Lovecraft)
16. "The Great Circle"
17. "Obi in the Caribbean"

== Sources ==
- Jaffery, Sheldon (1989). The Arkham House Companion. Mercer Island, WA: Starmont House, Inc. p. 19. ISBN 1-55742-005-X.
- Chalker, Jack L.; Mark Owings (1998). The Science-Fantasy Publishers: A Bibliographic History, 1923-1998. Westminster, MD and Baltimore: Mirage Press, Ltd. pp. 35–36.
- Joshi, S.T. (1999). Sixty Years of Arkham House: A History and Bibliography. Sauk City, WI: Arkham House. p. 33. ISBN 0-87054-176-5.
- Nielsen, Leon (2004). Arkham House Books: A Collector's Guide. Jefferson, NC and London: McFarland & Company, Inc. pp. 58–59. ISBN 0-7864-1785-4.
