= Jumbee and Other Uncanny Tales =

1944 collection of short stories by Henry S. Whitehead

- Dust-jacket illustration by Frank Wakefield.
- Author: Henry S. Whitehead
- Cover artist: Frank Wakefield
- Language: English
- Genre: Fantasy, Horror
- Publisher: Arkham House
- Publication date: 1944
- Publication place: United States
- Media type: Print (hardback)
- Pages: xii, 394

Jumbee and Other Uncanny Tales is a collection of fantasy and horror short stories by American writer Henry S. Whitehead. It was released in 1944 and was his first book published by Arkham House. 1,559 copies were printed. The introduction is by Whitehead's fellow Floridian Robert H. Barlow.

The stories for this volume were taken chiefly from the magazines Weird Tales and Adventure.

== Contents ==
Jumbee and Other Uncanny Tales contains the following tales:

1. "Henry S. Whitehead", by R.H. Barlow
2. "Jumbee"
3. "Cassius"
4. "Black Tancrède"
5. "The Shadows"
6. "Sweet Grass"
7. "The Black Beast"
8. "Seven Turns in a Hangman's Rope"
9. "The Tree-Man"
10. "Passing of a God"
11. "Mrs. Lorriquer"
12. "Hill Drums"
13. "The Projection of Armand Dubois"
14. "The Lips"
15. "The Fireplace"

== Reception ==
Eudora Welty, reviewing Jumbee for the New York Times, praised the collection as "gentle, matter-of-fact, rather fatherly stories which produce some of the most point-blank ghosts that have jumped at us anywhere" and concluded that "these little stories have charm -- perhaps it is the gentleness of the author's personality pervading their horrifying content that makes them piquant". E. F. Bleiler wrote that "Although the subject matter is often sensational, the treatment is restrained, smooth, and sophisticated, with much local color and with an attempt at social realism. . . . Whitehead is at his best when he discusses the folkways of the old aristocracy and middle class".

== See also ==
- Jumbee, supernatural belief in the Caribbean

== Sources ==
- Jaffery, Sheldon (1989). The Arkham House Companion. Mercer Island, WA: Starmont House, Inc. p. 8. ISBN 1-55742-005-X.
- Chalker, Jack L.; Mark Owings (1998). The Science-Fantasy Publishers: A Bibliographic History, 1923-1998. Westminster, MD and Baltimore: Mirage Press, Ltd. p. 27.
- Joshi, S.T. (1999). Sixty Years of Arkham House: A History and Bibliography. Sauk City, WI: Arkham House. pp. 26–27. ISBN 0-87054-176-5.
- Nielsen, Leon (2004). Arkham House Books: A Collector's Guide. Jefferson, NC and London: McFarland & Company, Inc. pp. 51–52. ISBN 0-7864-1785-4.
