= The Lonesome Place =

1962 short story by August Derleth

"The Lonesome Place" is a short story by American writer August Derleth. The story is part of a compilation of short stories in the book Lonesome Places. Published in 1962, by Arkham House Publishing, "The Lonesome Place" tells the story of two young boys terrorized by a mysterious creature who they believe lives in an abandoned grain elevator in their small town.

== Plot ==
The Lonesome Place is told through the eyes of Steve, the narrator, and his best friend, Johnny Newell. The two boys are very scared of the dark and they believe that something is living in the lonesome place. The lonesome place is an old grain elevator surrounded by tall trees and many piles of wood from the lumber yard that surrounds it. The story begins with the narrator's mother asking her son to run errands for her before dinner at twilight. For the boy to get to the local grocery shop he needs to cross through the old lumber yard and past the lonesome place. At first sight, the lumber yard seems harmless enough, but after the sun goes down and the stars peep out into the sky the lumber yard becomes a place where shadows lurk and screams are drowned in darkness and never heard again. In the book it says Johnny and the narrator tend to run by the lonesome place when unable to avoid it because of the scary creature that they believe lives there. Both have their own hair-raising stories of going past the lumber yard and grain elevator at night. Johnny tells the narrator how the creature almost got him the night before, showing his ripped shirt as evidence of his close escape; the narrator returns with a tale of how he heard it knock over some lumber during his own trip through. The narrator has never seen the creature, but can feel its presence.

When the boys run past the dark place their hearts race and their imagination runs wild. As they compare their experiences they conjure up a monster with big clawed feet, scales, a long tail and yet has no face. This creature waits for fearful children on which to prey. The creature is also able to climb the tree and lie in the trees. The creature also is known to lay by the lumber but the children cannot see the creature because it is so dark in The Lonesome place.

When the grain elevator is torn down and the boys are all grown up and become less fearful of the Lonesome Place, the monster waits for other fearful boys and girls in the dark. Many of the boys take their dates here because the lumber yard is so creepy for the girls. When Bobby Jeffers is killed by being mauled by some type of animal, the narrator and Johnny believe they are responsible for the boy's death, since they had left that conjured monster free to feed on another child's fear. They felt that they should have done something about it when they were younger. Now that Bobby is dead the boys feel guilt for creating the monster out of their own fears.

== Reception ==
In The Sidney Williams Journal "The Lonesome Place" is described as "one of the perfect chiller stories that focuses on the imagination."

== See also ==
- American Gothic Tales edited by Joyce Carol Oates
- Gothic Fiction

== Sources ==
- Berenbaum, Linda. The Gothic Imagination: Expansion in Gothic Literature and Art. Associated University Presses, 1982.
- Derleth, August. Writing Fiction. Greenwood Press Publishers, 1946.
- Smit, Alan. American Gothic Fiction. Continuum, 2004.
- Oates, Joyce. American Gothic Tales. Penguin Group, 1996.
- Williams, Sidney. In a Lonely Place-August Derleth. August 26, 2006..
