= The Feasting Dead =

1954 novel by John Metcalfe

- Dust-jacket illustration by Frank Utpatel.
- Author: John Metcalfe
- Cover artist: Frank Utpatel
- Language: English
- Genre: Horror
- Publisher: Arkham House
- Publication date: 1954
- Publication place: United Kingdom
- Media type: Print (Hardback)
- Pages: 123

The Feasting Dead is a horror novel by British writer John Metcalfe. It was published by Arkham House in 1954 in an edition of 1,242 copies. It was the only book published by Arkham House in 1954. A new edition was issued by Valancourt Books in 2014.

== Plot summary ==
The story is about a young English boy, Denis, who, while in France falls under the influence of a vampiric being, from the folklore of Auvergne and the misfortune that befalls him.

== Reception ==
Boucher and McComas praised the novel as "highly welcome in a period where literate supernatural horror is so rare."

== Sources ==
- Jaffery, Sheldon (1989). The Arkham House Companion. Mercer Island, WA: Starmont House, Inc. pp. 44–45. ISBN 1-55742-005-X.
- Chalker, Jack L.; Mark Owings (1998). The Science-Fantasy Publishers: A Bibliographic History, 1923-1998. Westminster, MD and Baltimore: Mirage Press, Ltd. p. 35.
- Joshi, S.T. (1999). Sixty Years of Arkham House: A History and Bibliography. Sauk City, WI: Arkham House. p. 60. ISBN 0-87054-176-5.
- Nielsen, Leon (2004). Arkham House Books: A Collector's Guide. Jefferson, NC and London: McFarland & Company, Inc. pp. 75–76. ISBN 0-7864-1785-4.
