= Strange Ports of Call =

1948 anthology of science fiction stories edited by August Derleth

- Dust-jacket from the first edition
- Editor: August Derleth
- Language: English
- Genre: Science fiction
- Publisher: Pellegrini & Cudahy
- Publication date: 1948
- Publication place: United States
- Media type: Print (hardback)
- Pages: 393

Strange Ports of Call is an anthology of science fiction stories edited by American writer August Derleth. It was first published by Pellegrini & Cudahy in 1948. The stories had originally appeared in the magazines Blue Book, Amazing Stories, Weird Tales, Science and Invention, Astounding Stories, Coronet, The New Review, The Black Cat, Thrilling Wonder Stories, Wonder Stories, Comet, The Saturday Evening Post, Collier's Weekly and Planet Stories.

== Contents ==
- Introduction, by August Derleth
- "The Cunning of the Beast", by Nelson S. Bond
- "The Worm", by David H. Keller
- "The Crystal Bullet", by Donald Wandrei
- "The Thing From—'Outside'", by George Allan England
- "At the Mountains of Madness", by H. P. Lovecraft
- "Mars on the Ether", by Lord Dunsany
- "The God-Box", by Howard E. Wandrei
- "Mr. Bauer and the Atoms", by Fritz Leiber
- "The Crystal Egg", by H. G. Wells
- "John Jones’ Dollar", by Harry Stephen Keeler
- "Call Him Demon", by Henry Kuttner
- "Master of the Asteroid", by Clark Ashton Smith
- "Guest in the House", by Frank Belknap Long
- "The Lost Street", by Carl Jacobi & Clifford D. Simak
- "Forgotten", by P. Schuyler Miller
- "Far Centaurus", by A. E. van Vogt
- "The Green Hills of Earth", by Robert A. Heinlein
- "Thunder and Roses", by Theodore Sturgeon
- "Blunder", by Philip Wylie
- "The Million-Year Picnic", by Ray Bradbury

== Reception ==
Theodore Sturgeon, reviewing the volume for Astounding Science Fiction, described it as "the most unusual science-fiction anthology to have been published to date." He noted that editor Derleth had designed the book "to present stories in the field which are good literary writing, and which have good writing's prime requisite, real characters."

== Sources ==
- Contento, William G. "Index to Science Fiction Anthologies and Collections".
- Tuck, Donald H. (1974). The Encyclopedia of Science Fiction and Fantasy. Chicago: Advent. pp. 138–139. ISBN 0-911682-20-1.
