= Portals of Tomorrow =

1954 anthology of science fiction stories edited by August Derleth

- Dust-jacket from the first edition.
- Editor: August Derleth
- Cover artist: Fiorello & Marmaras
- Language: English
- Genre: Science fiction
- Publisher: Rinehart & Company
- Publication date: 1954
- Publication place: United States
- Media type: Print (hardback)
- Pages: 371

Portals of Tomorrow is an anthology of science fiction stories edited by American writer August Derleth, intended as the first in a series of "year's best" volumes. It was first published by Rinehart & Company in 1954. The stories had originally appeared in the magazines Fantasy and Science Fiction, Future, Esquire, Fantastic Universe, Galaxy Science Fiction, Blue Book, Startling Stories, Orbit, Astounding Stories and Beyond Fantasy Fiction.

== Contents ==
- Introduction, by August Derleth
- "The Hypnoglyph", by John Anthony
- "Testament of Andros", by James Blish
- "The Playground", by Ray Bradbury
- "Gratitude Guaranteed", by R. Bretnor & Kris Neville
- "Rustle of Wings", by Fredric Brown
- "The Other Tiger", by Arthur C. Clarke
- "Civilized", by Mark Clifton & Alex Apostolides
- "Stickeney and the Critic", by Mildred Clingerman
- "The Word", by Mildred Clingerman
- "Hermit on Bikini", by John Langdon
- "Jezebel", by Murray Leinster
- "D.P. from Tomorrow", by Mack Reynolds
- "The Altruists", by Idris Seabright
- "Potential", by Robert Sheckley
- "Eye for Iniquity", by T. L. Sherred
- "Kindergarten", by Clifford D. Simak
- Outstanding Collections of Fantastic Stories Published During the Year 1953
- A Checklist of New Fantastic Stories Published in American Magazines in 1953
- A Checklist of the Best New Fantastic Stories Published in Books in 1953

== Reception ==
P. Schuyler Miller noted that Derleth's selections "hew more to old-line themes and treatments."

== Sources ==
- Contento, William G. "Index to Science Fiction Anthologies and Collections". Archived from the original on 2007-03-16.
- Tuck, Donald H. (1974). The Encyclopedia of Science Fiction and Fantasy. Chicago: Advent. p. 140. ISBN 0-911682-20-1.
