= New Worlds for Old (Derleth) =

1963 anthology of science fiction stories

- First edition
- Editor: August Derleth
- Language: English
- Genre: Science fiction
- Publisher: Four Square Books
- Publication date: 1963
- Publication place: United Kingdom
- Media type: Print (paperback)
- Pages: 126

New Worlds for Old is an anthology of science fiction stories edited by American writer August Derleth. It was first published by Four Square Books in 1963 and contains nine stories from Derleth's earlier anthology, Worlds of Tomorrow. Many of the stories had originally appeared in the magazines Fantastic, Fantasy: The Magazine of Science Fiction, Worlds Beyond, Astounding Stories, The Fantasy Fan, Fantasy and Science Fiction and Weird Tales.

== Contents ==
- "The Smile", by Ray Bradbury
- "The Fires Within", by Arthur C. Clarke
- "The Gentleman Is an Epwa", by Carl Jacobi
- "The Enchanted Forest", by Fritz Leiber
- "The Great Cold", by Frank Belknap Long
- "From Beyond", by H. P. Lovecraft
- "Line to Tomorrow", by Lewis Padgett
- "The Business, as Usual", by Mack Reynolds
- "The Martian and the Moron", by Theodore Sturgeon

== Sources ==
- Contento, William G. "Index to Science Fiction Anthologies and Collections". Archived from the original on 2007-12-22.
- Tuck, Donald H. (1974). The Encyclopedia of Science Fiction and Fantasy. Chicago: Advent. pp. 140–141. ISBN 0-911682-20-1.
