= The Milwaukee Road: Its First Hundred Years =

1948 non-fiction book by August Derleth

- First edition cover
- Author: August Derleth
- Language: English
- Series: The Railroads of America
- Published: 1948 (Creative Age Press); 2002 (University of Iowa Press)
- Publication place: United States
- Pages: 330
- OCLC: 1343197

The Milwaukee Road: Its First Hundred Years is a 1948 non-fiction book on American railroad history by August Derleth. It is an account of the Chicago, Milwaukee, St. Paul and Pacific Railroad, which was founded in 1847 as the Milwaukee and Waukesha Rail Road, and was known as the "Milwaukee Road". The book covers the first hundred years of the railroad's history from a top-down perspective, with an emphasis on corporate history.

== Synopsis ==
Derleth organized the book chronologically, save for the introduction where he reflects on his own connection to trains growing up in Sauk City, Wisconsin. This section includes several short poems. In the main text Derleth begins with the formative efforts to construct the first railroad in Wisconsin, culminating in the Milwaukee and Mississippi Rail Road, which began operations in 1851. The book narrates the history of the Milwaukee Road through its expansion in the nineteenth century, its several bankruptcies, involvement with Standard Oil, and the construction of its famed "Pacific Extension" in 1901–1909.

The book includes two appendices. Appendix A lists all subsidiary/predecessor companies and the manner of their inclusion into the Milwaukee Road, up through 1947, grouped by state. Appendix B lists all lines constructed by the Milwaukee Road in order of completion with endpoints, mileage, and date of completion. The companies cross-reference with their listings in Appendix A.

== Reception ==
Contemporary reviewers expressed mixed reactions to the book. Charles W. Paape of the Carnegie Institute of Technology criticized Derleth for writing an apologia for the Milwaukee Road and focusing too heavily on the company's administration. Irene Dorothy Neu at Cornell University echoed these criticisms, saying that Derleth's unfamiliarity with railroad history "handicapped" him and led him to rely on internal company sources, although she did praise the work as "absorbingly written." Writing in Minnesota History Rodney C. Loehr thought the book would "appeal to railroad fans" but criticized the relative lack of material concerning Minnesota. Loehr, like Paape and Neu, noted the "defensive" nature of the book but suggested that it might serve as a "needed antidote" to past attacks. The Milwaukee Road, for its part, published a favorable notice in the Milwaukee Magazine, its in-house publication.

Since publication Derleth's quotable prose and access to company records guaranteed the book a place in Milwaukee Road scholarship, and most works dealing with the railroad reference it. An annotated bibliography of Wisconsin history published in 1999 included the book and described it as "presented with a novelist's touch." Tom Murray's 2005 The Milwaukee Road quotes extensively from Derleth. Joseph P. Schwieterman's When the Railroad Leaves Town: American Communities in the Age of Rail Line Abandonment used Derleth as a principal reference for the entry on Harlowton, Montana, a former stop on the Milwaukee Road Pacific Extension. Craig Sanders incorporated it in his Limiteds, Locals, and Expresses in Indiana, 1838–1971. Matt Hiner, in a review for Railroad History on the occasion of University of Iowa Press' 2002 reprint, praised the book as "excellent, although now slightly dated" and stated that it was "neither apologist nor sycophantic."

== Publication ==
The Creative Age Press published the book as part of its "The Railroads of America" series. The Milwaukee Road did not sponsor the book for its centennial though it did cooperate with Derleth, providing "data" and "photographs." The University of Iowa Press reprinted the book in 2002 with a foreword by H. Roger Grant.
