= Beachheads in Space =

1952 anthology of science fiction stories edited by August Derleth

- Dust-jacket from the first edition
- Editor: August Derleth
- Cover artist: Ronald Clyne
- Language: English
- Genre: Science fiction
- Publisher: Pellegrini & Cudahy
- Publication date: 1952
- Publication place: United States
- Media type: Print (hardback)
- Pages: xii, 320

Beachheads in Space is an anthology of science fiction stories edited by American writer August Derleth. It was first published in hardcover by Pellegrini & Cudahy in 1952. The first British edition, containing just the introduction and a selection of seven of the stories, was issued in hardcover by Weidenfeld & Nicolson in 1954. Two paperback editions, each also containing different selections of seven stories, were issued by Berkley Books in 1957 and by Four Square Books in 1964. Four Square also reprinted the seven stories omitted from its edition in a separate 1964 anthology, From Other Worlds.

The book collects fourteen tales by various authors, together with a foreword by the editor.

== Contents ==
W = reprinted in the 1954 Weidenfeld & Nicolson hardcover; B = reprinted in the 1957 Berkley paperback; F1 = reprinted in the 1964 Four Square paperback; F2 = reprinted in the 1964 Four Square paperback From Other Worlds.

- "Introduction" (August Derleth) (W)
- "The Star" (David H. Keller, M.D.) (F1)
- "The Man from Outside" (Jack Williamson) (from Astounding Science Fiction, March 1951) (F2)
- "Beachhead" (Clifford Simak) (from Fantastic Adventures, July 1951) (W, F1)
- "The Years Draw Nigh" (Lester del Rey) (from Astounding Science Fiction, October 1951) (W, B, F1)
- "Metamorphosite" (Eric Frank Russell) (from Astounding Science Fiction, December 1946) (W, B, F1)
- "The Ordeal of Professor Klein" (L. Sprague de Camp) (from Science Fiction Adventures, November 1952) (F1)
- "Repetition" (A. E. van Vogt) (from Astounding Science-Fiction], April 1940) (B, F1)
- "Breeds There a Man...?" (Isaac Asimov) (from Astounding Science Fiction, June 1951 (W, B, F2)
- "Meteor" (John Beynon) (from Amazing Stories, March 1941) (F2)
- "And the Walls Came Tumbling Down" (John Wyndham) (from Startling Stories, May 1951) (W, B, F2)
- "The Blinding Shadows" (Donald Wandrei) (from Astounding Stories, May 1934) (W, B, F2)
- "The Metamorphosis of Earth" (Clark Ashton Smith) (from Weird Tales, September 1951) (W, F2)
- "The Ambassadors from Venus" (Kendell Foster Crossen) (from Planet Stories, March 1952) (F2)
- "To People a New World" (from Blue Book, November 1950 (Nelson Bond) (B, F1)

== Reception ==
P. Schuyler Miller, writing in the November 1953 and April 1954 issues of Astrounding Science Fiction, reported Beachhead to be "a well-done theme collection," saying it was "better than anyone would have thought could still be dredged out of the old files."

The anthology was also reviewed by Robert A. W. Lowndes in Dynamic Science Fiction, June 1953, an anonymous reviewer in Weird Tales, January 1953, Groff Conklin in Galaxy Science Fiction, February 1953, Herbert J. Campbell in Authentic Science Fiction Monthly #47, July 1954, Ken Slater [as by Kenneth F. Slater] in Nebula Science Fiction number 9, 1954, and Lynn E. Catoe in UFOs and Related Subjects: An Annotated Bibliography, 1978.

== Sources ==
- Content, William G. "Index to Science Fiction Anthologies and Collections". Archived from the original on 22 December 2007.
- Tuck, Donald H. (1974). The Encyclopedia of Science Fiction and Fantasy. Chicago: Advent. pp. 138–139. ISBN 0-911682-20-1.
