= From Other Worlds =

1964 anthology edited by August Derleth

- Cover of the first edition
- Editor: August Derleth
- Language: English
- Genre: Science fiction short stories
- Publisher: Four Square Books
- Publication date: 1964
- Publication place: United Kingdom
- Media type: Print (paperback)
- Pages: 184

From Other Worlds is an anthology of science fiction stories edited by American writer August Derleth. It was first published by Four Square Books in 1964. The anthology contains seven stories from Derleth's earlier anthology, Beachheads in Space. The stories had originally appeared in the magazines Astounding Stories, Amazing Stories, Startling Stories, Weird Tales and Planet Stories.

== Contents ==
- "The Man from Outside", by Jack Williamson
- "Breeds There a Man...?", by Isaac Asimov
- "Meteor", by John Beynon
- "And the Walls Came Tumbling Down", by John Wyndham
- "Blinding Shadows", by Donald Wandrei
- "The Metamorphosis of Earth", by Clark Ashton Smith
- "The Ambassadors from Venus", by Kendell F. Crossen

== Sources ==
- Contento, William G. "Index to Science Fiction Anthologies and Collections". Archived from the original on 2007-12-22.
- Tuck, Donald H. (1974). The Encyclopedia of Science Fiction and Fantasy. Chicago: Advent. pp. 138–139. ISBN 0-911682-20-1.
