= Lonesome Places =

1962 collection of short stories by August Derleth

- Dust-jacket photograph by Clarence J. Laughlin, lettering and design by Gary Gore.
- Author: August Derleth
- Cover artist: photograph by Clarence J. Laughlin, lettering and design by Gary Gore
- Language: English
- Genre: Fantasy, Horror
- Publisher: Arkham House
- Publication date: 1962
- Publication place: United States
- Media type: Print (hardback)
- Pages: 198

Lonesome Places is a collection of fantasy and horror short stories by American author August Derleth. It was released in 1962 by Arkham House in an edition of 2,201 copies and was Derleth's fifth collection of weird tales. The collection contains the stories that Derleth believed to be his best of the preceding 15 years.

== Contents ==
Lonesome Places contains the following tales:

- "The Lonesome Place"
- "Pikeman"
- "Kingsridge 214"
- "The Ebony Stick"
- "'Sexton, Sexton, in the Wall'"
- "The Closing Door"
- "A Room in a House"
- "Potts' Triumph"
- "Twilight Play"
- "The Disc Recorder"
- "Hector"
- "'Who Shall I Say is Calling?'"
- "The Extra Child"
- "The Place in the Woods"
- "Hallowe'en for Mr. Faulkner"
- "House—With Ghost"
- "The Slayers and the Slain"
- "The Dark Boy"

== Sources ==
- Jaffery, Sheldon (1989). The Arkham House Companion. Mercer Island, WA: Starmont House, Inc. pp. 61–62. ISBN 1-55742-005-X.
- Chalker, Jack L.; Mark Owings (1998). The Science-Fantasy Publishers: A Bibliographic History, 1923-1998. Westminster, MD and Baltimore: Mirage Press, Ltd. p. 39.
- Joshi, S.T. (1999). Sixty Years of Arkham House: A History and Bibliography. Sauk City, WI: Arkham House. p. 76. ISBN 0-87054-176-5.
- Nielsen, Leon (2004). Arkham House Books: A Collector's Guide. Jefferson, NC and London: McFarland & Company, Inc. pp. 84–85. ISBN 0-7864-1785-4.
