= Norman Adams (American artist) =

American artist (1933–2014)

Norman Adams (October 3, 1933 – July 4, 2014) was an American commercial artist and illustrator.

== Biography ==
Born in Walla Walla, Washington, Norman Adams began to draw and paint when he was still a child. He collected pictures from every type of magazine and book he could find and then found ways of improving them.

He studied art at the Los Angeles Art Center School in the early 1950s. While he was in Los Angeles he spent months painting a portfolio in which he used his trompe-l'œil realism to convince the managers of the largest illustration agencies in NY that he could do what no other artist/illustrator could. The three largest agencies in New York wanted to hire him. He chose to work for the Charles E Cooper Studio. While Adams was working in NY he met his idol Robert Fawcett at a Society of Illustrators exhibition.

Adams' illustrations included works for Reader's Digest, Boys' Life, Harpers, National Geographic, TV Guide, Saturday Evening Post, Argosy, Sports Afield, Field and Stream, Business Week, Cabela's, and other paperback covers. He also authored a textbook now in its 30th Edition, Drawing Animals. When the magazines started to fail the Charles E Cooper Studio had to downscale. This prompted Norman Adams to join an elite group of illustrators at Artists Associates.

In 1980 Lenox hired him to do a very limited edition Lenox Collection of 12 unique plates that were released in 1982 called The American Wildlife Plates by Norman Adams. In the mid-1980s, Adams was given an opportunity to paint for the 1988 Minnesota Wildlife Art Show. His work was a life-sized Golden Eagle in a Grand Canyon setting. For years he sold his wildlife and animal paintings in galleries in Scottsdale, Arizona, and Jackson Hole, Wyoming.
