= The Outer Reaches =

1951 anthology edited by August Derleth

- Dust-jacket from the first edition
- Editor: August Derleth
- Language: English
- Genre: Science fiction
- Publisher: Pellegrini & Cudahy
- Publication date: 1951
- Publication place: United States
- Media type: Print (hardback)
- Pages: 342 pp

The Outer Reaches is an anthology of science fiction stories edited by August Derleth. It was first published by Pellegrini & Cudahy in 1951. The stories had originally appeared in the magazines Fantasy & Science Fiction, Astounding Stories, Blue Book, Maclean's, Worlds Beyond, Amazing Stories, Fantastic Adventures, Thrilling Wonder Stories and Galaxy Science Fiction or in the anthology Invasion from Mars.

According to Derleth, the stories were selected as "favorites" by the authors involved, who provide short explanations for their choices. P. Schuyler Miller, although noting the stories "aren't all deathless prose," characterized them as "examples of the editor's good taste in writers and the authors' good taste in the difficult job of screening their own writings."

== Contents ==
- Foreword, by August Derleth
- "Interloper", by Poul Anderson
- "Death Sentence", by Isaac Asimov
- "This Is the Land", by Nelson S. Bond
- "Ylla", by Ray Bradbury
- "The Green Cat", by Cleve Cartmill
- "Git Along!", by L. Sprague de Camp
- "Service First", by David H. Keller, M.D.
- "Shock", by Henry Kuttner
- "The Ship Sails at Midnight", by Fritz Leiber
- "The Power", by Murray Leinster
- "The Critters", by Frank Belknap Long
- "Pardon My Mistake", by Fletcher Pratt
- "Good Night, Mr. James", by Clifford D. Simak
- "The Plutonian Drug", by Clark Ashton Smith
- "Farewell to Eden, by Theodore Sturgeon
- "Co-Operate—or Else!", by A. E. van Vogt
- "Finality Unlimited", by Donald Wandrei

== Sources ==
- Contento, William G. "Index to Science Fiction Anthologies and Collections". Archived from the original on 2007-03-16.
- Tuck, Donald H. (1974). The Encyclopedia of Science Fiction and Fantasy. Chicago: Advent. p. 139. ISBN 0-911682-20-1.
