= John Metcalfe (writer) =

English teacher and novelist (1891–1965)

- Born: 6 October 1891; Heacham, Norfolk, England
- Died: 31 July 1965 (aged 73); England
- Occupation: Writer
- Writing career
- Period: 1920s through 1950s
- Genres: Science fiction, Horror, Weird Fiction

William John Metcalfe (6 October 1891 – 31 July 1965) was an English teacher, short story writer and novelist from Norfolk, who twice emigrated to the United States.

== Early life and education ==
John Metcalfe was born in Heacham, Norfolk, on 6 October 1891. He studied philosophy at the University of London, graduating in 1913. He then taught in Paris until 1914.

== War and teaching ==
During the First World War, Metcalfe served in the Royal Naval Division, the Royal Naval Air Service, and then in the Royal Air Force.

After the war, Metcalfe taught for five years at Highgate Junior School in London, and began writing. His first book, The Smoking Leg and Other Stories, published in 1925, contains several stories, including the title story "The Bad Lands", "Nightmare Jack" and "The Double Admiral". After its publication, he abandoned teaching for writing full-time.

== Emigration ==
Metcalfe emigrated to the United States in 1928, where he wrote Arm's Length while serving as a barge captain on the East River. On 17 March 1930, he married the American novelist Evelyn Scott. His second collection, Judas and Other Stories features several horror stories. They include "Mortmain", about a man who believes he is being haunted by the ghost of his wife's first husband.

After service in World War II in the British Royal Air Force, Metcalfe taught in schools in Dorset and Hampstead before returning to the United States, where he was a teacher in Connecticut and New York.

In the 1950s, Metcalfe discussed with August Derleth the possibility of having a third collection of his fiction published by Arkham House. This collection (to be entitled The Feasting Dead and other Stories) never appeared, but Arkham published The Feasting Dead as a standalone novella. Derleth also included several Metcalfe stories in his anthologies.

== Death in UK ==
Evelyn died in August 1963, after heart disease, a lung tumour and mental illness. He was subsequently hospitalised for a nervous breakdown. On his release in October 1964 he returned to England, where he died on 31 July 1965, after a fall.

== Horror, novels and poetry ==
Although Metcalfe is best known as a writer of horror stories, he also wrote novels and poetry. T. E. D. Klein described him as a "writer of subtle, finely crafted supernatural tales, many of them about lonely misfits out of step with their times". Brian Stableford noted how his stories "build up a unique sense of unease".

== Works ==
=== Chapbooks ===
- Brenner's Boy, 1932, White Owl Press

=== Novels ===
- Spring Darkness, 1928, Constable (US title: Mrs Condover)
- Arm's Length, 1930, Constable
- Foster-Girl, 1936, Constable (US title: Sally)
- All Friends Are Strangers, 1944, Nicholson & Watson
- The Feasting Dead, 1954, Arkham House (reprinted 2014 by Valancourt Books)
- My Cousin Geoffrey, 1956, MacDonald & Co.

=== Collections ===
- The Smoking Leg, and Other Stories, London: Jarrolds, 1925
- Judas, and Other Stories, London: Constable, 1931
- Nightmare Jack and Other Tales, Ashcroft, British Columbia: Ash-Tree Press, 1998
