= Edward Lucas White =

American author and poet (1866–1934)

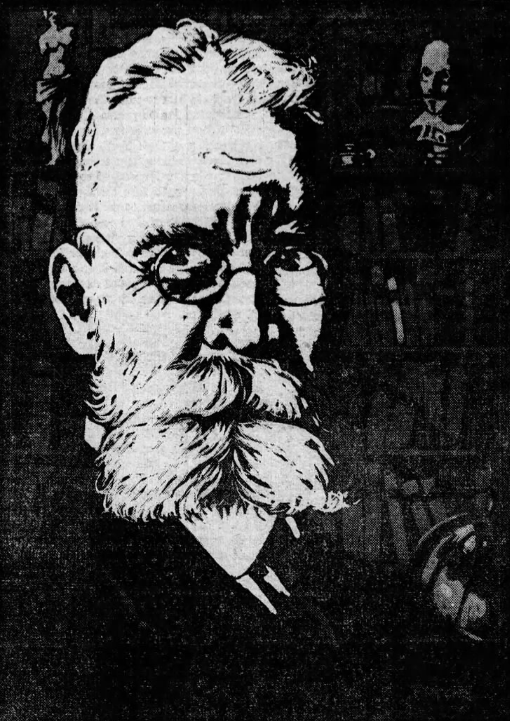
- Caricature of White in 1927
- Born: May 11, 1866; Bergen County, New Jersey, U.S.
- Died: March 30, 1934 (aged 67); Baltimore, Maryland, U.S.
- Education: Johns Hopkins University
- Spouse: Agnes Gerry (died 1927)

Edward Lucas White (May 11, 1866 – March 30, 1934) was an American writer and poet.

== Life ==
Born in Bergen County, New Jersey, the son of Thomas Hurley White (1838–1902) and Kate Butler (Lucas) White, he attended Johns Hopkins University in Baltimore, where he lived for the rest of his life. From 1915 until his retirement in 1930 he was a teacher at the University School for Boys in Baltimore.

He published a number of historical novels, including El Supremo: A Romance of the Great Dictator of Paraguay (1916), The Unwilling Vestal (1918), Andivius Hedulio (1921) and Helen (1926), but he is best remembered for fantasy horror stories such as "The House of the Nightmare" and "Lukundoo" that were based on his own nightmares. Two collections of his short fiction were published in his lifetime, The Song of the Sirens (1919) and Lukundoo and Other Stories (1927).

"Lukundoo", White's most frequently anthologized story, is the tale of an American explorer in a remote section of Africa who incurs the wrath of the local witch doctor, who casts a spell on him. Dozens of sore pustules erupt all over the explorer's body. As these develop, it becomes clear that each sore is actually a sort of homunculus: a tiny African man, emerging head-first from within the explorer's flesh. He is able to terminate the development of individual homunculi by beheading them as they develop, but there are too many for him to defeat them all. When other explorers attempt to help, he pleads with them to let him die, accepting his fate as a taunting homunculus pulls itself from the flesh of his upper right chest.

As his extensive "selected bibliography on the history of Paraguay during the days of 'El Supremo,' Jose Gaspar Rodriguez de Francia" and brief Preface point out, White took great pains to make his historical novel El Supremo quite realistic and historically accurate. As he writes in the Preface: "The minor characters are mostly also historical. Only Hawthorne, Cecelia and Beltran, the Mayorgas and the Velardes are fictitious." He then goes on to list by name about two dozen characters who "are as authentic as their names" along with another two dozen or so where he admits "The first names of these characters, however, it has been found advisable to alter", mainly because there were just too many "christened Juan or Jose", but "in a romance any one would become hopelessly confused." He admits to changing the English Dr. Parlett's name to Tom for effect and gave names to two characters whose names have been lost in the histories: El Pelado's and El Zapo's.

Two posthumous collections of his fiction have been published by Midnight House: The House of the Nightmare (1998) edited by John Pelan and Sesta and Other Strange Stories (2001) edited by Lee Weinstein. The latter contains mostly previously unpublished and uncollected material.

During 1885 White began a utopian science fiction novel, Plus Ultra. He destroyed the first draft and started over in 1901, then worked on it for most of the rest of his life. The resulting monumental work—estimated by one critic at 500,000 words—remains unpublished, although a portion of it was released separately in 1920 as the novella From Behind the Stars.

On March 30, 1934, seven years to the day after the death of his wife, Agnes Gerry, he committed suicide by gas inhalation in the bathroom of his Baltimore home. His last book, Matrimony (1932) was a memoir of his happy marriage to her.

== Bibliography ==
=== Novels ===
- El Supremo: A Romance of the Great Dictator of Paraguay (1916), copyright renewed by Ethyl White in 1944 and republished, with an introduction by Wayne G. Broehl Jr., 1967 (E.P. Dutton & Co., Inc.)
- The Unwilling Vestal: A Tale of Rome Under the Caesars (1918)
- Andivius Hedulio: Adventures of a Roman Nobleman in the Days of the Empire (1921)
- Helen (1926)

=== Short story collections ===
- The Song of the Sirens (1919)
  - "The Song of the Sirens", "Iarbas", "The Right Man", "Dodona", "The Elephant's Ear", "The Fasces", "The Swimmers", "The Skewbald Panther", "Disvola", "The Flambeau Bracket".
- Lukundoo and Other Stories (1927)
  - "Lukundoo", "Floki's Blade", "The Picture Puzzle", "The Snout", "Alfandega 49a", "The Message on the Slate", "Amina", "The Pig-Skin Belt", "The House of the Nightmare", "Sorcery Island".

=== History ===
- Why Rome Fell (1927)

=== Autobiography ===
- Matrimony (1932)

=== Further reading ===
- Barrett, Mike. "Narratives Out of Nightmare: Edward Lucas White"". Wormwood (Spring 2009); expanded version in Barrett's Doors to Elsewhere. Cheadle, Staffs, UK: The Alchemy Press, 2013, pp. 63-74.
- Joshi, S.T. "Edward Lucas White: Dream and Reality" in Joshi, The Evolution of the Weird Tale. New York: Hippocampus Press. ISBN 0974878928 (2004), 39–45.
- Searles, A. Langley. "Fantasy and Outré Themes in the Short Fiction of Edward Lucas White and Henry S. Whitehead" in Douglas Robillard, ed. American Supernatural Fiction: From Edith Wharton to the Weird Tales Writers. New York: Garland,ISBN 0815317352 (1996).
