= Henry S. Whitehead =

American novelist (1882-1932)

- Born: March 5, 1882; Elizabeth, New Jersey, United States
- Died: November 23, 1932 (aged 50); Dunedin, Florida, United States
- Occupations: Short story writer, rector
- Writing career
- Period: 1905–1932
- Genres: Horror, Fantasy

Henry St. Clair Whitehead (March 5, 1882 – November 23, 1932) was an American Episcopal minister and author of horror, some non fiction and fantasy fiction.

== Biography ==
Henry S. Whitehead was born in Elizabeth, New Jersey, on March 5, 1882, and graduated from Harvard University in 1904 (in the same class as Franklin D. Roosevelt). As a young man he led an active and worldly life in the first decade of the 20th century, playing football at Harvard University, editing a Reform democratic newspaper in Port Chester, New York, and serving as commissioner of athletics for the AAU.

He later attended Berkeley Divinity School in Middletown, Connecticut, and in 1912 he was ordained a deacon in the Episcopal Church. During 1912-1913 he worked as a clergyman in Torrington, Connecticut. From 1913 to 1917 he served as rector in Christ's Church, Middletown, Connecticut. From 1918 to 1919 he was Pastor of the Children, Church of St. Mary the Virgin, New York City.

He served as Archdeacon of the Virgin Islands from 1921 to 1929. While there, living on the island of St. Croix, Whitehead gathered the material he was to use in his tales of the supernatural. A correspondent and friend of H. P. Lovecraft, Whitehead published stories from 1924 onward in Adventure, Black Mask, Strange Tales, and especially Weird Tales. In his introduction to the collection Jumbee, R. H. Barlow would later describe Whitehead as a member of "the serious Weird Tales school". Many of Whitehead's stories are set on the Virgin Islands and draw on the history and folklore of the region. Several of these stories are narrated by Gerald Canevin, a New Englander living on the islands and a fictional stand-in for Whitehead. Whitehead's supernatural fiction was partially modelled on the work of Edward Lucas White and William Hope Hodgson. Whitehead's "The Great Circle" (1932) is a lost-race tale with sword and sorcery elements.

In later life, Whitehead lived in Dunedin, Florida, as rector of the Church of the Good Shepherd and a leader of a boys' group there. H. P. Lovecraft was a particular friend as well as a correspondent of Whitehead's, visiting him at his Dunedin home for several weeks in 1931. Lovecraft recorded in his letters that he entertained the boys with readings of his stories such as "The Cats of Ulthar". Lovecraft said of Whitehead: "He has nothing of the musty cleric about him; but dresses in sports clothes, swears like a he-man on occasion, and is an utter stranger to bigotry or priggishness of any sort."

Whitehead suffered from a long-term gastric problem, but an account of his death by his assistant suggests he died from a fall or a stroke or both. He died late in 1932, but few of his readers learned about this until an announcement and brief profile, by H. P. Lovecraft, appeared in the March 1933 Weird Tales, issued in Feb 1933. Whitehead was greatly mourned and missed by lovers of weird fiction at his death.

R. H. Barlow collected many of Whitehead's letters, planning to publish a volume of them; but this never appeared, although Barlow did contribute the introduction to Whitehead's Jumbee and Other Uncanny Tales (1944).

== Reception ==
Whitehead is culturally important for his sustained introduction of voodoo into popular culture, via his stories.

Lovecraft expressed admiration for Whitehead's work, describing Whitehead's work as "weird fiction of a subtle, realistic and quietly potent sort" and praising Whitehead's story The Passing of a God as "perhaps representing the peak of his creative genius".

In a letter to August Derleth, Algernon Blackwood included Whitehead on a list of writers that he admired.

His work is still highly regarded today by writers and critics, and Stefan Dziemianowicz describes Whitehead's West Indian (mostly Virgin Islands) tales as "virtually unmatched for the vividness with which they convey the awe and mystery of their exotic locale".

== Works ==
=== Short fiction ===
- "The Intarsia Box" (1923) Adventure
- "The Wonder-Phone" (1923) People’s Magazine
- "Christabel" (1923) Hutchinson’s Adventure-Story Magazine
- "The Door" (1924) Weird Tales
- "Tea Leaves" (1924) Weird Tales
- "The Wonderful Thing" (1925) Weird Tales
- "The Thin Match" (1925) Weird Tales
- "The Cunning of the Serpent" (1925) Adventure
- "Sea Change" (1925) Weird Tales
- "The Gladstone Bag" (1925)The Black Mask
- "The Fireplace" (1925) Weird Tales
- "The Projection of Armand Dubois" (1926) Weird Tales
- "Jumbee" (1926) Weird Tales
- "Across the Gulf" (1926) Weird Tales
- "Gahd Laff!" (1926) The Black Mask 1926
- "The Shadows" (1927) Weird Tales
- "West India Lights" (1927) West India Lights
- "The Left Eye" (1927) Weird Tales
- "Obi in the Caribbean" (1927) West India Lights
- "The Cult of the Skull" (1928) Weird Tales
- "The Return of Milt Drennan" (1929) Mystery Stories
- "The Lips" (1929) Weird Tales
- "Sweet Grass" (1929) Weird Tales
- "Black Tancrède" (1929) Weird Tales

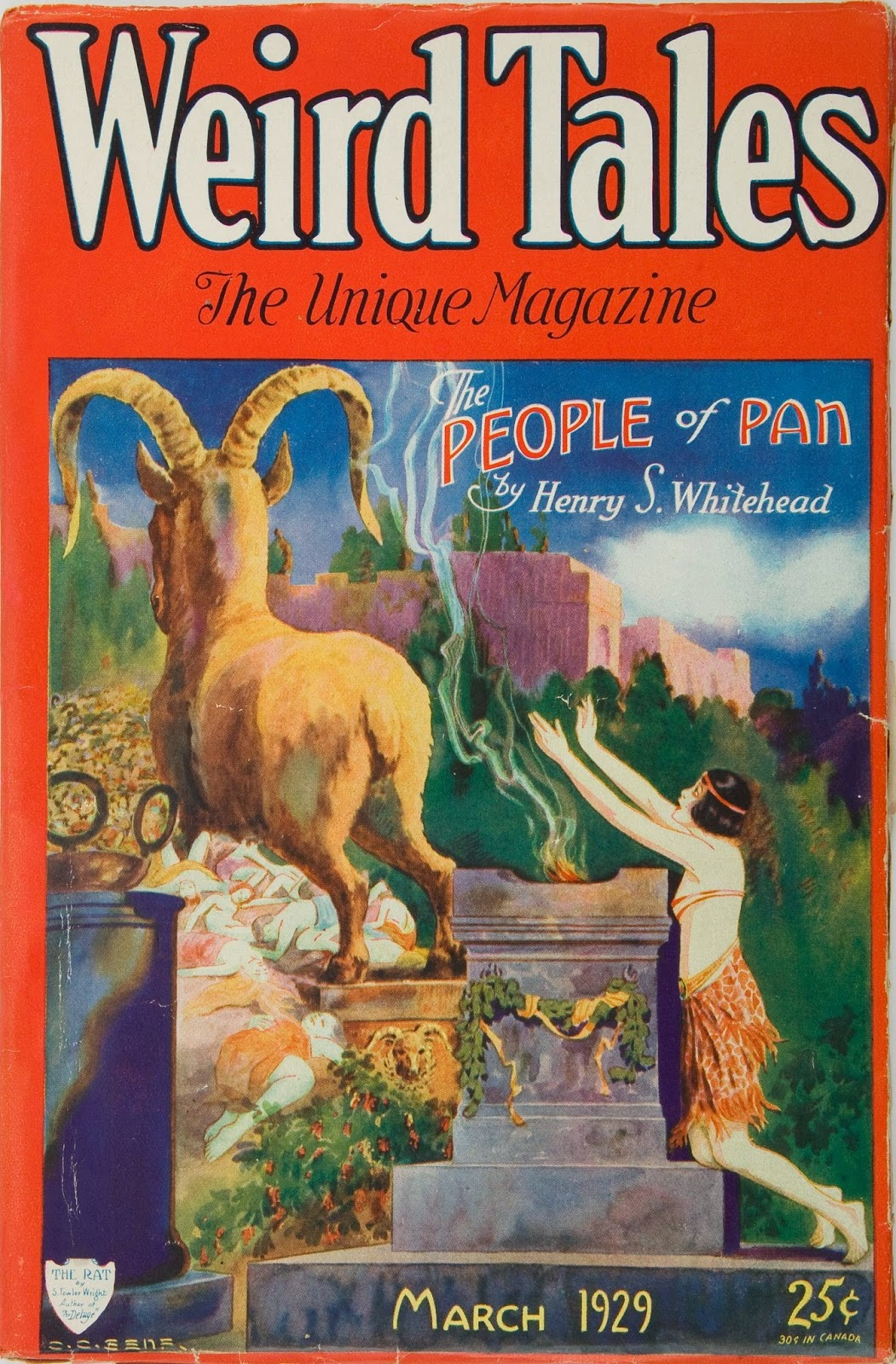
Whitehead's novelette "The People of Pan" was the cover story in the March 1929 Weird Tales

- "The People of Pan" (1929) Weird Tales
- "The Tabernacle" (1930) Weird Tales
- "The Shut Room" (1930) Weird Tales
- "Machiavelli—Salesman" (1931) Popular Fiction Magazine
- "The Passing of a God" (1931) Weird Tales
- "The Trap" (1931) (with H.P. Lovecraft) Strange Tales
- "The Tree-Man" (1931) Weird Tales
- "Black Terror" (1931) Weird Tales
- "Hill Drums" (1931) Weird Tales
- "The Black Beast" (1931) Adventure
- "Cassius" (1931) Strange Tales (based on an idea by H. P. Lovecraft)
- "Mrs. Lorriquer" (1932) Weird Tales
- "No Eye-Witnesses" (1932) Weird Tales
- "Seven Turns in a Hangman's Rope" (1932) Adventure
- "The Moon-Dial" (1932) Strange Tales
- "The Great Circle" (1932) Strange Tales
- "Sea-Tiger" (1932) Strange Tales
- "The Chadbourne Episode" (1933) Weird Tales
- "The Napier Limousine" (1933) Strange Tales
- "Ruby the Kid" (1933) Nickel Western
- "Scar-Tissue" (1946) Amazing Stories
- "The Ravel 'Pavane'" (1946) West India Lights
- "Williamson" (1946) West India Lights - written 1910, first published posthumously
- "--In Case of Disaster Only" (1946) West India Lights
- "Bothon" (1946) (with H.P. Lovecraft) West India Lights

=== Poetry ===
- "Litrachoor," The Writer, August 1926

=== Non-fiction ===
- "Editorial Prejudice Against the Occult," The Writer, October 1922
- letter in The Camp-Fire, Adventure, November 10, 1923
- "Certain Mechanical Aids for the Writer," The Writer, March 1926
- "The Happy Ending," The Writer, July 1926
- "The Occult Story" in The Free-Lance Writer's Handbook (1926)
- ""Two Religions" of Anglicanism," The Commonweal, February 16, 1927
- "A Few from the Chest," The Writer, October 1927
- "The 'Project' Method," Writer's Digest, January 1928
- "Scrapped Stories," Writer's Digest, April 1928
- "Negro Dialect of the Virgin Islands," American Speech, Vol. 7, No. 3., February 1932

=== Collections ===
- Jumbee and Other Uncanny Tales (1944)
- West India Lights (1946)
- Passing of a God and Other Stories (2007), Ash-Tree Press, edited by Douglas A. Anderson and Stefan Dziemianowicz.
- Tales of the Jumbee: and Other Wonders of the West Indies (2009), Wildside Press
- Voodoo Tales: The Ghost Stories of Henry S. Whitehead (2012), Wordsworth Editions.

=== Novels for boys ===
- Pinkie at Camp Cherokee (1931, Putnam's)

== Sources ==
- Associated Press, Dunedin, November 23, 1932. "Roosevelt's Classmate at Harvard Dies in Dunedin." Tampa Tribune, November 24, 1932. Obituary for "Rev. Dr. Henry Sinclair [sic] Whitehead, 50, author, traveler and lecturer...died here today."
- Chalker, Jack L.; Mark Owings (1998). The Science-Fantasy Publishers: A Bibliographic History, 1923-1998. Westminster, MD and Baltimore: Mirage Press, Ltd. p. 27.
- Jaffery, Sheldon (1989). The Arkham House Companion. Mercer Island, WA: Starmont House, Inc. p. 8. ISBN 1-55742-005-X.
- Joshi, S. T. (1999). Sixty Years of Arkham House: A History and Bibliography. Sauk City, WI: Arkham House. pp. 26–27. ISBN 0-87054-176-5.
- Nielsen, Leon (2004). Arkham House Books: A Collector's Guide. Jefferson, NC and London: McFarland & Company, Inc. pp. 51–52. ISBN 0-7864-1785-4.
- Ruber, Peter (2000). Arkham's Masters of Horror. Sauk City, WI: Arkham House. pp. 154–158. ISBN 0-87054-177-3.
- H. P. Lovecraft. "In Memoriam: Henry St. Clair Whitehead" (Weird Tales, March 1933) (abridged). Full version in a letter by Lovecraft to E. Hoffman Price, Dec 7, 1932 (ms, John Hay Library; printed in part in Lovecraft, Selected Letters 4, 116–117).
- R. Alain Everts, Henry St. Clair Whitehead (Strange Co, 1975).
- A. Langley Searles, "Fantasy and Outre Themes in the Short Fiction of Edward Lucas White and Henry S. Whitehead", in American Supernatural Fiction, ed. Douglas Robillard (NY: Garland, 1996), 59-76.
