= Claudius (disambiguation) =

Claudius (Tiberius Claudius Caesar Augustus Germanicus; 10 BC – 54 AD) was the fourth Roman Emperor, reigning from AD 41 to his death.

Claudius, a name of Latin origin meaning crippled, may also refer to:

== People ==
=== Ancient world ===
- Any member of the family of Claudii; see Claudia (gens)
- Saint Claudius (disambiguation), the name of several Christian saints
- Claudius Aelianus (c. 175 – c. 235), Roman author and teacher of rhetoric
- Claudius Gothicus, also known as Marcus Aurelius Claudius or Claudius II, Roman Emperor from 268 to 270
- Claudius Silvanus (died 355), Roman general and usurper

=== Middle Ages ===
- Claudius, Duke of Lusitania, late sixth century Hispano-Roman Catholic dux (duke) of Lusitania and general
- Claudius of Turin (fl. 810–827), bishop of Turin, teacher of iconoclasm
- Claudius Clavus (1388–?), Danish geographer

=== Later ===
- Gelawdewos, known as Claudius in English, mid-16th-century Emperor of Ethiopia
- Claudius Salmasius, Latin name of Claude Saumaise (1588–1653), French classical scholar
- Hendrik Claudius, (c. 1655–1697), painter and apothecary
- Claudius Smith (1736–1779), a notorious British Loyalist guerrilla leader in the American Revolution
- Matthias Claudius (1740–1815), German poet famous for Death and the Maiden
- Claudius Buchanan (1766–1815), Scottish theologian, ordained minister of the Church of England, and missionary
- Claudius Crozet (1789–1864), French-American educator and civil engineer
- Claudius B. Grant (1835–1921), American jurist
- Eduard Claudius (1911–1976), German writer and diplomat
- Claudius Dornier (1884–1969), German airplane builder and founder of Dornier GmbH
- Hermann Claudius (1878–1980), German writer and poet, great-grandson of Matthias
- Claudius Vermilye (1928–2018), American defrocked Episcopal priest and child pornographer

== Other uses ==
- 7117 Claudius, asteroid
- King Claudius, Hamlet's uncle in Shakespeare's play Hamlet
- Claudius (turtle), a genus of mud turtles
- Claudius, a residential suburb of Centurion, South Africa that is closely associated with Laudium
- A typeface created by Rudolf Koch

== See also ==
- Cladius (disambiguation)
- Clausius
- I, Claudius (disambiguation)
- List of Roman emperors, as several emperors had "Claudius" in their full names
