= I, Claudius (disambiguation) =

I, Claudius is a 1934 historical novel by Robert Graves.

I, Claudius may also refer to:

- I, Claudius (film), an unfinished 1937 adaptation of the novel
- I, Claudius (TV series), a 1976 BBC television serial based on the novel and its sequel
- I, Claudius, a 1972 theatre adaptation which starred David Warner
- I, Claudius (radio), a 2010 BBC radio series based on the novel and its sequel
- I, Claudius (opera), a 2019 trilogy by Igor Escudero

== See also ==
- I, Claudia
- I, Robot
