= Cladius =

Cladius may refer to:

- Cladius (sawfly), a genus of sawflies in the family Tenthredinidae
- Cladius Detlev Fritzsch (1765–1841), Danish painter
- Cladius Labib (1868–1918), Egyptian Egyptologist

== See also ==
- Claudius (disambiguation)
