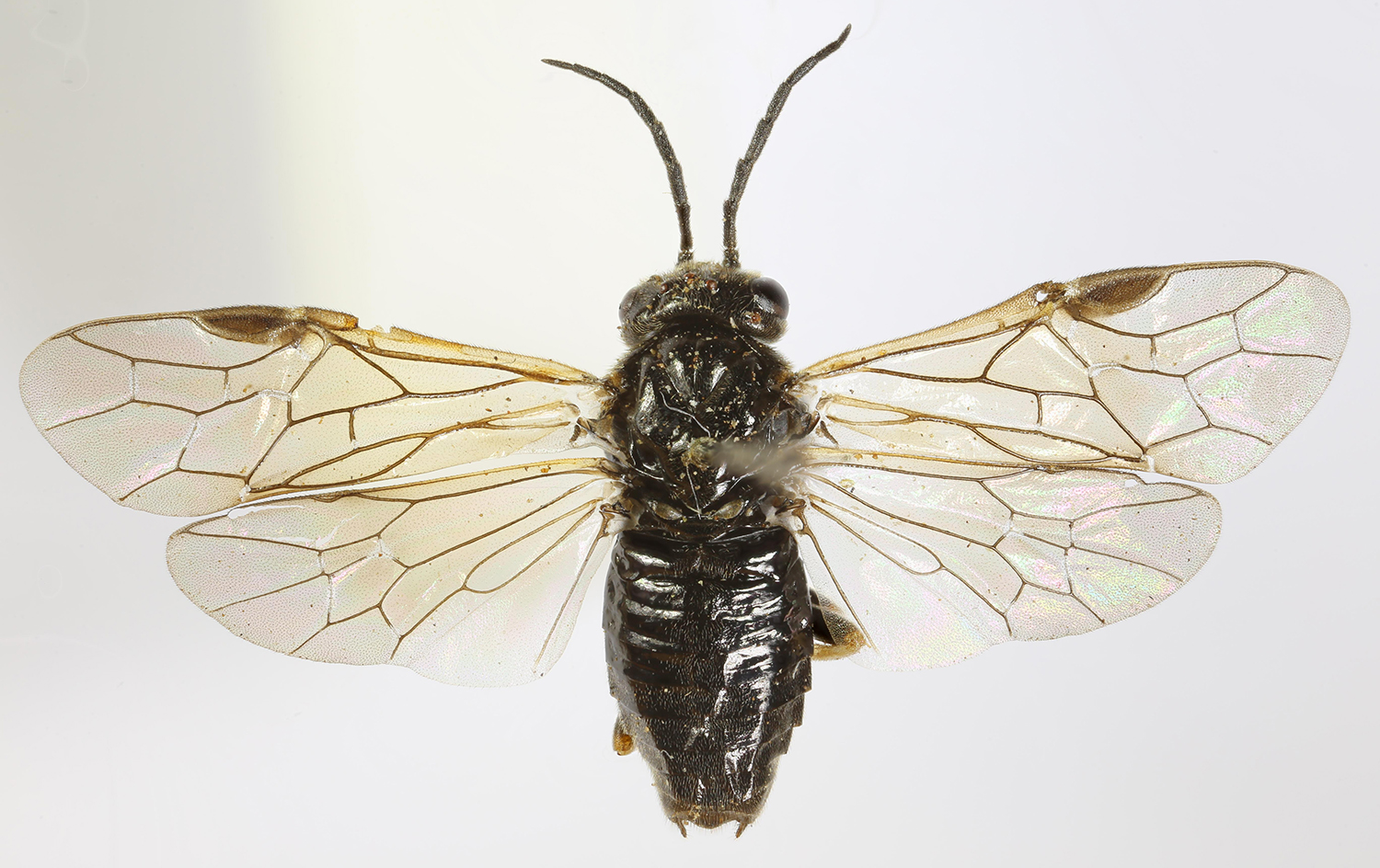
- Cladius pectinicornis , Graig-fechan, North Wales

Scientific classification
- Domain: Eukaryota
- Kingdom: Animalia
- Phylum: Arthropoda
- Class: Insecta
- Order: Hymenoptera
- Suborder: Symphyta
- Family: Tenthredinidae
- Genus: Cladius
- Species: C. pectinicornis

Binomial name
- Cladius pectinicornis (Geoffroy, 1785)

= Cladius pectinicornis =

Species of sawfly

Cladius pectinicornis is a Palearctic species of sawfly.
