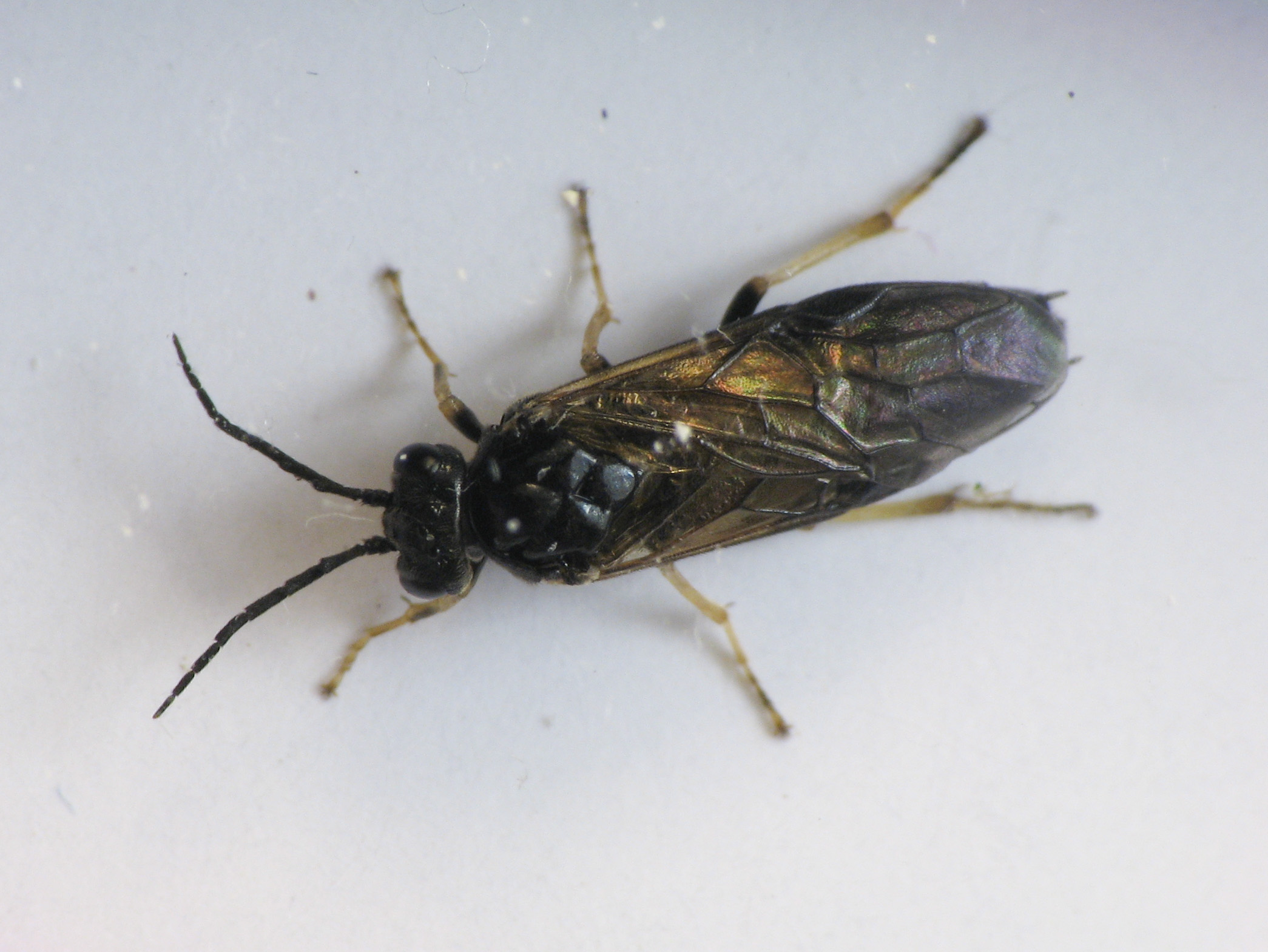
- Adult female

Scientific classification
- Kingdom: Animalia
- Phylum: Arthropoda
- Clade: Pancrustacea
- Class: Insecta
- Order: Hymenoptera
- Suborder: Symphyta
- Family: Tenthredinidae
- Genus: Cladius
- Species: C. difformis

Binomial name
- Cladius difformis (Panzer, 1799)

= Cladius difformis =

Species of sawfly

Cladius difformis, the bristly rose slug, is a species of common sawfly in the family Tenthredinidae. They go through several generations a year. The larvae can cause damage to roses, raspberries and strawberries. The species is native to the Palaearctic, but was probably accidentally introduced in the Nearctic.

== Life cycle ==
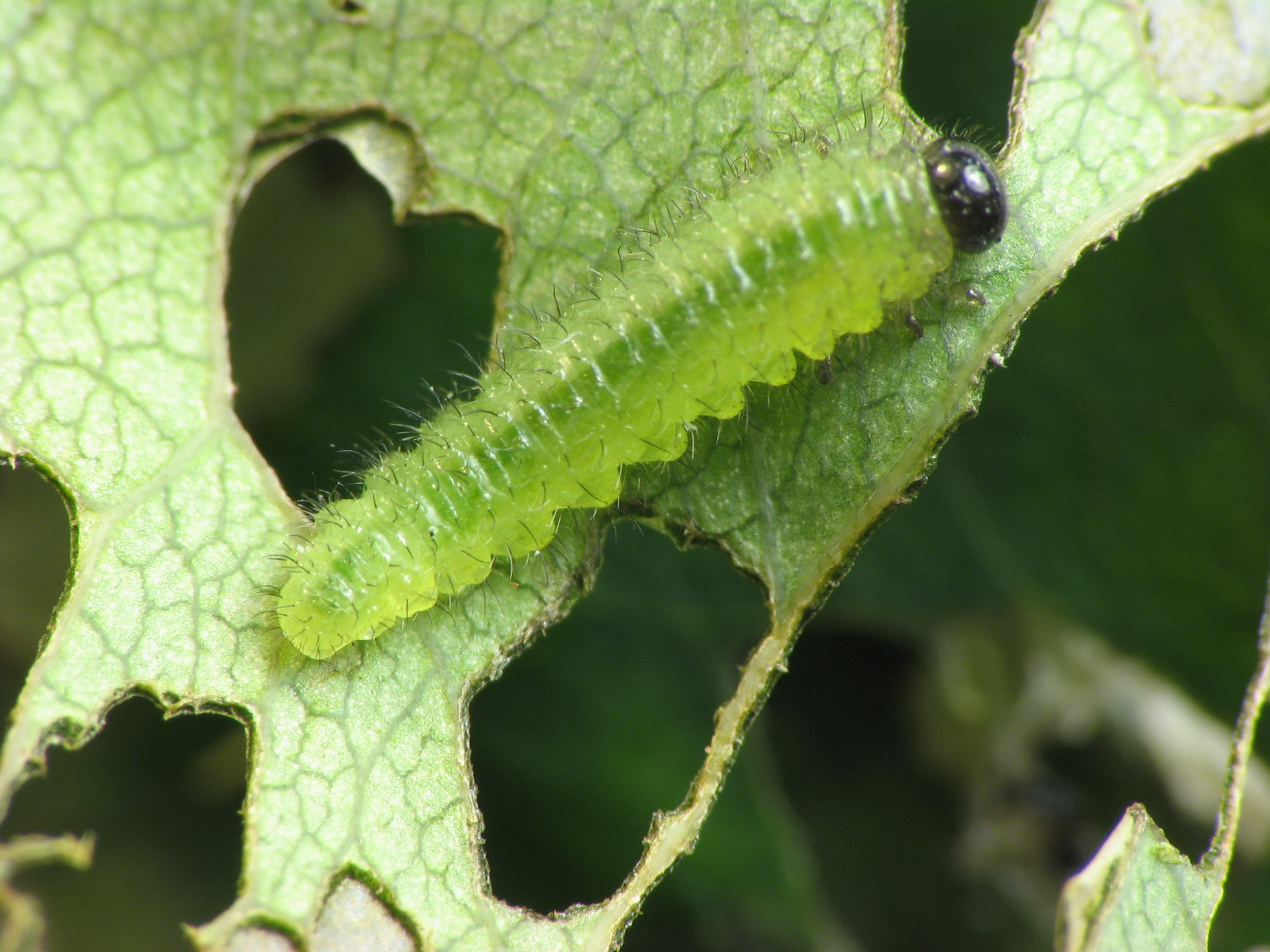
Larva

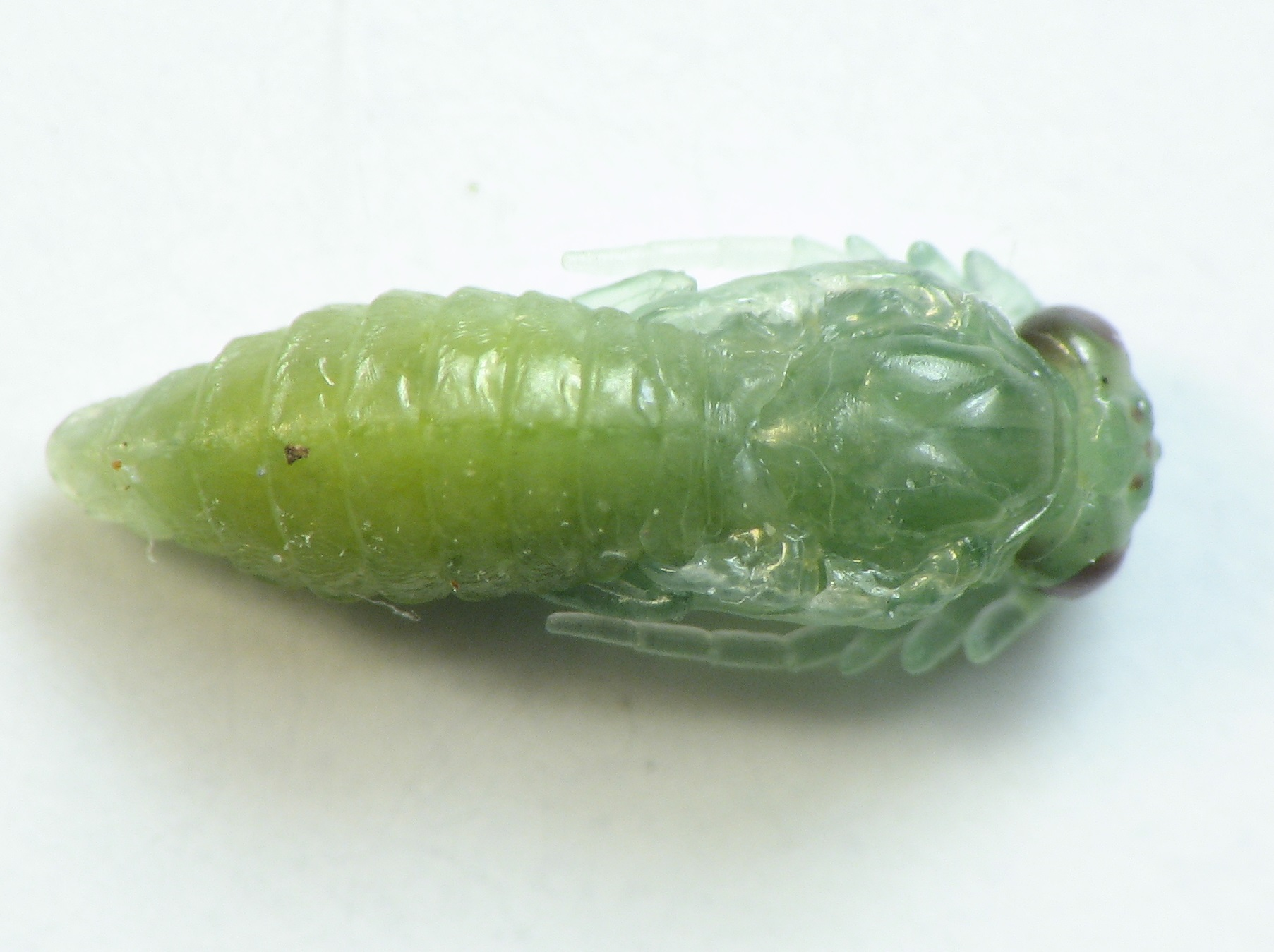
Pupa, dorsal view

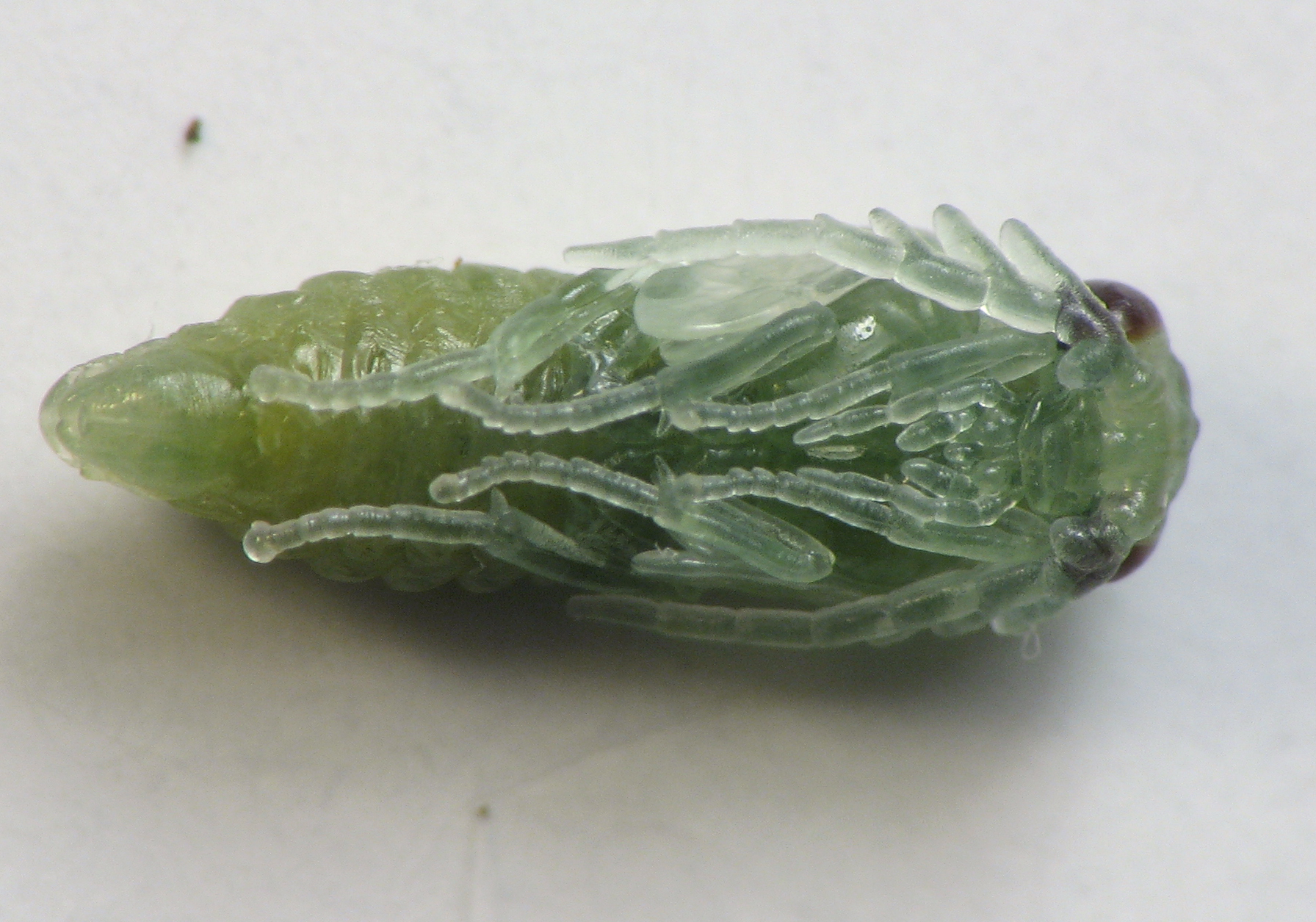
Pupa, ventral view

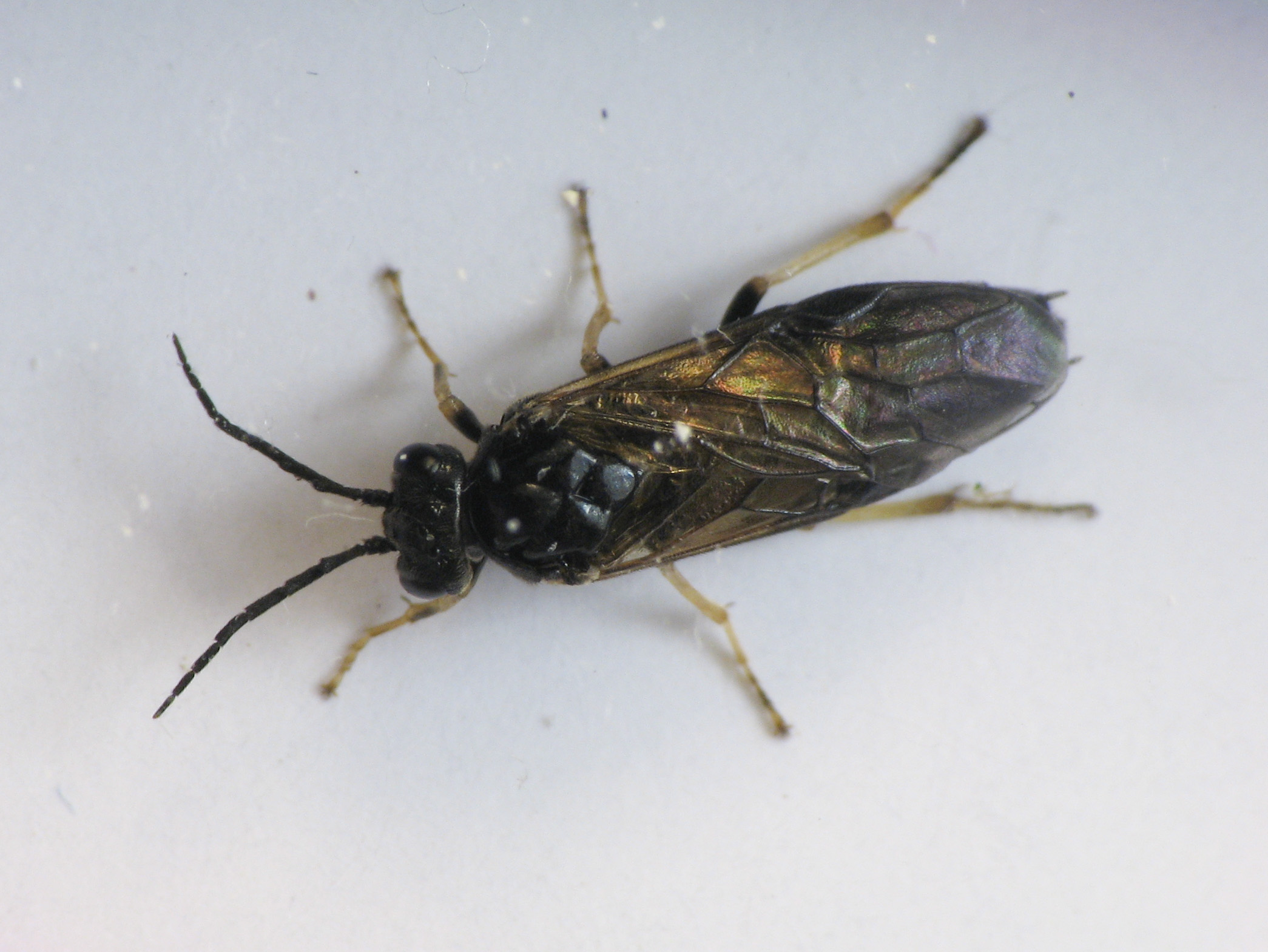
Female

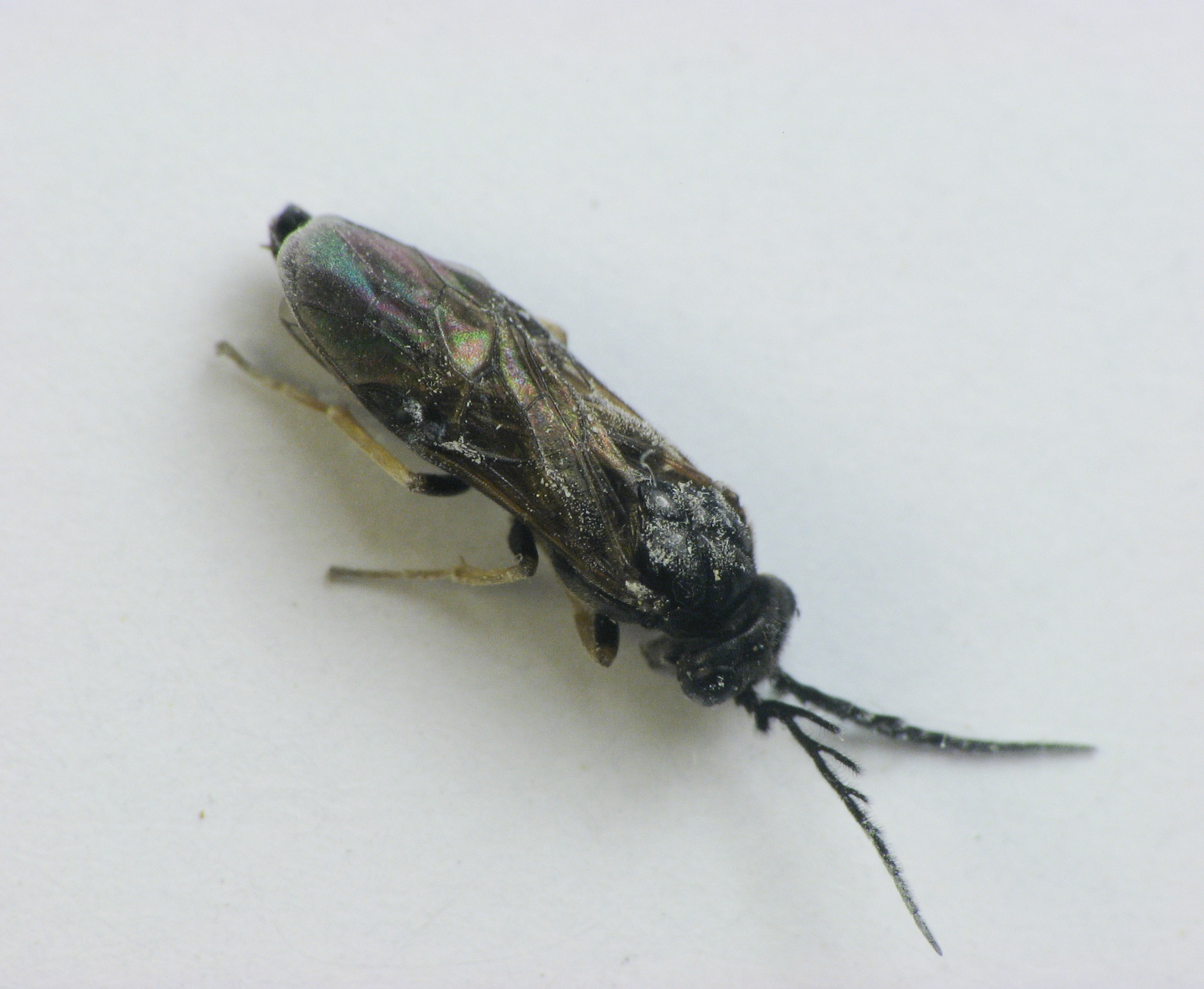
Male
