= Igor Escudero =

Spanish musician

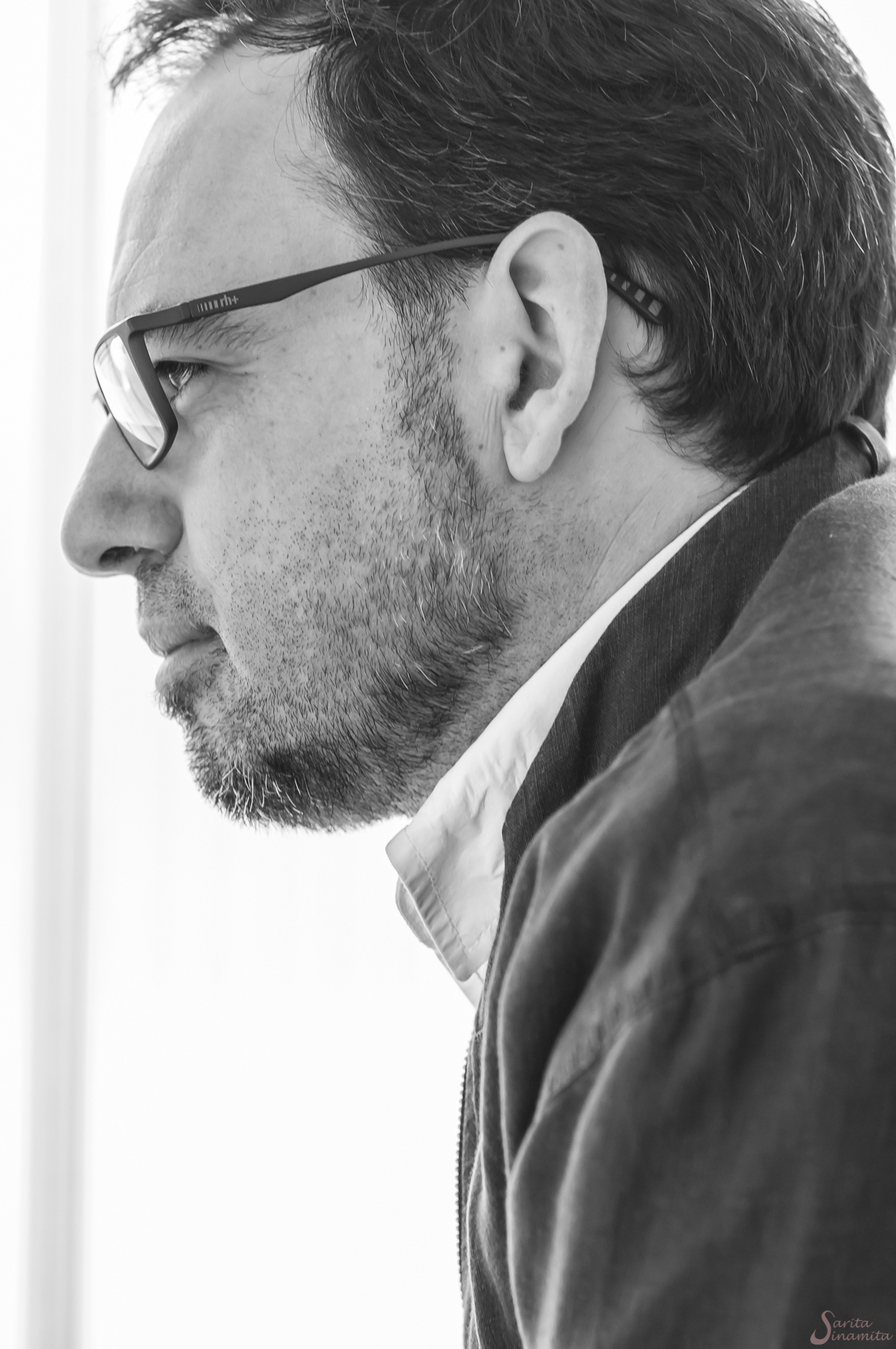
Igor-Escudero

Igor Escudero Morais (born Leon, Spain, 1977) is a Spanish musician, best known as a composer of classical music and opera. He is the author of eleven operas (including the trilogy based on "I, Claudius", premiered with the Castile and León Symphony Orchestra), three musicals ("The Fall of the House of Usher"' has also been considered chamber opera), three profane oratorios ("The mountain of souls", "The glass Cathedral" and "Moonbeam"), concerts, soundtracks for documentaries (four pieces for two documentaries for "The Time Tunnel" of "RTVE"), OST for audiovisuals and short films, sacred and profane choral music, cantatas and a great variety of chamber pieces.

== Selected works ==
=== Opera ===
- Aquerra (2026)
- The legend of Tamonante (2021)
- The Commoners (2021)
- I, Claudius & Claudius the God(2019)
1. Part One: Livia
2. Part Two: Caligula
3. Part Three: Claudius, the God
- Peter I, the Evil (2009)
- Oci, the Shaman (2006)

=== Chamber opera ===
- The metamorphosis (2023)
- Borderland (2022)
- Casina(2013)
- The third king (2012)

=== Secular oratorios ===
- The mountain of souls (2020)
- The glass Cathedral (2014)
- Moonbeam (2011)

=== Filmography and discography ===
- The Time Tunnel (2018)
- Adendro (2015)

=== Musicals ===
- The Fall of the House of Usher (2016)
- The Goggólori (2007)
- Dragon's head (2006)

=== Cantatas ===
- Ego, Rodericus: symphonic legend (2022)
- Song of Songs (2015)

=== Audiovisuals and short films ===
- De hoy al ayer: Una mirada al pasado (2006)
- El tiempo del pastor (2006)
- La oveja negra (2005)
- Lola y las bolas de lana (2005)
- La crisis creativa (2004)
- Prisioneros (2004)
- Un poco como todo (2003)
