= The Wizard of Linn =

1950 novel written by A. E. van Vogt

- First edition
- Author: A. E. van Vogt
- Cover artist: Ed Valigursky
- Language: English
- Series: The Atom Gods/Clane
- Genre: Science fiction
- Publisher: Ace Books
- Publication date: 1962
- Publication place: United States
- Media type: Print (Paperback)
- Pages: 190
- Preceded by: Empire of the Atom

The Wizard of Linn is a science fiction novel by American writer A. E. van Vogt, a sequel to Empire of the Atom. The novel was originally serialized in the science fiction magazine Astounding Science Fiction (April - June 1950). It was first published in book form in Germany in 1961 by Terra Sonderband, as Der Zauberer von Linn.

== Plot ==
An alien starship has entered the Solar System sometime in the Sixth Century of the Thirteenth Millennium A. D. The ship appears to belong to the Riss, an alien race who had come to Sol millennia ago and destroyed the thriving human civilization. Now the descendants of the survivors, living in a medieval society with spaceships, must face the threat again. One of those is Jerrin, Lord Advisor of the Linnan Empire. Jerrin is annoyed that his brother, the mutant atom priest Clane, knew about the Riss incursion before he did and is more annoyed when Clane recommends an attack on the Riss ship, one that is guaranteed to fail.

The attack does indeed fail, but Clane, Jerrin, and their associates are protected by a glassy-looking aetherial sphere that Clane controls mentally and that absorbs energy. For his second attack Clane sneaks aboard the Riss ship and uses the sphere to eliminate the crew. Taking over the ship, Clane flies it to his estate. There he discovers that Jerrin has been assassinated, poisoned by his wife Lilidel, who was concerned that her son Calaj was to be disinherited from the Lord Advisorship. Worse, Clane discovers that his magic sphere has been stolen by followers of Czinczar, a barbarian from Europa who recently tried to conquer the Empire of Linn.

Calaj becomes Lord Advisor and Clane convinces him to sign a document, which he does without reading it. Lilidel is incensed: though the document appears to strengthen Calaj, she is suspicious, especially knowing that Clane has disappeared. Then the Riss arrive.

Clane has taken part of his army along with Czinczar and his army aboard the captured Riss ship, which he has renamed Solar Star, and has headed out on a one-year journey to a star sixty-five light-years from Sol. On arrival they discover two Earth-like planets revolving about their common center of mass as they go around their sun. The planets are occupied by humans, but Clane and his crew are shocked to discover that those people can teleport themselves and other things at will and that they have a peaceful trading relationship with the Riss. During the visit Clane and his crew engage and destroy a Riss battleship. Then, using star maps retrieved from the wreckage, Clane takes the Solar Star on a three-month voyage to a Riss solar system.

Clane and his army establish a bridgehead on the Riss planet and fend off a Riss attack. After the attack the Terrans discover humans living in vast artificial caverns and Clane discovers that they have another aetherial sphere, which he controls with his thoughts. Taking the sphere with them, Clane and his men reboard the Solar Star and return to Earth.

Clane quickly re-establishes himself on Earth and takes over the government, using the document that Calaj so carelessly signed. He sends Lilidel and Calaj into exile and then employs the aetherial sphere in a new way to defeat the Riss.

== Sources ==
- A. E van Vogt, The Wizard of Linn, Ace Books 1962
- Tuck, Donald H. (1974). The Encyclopedia of Science Fiction and Fantasy. Chicago: Advent. pg. 432. ISBN 0-911682-20-1.
