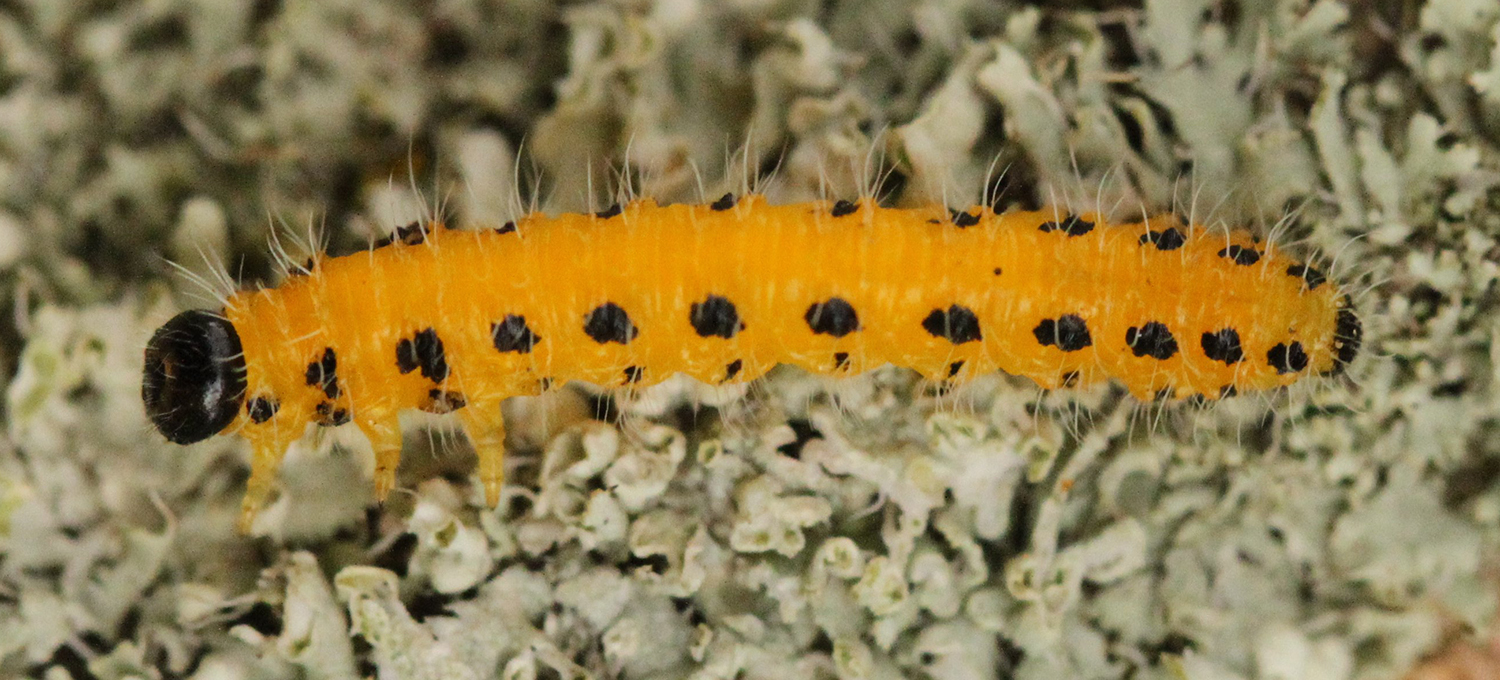
- Cladius grandis

Scientific classification
- Kingdom: Animalia
- Phylum: Arthropoda
- Class: Insecta
- Order: Hymenoptera
- Suborder: Symphyta
- Family: Tenthredinidae
- Subfamily: Nematinae
- Tribe: Cladiini
- Genus: Cladius; Illiger, 1807

= Cladius (sawfly) =

Genus of sawflies

Cladius is a genus of common sawflies in the family Tenthredinidae. There are about 40 described species in Cladius.

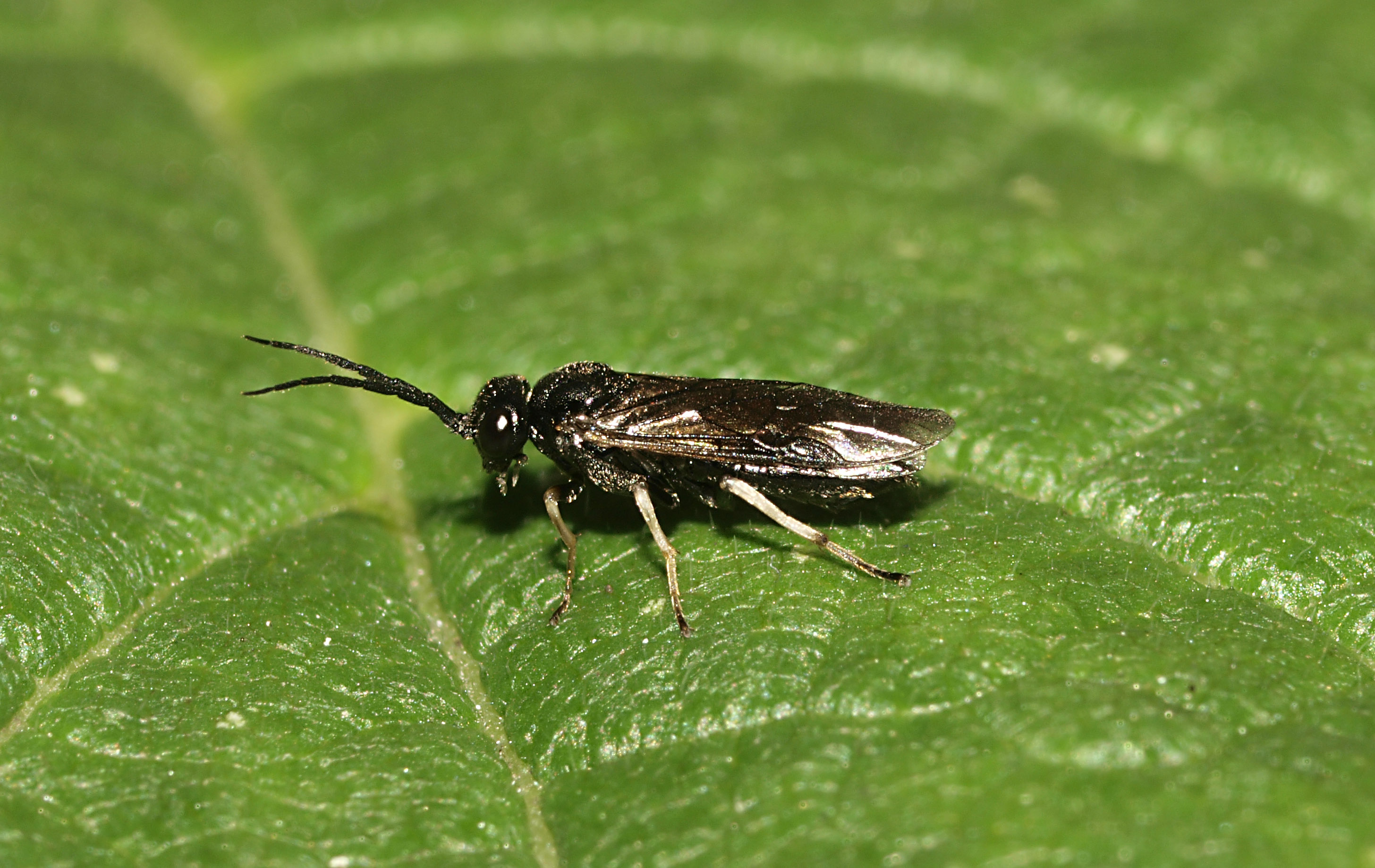
Cladius pectinicornis, female

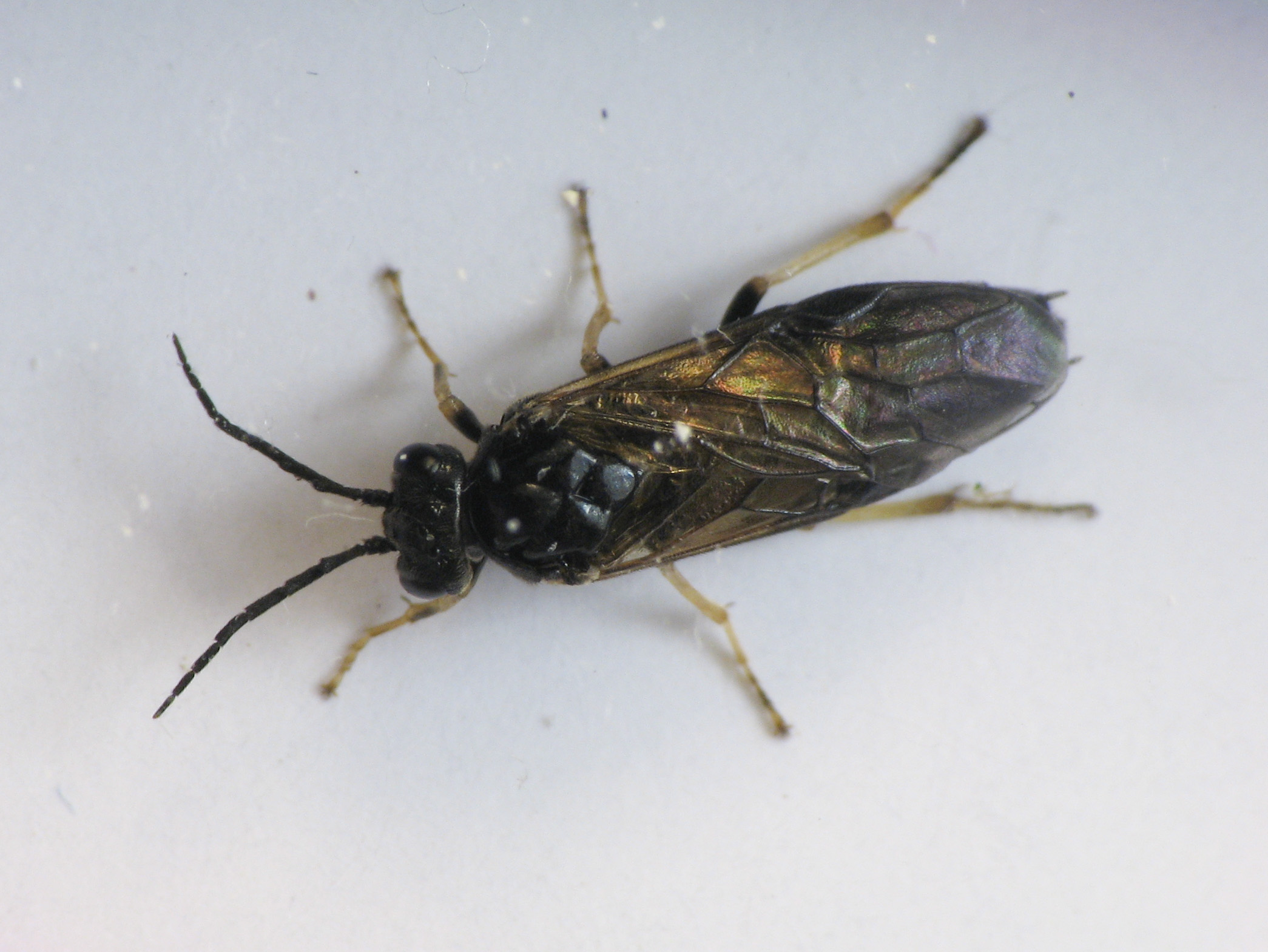
Cladius difformis, female

== Species ==
A selection of species that belong to the genus Cladius include:

- Cladius aeneus Zaddach, 1859^{g}
- Cladius brullei (Dahlbom, 1835)^{g}
- Cladius comari Stein, 1886^{g}
- Cladius compressicornis (Fabricius, 1804)^{g}
- Cladius difformis (Panzer)^{i c g b} (bristly rose slug)
- Cladius foveivaginatus (Malaise, 1931)^{g}
- Cladius grandis (Serville, 1823)^{g}
- Cladius hyalopterus (Jakovlev, 1891)^{g}
- Cladius nigricans Cameron, 1902^{g}
- Cladius nubilus (Konow, 1897)^{g}
- Cladius ordubadensis Konow, 1892^{g}
- Cladius pallipes Serville, 1823^{g}
- Cladius palmicornis Konow, 1892^{g}
- Cladius pectinicornis (Geoffroy, 1785)^{g}
- Cladius pilicornis (Curtis, 1833)^{g}
- Cladius rufipes (Serville, 1823)^{g}
- Cladius ulmi (Linnaeus, 1758)^{g}

Data sources: i = ITIS, c = Catalogue of Life, g = GBIF, b = Bugguide.net
