= Saint Claudius =

Saint Claudius may refer to:

- Claudius of Besançon (Saint Claude) (d. 699 AD), bishop and abbot
- Saint Claudius, one of the Four Crowned Martyrs
- Saint Claudius, martyr of León, Spain, one of the sons of Saint Marcellus of Tangier
- Saints Claudius and Hilaria, two martyrs who were converted by Saints Chrysanthus and Daria

== See also ==
- St. Claude de la Colombière
