= I, Claudius (opera) =

2019 trilogy by Igor Escudero

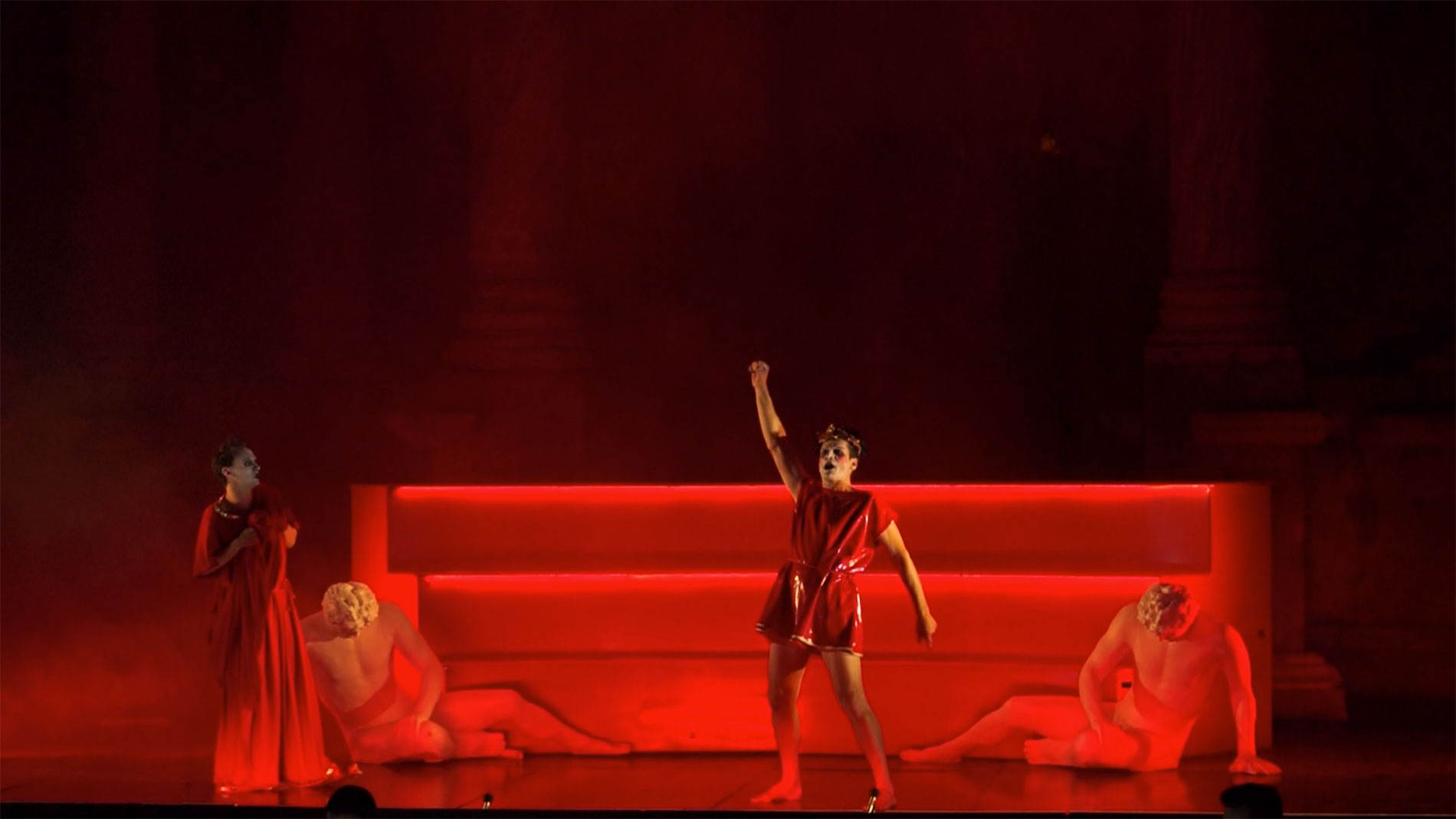
Calígula

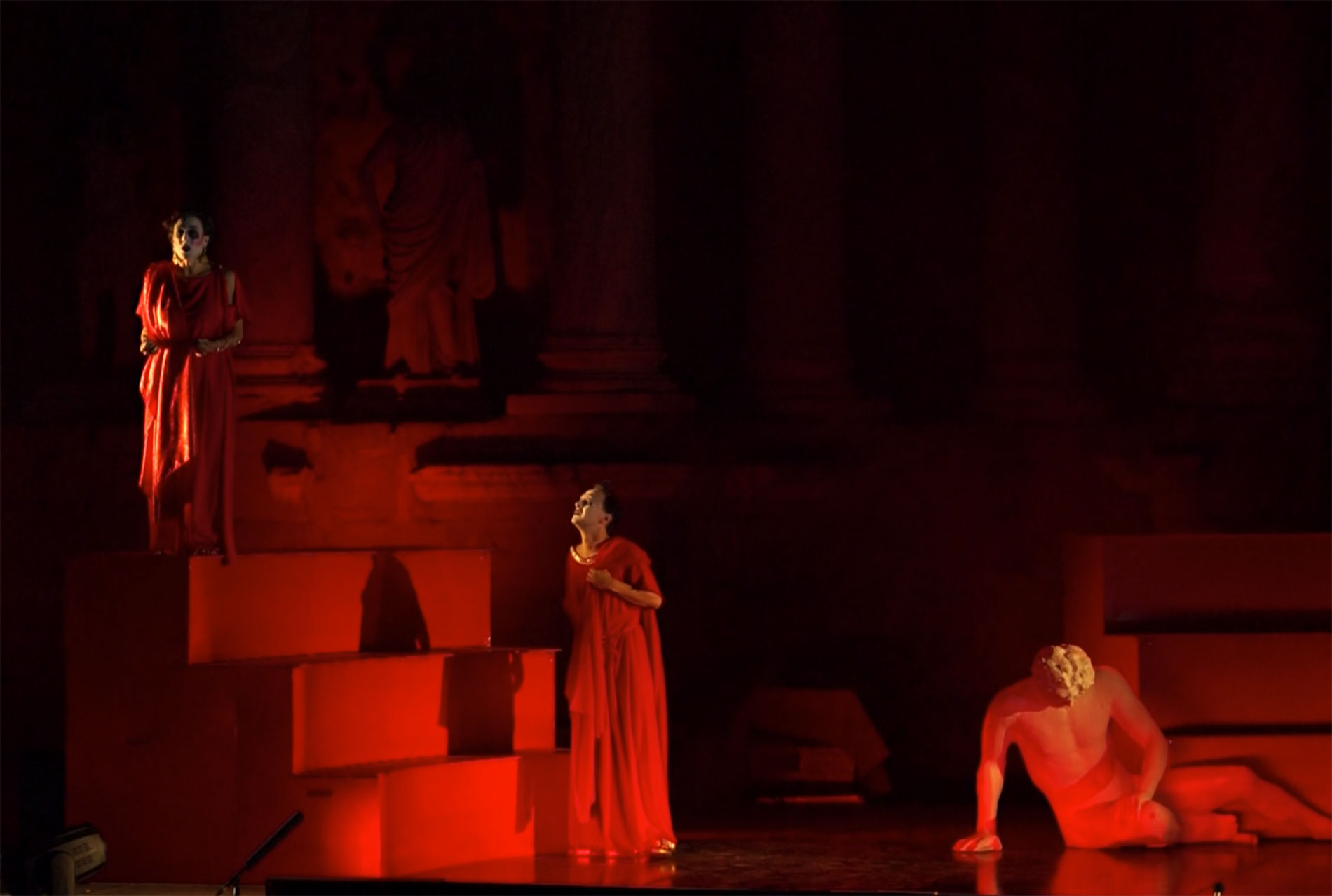
Yo, Claudio

The opera trilogy I, Claudius and Claudius the God is the work of composer Igor Escudero.

== The trilogy ==
The three parts, or chapters, that form I, Claudius and Claudius the God are titled Livia, Caligula and Claudius the God, and have been conceived to be performed not only sequentially, but also separately.

=== Part 1: Livia ===
Augustus, first emperor and head of the Julio-Claudian family, has led Rome to an era of wide expansion and social and economic growth. Livia, his wife, controls him and runs Rome from the shadows. Through the years she has been slowly getting rid of anyone who dared escape her control, no matter if family or not.

It's been foretold that the Julio-Claudian family will rule Rome for decades. This dynasty has a black sheep, young Claudius, a weak and crippled boy who has a stutter. Despite his kindness and honesty, Claudius is repudiated by almost everyone, including his mother. His brother Germanicus and his friend Postumus, who are both candidates to succeed Augustus as the leaders of Rome, are the only ones who love him.

Livia manipulates Augustus to name her son Tiberius as heir to the throne.

=== Part 2: Caligula ===
Following Livia's death, Tiberius's depravity is out of control. Rome sinks into a Dark Age, marked by corruption and non-stop executions of citizens. Tiberius's life is close to an end, and Caligula has been chosen to succeed him. Claudius knows that his nephew, Caligula, shares nothing of his father's virtuous nature.

After just a few months of being on the throne, the people of Rome grow tired of Caligula's excesses and eccentricities. Rome plunges into a reign of terror, even worse than that of Tiberius.

=== Part 3: Claudius the God ===
Caligula has been murdered by his captain of the Guard, Cassius. His death has left a power vacuum in Rome that the Senate, devoid of any ability to govern on its own after decades of humiliations and the submission, tries to fill by naming Claudius as emperor.

Claudius proves wrong everyone who thought him a fool. He devotes himself to work tirelessly to rebuild everything that his predecessors destroyed. He undertakes social and economic reforms and public works. Leading an army on the battlefield for the first time in his life, Claudius manages to annex and pacify Britain, making it a new Roman province.

Claudius faces challenges. In Jerusalem, Herod, who believes himself the incarnation of the messiah, plans a general uprising in the East. And at home, Claudius doesn't realise that the person he trusts the most is the one who most likely will betray him: his own wife Messalina.
