= Planetary series =

Short story series by Stanley G. Weinbaum

The Planetary series of stories by Stanley G. Weinbaum is a series of short stories, published in Wonder Stories and Astounding Stories in the 1930s, which are set upon various planets and moons of the Solar System.

The stories are marked by attention to the detail of the alien ecosystems with which Weinbaum equips his planets. Though only a few of the stories share protagonists, there is enough shared detail between the stories to show that they belong to a common fictional universe. The birdlike Martians of "A Martian Odyssey" and "Valley of Dreams", for instance, are mentioned in "Redemption Cairn", and "The Red Peri" and the Venusian trioptes of "Parasite Planet" and "The Lotus Eaters" are mentioned in "The Mad Moon". In Weinbaum's Solar System, in accordance with the then-current near-collision hypothesis, the gas giants radiate heat, enough to warm their satellites to Earthlike temperatures, allowing for Earthlike environments on Io, Europa, Titan, and even Uranus. Mars is also sufficiently Earthlike to allow humans to walk its surface (with training in thin-air chambers) unprotected.

The series includes the following ten titles, in publication order:

Title	Published in	Publication Date	Setting	Fictional date	Main characters	Other
"A Martian Odyssey"	Wonder Stories	July 1934	Mars	early 2000s	Dick Jarvis, Tweel	
"Valley of Dreams"	Wonder Stories	Nov. 1934	Mars	early 2000s	Dick Jarvis, Tweel	sequel to "A Martian Odyssey"
"Flight on Titan"	Astounding Stories	Jan. 1935	Titan	2142*	Tim and Diane Vick	
"Parasite Planet"	Astounding Stories	Feb. 1935	Venus	late 21st century	Hamilton Hammond, Patricia Burlingame	
"The Lotus Eaters"	Astounding Stories	Apr. 1935	Venus	late 21st century	Ham & Pat Hammond	sequel to "Parasite Planet"
"The Planet of Doubt"	Astounding Stories	Oct. 1935	Uranus	2100	Ham & Pat Hammond	sequel to "The Lotus Eaters"
"The Red Peri"	Astounding Stories	Nov. 1935	Pluto	ca. 2080	Frank Keene, Peri Maclane	
"The Mad Moon"	Astounding Stories	Dec. 1935	Io	2112	Grant Calthorpe, Lee Neilan	
"Redemption Cairn"	Astounding Stories	Mar. 1936	Europa	2111	Jack Sands, Claire Avery	
"Tidal Moon"	Thrilling Wonder Stories	Dec. 1938	Ganymede	2083	Ben Amherst, Carol Kent	posthumous publication completed by Stanley Weinbaum's sister Helen

== Chronology ==
- Less than 20 years before "A Martian Odyssey" – "Atomic blast" perfected by Doheny. (A Martian Odyssey)
- 10 years before "A Martian Odyssey" – First Moon expedition by Cardoza, followed by half-a-dozen others and the failed de Lancey expedition to Venus.(A Martian Odyssey)
- Early 2000s – Events of "A Martian Odyssey" and "Valley of Dreams"
- 2000-2005 - Colonization of Venus (The Red Peri)
- 2020 – International Congress at Lisle apportions the British and American claims to Venus (The Lotus Eaters)
- 2030* – Hocken rocket developed, followed by Russian annexation of the Moon and travel to Mars and Venus (Flight on Titan)
- 2059 – Council of Berne limits extent of planetary claims made by discoverers. (The Planet of Doubt)
- 2060 – Young expedition to Uranus (The Planet of Doubt)
- c. 2067 — Perry Maclane invents the thermoid expansion chamber (The Red Peri)
- c. 2065-2061 — Legal battle between Perry Maclane and Interplanetary (The Red Peri)
- c. 2061 — Peri Maclane born (The Red Peri)
- c. 2064 — Perry Maclane sets up a pirate base on Pluto with the advance ship Red Peri (The Red Peri)
- c. 2070 — Pacific War (Redemption Cairn)
- c. 2077 — Death of Perry Maclane in a raid on the Lucrece (The Red Peri)
- c. 2079 — The Red Peri takes and loots the Aardkin
- c. 2080 – Events of "The Red Peri"
- 2083 — Events of "Tidal Moon"
- 2090s – Events of "Parasite Planet" and "The Lotus Eaters"
- 2100 – Events of "The Planet of Doubt"
- 2110 – Gold crisis (The Mad Moon); Gunderson expedition to Europa (Redemption Cairn)
- 2111 - Events of "Redemption Cairn"
- 2112 – Events of "The Mad Moon"
- 2137* — Human settlement on Titan initiated (Flight on Titan)
- 2140-2142* — Financial speculation in trading with Venus (Flight on Titan)
- 2142* – Failure of the Planetary Trading Corporation (Flight on Titan)
- 2143* – Events of "Flight on Titan"

*Dates in Flight on Titan are inconsistent with themselves and the rest of Weinbaum's planetary stories. The principal date given is 2142, and the main story takes place in the following year; however, 2030 is referred to within the story as if it were a recent date, and references to the events in Flight on Titan in other stories indicate that they must have taken place before both The Lotus Eaters and The Mad Moon, i.e. in the 21st and not the 22nd century.

== Solar System ==
Weinbaum's Solar System corresponds to the scientific Solar System as envisioned in the mid-1930s, with details supplied from Weinbaum's imagination. By 1934, the Solar System was known to consist of the Sun, nine planets, 26 moons, and a few thousand asteroids and comets. Unlike the Solar System as known today, Weinbaum's Solar System was full of life-forms, many of them intelligent; however, only the humans of Earth possessed the capacity for spaceflight (though there is evidence the Martians may have had it in the past). Weinbaum limited himself to planets and moons as settings, naming the following:

- Venus — Setting of Parasite Planet and The Lotus Eaters. Weinbaum's Venus rotates synchronously with its revolution, so that one side is scorched by the unremitting heat of the Sun, and the other remains in an eternal frozen night. Mild temperatures are only found in a narrow, planet-girdling "twilight zone". First (failed) expedition to Venus led by de Lancey. Later successful expeditions led by Crowly (U.S.) and Burlingame (U.K.). Portions of the twilight zone are claimed by the United States, United Kingdom, and the Netherlands. Human settlements include Erotia (American) and Venoble (British).
- Earth — Home of the only actively spacefaring civilization in the Solar System. As of the 22nd century, still divided into many independent, competing nations, including the U.S., U.K., Russia, France, Germany, Netherlands. Pacific War was fought here c. 2070, including the use of atomic bombs.
  - Earth's Moon — Considered "arid and useless". Annexed by Russia.
- Mars — Setting of A Martian Odyssey and Valley of Dreams. A largely desert planet, consisting of orange deserts, grey plains covered with 'biopods', and criss-crossed by canals that feed water from the polar caps. First visited by the international (U.S./French/German) Ares expedition. Home to the intelligent Martians, the semi-intelligent barrel-creatures, the unintelligent pyramid builders, and the deadly dream-beast.
- Jupiter: Fifth planet from the Sun, three of whose four large moons are habitable, though Europa only barely so. Radiates sufficient heat to warm the inner moons well beyond the heat they receive from the Sun.
  - Io — Setting of The Mad Moon. Two major settlements are Junopolis at the north pole and Herapolis at the south pole. Heated by both the Sun and Jupiter's own heat, the remainder of the moon is a fever-ridden wilderness. Home of loonies and slinkers. The pharmaceutical ferva is collected here.
  - Europa — Setting of Redemption Cairn. Mostly airless, with the small amount of air there is collected in valleys on the Jupiter-facing side of the moon. The rocks are rich in deposits of protactinium.
  - Ganymede — Setting of Tidal Moon. The moon is swept by periodic tidal waves that circle it every three months. The only surface vegetation, save at the poles, is the medicinal cree moss. Ganymede is chilly, with a temperature varying from 25 to 35 °F (−4 to 2 °C). The subpolar flood belt creates atmospheric disturbances that interfere with radio communication.
- Saturn
  - Titan — Setting of Flight on Titan. A cold, snowy world buffeted by near-constant winds. Chief settlement is Nivia. Claimed by the United States.
  - Iapetus — Mentioned as a cold world supporting life. (The Lotus Eaters)
- Uranus — Setting of The Planet of Doubt. Seventh planet of the solar system, warmed by internal heat. Has a solid, sub-atmospheric surface, with seas and continents perpetually shrouded in fog. The thick atmosphere limits visibility to fifty feet, muffles sound, and effectively impedes radio communications. First visited by Young in 2060, then by the Gaea expedition in 2100. Can only be reached by rockets based on Titan (Saturn system). Portions claimed by the United States; no settlements as of 2100.
- Pluto — Setting of much of The Red Peri. Ninth and most distant planet of the Solar System. First visited by Atsuki (unverified) and then by Hervey and Caspari. Larger than Earth and with a fifth again the gravity. Only human settlement was the pirate base of the Red Peri (2064-2080).

== Characters ==
- Amherst, Bob — (Tidal Moon)
- Atsuki — First person to visit Pluto, though the claim is disputed. (The Red Peri)
- Avery, Claire — Nicknamed "The Golden Flash". Rocket racer. Co-pilot on the Henshaw expedition to Europa. (Redemption Cairn)
- Basil — Space pirate on the Red Peri, brother of Elza. (The Red Peri)
- Briggs — Original co-pilot of the Hera, replaced by Kratska on Io after he fell sick with white fever (blancha).
- Burlingame, Patricia — Daughter of Patrick Burlingame, biologist, British. Later married Hamilton Hammond. (Parasite Planet, The Lotus Eaters, The Planet of Doubt)
- Burlingame, Patrick — British explorer of Venus. (Parasite Planet)
- Calthorpe, Grant — Trader collecting Ionian ferva leaf for Neilan Drug, formerly a big-game hunter on Venus and Titan; lost his fortune in the crisis of 2110.
- Cardoza — First person to travel by atomic rocket to the Moon. (A Martian Odyssey)
- Caspari — 3rd person to visit Pluto (The Red Peri)
- Coretti, Stefan — Nominally chemist on the Henshaw expedition; actually a government agent. (Redemption Cairn)
- Crowly — American explorer who claimed much of Venus' twilight zone for the United States. (The Lotus Eaters)
- Cullen — Chemist on the Gaea expedition to Uranus. (Planet of Doubt)
- de Lancey — Leader of the unsuccessful first flight to Venus. (A Martian Odyssey)
- Doheny — American scientist who perfected the atomic blast, dying in the process. (A Martian Odyssey)
- Elza — Space pirate on the Red Peri. (The Red Peri)
- Grandi, Marco — Space pirate on the Red Peri. (The Red Peri)
- Gunderson — Leader of the 2110 expedition to Europa, died in the crash of the Hera. (Redemption Cairn)
- Hammond, Hamilton — Nicknamed "Ham". Trader and xixtchil collector in the Venusian hotlands. Married to Patricia Burlingame.(Parasite Planet, The Lotus Eaters, The Planet of Doubt)
- Harbord — Astrogator on the Gaea expedition to Uranus (Planet of Doubt)
- Harrick — Important figure in Interplanetary. (Redemption Cairn)
- Harrison — Captain and astronomer of the Ares expedition, American (A Martian Odyssey, Valley of Dreams)
- Harvey — Gustavus Neilan's assistant (The Mad Moon)
- Hawkins — First officer of the Aardkin. (The Red Peri)
- Henshaw, Harris — Captain of the 2nd organized expedition to Europa; killed by Kratska. (Redemption Cairn)
- Hervey — 2nd man to visit Pluto. (The Red Peri)
- Jarvis, Dick — Chemist of the Ares expedition, American (A Martian Odyssey, Valley of Dreams)
- Keene, Frank — Radiologist and physicist, radiation engineer on the Limbo expedition into deep space. (The Red Peri)
- Kent, Carl — (Tidal Moon)
- Kent, Carol — (Tidal Moon)
- Kratska — co-pilot on the Gunderson expedition to Europa, contributed to the crash of the Hera. Hexylamine addict. Later went as biologist on the Henshaw expedition to Europa under the pseudonym of Ivor Gogrol. (Redemption Cairn)
- Leroy, Pierre — Biologist of the Ares expedition. Citizen of the "Sixth Commune" in France. (A Martian Odyssey, Valley of Dreams)
- Maclane, Perry (d. 2077) — Nicknamed "Red". Inventor of the thermoid expansion chamber. (The Red Peri)
- Maclane, Peri (2061-) — Daughter of Perry Maclane, pirate, called "The Red Peri" (The Red Peri)
- Neilan, Gustavus — Owner of Neilan Drug, a pharmaceutical concern on Io. (The Mad Moon)
- Neilan, Lee — Daughter of Gustavus Neilan, later married to Grant Calthorpe. (The Mad Moon)
- Nestor, Solomon (2025-) — Representative of the Smithsonian on the Limbo's deep-space expedition. (The Red Peri)
- Putz, Karl — Engineer of the Ares expedition. Native of Germany. (A Martian Odyssey, Valley of Dreams)
- Sand, Jack — Pilot of the first two major expeditions to Europa, on the Hera in 2110 and the Minos in 2111. (Redemption Cairn)
- Scaler, Kirt — (Tidal Moon)
- ten Eyck, Peter — Captain of the Dutch spaceship Aardkin (The Red Peri)
- Thorsen — Captain of the Interplanetary ship Lucrece; killed "Red" Perry Maclane, killed by Maclane's daughter Peri. (The Red Peri)
- Tweel — A native Martian, given his name by Dick Jarvis based on a sound he produced resembling "Trrrweerrlll." (A Martian Odyssey, Valley of Dreams)
- Vick, Diane — Canadian-born wife of Timothy Vick, accompanied him to Titan. (Flight on Titan)
- Vick, Timothy — A 'vision set salesman in New York, who turned to searching for flame orchids on Titan after being ruined in a stock market crash. (Flight on Titan)
- Young — Explorer (probably American) of Titan and Uranus (Flight on Titan, The Planet of Doubt)

== Bestiary ==
(All entities mentioned are nonsentient animals unless otherwise noted)

- Barrel-beast — Semi-sentient beings with barrel-shaped bodies, four legs and four tentacles, and apparently a collective consciousness, which build anthill-like structures of mud and clay. (A Martian Odyssey)
- Biopod — Crawling plant-animals found on the Martian plains; of various forms, but some resemble green grass blades with two legs. (A Martian Odyssey)
- Bladder-bird — Three-foot gliding creature on Europa, capable of brief excursions out of Europa's shallow atmosphere using air stored in their balloon-shaped bladders. (Redemption Cairn)
- Chains — Animals on Uranus, black, about six feet tall and eight feet long, with three pairs of legs. Each creature forms a separable segment of a chain of the animals, neurally linked as long as they remain in contact but capable of independent survival. Thought to be the larvae of some flying animal in the Uranian atmosphere. (The Planet of Doubt)
- Crystal crawler — A silicon-based crystalline moss-like organism found on Pluto, with various forms specialized to devour specific elements (e.g., aluminum, iron, or carbon). (The Red Peri)
- Doughpot — Amorphous, amoeba-like white protoplasm that devours anything it touches. (The Parasite Planet)
- Dream-beast — A black, tentacled predator on Mars that attracts its prey by projecting a telepathic image of something the prey desires; much like an Anglerfish. (A Martian Odyssey)
- Duster — Hawk-sized but highly fragile moth-like flying animals on Venus that feed on clouds of pollen in the skies. (Parasite Planet)
- Friendly tree — Weak, Sluggish cold-blooded plant on Venus that is still enough to allow one to rest on its branches. (Parasite Planet)
- Gamma Rorqual — Warm-blooded animal found on Ganymede, resembling a whale with a long spike-like tooth. (Tidal Moon)
- Hipp — Hippocampus Catamiti ("Seahorse of Ganymede"). Twenty-foot-long "sea-horse" on Ganymede that serves as a riding mount for human settlers.
- Ice-ant — 3-inch long egg-like animal on Titan that builds domes of ice. (Flight on Titan)
- Jack Ketch tree — Carnivorous plant on Venus that traps life in its dangling, noose-like tendrils. (Parasite Planet)
- Knife-kite — Birdlike predator on Titan, the size of a large pterodactyl with a 3-foot-long (0.91 m) beak for impaling prey. Glides rather than flies on Titan's continual winds. (Flight on Titan, The Mad Moon)
- Land leet — Tentacled organism that copies the genetic code of whatever it devours; thus using its prey's adaptations as its own. Found on Ganymede. (Tidal Moon)
- Loony — Lunæ Jovis Magnicaput ("big-head of Jupiter's Moon"). A large-headed, long-necked, native of Io; their ancestors created a now-extinct civilization. They behave in a fashion befitting a psychotic or a schizophrenic as perceived by humans. (The Mad Moon)
- Lotus Eater — Lotophagus Veneris ("Lotus-eater of Venus"). A sentient plant, with a collective mind existing on the dark side of Venus. Most exobiologists believe it to be further along the evolutionary scale than man; as they have evolved to the point where they know all the secrets of the universe - and hence, no longer have a reason to exist, have accepted extinction.
- Martian — Intelligent beings resembling ostriches with an 18-inch long, flexible beak and four-fingered hands. Martians were the founders of a civilization now in its last decline. (A Martian Odyssey, Valley of Dreams)
- Nympus — (Plural nympus.) Intelligent native of Ganymede, with short legs lacking knee joints, long arms joined to their bodies like webs, and heads expanding at the top like mushrooms. (Tidal Moon)
- Parcat — A three-legged, domestic animal found on Io, with two small arms in front and one which they use to hop in the back. Parcats, like parrots, are capable of imitating human speech. (The Mad Moon)
- Pharisee — A carnivorous Venusian tree closely resembling the Friendly tree, but capable of attacking its prey with impaling spikes (Parasite Planet)
- Pyramid monster — Silicon-based animal on Mars that builds pyramids out of 'bricks' that are its excreta and produces small, hollow crystalline spheres that are its spores or eggs. (A Martian Odyssey)
- Slinker — Mus sapiens ("wise mouse"). A semi-sentient, Demon-like species native to Io, builders of miniature colonies that somewhat resemble cities. Vicious, mischievous and incredibly opposed to Humankind, the Slinkers are the biggest problem for Human Colonists on Io. (The Mad Moon) They are also found on Mars, implying that Tweel's species reached Io in its spacefaring past (Valley of Dreams).
- Threadworm — Nematoidus Titani. Semi-sentient worm-like animal, with a single eye on a stalk and one fang, capable of hypnotizing its prey with a horrific buzzing noise that vibrates through the ice and paralyzes its intended kill. Always found among the ruins of an ancient Titanian civilization, of which this species may be the creator. (Flight on Titan, The Mad Moon)
- Titanian — Semi-sentient species native to Titan, about four feet long and resembling a seal or large slug. Adapted to endure cold by having a streamlined surface on its skin. (Flight on Titan)
- Triops — Triops noctivivans; plural trioptes The "three-eyed dweller in the dark". A semi-intelligent three-eyed, four-legged creature dwelling in the shadowed parts of the Mountains of Eternity and on Venus' dark side; thought to be related to the native Venusians. (Parasite Planet, The Lotus Eaters)
- Uniped — A large Venusian animal that leaps on a single foot and uses a ten-foot beak to impale prey. (Parasite Planet, The Mad Moon)
- Venusian — Four-legged intelligent native of Venus, with three eyes and a largely unintelligible speech. (Parasite Planet)
- Whiplash tree — Tree with elastic limbs on Titan, capable of delivering a stinging blow when touched. (Flight on Titan)

== Places ==
- Aquia — Carl Kent's trading station on Ganymede. (Tidal Moon)
- Ascanius — "Canal" connecting Mare Cimmerium and Mare Chronium. (Valley of Dreams)
- Cool Country — The cooler regions of Venus' twilight zone. (Parasite Planet)
- Dutch Alps — Mountains on Venus, in the section allotted to the Netherlands. Emeralds are mined there. (The Red Peri)
- Erotia — American settlement in the Cool Country of Venus, named for the god Eros. (Parasite Planet)
- Fever Sea — sea on Io. (The Mad Moon)
- Herapolis — Human settlement at the south pole of Io. (The Mad Moon)
- Hotlands — The hotter regions of Venus' twilight zone. (Parasite Planet)
- Hydropole — City built at the south pole of Ganymede. (Tidal Moon)
- Idiots' Hills — Hills on Io, in which are found evidences of a past civilization of loonies. (The Mad Moon)
- Junopolis — Human settlement at the north pole of Io. (The Mad Moon, Redemption Cairn)
- Madman's Pass — 25,000-foot pass in the Greater Mountains of Eternity. (Parasite Planet)
- Mare Australe — "Southern Sea", area at the southern pole of Mars. (Valley of Dreams)
- Mare Cimmerium — "Cimmerian Sea", dark area in the southern hemisphere of Mars between 10° and 40° S; a grey plain covered with biopods. Landing site of the Ares. (A Martian Odyssey)
- Mare Chronium — "Enduring Sea", dark area in the southern hemisphere of Mars between 50° and 60° S. (A Martian Odyssey)
- Mountains of the Damned — mountains on Titan bordering Nivia (Flight on Titan)
- Mountains of Eternity — mountains on Venus, up to 20 miles tall, running roughly east-to-west in Venus' western twilight zone. There are two parallel ranges, the "Lesser Eternities" to the north and the "Greater Eternities" to the south; the Lesser Eternities separate the American zone of settlement on Venus from the British zone to the south. (Parasite Planet)
- Nivia — "City of Snows" (from Latin nix "snow"). First and principal settlement on Titan. (Flight on Titan, The Red Peri)
- Patrick's Peak — One of the Mountains of Eternity on Venus. A solar analysis station is located there. (The Red Peri)
- Phlegethon — River flowing through Venus' twilight zone. (Parasite Planet)
- Thyle — Orange desert region on Mars south of 60° S; divided into Thyle I (east) and Thyle II (west). An orange desert. (A Martian Odyssey)
- Venoble — British settlement in the cool country of Venus, founded by Patrick Burlingame, south of the Greater Mountains of Eternity. (Parasite Planet, The Lotus Eaters, The Planet of Doubt)
- White Desert — Desert on Io. (The Mad Moon)
- Young's Field — A rocket port in Long Island, New York, where the Hera crashed in 2110. Possibly named for the explorer Young. (Redemption Cairn)
- Xanthus — Orange desert on Mars between Mare Cimmerium and Mare Chronium. (Corresponds on albedo maps of Mars to Eridania; on those maps, Xanthus is a "canal" west of Eridania.) (A Martian Odyssey)

== Spaceships ==
- Aardkin — Dutch ship trading between Earth and Venus.
- Ares — First ship to fly to Mars.
- Gaea — Smithsonian-sponsored expedition ship to Uranus. (Planet of Doubt)
- Golden Flash — Claire Avery's racing rocket. (Redemption Cairn)
- Hera — Expedition ship to Europa, crashed by Jack Sands at Young's Field, Long Island. (Redemption Cairn)
- Hermes — Ship captured by pirates, blamed on the Red Peri. (The Red Peri)
- Limbo — Expedition ship to Pluto (The Red Peri)
- Lucrece — Ship captured by pirates, during which raid "Red" Perry Maclane was killed. (The Red Peri)
- Minos — Ship used by the Henshaw expedition to Europa. (Redemption Cairn)
- Red Peri — Pirate ship built by "Red" Perry Maclane. (The Red Peri)

== Things ==
- anerosis — madness resulting from insufficiency of breathable air (Redemption Cairn)
- Apogee race — rocket race around the Moon, won by Claire Avery in 2111 (Redemption Cairn)
- blancha — Also known as white fever, a hallucinatory fever endemic to Io's low latitudes. So called from the characteristic pallor of its victims. (The Mad Moon)
- blaster — Miniature atomic bomb, used in demolition, construction, and warfare (Redemption Cairn)
- Council of Berne — International conference in 2059 that determined that only the area of a planet actually explored on the ground could be claimed by the explorer's country. (The Planet of Doubt)
- cree — A medicinal moss found on Ganymede. (Tidal Moon)
- Cree, Inc. — A company cultivating the plant cree on Ganymede. (Tidal Moon)
- Curry Cup — prize for the Apogee race
- Cryptogamus Urani — Greenish-gray rope-like plant found on Uranus. (The Planet of Doubt)
- ferva — A plant found on Io, from which ferverin is extracted (The Mad Moon)
- ferverin — An alkaloid extracted from ferva, used against the blancha fever (The Mad Moon)
- flame-orchid — Gem found on Titan, possibly produced by a Titanian life form; made of a thermosensitive chromium boride which changes color in accordance with small temperature variations. (Flight on Titan)
- flame-pistol — A weapon, charged by a diamond, that releases its energy in a single incinerating blast of flame. (Parasite Planet, The Planet of Doubt, The Mad Moon)
- hexylamine — An addictive drug, possibly similar to amphetamine, used by some rocket pilots. (Redemption Cairn)
- Hocken Rocket — A form of rocket developed in the early 20th century that made interplanetary travel practical. (Flight on Titan)
- International Congress — Held in Lisle in 2020. Apportioned rights to the dark side of Venus among various national claimants. (The Lotus Eaters)
- Interplanetary — A large corporation with a near-monopoly on interplanetary travel. Faced investigations into shady stock dealings in 2111. (The Red Peri, Redemption Cairn)
- Ionian products — A skin-trading company on Io, said to have discovered a form of red cree there. (Tidal Moon)
- Joint Expedition of the Royal Society and the Smithsonian Institution for the Investigation of Conditions on the Dark Side of Venus — Exploratory expedition to the dark side of Venus conducted by Hamilton and Pat Hammond. (The Lotus Eaters)
- League — Interplanetary association with police powers, whose rockets are called upon in case of pirate attack. (The Red Peri)
- liver-leaf — Edible Europan plant-like growth, about the size of a hand. (Redemption Cairn)
- Neilan Drug — A pharmaceutical concern belonging to Gustavus Neilan, exploiting the Ionian ferva leaf. (The Mad Moon)
- nutsy — Edible Europan creature found in salt pools, neither plant nor animal, resembling a walnut. (Redemption Cairn)
- Planetary Trading Corporation — Also known as P.T.C. A corporation formed to trade in gold between Earth and a recently discovered civilization on Venus; after a bubble of speculation, its stock prices collapsed when it transpired that the Venusians lacked gold. (Flight on Titan)
- Smithsonian Expedition for the Determination of the Intensity of Cosmic Radiation in Extra-planetary Space — Scientific expedition into trans-Neptunian space by Solomon Nestor and Frank Keene. (The Red Peri)
- song-bush — Plant growing on Europa, whose leaves emit a melodic sound (Redemption Cairn)
- riblancha — Second spell of blancha fever, following a prolonged first attack. (The Mad Moon)
- transkin — Rubbery suit used by Venusian travellers in the Hotlands, to protect them from the ubiquitous, fast-growing, lethal molds. (The Parasite Planet)
- xixtchil — A Venusian plant, from whose pods a chemical compound with rejuvenative properties is extracted. (The Parasite Planet)
