= The Best of Stanley G. Weinbaum =

1974 collection of science fiction stories by Stanley G. Weinbaum

- First edition cover
- Author: Stanley G. Weinbaum
- Cover artist: Dean Ellis
- Language: English
- Series: Ballantine's Classic Library of Science Fiction
- Genre: Science fiction
- Publisher: Ballantine Books
- Publication date: 1974
- Publication place: United States
- Pages: xii + 306
- OCLC: 1013405
- Followed by: The Best of Fritz Leiber

The Best of Stanley G. Weinbaum is a collection of science fiction stories by Stanley G. Weinbaum, published in 1974 as an original paperback by Ballantine Books as a volume in its Classic Library of Science Fiction. The volume included an introduction by Isaac Asimov and an afterword by Robert Bloch. Ballantine reissued the collection twice in the later 1970s; Garland Publishing published a library hardcover edition in 1983, and Sphere Books released a UK market edition in 1977, under the title A Martian Odyssey and Other Stories. The original edition placed third in the 1975 Locus Poll for best genre collection.

== Contents ==
- "The Second Nova", Isaac Asimov
- "A Martian Odyssey" (Wonder Stories 1934)
- "Valley of Dreams" (Wonder Stories 1934)
- "The Adaptive Ultimate" (Astounding 1935)
- "Parasite Planet" (Astounding 1935)
- "Pygmalion’s Spectacles" (Wonder Stories 1935)
- "Shifting Seas" (Amazing 1937)
- "The Worlds of If" (Wonder Stories 1935)
- "The Mad Moon" (Astounding 1935)
- "Redemption Cairn" (Astounding 1936)
- "The Ideal" (Wonder Stories 1935)
- "The Lotus Eaters" (Astounding 1935)
- "Proteus Island" (Astounding 1936)
- "Stanley G. Weinbaum: A Personal Recollection", Robert Bloch

"The Adaptive Ultimate" originally appeared under the byline "John Jessel".

== Reception ==
Alexei and Cory Panshin were of the opinion that although the collection was important because it gave modern readers "the chance to see Weinbaum in context with this major collection of his short work," they felt that "the special power to command that Weinbaum once had no longer exists. What is left is, at best, no more than occasionally and tepidly amusing."
