= Saturn in fiction =

Depictions of the planet

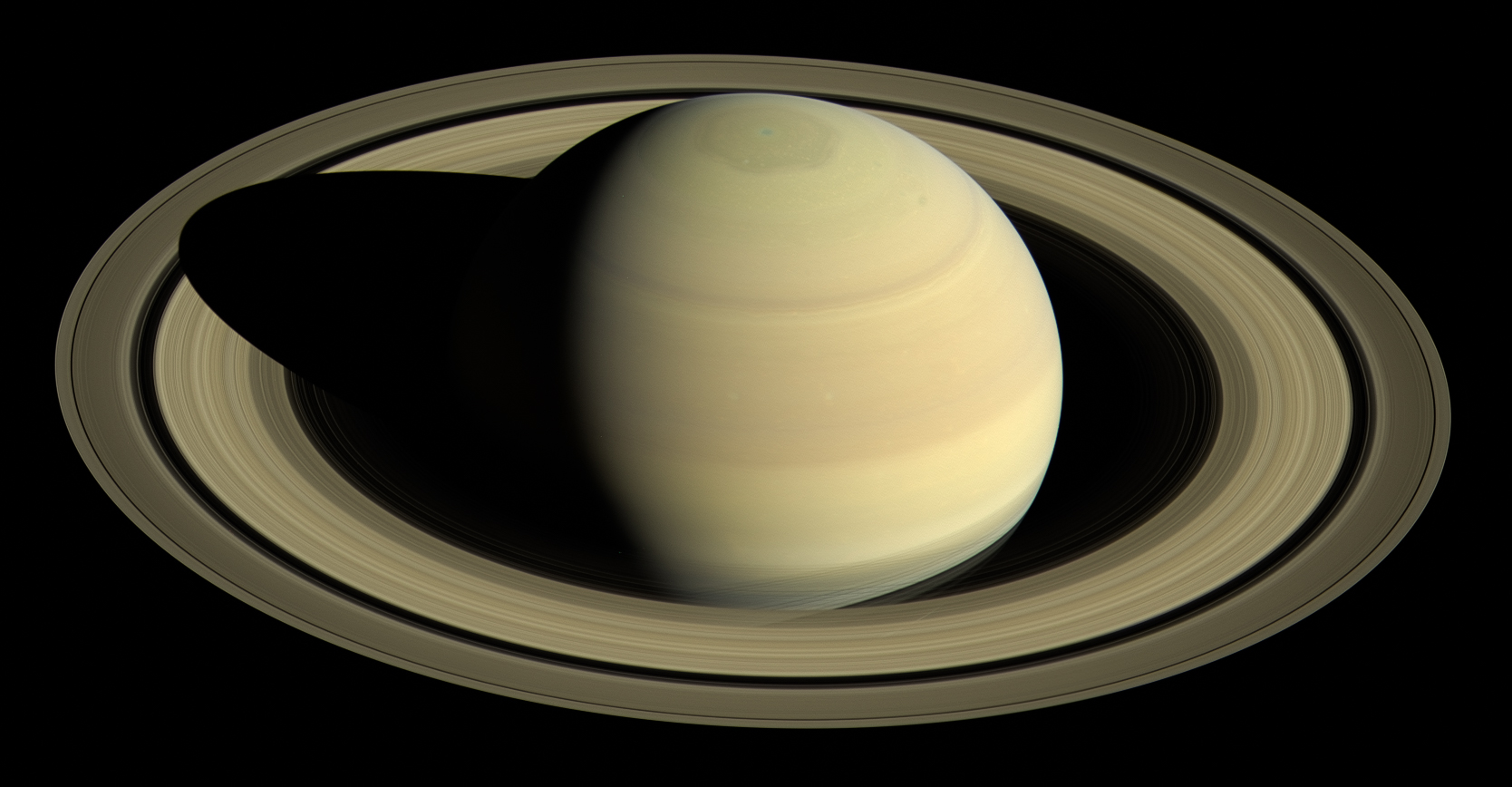
The visual appeal of the rings of Saturn makes the planet a popular location in fiction.

Saturn has made appearances in fiction since the 1752 novel Micromégas by Voltaire. In the earliest depictions, it was portrayed as having a solid surface rather than its actual gaseous composition. In many of these works, the planet is inhabited by aliens that are usually portrayed as being more advanced than humans. In modern science fiction, the Saturnian atmosphere sometimes hosts floating settlements. The planet is occasionally visited by humans and its rings are sometimes mined for resources.

The moons of Saturn have been depicted in a large number of stories, especially Titan with its Earth-like environment suggesting the possibility of colonization by humans and alien lifeforms living there. A recurring theme has been depicting Titanian lifeforms as slug-like.

== Saturn ==
=== Early depictions – solid ===
In all of these stories, one can discern no general image of the planet, except for the usual tendency to suspect its inhabitants are more advanced than humans.

— Gary Westfahl, Science Fiction Literature through History: An Encyclopedia, "Saturn" entry

For a long time, Saturn was incorrectly believed to be a solid planet capable of hosting life on its surface. The earliest depiction of Saturn in fiction was in the 1752 novel Micromégas by Voltaire, wherein an alien from Sirius visits the planet and meets one of its inhabitants before both travel to Earth. The inhabitants of Saturn have been portrayed in several different works since then, such as in Humphry Davy's 1830 novel Consolations in Travel and the anonymously published 1873 novel A Narrative of the Travels and Adventures of Paul Aermont among the Planets. They are occasionally portrayed as warlike yet benevolent, as in the 1935 short story "The Fall of Mercury" by Leslie F. Stone where they aid humanity in a war against Mercury and the 1933 short story "The Men without Shadows" by Stanton A. Coblentz where they come to Earth as conquerors in order to turn it into a utopia. In other works, they are evil, such as in Clifton B. Kruse's 1935 short story "Menace from Saturn" and its 1936 sequel "The Drums". In the 1890 novel The Auroraphone by Cyrus Cole Saturnians face a robot uprising, and in the 1900 novel The Kite Trust by Lebbeus H. Rogers they built the Egyptian pyramids.

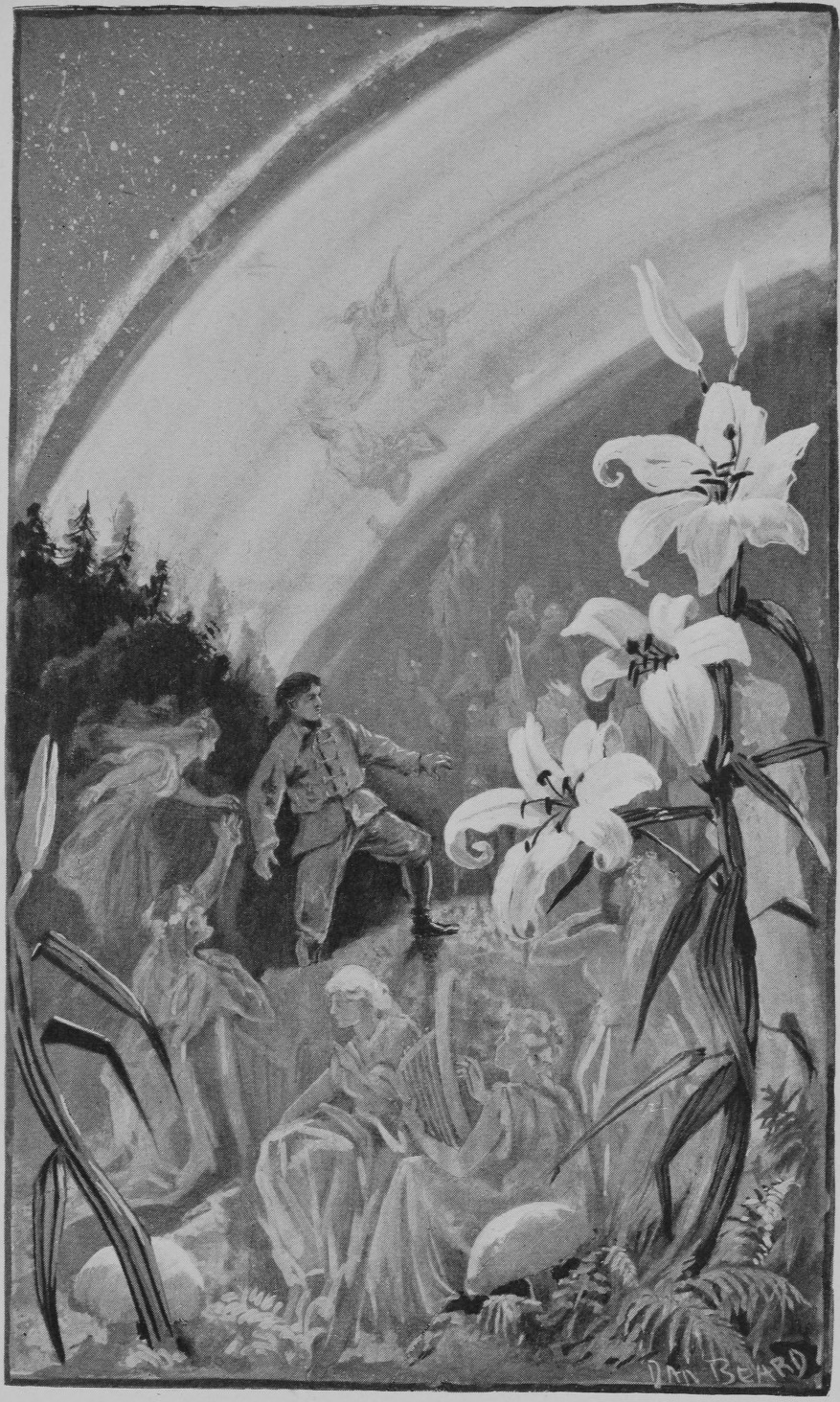
Characters on the surface of Saturn in A Journey in Other Worlds, with the rings visible in the sky

Saturnians are typically depicted as more advanced than the people of Earth, including in the 1886 novel A Romance of Two Worlds by Marie Corelli and the 1894 novel A Journey in Other Worlds by John Jacob Astor IV; in both stories they resolve theological questions. Exceptions to this general trend include the 1886 novel Aleriel, or A Voyage to Other Worlds by W. S. Lach-Szyrma where the planet's ecosphere is dominated by fungi and invertebrates and the 1901 novel A Honeymoon in Space by George Griffith where it is populated by seaweed, reptiles, and primitive humanoids. Saturn is also sometimes portrayed as devoid of life, as in the 1936 short story "Mad Robot" by Raymond Z. Gallun. Humanity takes refuge on Saturn in the 1935 short story "Earth Rehabilitators, Consolidated" by Henry J. Kostkos, and the first crewed voyage to Saturn by humans is depicted in the 1941 short story "Man of the Stars" by Sam Moskowitz.

=== Later depictions – gaseous ===
Once it was established that Saturn is a gaseous planet, most works depicting such an environment were instead set on Jupiter. Nevertheless, Saturn remains a popular setting in modern science fiction for several reasons including its atmosphere being abundant with sought-after helium-3 and its magnetosphere not producing as intense radiation as that of Jupiter. Humans live in floating cities in Saturn's atmosphere in the 1976 novel Floating Worlds by Cecelia Holland and the 1991 novel The Clouds of Saturn by Michael McCollum. A voyage into the atmosphere is depicted in the 1985 short story "Dreadsong" by Roger Zelazny, and aliens are depicted as living in the atmosphere in the 1997 novel Saturn Rukh by Robert L. Forward. In the 1996–1999 The Night's Dawn Trilogy by Peter F. Hamilton, Saturn is a place where biological spaceships are created. Both Saturn and its largest moon Titan are visited in Ben Bova's Grand Tour series in the 2003 novel Saturn and the 2006 novel Titan, respectively.

In cinema, Saturn is visited by means of a recovered alien spacecraft in the 1968 film The Bamboo Saucer, serves as the destination for a nature reserve containing post-apocalyptic Earth's remaining plant life in the 1972 film Silent Running, and is devoured by Galactus in the 2007 film Fantastic Four: Rise of the Silver Surfer. The planet has also been featured in several comic books; the DC hero Jemm is from Saturn, and the evil Kronans in Marvel's Thor comics have a base there. Saturn appears as a major location in the role-playing games Jovian Chronicles, Transhuman Space, and Eclipse Phase, as well as the video games System Shock and Dead Space 2.

=== Rings ===
The rings of Saturn are mined for resources in several works; they are a source of ice in Isaac Asimov's 1952 short story "The Martian Way" and the 1981 short story "The Iceworm Special" by Joe Martino, and provide raw material for a weapon in the 1935 short story "Menace from Saturn" by Clifton B. Kruse. One of the rings is painted red by a religious group in the 1977 short story "Equinoctial" by John Varley, while another faction seeks to undo the colour change. In Asimov's 1986 novel Foundation and Earth, the rings allow for positive identification of the Solar System in the far future. Owing to the aesthetic appearance of the rings, the vicinity of Saturn is a popular setting for spacecraft in visual media.

== Moons ==
Saturn's moons, especially Titan, have generally received more attention from writers than the planet itself. The satellite system hides a large circular sentient artificial world in John Varley's 1979–1984 Gaea trilogy that begins with the novel Titan.

=== Titan ===
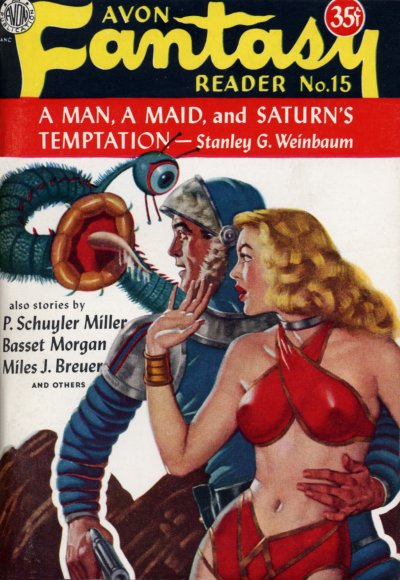
March 1951 cover of Avon Fantasy Reader, featuring Stanley G. Weinbaum's "Flight on Titan" (here under the variant title "A Man, A Maid, and Saturn's Temptation") and its telepathic Titanian threadworm

As a comparatively Earth-like world, Titan has attracted attention from writers as a place that could be colonized by humans and inhabited by extraterrestrial life. Early depictions of native inhabitants of the moon appear in the form of giant protozoa in Bob Olsen's 1932 short story "Captain Brink of the Space Marines" and enormous thinking spiders in Edwin K. Sloat's 1932 short story "Loot of the Void". Stanley G. Weinbaum's 1935 short story "Flight on Titan" features telepathic threadworms, the first appearance of what would later become a recurring image of Titanian life as similar to terrestrial slugs. The 1941 novel Sojarr of Titan by Manly Wade Wellman tells the tale of a human child who grows up orphaned on Titan, inspired by Edgar Rice Burroughs' Tarzan books.

Titan became more popular as a setting for science fiction stories in the 1950s as advances in planetary science revealed the harsh conditions of Mars and Venus. The 1951 novel The Puppet Masters by Robert A. Heinlein tells the story of an alien invasion by parasitic mind-controlling "slugs" from Titan that can be defeated only by a plague from the jungles of Venus, and slug-like aliens from Titan exert indirect influence on humans on Earth by having them play games in the 1963 novel The Game-Players of Titan by Philip K. Dick. The colonization of Titan is depicted in the 1954 novel Trouble on Titan by Alan E. Nourse, the 1961 short story "Saturn Rising" by Arthur C. Clarke depicts efforts to attract tourists to the moon, and the 1975 novel Imperial Earth by Clarke portrays a clone who lives on a Titan colony and journeys to Earth. The 1959 novel The Sirens of Titan by Kurt Vonnegut is a satire wherein humans are manipulated into journeying to Titan to aid a Tralfamadorian stranded there, and the moon is inhabited by an alien lifeform who travelled to the Solar System to communicate with the Sun in the 1977 novel If the Stars are Gods by Gregory Benford and Gordon Eklund.

The flybys of the Saturnian system by the Voyager probes in 1980 and 1981 revealed that Titan's atmosphere—already known to be thick and methane-rich—was opaque, preventing any observations of (or indeed, from) the surface. Following this, science fiction writers' interest waned, and Titan was more often portrayed as one location among many in the outer Solar System rather than being the primary focus. The terraforming of Titan appears as a background element in stories such as Kim Stanley Robinson's 1985 novel The Memory of Whiteness and his 1996 novel Blue Mars, while a previously terraformed Titan that has reverted to its natural state appears in Stephen Baxter's 1994 novel Ring. A voyage to Titan is portrayed in the 1997 hard science fiction novel Titan by Baxter.

=== Other moons ===
Tethys is inhabited by intelligent life in the 1934 short story "A Matter of Size" by Harry Bates. Rhea is colonized by humans in the 1956 novel The Stars My Destination by Alfred Bester. The 1954 novel The Secret of Saturn's Rings by Donald A. Wollheim and the 1958 novel Lucky Starr and the Rings of Saturn by Isaac Asimov are both set partially on Mimas. Iapetus is the site of an alien artefact in Arthur C. Clarke's 1968 novel 2001: A Space Odyssey (the film version from the same year instead uses Jupiter), a voyage to the moon is depicted in Poul Anderson's 1981 short story "The Saturn Game", and first contact with an alien species happens there in the 1986 novel Saturnalia by Grant Callin. In the 2005 novel Pushing Ice by Alastair Reynolds, Janus is revealed to be an alien spacecraft. Following the discovery of liquid water beneath the surface of Enceladus, the moon featured in the 2016 short story "The Water Walls of Enceladus" by Mercurio D. Rivera.

== See also ==
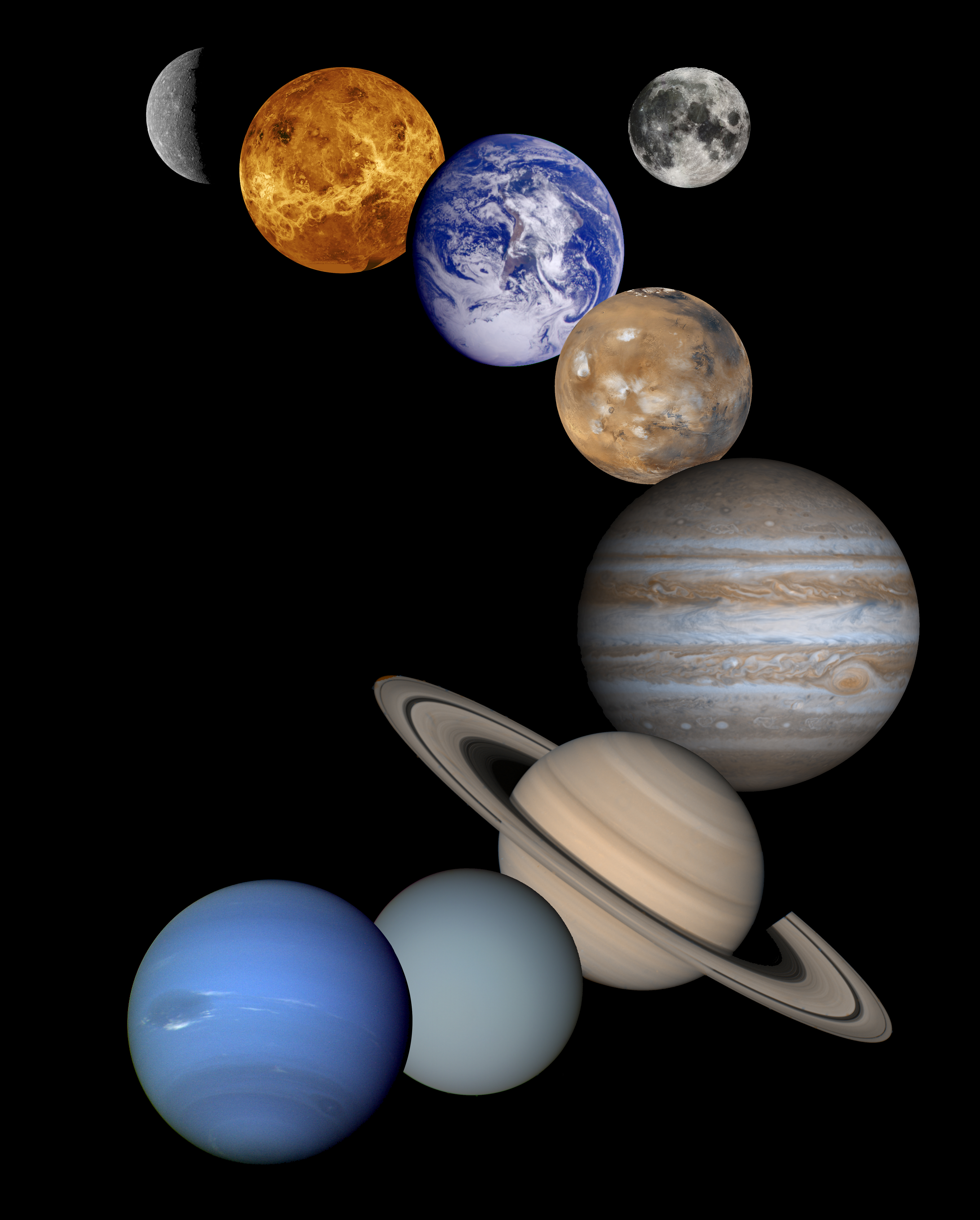
Clicking on a planet leads to the article about its depiction in fiction.

- Solar System in fiction
- Sun in fiction
