= Bug-eyed monster =

Stock character

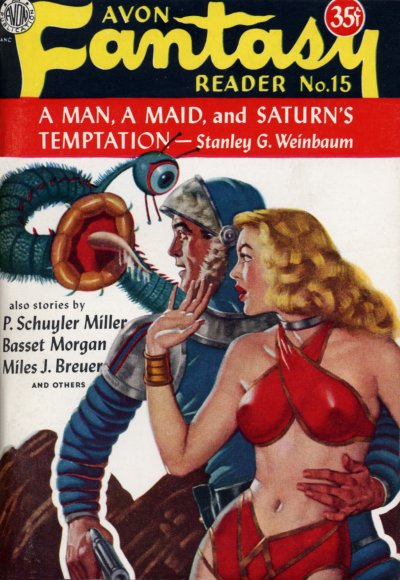
The Titanian Threadworm of Stanley Weinbaum's Flight on Titan, a type of BEM, cover, Avon Fantasy Reader, 1951

The bug-eyed monster (BEM) is an early convention of the science fiction genre. Extraterrestrials in science fiction of the 1920s through to the 1960s were often described (or depicted on covers of pulp magazines and in films) as grotesque creatures with huge, oversized or compound eyes and a lust for women, blood, or general destruction. Their ubiquity was such that authors and readers alike began referring to them as "bug-eyed monsters", "BEMs", or "bemmies". The biology of a typical bug-eyed monster (both in general terms and in terms of their invariable attraction to human women) was questionable, particularly in visual depictions.

In the contactee/abductee mythology, which grew up quickly beginning in 1952, the blond, blue-eyed, and friendly Nordic aliens of the 1950s were quickly replaced by small, unfriendly bug-eyed creatures, closely matching in many respects the pulp cover clichés of the 1930s which have remained the abductor norm since the 1960s.

== Popular culture ==
- William Tenn's The Flat-Eyed Monster (1955) is a story that effectively reverses the roles seen in a typical bug-eyed monster scenario. The human character, Clyde Manship, is teleported to a planet inhabited by "flefnobe" creatures with large eyes on their tentacles and clusters of smaller eyes in their bodies. In his efforts to get back to Earth, Manship develops an ability to kill flefnobes just by looking at them (as well as being innately able to intercept their telepathic communications but not send any of his own) and then goes on the run through one of their cities; the bug-eyed flefnobes' reaction to his escape attempt evokes the reactions of the human protagonists in a more typical BEM story, including describing Manship as the eponymous flat-eyed monster and urging each other to "blast it before it starts reproducing".
- When Doctor Who was created, the BBC producers stated that the show would be a "hard" science fiction show, and there would be no bug-eyed monsters – a policy explicitly stated by show creator Sydney Newman. Writer Terry Nation created the Daleks for the show's second serial, with their design resembling a bug-eyed monster much to Newman's disapproval. While Verity Lambert insisted to Newman that the Daleks were not in fact bug-eyed monsters, Nation himself would describe them as being so. The Daleks' subsequent popularity with viewers would pave the way for other BEM-type monsters to appear throughout Doctor Who's history.
- In "What Is This Thing Called Love?", Isaac Asimov's parody of both pulp fiction and the bug-eyed monster idea, a woman captured by aliens for the purposes of study keeps using the term when referring to her captor.
- In "The Gap Cycle" of books by Stephen R. Donaldson, the alien creatures are referred to by the main characters as BEMs.

== See also ==
- Insectoid
