= She Devil (1957 film) =

1957 film by Kurt Neumann

- Theatrical release poster
- Directed by: Kurt Neumann
- Screenplay by: Kurt Neumann; Carroll Young
- Based on: the story "The Adaptive Ultimate" by Stanley G. Weinbaum
- Produced by: Kurt Neumann
- Starring: Mari Blanchard; Jack Kelly; Albert Dekker
- Cinematography: Karl Struss
- Edited by: Carl Pierson
- Music by: Paul Sawtell; Bert Shefter
- Color process: Black and white
- Production company: Regal Films
- Distributed by: 20th Century-Fox
- Release date: April 1957
- Running time: 77 minutes
- Country: United States
- Language: English

She Devil is a 1957 American widescreen science fiction horror film, shot in RegalScope, from Regal Films, that was produced, written, and directed by Kurt Neumann. The film stars Mari Blanchard, Jack Kelly, and Albert Dekker and was theatrically released by 20th Century-Fox on a double bill with Regal's Kronos.

She Devil is based on the science fiction short story "The Adaptive Ultimate" by Stanley G. Weinbaum.

== Plot ==
Dr. Dan Scott has developed a serum that cures the ills of animals on the theory that all living organisms can adapt to their environment when it comes to harmful situations, with a serum based on the most adaptive qualities in the fruit fly. He has tried it on cats, chimpanzees, and leopards, and the formula seems to work, curing pneumonia in a hamster, mending a broken spine of a cat and healing lacerations from a panther. One odd quality comes through in it changing the color of a leopard in one instance. Eager to try it on a human being, despite his mentor Dr. Richard Bach's many concerns, Scott finds a consenting patient in Kyra Zelas, a woman with a meek personality who is dying of tuberculosis.

The serum seems to cure her instantly. It also dramatically affects her personality. Kyra shows a flash of temper when it comes to the idea of living at Dan's house by asserting herself. She then runs into a shop and sees a man supplying a girl with plenty of money. She sees the man and knocks him out to steal his money before stealing a dress and then disguising her identity by willing her hair color to change from brunette to blonde. Bach immediately surmises that something is wrong with Kyra, particularly since her dress is seen in a newspaper about the robbery. They try to confront her about the serum’s effect on her, but she labels herself as afraid of nothing or anyone.

Scott falls in love with her for the way she is. At a party, however, Kyra seduces a guest, Barton Kendall. When his wife Evelyn objects, Kyra disguises her hair again and murders her. Bach theorizes that a fix to her pineal gland, which may have turned her into a "devil" due to the overstimulation of the drug, could help her. They try to drug her in her sleep, but she wakes up before they can carry out their plan and escapes them. Despite the attempts of Scott to tell Kendall about her personality, Kendall marries her, but she soon behaves monstrously toward him. She goads him to shoot her, but he tries to drive her to the hospital despite her showing that the wound to the shoulder healed up. When driving in high ground, she takes the wheel and causes Kendall to crash and die. Feigning sympathy for the woman they know killed her husband, the doctors enact a different plan. They wait for her to sleep and pump carbon dioxide in her room that leaves Kyra in an unconscious state, then perform surgery to reverse the serum's effect on her pineal gland, which also restores Kyra's terminal disease.

== Cast ==
- Mari Blanchard as Kyra Zelas
- Jack Kelly as Dr. Dan Scott
- Albert Dekker as Dr. Richard Bach
- John Archer as Barton Kendall
- Fay Baker as Evelyn Kendall
- Marie Blake as Hannah - the Housekeeper (as Blossom Rock)
- Paul Cavanagh as Sugar Daddy
- George Baxter as Store Manager
- Helen Jay as Blond Nurse
- Joan Bradshaw as Redhead
- X Brands as Police Officer
- Tod Griffin as Interne

== Reception ==
=== Critical response ===
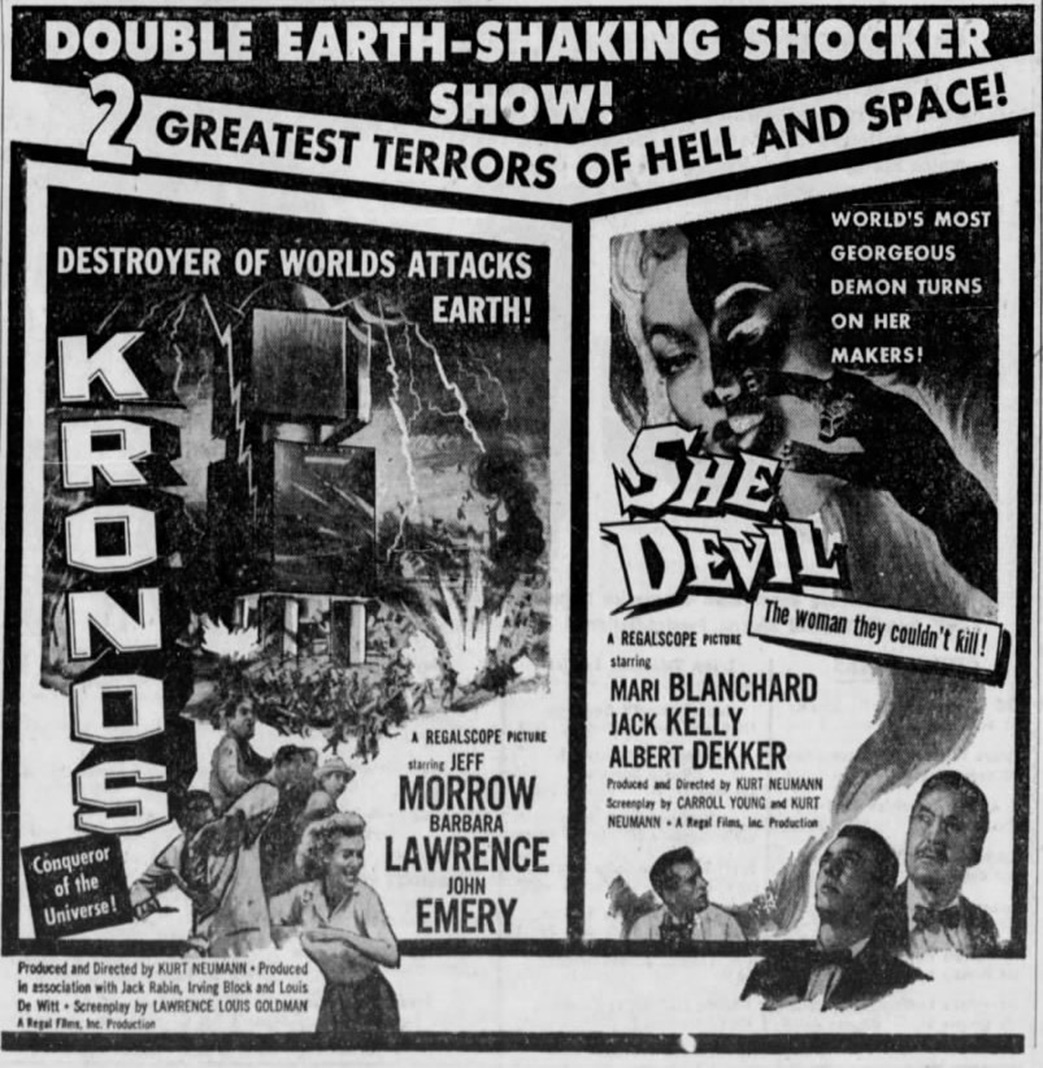
Advertisement from 1957 for She Devil and co-feature, Kronos

Film critic Glenn Erickson discussed the production in his review of the film, "The B&W 'Regalscope' format gives this modest production a handsome look, along with Kurt Neumann's competent if not stylish direction. Cameraman Karl Struss (of Murnau's Sunrise) slightly over-lights Kyra in the party scene to make her hair seem to glow, a subtle effect for sure. The hair-color changing is a filter trick, an invention Struss first used back in the silent era. A spectacular car crash murder scene is an RKO stock shot lifted from the 1952 Otto Preminger noir Angel Face and cropped for the 'scope format. It still looks frightening. Suggesting an undeveloped noir angle, a 'haunting' portrait of Kyra becomes the focus of Dan's obsession. It's supposed to be the work of an Italian master, but looks more like a Paint By Numbers atrocity."
