= Earthlight (novel) =

1955 novel by Arthur C. Clarke

- First edition (US)
- Author: Arthur C. Clarke
- Cover artist: Richard M. Powers
- Language: English
- Genre: Science fiction
- Publisher: Frederick Muller Ltd (UK); Ballantine Books (US)
- Publication date: 1955
- Publication place: United Kingdom
- Media type: Print (Hardcover & Paperback)
- Pages: 222
- ISBN: 0-15-127225-5
- OCLC: 389377
- Dewey Decimal: 823/.9/14
- LC Class: PZ3.C551205 Ear5 PR6005.L36

Earthlight is a science fiction novel by British writer Arthur C. Clarke, published in 1955. It is an expansion to novel length of a novella of the same name that he had published four years earlier.

== Overview ==
Earthlight is a science fiction adventure story set on the Moon, where a government agent is looking for a suspected spy at a major observatory on the Moon. The context is strong tension between Earth (which controls the Moon) and independent settlers elsewhere in the Solar System. The year is not given, but it is some time in the 22nd century. There have been no wars for the last 200 years.

The government agent is a mild-mannered accountant who does not like the task. He notices the beauty of the Moon under 'earthlight'; the Earth in the sky far bigger than the Moon in the skies of Earth.

The story climaxes in a space battle. There is also an apparent sighting of a 'beam of light', that should not be possible on the airless world. This is explained later in the story as a weapons beam that included metal particulates moving at high velocity.

Even though many of Clarke's science fiction novels take place in rather similar futures—Earthlight, A Fall of Moondust, The Sands of Mars, Rendezvous with Rama—the human background is never quite the same and they do not form a series.

== Plot summary ==
The plot describes how political tension between the government of a politically united Earth (which maintains sovereignty over the Moon) and independent settlers and traders elsewhere in the Solar System who have formed a federation, erupts into warfare over the terms for the availability to the Federation of scarce heavy metals.

The trigger for hostilities is the publication of a research paper suggesting that the Moon may have previously unsuspected heavy metal resources which Earth proposes to monopolise. The Earth government's intelligence agency suspects that confidential information concerning the exploitation of these mineral riches may be being leaked to the Federation and presses an accountant, Bertram Sadler, into service. Sadler is sent to the Moon's main astronomical observatory located near the crater of Plato as a tip off has suggested that information is being routed through that location. Sadler's cover story is that he is carrying out an investigation of waste in government spending.

The rising political tension is accompanied by the observatory staff enjoying the good fortune of observing a nearby supernova explosion in the constellation of Draco.

Despite a relatively long preceding era of peace, Earth and the Federation each prepare technologically for war. The Federation develops a new method of spacedrive propulsion while Earth develops new shielding technology and a weapon which uses an electromagnet-propelled bayonet of liquid metal. (The weapon mistaken for a beam of light).

A climactic battle between three Federation cruisers and the fortified mining installation ("Project Thor") is played out near Mount Pico close to the lunar observatory. Two astronomers who have delivered a top Earth scientist to Pico with only a couple of hours to spare, witness the battle. Sadler, whose investigations have had no pay off except for the unmasking of an embezzling store manager, relinquishes his cover by going to debrief the two astronomers.

Of the three Federal cruisers, two are destroyed along with the mine in the battle. The third cruiser, named The Acheron, is terminally damaged and retreats towards Mars, but has little chance of reaching it before her nuclear reactor explodes. However, her new drive gives her the capability of a rendezvous with a passenger liner, The Pegasus, which is able to rescue all but one of the crew who have to make the 40 second crossing without space suits.

This inconclusive duel between mother planet and formerly dependent colonists, with each side suffering stiffer resistance than anticipated, discredits the governments on both sides. Sadler is able to return to civilian life but suffers nagging frustration that he never found out whether the spy that he was searching for existed or not. Many years later the commander of the Acheron writes his memoirs and reveals that information had reached the Federation from "One of Earth's most distinguished astronomers, now living in honoured retirement on the Moon". With this hint, Sadler is able to confirm the spy's identity as Robert Molton, the first one of the observatory staff to greet him on his way to the observatory. The novel concludes with Molton enlightening Sadler and the reader as to the brilliant technical subterfuge with which he transmitted information, namely that he used the observatory's main telescope as a transmitter by placing a modulated ultra-violet source at its prime focus. The signal was received by a Federation spaceship a few million kilometers away.

== Reception ==
Groff Conklin characterized Earthlight as "a fairly standard type of melodrama [but] developed with all of the author's abundant ability to make even melodrama plausible." Floyd C. Gale stated that the novel had "some of the most inspired descriptive writing in or out of science fiction ... a thoroughgoing delight ... Worth reading and rereading". Anthony Boucher praised the novel as a convincingly real, scientifically detailed story of the near future, yet infused with that sense of wonder and excitement that we sometimes think vanished from literature about the time our voices changed."

At the time of the film 2001: A Space Odyssey, Lester del Rey expressed regret in his review of the film that Earthlight had not been filmed instead.

The weapon developed in the story by Earth, which uses an electromagnet-propelled bayonet of liquid metal, is said to have inspired DARPA to develop a weapon along the same lines.

== Notes ==
Earthlight was first published in 1955, in the US by Ballantine Books and in the UK by Frederick Muller Ltd, and was last printed as a paperback in New York by Del Rey in 1998, ISBN 0-345-43070-0. It was later republished in an omnibus edition including Islands in the Sky, Earthlight and The Sands of Mars and called "The Space Trilogy".

The space battle in Earthlight is the only time Clarke wrote such a scene, and it was intended as a specific homage to the attack on the Mardonalian fortress in chapter seven of E. E. Smith's Skylark Three. The scene where the crew of the Acheron have to cross to the Pegasus without space suits was inspired by Stanley G. Weinbaum's "The Red Peri".

The crew of Apollo 15 named several craters near their landing site at Hadley–Apennine for science fiction novels and one was named Earthlight, for Clarke's book. Clarke was delighted to receive a three-dimensional map of the landing site signed and sent by the Apollo 15 crew, two decades after the novel was written.
