= The Best of Fritz Leiber =

1974 collection of short stories by Fritz Leiber

- Cover of the first edition of The Best of Fritz Leiber
- Author: Fritz Leiber
- Cover artist: Tony Roberts
- Language: English
- Series: Ballantine's Classic Library of Science Fiction
- Genre: Fantasy, science fiction and horror
- Publisher: Sphere Books
- Publication date: 1974
- Publication place: United Kingdom
- Media type: Print (paperback)
- Pages: 368
- ISBN: 0-7221-5474-7
- Preceded by: The Best of Stanley G. Weinbaum
- Followed by: The Best of Henry Kuttner

The Best of Fritz Leiber is a collection of short stories by American writer Fritz Leiber. It was first published in the United Kingdom by Sphere Books in paperback in May 1974, and in the United States in hardcover by Doubleday in June 1974; a British hardcover and American paperback followed in November of the same year from Sidgwick & Jackson and Ballantine Books (as a volume in its Classic Library of Science Fiction), respectively. The Sphere edition was reprinted in June 1977, and the Ballantine edition in September 1979.

== Summary ==
The collection contains twenty-two fantasy, science fiction and horror novelettes and short stories. The British and American editions differ slightly from each other. The former credits Angus Wells as editor; the latter neither lists an editor nor acknowledges the existence of the earlier edition. Both contain the same stories, but the British edition arranges these chronologically in the order of their original publication, while the American edition presents the novelette "Gonna Roll the Bones" first, out of its chronological order. The British edition also includes an introduction by the author and a bibliography of his published books as of 1973; the American edition substitutes a different introduction by Poul Anderson and an afterword by the author.

== Contents ==
British edition:

- "Introduction"
- "Sanity" (Astounding Science Fiction, Apr. 1944)
- "Wanted - An Enemy" (Astounding Science Fiction, Feb. 1945)
- "The Man Who Never Grew Young" (Night's Black Agents, 1947)
- "The Ship Sails at Midnight" (Fantastic Adventures, Sep. 1950)
- "The Enchanted Forest" (Astounding Science Fiction, Oct. 1950)
- "Coming Attraction" (Galaxy Science Fiction, Nov. 1950)
- "Poor Superman" (Galaxy Science Fiction, Jul. 1951)
- "A Pail of Air" (Galaxy Science Fiction, Dec. 1951)
- "The Foxholes of Mars" (Thrilling Wonder Stories, June 1952)
- "The Big Holiday" (The Magazine of Fantasy and Science Fiction, Jan. 1953)
- "The Night He Cried" (Star Science Fiction Stories, Feb. 1953)
- "The Big Trek" (The Magazine of Fantasy and Science Fiction, Oct. 1957)
- "Space-Time for Springers" (Star Science Fiction Stories No. 4, Nov. 1958)
- "Try and Change the Past" (Astounding Science Fiction, Mar. 1958)
- "A Deskful of Girls" (The Magazine of Fantasy and Science Fiction, Apr. 1958)
- "Rump-Titty-Titty-Tum-TAH-Tee" (The Magazine of Fantasy and Science Fiction, May 1958)
- "Little Old Miss Macbeth" (The Magazine of Fantasy and Science Fiction, Dec. 1958)
- "Mariana" (Fantastic Science Fiction Stories, Feb. 1960)
- "The Man Who Made Friends with Electricity" (The Magazine of Fantasy and Science Fiction, Mar. 1962)
- "The Good New Days" (Galaxy Science Fiction, Oct. 1965)
- "Gonna Roll the Bones" (Dangerous Visions, 1967)
- "America the Beautiful" (The Year 2000, 1970)
- "The Science Fiction and Fantasy Books of Fritz Leiber"

American edition:

- "The Wizard of Nehwon" (Poul Anderson)
- "Gonna Roll the Bones" (1967)
- "Sanity" (1944)
- " Wanted - An Enemy" (1945)
- " The Man Who Never Grew Young" (1947)
- "The Ship Sails at Midnight" (1950)
- "The Enchanted Forest" (1950)
- "Coming Attraction" (1950)
- "Poor Superman" (1951)
- "A Pail of Air" (1951)
- "The Foxholes of Mars" (1952)
- "The Big Holiday" (1953)
- "The Night He Cried" (1953)
- "The Big Trek" (1957)
- "Space-Time for Springers" (1958)
- "Try and Change the Past" (1958)
- "A Deskful of Girls" (1958)
- "Rump-Titty-Titty-Tum-TAH-Tee" (1958)
- "Little Old Miss Macbeth" (1958)
- "Mariana" (1960)
- "The Man Who Made Friends with Electricity" (1962)
- "The Good New Days" (1965)
- "America the Beautiful" (1970)
- "Afterword"

== Awards ==
The book won the 1975 Locus Poll Award for Best Single Author Collection. The story "Gonna Roll the Bones" won both the 1967 Nebula Award and the 1968 Hugo Award for Best Novelette.

== Night Shade edition ==
As of July 5, 2009, Night Shade Press was planning a new Leiber collection to be issued under the same title, but covering the whole of his writing career through his death in 1992. Publication was projected for 2010. It was eventually published under the title Selected Stories which itself won the Locus Award for Best Collection in 2011.

== Sources ==
- The Best of Fritz Leiber title listing at the Internet Speculative Fiction Database
