= The Red Peri (collection) =

1952 short story by Stanley G. Weinbaum

- Dust-jacket from the first edition
- Author: Stanley G. Weinbaum
- Cover artist: John T. Brooks
- Language: English
- Genre: Science fiction
- Publisher: Fantasy Press
- Publication date: 1952
- Publication place: United States
- Media type: Print (hardback)
- Pages: 252
- OCLC: 2338364

The Red Peri is a collection of science fiction short stories by American writer Stanley G. Weinbaum. It was first published in 1952 by Fantasy Press in an edition of 1,732 copies. The stories originally appeared in the magazines Amazing Stories, Astounding and Thrilling Wonder Stories.

== Contents ==
- "Smothered Seas" (with Ralph Milne Farley)
- "Revolution of 1950" (with Ralph Milne Farley)
- "The Red Peri"
- "Proteus Island"
- "The Brink of Infinity"
- "Shifting Seas"
- "Flight on Titan"
- "Redemption Cairn"

== Reception ==
Boucher and McComas, although noting that The Red Peri was "a collection of Weinbaum's lesser work", still praised it as an interesting selection of work from "one of the most original and stimulating forerunners of contemporary science fiction." P. Schuyler Miller, similarly noting that Weinbaum's best work had already been collected in A Martian Odyssey and Others, found nevertheless that "Any of these stories would stand up today."
