= A Martian Odyssey and Others =

- Dust-jacket from the first edition
- Author: Stanley G. Weinbaum
- Cover artist: A. J. Donnell
- Language: English
- Genre: Science fiction short stories
- Publisher: Fantasy Press
- Publication date: 1949
- Publication place: United States
- Media type: Print (hardback)
- Pages: 289 pp
- OCLC: 2320042

A Martian Odyssey and Others is a collection of science fiction short stories by author Stanley G. Weinbaum. It was first published in 1949 by Fantasy Press in an edition of 3,158 copies. The stories originally appeared in the magazines Wonder Stories, Astounding and Thrilling Wonder Stories.

== Contents ==
- "A Martian Odyssey"
- "Valley of Dreams"
- "The Adaptive Ultimate"
- "The Mad Moon"
- "The Worlds of If"
- "The Ideal"
- "The Point of View"
- "Pygmalion's Spectacles"
- "Parasite Planet"
- "The Lotus Eaters"
- "The Planet of Doubt"
- "The Circle of Zero"

== Reception ==
Time magazine, using the collection as a springboard for a broader discussion of the sf genre, concluded that "The reader who reads science fiction dispassionately is likely to be struck by how closely the human imagination is tied to reality, even when it deliberately sets out to violate it. Stanley Weinbaum's loonies and slinkers have been seen before. The shapes may be different, but his dream-beasts come startlingly close to what the human race has been running across, for a good many years, in its childish nightmares."
