= The Mad Moon =

- Short story by Stanley G. Weinbaum
- Country: United States
- Language: English
- Genre: Science fiction

Publication
- Published in: Astounding Stories
- Publication type: Periodical
- Publisher: Street & Smith
- Media type: Print (Magazine)
- Publication date: December 1935

"The Mad Moon" is a science fiction short story by American writer Stanley G. Weinbaum, first published in the December 1935 issue of Astounding Stories. As did his earlier stories "A Martian Odyssey" and "Parasite Planet", "The Mad Moon" emphasizes Weinbaum's alien ecologies. "The Mad Moon" was the only Weinbaum story set on Io.

== Plot summary ==
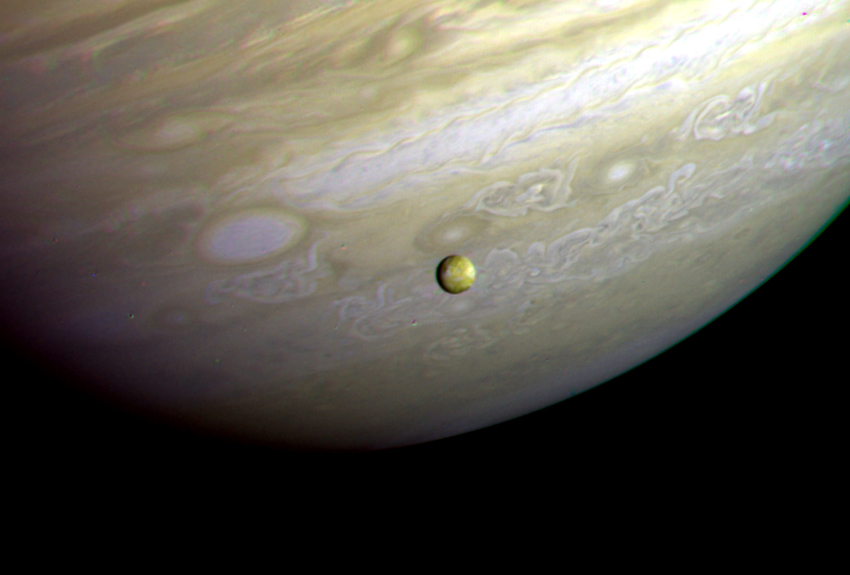
Jupiter and Io

It is the 22nd century and protagonist Grant Calthorpe is a former sport-hunter collecting ferva leaves for the Neilan Drug Company, living near the Idiots' Hills with a parcat named Oliver. To evade stinging palms in the Ionan jungle, he rewards loonies with chocolate to collect the ferva leaves for him.

One day, suffering the native "white fever" and its "attendant hallucinations", Calthorpe follows Oliver to Lee Neilan, daughter of the owner of Neilan Drug, also affected by the fever. Each human believes the other a hallucination, until Calthorpe confirms her report of a newly built slinker settlement, whereupon he rescues her from the local slinkers. Having restored her health, he learns that she had crash-landed an aircraft against the Idiots' Hills while trying to reach Herapolis.

When a party of slinkers undermines his shack, Calthorpe and Neilan flee into the Idiots' Hills, hoping the slinkers cannot follow them into the rarefied atmosphere. In a narrow valley between two peaks, they find a deserted city, apparently built by more-civilized previous generations of loonies. When opposed by the modern loonies, the slinkers form a narrow, dense mob, which Calthorpe destroys with a "flame pistol". This attracts Lee Neilan's father Gustavus, himself in search of her, and effects reunion. In gratitude to Calthorpe for saving his daughter, Gustavus offers him charge of a ferva plantation near Junopolis; whereupon Lee proposes her own marriage to Calthorpe.

== Weinbaum's Io ==
In Weinbaum's Solar System, Jupiter radiates enough heat to create Earthlike environments on the Galilean moons. Io, the innermost Galilean satellite, has a tropical climate, so that two human settlements are located at the poles, Junopolis in the north and Herapolis in the south. Extending partway around the equator are the Idiots' Hills, whose peaks extend beyond Io's "dense but shallow" atmosphere. Weinbaum was ignorant that Io is tidally locked, and therefore showed Jupiter rise and set during the story.

Two intelligent races are native to Io: the loonies, a humanoid race of only moderate intelligence with large balloonlike heads upon long, slim necks, and the rodentine, warlike slinkers. (Members of the Harrison Expedition to Mars encounter a slinker in the story "Valley of Dreams".) Another native is the parcat, a feline-like animal with a "single hind leg" and the ability to mimic phrases of human conversation. Ionan flora includes ferva leaves, used by pharmaceutical companies on Earth to create alkaloids; bleeding-grass, which exudes red sap; and stinging palms, named for venomous barbs.

== Collections ==
"The Mad Moon" appears in the following Stanley G. Weinbaum collections:

- The Dawn of Flame (1936)
- A Martian Odyssey and Others (1949)
- A Martian Odyssey and Other Science Fiction Tales (1974)
- The Best of Stanley G. Weinbaum (1974)
- Interplanetary Odysseys (2006)
