= The Sands of Mars =

1951 novel by Arthur C. Clarke

- Dust-jacket from the first edition
- Author: Arthur C. Clarke
- Language: English
- Genre: Science fiction
- Publisher: Sidgwick & Jackson
- Publication date: 1951
- Publication place: United Kingdom
- Media type: Print (Hardback & Paperback)
- Pages: 219

The Sands of Mars (also titled Sands of Mars) is a science fiction novel by English writer Arthur C. Clarke. While he was already popular as a short story writer and as a magazine contributor, The Sands of Mars was also a prelude to Clarke's becoming one of the world's foremost writers of science fiction novels. The story was published in 1951, before humans had achieved space flight. It is set principally on the planet Mars, which has been settled by humans and is used essentially as a research establishment. The story setting is that Mars has been surveyed but not fully explored on the ground. The Sands of Mars was Clarke's first published novel.

== Plot summary ==
Martin Gibson, a famous science fiction author, is travelling to Mars, as a guest of the crew of the spaceship Ares. After arriving at Space Station One, in the orbit of Earth, from which all interplanetary journeys start, he begins the three-month trip to Mars.

The youngest crew member, Jimmy Spencer, who is still in training to be an astronaut, is assigned the task of answering his questions about the technology of space flight, and they become friends. Gibson tells him about his early life, revealing that he had to leave Cambridge University because of a nervous breakdown and never completed his studies. After psychiatric treatment, he had become an author. He also reveals that he had an affair at university but that he and his girlfriend broke up and that she married another man, had a child and later died.

On Mars, Gibson and the crew go their separate ways. Gibson meets the Chief Executive of Mars, Warren Hadfield, and Mayor Whittaker, who run the colony from the base at Port Lowell. He discusses the future of the colony with Hadfield, who is keen to make Mars as self-sufficient as possible, given the vast distance that materials have to come from Earth.

On a trip by passenger jet to an outlying research station, Gibson and the crew are forced down by a dust storm. They explore the nearby area and discover a small group of kangaroo-like creatures, the unsuspected natives of Mars. They appear to have limited intelligence by human standards and are vegetarians, living on native plants.

It is later revealed that the plants are being cultivated by researchers to enrich the oxygen content of the Martian atmosphere. This project, and related others, are being kept secret from Earth.

Gibson discovers that Spencer is his son. In the meantime, Spencer has formed an attachment to Irene, Hadfield’s daughter.

Hadfield reveals that scientists have been working on "Project Dawn", which involves the ignition of the moon Phobos and its use as a second “sun” for Mars. It will burn for at least one thousand years and the extra heat, together with mass production of the oxygen-generating plants, will eventually – it is hoped – make the Martian atmosphere breathable for humans.

Gibson finds himself so persuaded of the importance of Mars as a self-sufficient world that he applies to stay on the planet, and is invited to take charge of public relations – in effect, to “sell” Mars to potential colonists.

== Reception ==
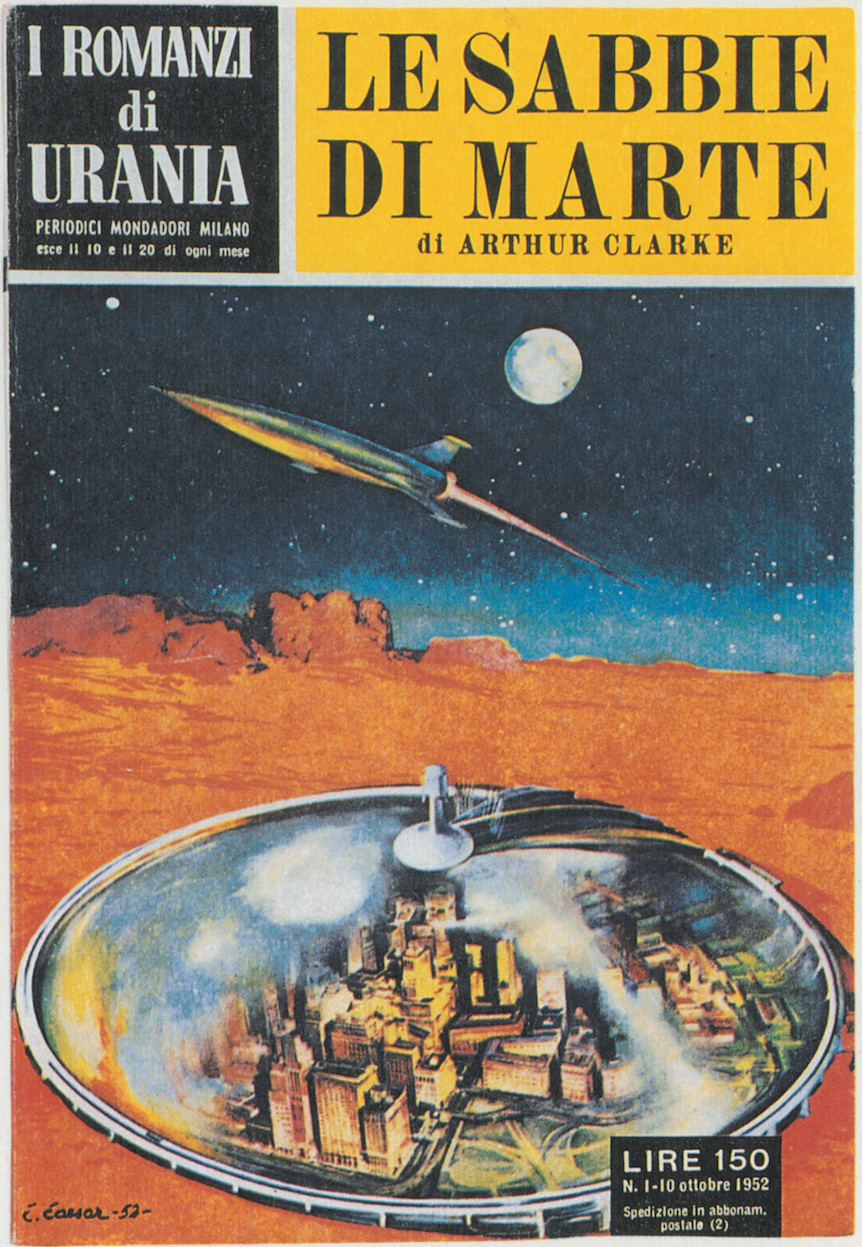
Italian edition. I Romanzi di Urania issue 1, Mondadori, 1952

J. Francis McComas, writing in The New York Times, declared Sands of Mars to be "a careful, thoughtful projection of the problems of government. . . . written with a quiet realism." Galaxy reviewer Groff Conklin described the novel as "genuinely good reading." Boucher and McComas found it "first-level science fiction for the intelligent and literate reader.". P. Schuyler Miller reported that although "the plot mechanism creaks a little, . . . [this] is one of the most believable trips to Mars."

== Notes ==
Clarke's vision of Mars was based on what was known or imagined in the 1950s. The Martian canals were long discredited, but it was not thought that Mars had mountains or craters. Seasonal changes visible from Earth were thought to be caused by vegetation of the sort the novel describes.

Some of the technology shown had not changed since the 1950s. For example, carbon paper and typewriters are used on the interplanetary ship, and cameras have film. Similarly the social structures are similar to the time Clarke was writing. While a woman engineer is mentioned, most of the females on Mars are assumed to be secretaries or receptionists and the only names given in the book are of European derivation.

The book was published later as part of The Space Trilogy, an omnibus of three of Clarke's earlier works which also includes Islands in the Sky and Earthlight.

A city on Mars named Port Lowell is also mentioned by Clarke in his 1955 short story "Refugee" and The Lost Worlds of 2001.

The transformation of Phobos into a second sun has similarities to what is done to Jupiter in Clarke's novel 2010: Odyssey Two. In that case, alien technology triggers a fusion reaction in the planet, which is largely hydrogen. In the case of Phobos - tiny and mostly rock - Clarke proposes an imaginary "meson resonance reaction" that has recently been discovered.

It has been claimed as an inspiration for the title of guitarist Jimi Hendrix's last and unfinished album, First Rays of the New Rising Sun. The album also contains an unfinished song "New Rising Sun" in which "Jupiter Sun" is mentioned.

== Timing ==
No dates are given, but Gibson's 20-year career began before anyone had been in space. The space age is stated to have begun in the 1960s and 1970s, implying that the novel takes place in the 1990s. The level of the development is consistent with what Clarke imagined for 2001 in 2001: A Space Odyssey. An expedition to Saturn is mentioned in The Sands of Mars: the book version of 2001 involves the first voyage there.

== Relations with other novels ==
Clarke's early space novels mostly foresee much the same sort of future, generally peaceful and with a benevolent world state. There are however no specific links between them, no repeat of fictional people or places. The current edition of The Sands of Mars appears in the same volume as Earthlight, but they are not definitely part of the same future. If they were, the Martian novel would be part of the past of the Lunar one, since humans in Earthlight have gone much further and the planets are now independent.

The idea of using a moon as a substitute sun was used by Pohl and Kornbluth in the 1959 novel Wolfbane.
