= Valley of Dreams =

- Short story by Stanley G. Weinbaum
- Country: United States
- Language: English
- Genre: Science fiction

Publication
- Published in: Wonder Stories
- Publisher: Gernsback Publications
- Media type: Magazine
- Publication date: November 1934

Chronology
- Series: Tweel
"A Martian Odyssey"	"The Red Peri"

"Valley of Dreams" is a science fiction short story by the American writer Stanley G. Weinbaum, originally published in the November 1934 issue of Wonder Stories. It was Weinbaum's second published story and is a sequel to his first, "A Martian Odyssey".

== Plot summary ==
Two weeks before the Ares is scheduled to leave Mars, Captain Harrison sends the American chemist Dick Jarvis and the French biologist "Frenchy" Leroy to retrieve the film that Jarvis took before his auxiliary rocket crashed into the Thyle highlands the week before. Along the way, the Earthmen stop at the city of the cart creatures and the site of the pyramid building creature for Leroy to take some samples. After picking up the film canisters from the crashed rocket, the two men fly east to look for signs of the birdlike Martian, Tweel.

Near a canal, the men find a vast, ancient, ruined, mostly deserted city. The main residents are a couple of hundred of Tweel's people, including Tweel himself, and Jarvis and the Martian enjoy a happy reunion. Jarvis persuades Tweel to guide them through the city.

In one building, they come across a ratlike being hunched over a Martian book (this species recurs in The Mad Moon). Tweel angrily chases the rat-thing away and replaces the book on a shelf, though the Earthmen are not sure whether the rat-thing was reading the book or eating it. Elsewhere in the building, which seems to be a library, the Earthmen see a huge mural of a human kneeling before a seated Martian. When Leroy remarks that the Martian in the mural looks like the Ancient Egyptian god Thoth, Tweel excitedly repeats the name, pointing to itself and all around them at the city. The Earthmen surmise that Tweel's people, the Thoth, had visited ancient Egypt and had been an inspiration for the Ibis-headed god. (This is actually anachronistic, since Thoth was the classical Greek version of the god's name.)

Over the next three days, Tweel shows the Earthmen around the city, including a solar-powered pumping station designed to move water down the canal. Finally, a mile south of the ancient Martian city, the Earthmen explore a valley, despite Tweel's urgent warnings. The valley is filled with dream-beasts. The dream-beasts show the two Earthmen everything they have ever desired. Both rush forward helplessly. Tweel attacks one of the dream-beasts, momentarily freeing Jarvis. The Earthman kills the dream-beast with a pistol shot, then kills another that is attacking Leroy, and the three of them flee from the valley.

Before returning to the Ares, as a parting gift, the Earthmen take Tweel to the wreck of the other rocket. Jarvis starts the atomic power plant, expecting the Thoth will be able to master atomic power and, no longer dependent on inefficient solar power to bring water from a polar ice cap, hopefully reverse the decline of their civilization.

== Collections ==
"Valley of Dreams" appears in the following Stanley G. Weinbaum collections:

- A Martian Odyssey and Others (1949)
- A Martian Odyssey and Other Science Fiction Tales (1974)
- The Best of Stanley G. Weinbaum (1974)
- Interplanetary Odysseys (2006)
