= Tidal Moon =

- Short story by Stanley G. Weinbaum and Helen Weinbaum
- Country: United States
- Language: English
- Genre: Science fiction

Publication
- Published in: Thrilling Wonder Stories
- Publication type: Periodical
- Publisher: Thrilling Publications
- Media type: Print (Magazine)
- Publication date: December 1938

"Tidal Moon" is a science fiction short story by American writer Stanley G. Weinbaum and Helen Weinbaum that first appeared in the December 1938 issue of Thrilling Wonder Stories and was reprinted in the collection Interplanetary Odysseys (2006). Sam Moskowitz stated that Stanley G. Weinbaum completed only a page and a half of the story before his death and that his sister Helen Weinbaum completed the story on her own. "Tidal Moon" is the only story by Weinbaum to take place on Ganymede.

== Plot summary ==
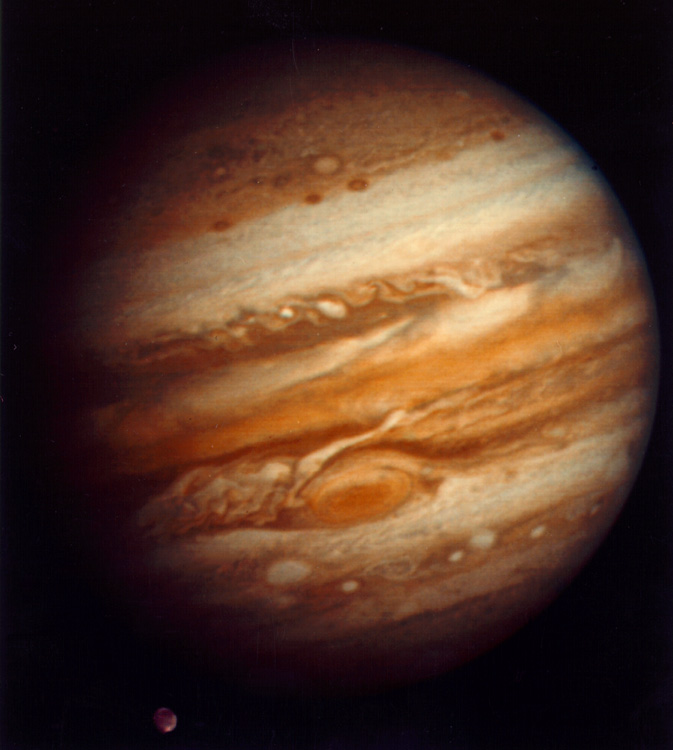
Jupiter and Ganymede.

Ben Amherst is a cree collector on Ganymede in the year 2083. Although he normally operates alone, he finds himself accompanied on one of his rounds by a tourist from Earth named Kirt Scaler. Scaler plans to travel with Amherst to the village of Aquia, then remain there for two months while Amherst continues on his rounds. Amherst finds Scaler strangely knowledgeable about conditions on Ganymede for someone who claims never to have left Earth before.

Reaching Aquia, Amherst and Scaler find that its chief trader, Carl Kent, has gone missing; his teenaged daughter Carol is carrying on in his place. Kent's disappearance is ominous since he has only recently worked out a process for distilling crephine from red moss. While Aquia is drowned in the flood, Scaler spends most of his time with Carol Kent.

A day and a half before the tide is due to ebb away from Aquia, Carol Kent discovers that her father's notes on his red moss distillation process are missing. Amherst remembers a rumour he heard that red moss has been discovered on Io; Scaler, he realizes, must be working for Ionian Products, a company seeking to break Cree, Inc.'s crephine monopoly. If they succeed, it will mean hard times for everyone on Ganymede. Aquia is searched for Scaler, to no avail. Suddenly one of the valves leading to the surface opens; Scaler is using it to escape Aquia with Carl Kent's notes. Amherst sends Kent to get him a vacuum suit; when she returns with it, she is wearing one herself. He tells her to remain in the settlement, but she ignores his order and follows him up the aqueduct.

On the still-half-flooded surface of Ganymede, there is no sign of Scaler, but Amherst and Kent see a rocket ship in the sky, coloured Ionian red. As the rocket nears the muddy ground, it lowers a ladder, then disappears behind a hill. When it reappears, a man is clinging to the ladder. It is Scaler, and Carl Kent's process is on its way to Io.

As they return to Aquia, Carol Kent tells Amherst about her father's process, which involves exposing red moss to ammonia and treating it with an extract from the eggs of Ganymedian gall-ants. Amherst is overjoyed: Ionian Products might have the process, but they don't have the gall-ants, and gall-ants can only breed on Ganymede. Carl Kent's notes will be worthless to the Ionians.

== Weinbaum's Ganymede ==
In Weinbaum's Solar System, Jupiter radiates enough heat to create Earthlike environments on the Galilean moons. Ganymede, the third Galilean satellite, has a subarctic climate, large bodies of water, and a six-month rotation period. Due to Jupiter's tidal pull, every spot on Ganymede's surface is inundated with water every three months except a small area of the south pole where the human settlement of Hydropole is located. The Ganymedian natives, the Nympus, grow a mosslike plant called cree which is ordinarily red, but which turns blue when exposed to the ammonia in Ganymede's atmosphere. The blue moss is collected by human traders in the employ of Cree, Inc. who travel among the native villages on an aquatic riding animal called a hipp (short for Hippocampus catamiti); it is then shipped to Earth to produce crephine, a combined anaesthetic and medicine. Other Ganymedian life-forms include the whale-like Gamma Rorqual, the tentacled land leet, and the four-winged Blanket Bat.
