= Coming Attraction =

- Short story by Fritz Leiber
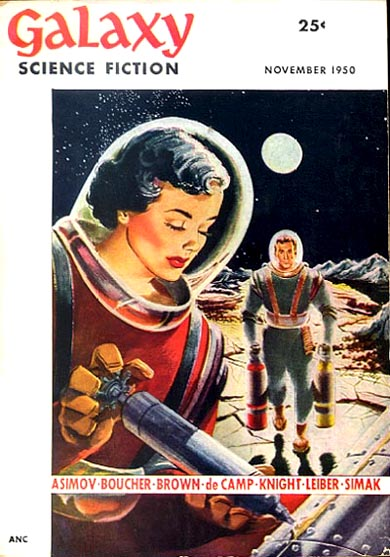
- Country: United States
- Language: English
- Genre: Science fiction

Publication
- Published in: Galaxy Science Fiction
- Publication type: Digest-size magazine
- Publication date: November 1950

"Coming Attraction" is a science fiction short story by American writer Fritz Leiber, originally published in the second issue (November 1950) of Galaxy Science Fiction with illustrations by Paul Callé. The story was nominated for a Retro Hugo Award in 2001.

== Plot summary ==
The story is set in Manhattan during a protracted war between the United States and the Soviet Union; midtown Manhattan has been rendered an uninhabitable wasteland by a Soviet "Hell Bomb," though the rest of the city is still occupied. The narrator is a British citizen named Wysten Turner, who is in New York to barter, in exchange for grain, electronic equipment that he suspects will be used in the construction of an American military base on the moon.

As the story begins, he pulls a young woman out of the way of a car; apparently it is a favorite gang activity to snag women's clothing with fishhooks welded to their cars' fenders, although this car came a bit too close. Turner involves the police, but they do not regard the incident as serious, and he ends up bribing them to go away. The wearing of masks, akin to the Muslim burka but carrying no religious significance, has become all but mandatory for fashionable American women. Turner therefore cannot see the face of the woman he has helped, and he is intrigued.

She arranges for him to meet her later, and they go to a nightclub. She begs him to help her escape America, explaining that her boyfriend, a professional wrestler, beats her when he loses a wrestling match. Turner's sense of chivalry is aroused, and a fight occurs when the boyfriend arrives. Turner, to his surprise, knocks the boyfriend down, but when he does, the girl turns on him rather than thanking him for defending her. Her quasi-seduction of Turner is a ploy she has used on other men in the past, as all those around her already know. She never intended to leave the wrestler, as she craves his abuse. Turner rips the mask from her face, but is repulsed by her lack of grooming and by her expression of hatred. He leaves, anxious to return to England.

== Reception ==
Coming Attraction was among the stories selected in 1970 by the Science Fiction Writers of America as one of the best science fiction short stories published before the creation of the Nebula Awards. As such, it was published in The Science Fiction Hall of Fame Volume One, 1929-1964. It has been anthologized and collected at least 25 times.

== Audio ==
The story, read by Paul Jenkins, is available on a digital download from Audible.com.

== Illustration ==
Paul Calle (1928-2010), illustrated the story for Galaxy.
