= Redemption Cairn =

- Short story by Stanley G. Weinbaum
- Country: United States
- Language: English
- Genre: Science fiction

Publication
- Published in: Astounding Stories
- Publication type: Periodical
- Publisher: Street & Smith
- Media type: Print (Magazine, Hardback & Paperback)
- Publication date: March 1936

"Redemption Cairn" is a science fiction short story by American writer Stanley G. Weinbaum that first appeared in the March 1936 issue of Astounding Stories. "Redemption Cairn" is the only Weinbaum story set on Europa.

== Plot summary ==
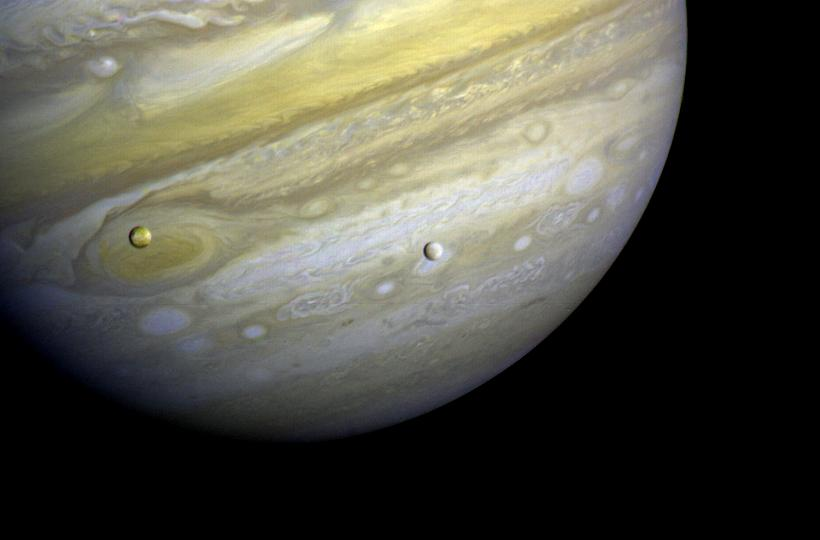
Jupiter, Europa and Io.

Jack Sands, the story's narrator, is a spaceship pilot down on his luck. In September 2111, he is about to be evicted from a flophouse when he is recruited by his old friend Captain Harris Henshaw to co-pilot an expedition to Europa. Sands is one of only two survivors of a previous visit to the Jovian moon. The other was his drug-addled co-pilot Kratska, who crashed the expedition's ship, the Hera, while landing it on Earth. While Sands lay unconscious in a hospital, Kratska put the blame for the crash on him, ruining his reputation. Kratska has since disappeared.

Sands' new co-pilot is Claire "The Golden Flash" Avery, whose sole qualification was winning the circumlunar Apogee race; more by sheer luck and suicidal risk-taking than by skill, in Sands' opinion. The other members of the expedition are the chemist Stefan Coretti and the biologist Gogrol.

Sands has proof of Avery's poor piloting ability during the landing on Europa, when he is forced to take over to prevent her from crashing the Minos. His suspicions are aroused when he realizes the crew of the Minos are doing no actual exploring.

One day, he and Avery return from gathering food to find Henshaw shot dead and Coretti wounded by Gogrol. The biologist forces the two pilots into the next valley and then crosses back over the airless ridge connecting them wearing an air helmet. He takes their helmets with him, so they can't follow. Avery then tells Sands the real purpose of the mission: Captain Gunderson of the Hera had discovered vast deposits of protactinium on the previous expedition, and worked out a process for using it as a power source. Gunderson was lost in the crash, along with his notes, but it was hoped that he had left a copy behind on Europa. Now Gogrol has found the notes.

Gogrol returns because he needs one of them to pilot the ship to one of the human settlements on Io. He shoots Sands in the leg and abducts Avery; when she passes out on top of the ridge, he picks her up and carries her, then tosses his pistol down to Sands with one shot left, so Sands can commit suicide. Instead, Sands shoots a native bladder bird and uses its air sac to keep breathing as he gives chase. He catches up to Gogrol in the darkened spaceship control room, finally recognizing him as Kratska. Sands sends Avery outside to retrieve Coretti; Kratska chooses that moment to attack Sands, but Sands manages to kill Kratska before passing out.

When Sands comes to, he is travelling in space aboard the Minos, which Avery has piloted to Io. Sands enters the control room in time to watch her make a perfect landing.

== Weinbaum's Europa ==
In Weinbaum's Solar System, in keeping with the then-current "near-collision" hypothesis of planetary formation, Jupiter radiates enough heat to create Earth-like environments on the Galilean moons. Europa is airless except for a depression on the Jupiter-facing side of the tidally locked moon, which holds a thin, but breathable atmosphere. This region is divided into a number of small valleys separated from each other by ridges rising above the atmosphere. The most widespread Europan species is the bladder bird, which carries its own air supply with it in an air sac, allowing it to cross over the airless peaks.

== Collections ==
"Redemption Cairn" appears in the following Stanley G. Weinbaum collections:

- The Red Peri (1952)
- A Martian Odyssey and Other Science Fiction Tales (1974)
- The Best of Stanley G. Weinbaum (1974)
- Interplanetary Odysseys (2006)
