= The Lotus Eaters (Weinbaum) =

- Short story by Stanley G. Weinbaum
- Country: United States
- Language: English
- Genre: Science fiction

Publication
- Published in: Astounding Stories
- Publication type: Periodical
- Publisher: Street & Smith
- Media type: Print (Magazine)
- Publication date: April 1935

Chronology
- Series: Ham Hammond
Parasite Planet	The Planet of Doubt

"The Lotus Eaters" is a science fiction short story by American writer Stanley G. Weinbaum originally published in the April 1935 issue of Astounding Stories. "The Lotus Eaters" was Weinbaum's fifth published story, and is a sequel to "Parasite Planet".

== Plot summary ==
A month after the events in "Parasite Planet", Hamilton "Ham" Hammond and Patricia Burlingame are married, and thanks to Burlingame's connections, the two have been commissioned by the Royal Society and the Smithsonian Institution to explore the night side of Venus. There they find a species of warm-blooded mobile plants with a communal intelligence that Burlingame nicknames Oscar. Oscar is very intelligent, quickly picking up English from Hammond and Burlingame.

The humans learn that the Oscar beings reproduce by releasing clear bubbles full of gaseous spores. When the bubbles burst, the spores come to rest on another Oscar being, eventually grow into another individual, and bud off. In "Parasite Planet", the vicious, night-dwelling Triops noctivivans used these bubbles to attack Hammond and Burlingame, since the spores have a soporific effect on humans.

The humans are horrified to learn that, being plants, the Oscar beings have no survival instinct. Despite their greater-than-human intelligence, the Oscar beings react with indifference when the local trioptes attack and consume them. This prompts Burlingame to name their species Lotophagi veneris – the lotus eaters of Venus. Hammond and Burlingame barely escape the trioptes themselves after exposure to the spores leaves them almost catatonic.

== Collections ==
"The Lotus Eaters" appears in the following Stanley G. Weinbaum collections:

- The Dawn of Flame (1936)
- A Martian Odyssey and Others (1949)
- A Martian Odyssey and Other Classics of Science Fiction (1962)
- A Martian Odyssey and Other Science Fiction Tales (1974)
- The Best of Stanley G. Weinbaum (1974)
- Interplanetary Odysseys (2006)

== Reception ==
Floyd C. Gale said in Galaxy Science Fiction in February 1960 that the story "gleams like new despite a quarter-century".
