= The Red Peri =

- Short story by Stanley G. Weinbaum
- November 1935 issue of Astounding Stories, where the story was originally published
- Country: United States
- Language: English
- Genre: Science fiction

Publication
- Published in: Astounding Stories
- Publication type: Periodical
- Publisher: Street & Smith
- Media type: Print (Magazine)
- Publication date: November 1935

"The Red Peri" is a science fiction novella by American writer Stanley G. Weinbaum, which first appeared in the November 1935 issue of Astounding Stories. Sam Moskowitz has noted that Weinbaum planned to write a series of sequels to "The Red Peri" but died before he could do so. "The Red Peri" is the only Weinbaum story set on Pluto. The novel also inspired Arthur C. Clarke, who stated that David Bowman's helmetless spacewalk in 2001: A Space Odyssey was inspired by Frank Keene's escape from the pirate base in "The Red Peri".

== Plot summary ==
Around the year 2080, the Dutch spaceship Aardkin out of Venus is approaching Earth when she is boarded by pirates from the notorious spaceship the Red Peri. Passenger Frank Keene, an American radiation engineer and spaceship pilot, sees that one of the pirates has red hair, before that pirate literally tweaks his nose and leaves.

A year later, Keene and astrophysicist Solomon Nestor are on board the Limbo, conducting a survey of cosmic radiation in the outer reaches of the Solar System for the Smithsonian Institution. When one of the Limbo's stern jets melts, they are forced to land on Pluto, in the hope of finding some refractory metal to build a new jet. Shortly afterwards, they are captured and taken to the secret lair of the pirates.

They meet the Red Peri herself, a nineteen-year-old redhead whose late father built the Red Peri and established the base sixteen years earlier. The Red Peri says she cannot let Keene and Nestor go, but is hesitant to kill them in cold blood. She ponders their fate.

One of their guards is a twenty-year-old blonde named Elza. Elza is in love with a fellow pirate named Marco Grandi who, to her dismay, is enamoured with the Red Peri. Keene enlists Elza's aid by promising to help her win Grandi's love.

The next morning, Elza tells him that the Red Peri has allowed him the run of the base; he has no access to a spacesuit or the key to his ship. The Red Peri takes him on a tour of the base, ending with a view of a cavern full of oxygen ice. There, Keene rescues his captor from a swarm of "crystal crawlers". When Keene's toe falls prey to one of them, the Red Peri quickly cuts off the infected area.

While treating Keene's toe, the Red Peri reveals that she is the daughter of Perry Maclane, an inventor who was cheated out of his patent by Interplanetary, Inc. Swearing revenge, Maclane built the Red Peri, crewed it with others who had also been wronged by the company, and began preying on its spaceships. When the elder Maclane died three years ago, Peri took his place. Her ultimate plan is to use the money she makes from piracy to start a rival spaceline and put Interplanetary out of business.

Meanwhile, Nestor has been plotting with Elza. Her father has been working on the Limbo, so she can get the key. When Nestor tells Keene his plan, Keene is divided. The next morning, after Elza slips him the key, Keene arrives at the base's entrance to find the Red Peri being loaded with supplies. Keene confesses his love for her and tries to persuade her to give up piracy, to no avail. He decides then that he will go along with Nestor's plan.

Keene jumps out through the electrostatic field that serves as an airlock, taking a surprised Maclane with him. Carrying her, Keene sprints a thousand feet in the frigid vacuum of Pluto to the Limbo, barely making it to the airlock. He launches the Limbo, then chains the unconscious Maclane to a chair. When she wakes up, he explains that stories of humans exploding in a vacuum are a myth—human tissue is strong enough to withstand the body's internal pressure for several minutes.

The Red Peri comes alongside the Limbo, but is unable to attack with Maclane on board. Keene falls asleep, and wakes to find Maclane and the Red Peri gone. A note explains that she used an iron-eating crystal crawler to free herself. Keene realizes she braved the vacuum of space by jumping from the Limbo's airlock to the Red Peri.

Keene is certain Maclane will set up another base somewhere else in the solar system. He decides to leave government service and get a job on an Interplanetary freighter. Eventually, their paths will cross again.

== Weinbaum's Pluto ==
"The Red Peri" was written only five years after the discovery of Pluto by Clyde Tombaugh, when the only things known about it were its orbit and the fact that its apparent magnitude was 14.90, too dim to be a gas giant. Given its known distance from the sun, this meant that the higher Pluto's albedo was assumed to be, the smaller it would have to be. Weinbaum assumed that Pluto's surface was as dark as coal, and that its diameter was greater than Earth's, with a correspondingly greater gravity. Weinbaum also assumed that Pluto was airless and had a twenty-hour period of rotation and a surface temperature of 10 kelvins. Despite its harsh conditions, Weinbaum's Pluto includes a number of life-forms, all of them crystalline creatures called crystal crawlers that consume various elements, including aluminum, iron, and carbon.

== Critical reception ==
Everett F. Bleiler reported that "the background is imaginative, but the romance is on the level of the shopgirl pulps, and the writing leaves much to be desired."

The scene where Keene journeys across 1000 feet of vacuum without a space suit was very influential for Arthur C. Clarke, who referenced it in three later works: Earthlight, "The Other Side of the Sky", and 2001: A Space Odyssey.

== Collections ==
"The Red Peri" appears in the following Stanley G. Weinbaum collections:

- The Dawn of Flame (1936)
- The Red Peri (1952)
- A Martian Odyssey and Other Science Fiction Tales (1974)
- Interplanetary Odysseys (2006)

The Project Gutenberg versions of "The Dawn of Flame" and "A Martian Odyssey" do not contain "The Red Peri". The full text of the novella is available here: https://web.archive.org/web/20121023021553/http://homepage.ntlworld.com/forgottenfutures/weinbaum/peri.htm
