= Flight on Titan =

- Short story by Stanley G. Weinbaum
- Country: United States
- Language: English
- Genre: Science fiction

Publication
- Published in: Astounding Stories
- Publication type: Periodical
- Publisher: Street & Smith
- Media type: Print (Magazine)
- Publication date: January 1935

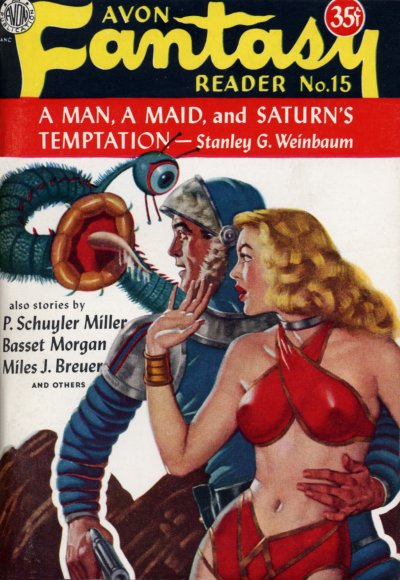
"Flight on Titan" was reprinted in 1950 under the title of "A Man, A Maid, and Saturn's Temptation".

"Flight on Titan" is a science fiction short story by American writer Stanley G. Weinbaum. It was the third story published by Weinbaum in his Planetary Series. Flight on Titan first appeared in the January 1935 issue of Astounding Stories, was the first of Weinbaum's to appear in Astounding Stories, and is the only story by him set on Saturn's largest moon, Titan.

== Plot summary ==
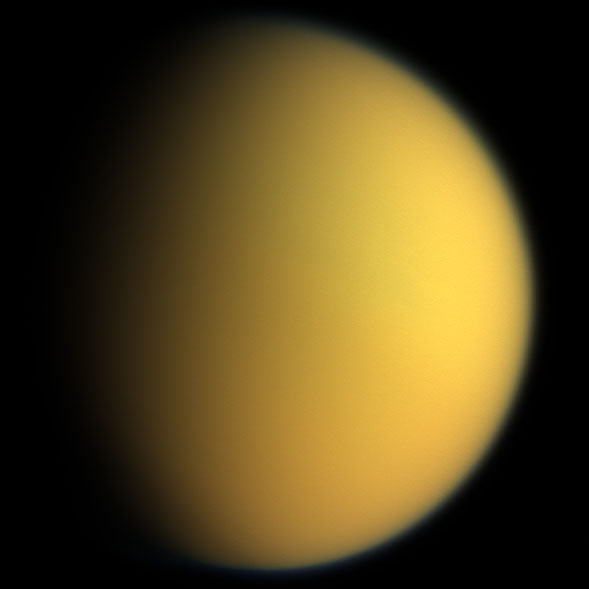
Titan, where the story takes place.

Tim and Diane Vick are two New Yorkers left impoverished by the 2142 collapse of the Planetary Trading Corporation. Rather than sit and wait for their money to run out, they decide to travel to Titan for a year to prospect for gems. Six months into their stay on Titan, they have succeeded in acquiring eighteen flame-orchids, which will make them wealthy on Earth, assuming they survive to reach Earth.

Every fifteen years, Saturn eclipses the sun, and Titan spends seventy-two hours in darkness. (Note: In the story. In reality, at the appropriate times Titan experiences multiple eclipses of the Sun by Saturn with each of its orbits, growing and then decreasing in length. The longest of these eclipses is about six hours.) Nine months into the Vicks' stay, four Titanian days before the eclipse is due, an ice mountain near the Vicks' shack collapses. The Vicks escape the destruction of their shack, but find themselves stranded a hundred miles from the main human settlement on Titan, the United States-ran Nivia, otherwise known as the City of Snow, on the far side of the Mountains of the Damned. Tim Vick decides that they should try to reach Nivia, since the wind recently shifted and will be at their backs for the next eight days.

Three days into their trek, Diane collapses. In desperation, Tim drags her into an ice-ant nest. The air in the nest is above freezing, and the ice-ants ignore them since they find the Vicks' foam-rubber clothing inedible. Tim wakes the next morning to find that the ice-ants have eaten away the leather bag holding their flame-orchids, and all but one of them have been washed away into the depths of the subterranean ice-ant hive. The eclipse slowly begins, and when the sun sets that night, Tim knows he won't see it again for four days. The temperature drops past a hundred below that night, and only rises to seventy below the next day.

The Vicks manage to find two small ice-ant nests to spend the next night in, and remain there through the next day and night. The next day's journey brings them into the Mountains of the Damned. When the temperature drops to 140 below zero, they take shelter in a mountain cave. There they find themselves facing a Titanian threadworm. Tim is almost lulled to sleep by its hypnotic buzzing, but Diane wakes him, and he shoots it. They block the entrance to a threadworm nest and Diane falls asleep. Tim takes out their last flame-orchid and finds it shattered. Angrily he pounds it into dust with a rock.

When morning comes, they prepare to leave, when Diane notices the fragments of the flame-orchid. During the night, each one had grown, until they now have fifty the size of the original. They gather them up, and Tim wraps up some of the rock dust from the cave floor for later analysis. The two resume climbing, but they are still a mile below the summit when the wind dies, and a thousand feet below when the wind starts blowing in their faces. They find themselves being pushed back down the face of the mountain, and pass out. Tim awakens to find the two of them in a hollow a quarter mile below the summit. He resumes climbing, dragging the unconscious Diane with him, until he passes the summit and starts down the far side, with the lights of Nivia visible in the foothills below. Despite a severe bashing from the wind, near unconsciousness and severe frostbite, Tim reaches the settlement in time to save himself and his wife. The Vicks are now rich from the fragments of the smashed, priceless flame-orchid that have all grown to the size of the original.

== Weinbaum's description of Titan ==
In Weinbaum's description of the Solar System, in accordance with the then-accepted near-collision hypothesis of planetary formation, the gas giants radiate enough heat to bring their inner satellites up to Earth-like temperatures. Being over 600,000 miles from Saturn, Titan receives only a third of its heat from its primary. Titan's temperature is comparable to Earth's Antarctic regions, ranging from just above freezing during the day to eighty below zero Fahrenheit during the nine-hour-long nights. Due to Saturn's tidal pull, Titan is also subject to 100 mph winds, which blow from east to west during half of the moon's sixteen-day revolution around its primary, and west to east during the other half, only dying down for half an hour in between each shift in direction. Despite all this, Titan has a flourishing Arctic ecosystem, apparently at the top of which is a clawed, blubbery seal-like native race of infant-like intelligence. "The natives", as they are simply known, have developed a barter system with settlers from Earth, trading rare, precious and expensive Titanian gems for knives, beads, mirrors, and other trinkets. Less sentient Titanian life-forms include the elastic, stinging "Whiplash Trees"; small, three-legged "Ice-Ants" which create oval ice-hives; giant, one-eyed, hypnosis-inducing, cave-dwelling "Threadworm"; and an airborne predator the size of a pterodactyl called a "Knife-Kite." There are also strong hints of a former intelligent civilization on Titan that created their own architecture such as carved pillars; this is also perhaps a surviving intelligent native culture which remains unseen. All life on Titan has a metabolism based on arsenic, and so have to be chemically treated to render them safe before being eaten by humans. It is mentioned in the story that the eating of the semi-intelligent natives is forbidden, although some humans of the settlement of Nivia ignore this rule and eat this prohibited meat in secret.

== Releases ==
"Flight on Titan" was originally published in 1935. "Flight on Titan" is the first science fiction story featuring Titan.

"Flight on Titan" appears in the following Stanley G. Weinbaum collections:

- The Red Peri (1952)
- A Martian Odyssey and Other Science Fiction Tales (1974)
- Interplanetary Odysseys (2006)
