= The Adaptive Ultimate =

- Short story by Stanley G. Weinbaum
- Country: United States
- Language: English
- Genre: Science fiction

Publication
- Published in: Astounding Magazine
- Publication date: November 1935

"The Adaptive Ultimate" is a science fiction short story by American writer Stanley G. Weinbaum, about an experimental medical treatment gone awry. It was first published in the November 1935 issue of Astounding magazine under the pen name "John Jessel". It was collected in various editions of A Martian Odyssey, as well as the 1979 The Best Of Stanley G. Weinbaum.

The story was dramatized on the radio program Escape March 26, 1949 and later that year on the television program Studio One episode called "Kyra Zelas" (the name of the title character) aired on September 12, 1949. It was dramatized on June 20, 1952, on the television show Tales of Tomorrow under the title "The Miraculous Serum" (Season 1, Episode 38), and again on December 3, 1955, on the television show Science Fiction Theatre under the title "Beyond Return", starring Zachary Scott and Joan Vohs, with the story credited to John Jessel. A film version was released in 1957 as She Devil, starring Mari Blanchard, Jack Kelly, and Albert Dekker.

In the 1971 Astounding/Analog All-Time Poll, the story tied for 16th in the Pre-1940 Short Fiction classification.

== Plot summary ==
Dr. Daniel Scott approaches his colleague, Dr. Herman Bach of Grand Mercy Hospital, looking for a human test subject. Scott claims that recovering from a disease or injury is merely a matter of adaptation. He has derived a serum from fruit flies, the most adaptable creatures he could find. Bach is skeptical, but has a patient only hours from death due to tuberculosis (at the time an incurable disease). With nothing to lose, a drab, plain woman named Kyra Zelas agrees to the treatment.

The results are beyond Scott's wildest dreams. Within a week, Zelas is well and is discharged from the hospital. Shortly afterwards, she murders an old man in a park for his money. She is quickly arrested and brought to trial. A witness describes the killer as a skinny brunette, but the Kyra Zelas on trial possesses a stunning figure and pure white hair, and the case is dismissed. Scott and Bach attend the trial; Bach notices that when sunlight strikes her hair, it turns blonde immediately. The two doctors reach the conclusion that Zelas has become adaptive to an extreme degree. This hypothesis is confirmed when she accepts an offer of shelter from Dr. Bach, allowing the two men to make observations.

During her stay, Zelas confesses her crime to Scott. She also tells him that she thinks she wants him. At that moment, her already-great beauty intensifies; Scott realizes that she is adapting once again, to make him love her, but even knowing this, he falls under her spell.

From experiments on guinea pigs, the doctors find that the adaptive ability is connected to hypertrophy of the pineal gland, but when they try to put Zelas to sleep with gas in order to operate on her, she is unaffected - she quickly develops an immunity. After stealing a car and killing a child in a hit-and-run accident, Zelas leaves to acquire power to protect herself.

When next the doctors hear of her, they find that she has become engaged to a rising politician, the Secretary of the Treasury. As time passes, she is more and more in the news, hinting that her influence is growing. One day, she returns for an overnight visit to try once more to woo Scott, but fails. Scott and Bach realize that they will have only one chance to stop her grandiose schemes, but how?

Then Scott finds her weakness: no organism can adapt to its own waste products. They pump carbon dioxide gas into her room to knock her out as she sleeps. Even so, she almost escapes.

The doctors are able to operate on her pineal gland. Afterwards, she reverts to her former appearance, with just a hint left of the magnificent beauty she once possessed, but to Dr. Scott's eyes, she has not changed in the least.

== Listen to ==
- The Adaptive Ultimate on Escape, CBS radio, 1949 (cited episode author is "John Jessel")
