= Parasite Planet =

- Short story by Stanley G. Weinbaum
- Country: United States
- Language: English
- Genre: Science fiction

Publication
- Published in: Astounding Stories
- Publication type: Periodical
- Publisher: Street & Smith
- Media type: Print (Magazine, Hardback & Paperback)
- Publication date: February 1935

Chronology
- Series: Ham Hammond
—	The Lotus Eaters

"Parasite Planet" is a science fiction short story by American writer Stanley G. Weinbaum originally published in the February 1935 issue of Astounding Stories. It was Weinbaum's fourth published story, and the first to be set on Venus. He quickly followed it up with a sequel called "The Lotus Eaters".

In Before the Golden Age, Isaac Asimov states the story was an influence on his own Venus-set novel, Lucky Starr and the Oceans of Venus.

== Weinbaum's Venus ==
In the story, tidal locking keeps one side of Venus perpetually facing the Sun. This side of the planet is a barren desert. Towards the planet's twilight region the temperature drops below the boiling point of water and the Hotlands begin: an area of the planet inhabited by native life forms, all of them parasitic to a greater or lesser degree. "A thousand different species, but all the same in one respect; each of them was all appetite. In common with most Venusian beings, they had a multiplicity of both legs and mouths; in fact, some of them were little more than blobs of skin split into dozens of hungry mouths, crawling on a hundred spidery legs." The air of the Hotlands is hazy with spores which instantly infest any life-form unfortunate enough to have its skin pierced, and at the top of the Venusian food chain is the doughpot, a mass of fast-moving undifferentiated protoplasm that absorbs every living thing in its path, and whose touch is fatal to humans.

Close to the terminator a constant wind from the night side of Venus brings the temperature below 80 degrees Fahrenheit, too cold for the spores and most of the other Hotlands' life. This is the Cool Country, where most of the planet's human settlers live. At the terminator itself, the lower wind from the night side meets a hot upper wind from the day side, resulting in a permanent violent thunderstorm. The precipitation from that storm falls as snow on the night side of the terminator, forming a vast ice barrier which slumps under its own weight into the dayside, then melts into rivers that flow away from the terminator until they evaporate in the growing heat.

It is revealed in a later story, "The Planet of Doubt", that the United States had attempted to lay claim to all of Venus. The Council of Bern ruled in 2059 that planetary explorers could only lay claim to as much of a planet as they had explored. As a result, the United States was only able to establish a claim to a quarter of the habitable zone of Venus, with the other three quarters being occupied by the United Kingdom, France, and the Netherlands.

== Plot summary ==
Hamilton "Ham" Hammond is an American trader who lives in the Venusian Hotlands in the late 21st century. He makes his living collecting xixtchil spore-pods from the native Venusians, which are used to make a rejuvenation drug on Earth. When Hammond's shack is sucked under the surface by a mud-spout, he must make his way across 200 miles of hot, humid, hostile Venusian jungle to reach Erotia, a settlement in the American part of the planet.

Hammond comes upon a human dwelling which, contrary to custom, is locked. He forces his way inside and is confronted by Patricia Burlingame, daughter of the late British explorer Patrick Burlingame. As Hammond is in the British part of Venus, Burlingame denounces him as a poacher. A confrontation between the two is interrupted by the arrival of a doughpot which wrecks Burlingame's dwelling. The two grudgingly set aside their differences and travel west to the Cool Country, saving each other's lives on several occasions. Their truce ends when Hammond wakes to find that Burlingame has emptied his xixtchil pods onto the ground, exposing them to the destructive spores. Now destitute, Hammond angrily sets off north toward Erotia, leaving Burlingame to make her way south through the impassable Mountains of Eternity to the British settlement of Venoble alone.

After a time, Hammond suffers an attack of conscience, turns, and follows Burlingame south. He catches up with her in the foothills of the Eternities just before a huge doughpot traps them in a box canyon. Hammond is able to get off two shots of his flame pistol at the doughpot before the barrel shatters, reducing the thing's size but still leaving them trapped. They decide to go deeper into the box canyon, but in the darkness they are set upon by Triops noctivivans, vicious nightside-dwelling cousins of the Venusians. The trioptes drive them back toward the doughpot, dosing Burlingame with a soporific drug that renders her unconscious. Hammond is forced to make his way past the doughpot on a low, narrow shelf of rock while carrying Burlingame.

The two make it past the doughpot; when the pursuing trioptes arrive, they stop chasing the humans and start eating the doughpot instead. When Burlingame revives, she admits that instead of destroying the xixtchil pods, she had actually stolen them. She returns them to Hammond, and agrees to come with him to Erotia. She also agrees to marry him.

== Collections ==
"Parasite Planet" appears in the following Stanley G. Weinbaum collections:

- A Martian Odyssey and Others (1949)
- A Martian Odyssey and Other Science Fiction Tales (1974)
- The Best of Stanley G. Weinbaum (1974)
- Interplanetary Odysseys (2006)
