= Stanley G. Weinbaum =

American writer (1902–1935)

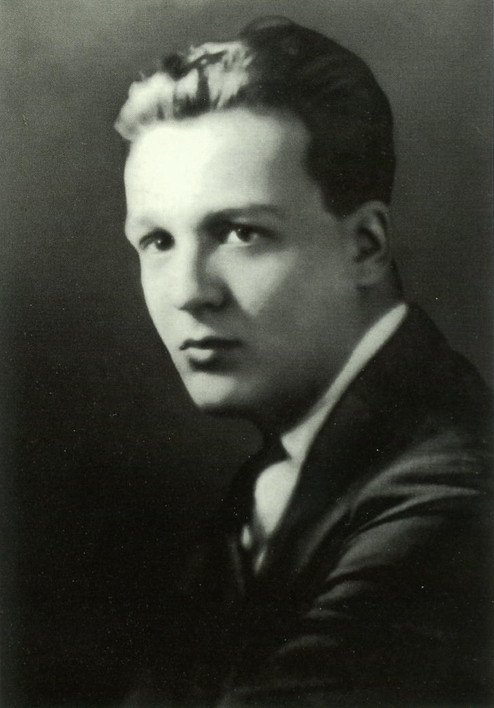
- Born: Stanley Grauman Weinbaum; April 4, 1902; Louisville, Kentucky
- Died: December 14, 1935 (aged 33); Milwaukee, Wisconsin
- Occupation: Writer
- Writing career
- Pen name: Marge Stanley
- Period: 1933–1935
- Genres: Science fiction, romantic fiction
- Notable work: "A Martian Odyssey"

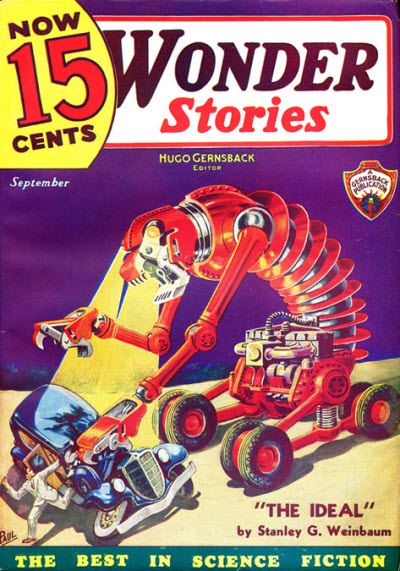
"The Ideal", published in the September 1935 Wonder Stories, was Weinbaum's first cover story in a science fiction magazine. The "Van Manderpootz" story was illustrated by Frank R. Paul

Stanley Grauman Weinbaum (April 4, 1902 – December 14, 1935) was an American science fiction writer. His first story, "A Martian Odyssey", was published to great acclaim in July 1934; the alien Tweel was arguably the first character to satisfy John W. Campbell's challenge: "Write me a creature who thinks as well as a man, or better than a man, but not like a man." Weinbaum wrote more short stories and a few novels, but died from lung cancer less than a year and a half later.

== Life and career ==
Weinbaum was born in Louisville, Kentucky, the son of Stella (née Grauman) and Nathan A. Weinbaum. His family was Jewish.

He attended Riverside High School in Milwaukee. He was granted admission to the University of Wisconsin–Madison in Madison in July 1920. He first majored in chemical engineering, then switched to English, but contrary to common belief he did not graduate. On a bet, Weinbaum took an exam for a friend, and was later discovered; he left the university in 1923.

Weinbaum is best known for his groundbreaking science fiction short story "A Martian Odyssey", which presents a sympathetic but decidedly non-human alien, Tweel. This was his first science fiction story: in 1933 he had sold a romantic novel, The Lady Dances, to King Features Syndicate, which serialized the story in its newspapers in early 1934. Isaac Asimov described "A Martian Odyssey" as "a perfect Campbellian science fiction story, before John W. Campbell. Indeed, Tweel may be the first creature in science fiction to fulfil Campbell's dictum, 'write me a creature who thinks as well as a man, or better than a man, but not like a man'." Asimov went on to describe it as one of only three stories that changed the way all subsequent stories in the science fiction genre have been written. It was the oldest short story and one of the top vote-getters selected by the Science Fiction Writers of America for inclusion in The Science Fiction Hall of Fame, Volume One, 1929–1964.

Most of the work that was published in Weinbaum's lifetime appeared in either Astounding or Wonder Stories. However, several of his pieces first appeared in the early science fiction fanzine Fantasy Magazine (successor to Science Fiction Digest) in the 1930s, including an "Auto-Biographical Sketch" in the June 1935 issue. Despite common belief, Weinbaum was not one of the contributors to the multi-authored Cosmos serial in Science Fiction Digest/Fantasy Magazine. He did contribute to the multi-author story "The Challenge From Beyond", published in the September 1935 Fantasy Magazine.

At the time of his death, Weinbaum was writing a novel, Three Who Danced. In this novel, the Prince of Wales is unexpectedly present at a dance in an obscure American community, where he dances with three of the local girls, choosing each for a different reason. Each girl's life is changed, happily or tragically, as a result of the unexpected attention she has received.

In 1993, Weinbaum's widow, Margaret Hawtof Kay, donated his papers to the Temple University Library in Philadelphia, Pennsylvania. Included were several unpublished manuscripts, among them Three Who Danced, as well as other unpublished stories. These are mostly romance stories, but there are also a few other non-fiction and fiction writings, none of them science fiction.

A film version of Weinbaum's short story "The Adaptive Ultimate" was released in 1957 under the title She Devil, starring Mari Blanchard, Jack Kelly, and Albert Dekker. The story was also dramatized for television as an episode of Studio One titled "Kyra Zelas" (the name of the title character), broadcast on September 12, 1949. A radio dramatization of "The Adaptive Ultimate" was performed on the anthology show Escape in the 1950s.

== Honors and awards ==
A crater on Mars is named in Weinbaum's honor. On July 18, 2008, he won the Cordwainer Smith Rediscovery Award.

== Critical reception ==
Lester del Rey declared that "Weinbaum, more than any other writer, helped to take our field out of the doldrums of the early thirties and into the beginnings of modern science fiction." H. P. Lovecraft stated that Weinbaum's writing was ingenious, and that he stood miles above the other pulp fiction writers in his creation of genuinely alien worlds, in contrast to Edgar Rice Burroughs and his "inane" stories of "egg-laying Princesses". Frederik Pohl wrote that before Weinbaum, science fiction's aliens "might be catmen, lizard-men, antmen, plantmen or rockmen; but they were, always and incurably, men. Weinbaum changed that. ... it was the difference in orientation – in drives, goals and thought processes – that made the Weinbaum-type alien so fresh and rewarding in science fiction in the mid-thirties." According to Pohl, that Weinbaum's "revolutionary idea" was to "give some sort of three-dimensional reality to the characters", in contrast to Hugo Gernsback's "animated catalogue of gadgets". Isaac Asimov wrote, "Weinbaum... had he lived, would surely be in first place in the list of all-time-favorite science fiction writers."

Everett F. Bleiler, however, wrote that, although Weinbaum "was generally considered the most promising new s-f author of his day," his reputation is overstated. While "Weinbaum's style was more lively than that of his genre contemporaries, and he was imaginative in background details, ... his work was ordinary pulp fiction, with routine plots, slapdash presentation, cardboard characterization, and much cliche of ideas." Alexei and Cory Panshin concluded that "Time has swallowed what were once Weinbaum's particular virtues. What is left seems quaint and quirky."

== Planetary series ==
All of Weinbaum's nine interplanetary stories are set in a consistent solar system that was scientifically accurate by the standards of his time. The deceptively avian-looking, botanical Martians of "A Martian Odyssey" and "Valley of Dreams", for instance, are mentioned in "Redemption Cairn" and "The Red Peri"; the quadrupedal Venusian trioptes of "Parasite Planet" and "The Lotus Eaters" are mentioned in "The Mad Moon"; the vicious, pseudomammalian pests of The Mad Moon appear in Valley of Dreams as minor antagonists; and the rock-eating Pyramid-Makers of Mars are mentioned in "Tidal Moon". In Weinbaum's solar system, in accordance with the then-current near-collision hypothesis, the gas giants radiate heat, enough to warm their satellites to Earthlike temperatures, allowing for Earthlike environments on Io, Europa, Titan, and even Uranus. Mars is also sufficiently Earthlike to allow humans to walk on its surface unprotected following training in thin-air chambers.

== Van Manderpootz stories ==
Three of Weinbaum's short stories deal with Dixon Wells, a perpetually late playboy who runs afoul of the inventions of his friend and former instructor in "Newer Physics", Professor Haskel van Manderpootz, a supremely immodest genius who rates Albert Einstein as his equal or slight inferior. In "The Worlds of If", Wells tests an invention that reveals what might have been; in "The Ideal", the professor creates a device that can show the image of a person's ideal (in Wells' case, his perfect woman); the contrivance of "The Point of View" allows one to see the world from another's perspective. In all three, Wells finds and then loses the woman of his dreams.

== Bibliography ==
=== Novels ===
- The Lady Dances (King-Features Syndicate 1933). This novel, published under the pen name "Marge Stanley", was published as a newspaper serial in early 1934 and is now available as a print-on-demand title.
- The New Adam (Ziff-Davis 1939)
- The Black Flame (1939; Fantasy Press 1948)
- The Black Flame (Tachyon Publications 1997; ISBN 0-9648320-0-3)
- The Dark Other aka The Mad Brain (Fantasy Publishing Company 1950)

=== Short stories ===
- "A Martian Odyssey" in 7/34 Wonder
- "Valley of Dreams" in 11/34 Wonder
- "Flight on Titan" in 1/35 Astounding
- "Parasite Planet" in 2/35 Astounding
- "The Lotus Eaters" in 4/35 Astounding
- "Pygmalion's Spectacles" in 6/35 Wonder
- "The Worlds of If" in 8/35 Wonder
- "The Challenge From Beyond" in 9/35 Fantasy Magazine (Weinbaum wrote the opening 800+ words of the science-fiction version of this round-robin story. The other four writers were Donald Wandrei, E. E. Smith, Harl Vincent and Murray Leinster)
- "The Ideal" in 9/35 Wonder
- "The Planet of Doubt" in 10/35 Astounding
- "The Adaptive Ultimate" in 11/35 Astounding (as by John Jessel)
- "The Red Peri" in 11/35 Astounding
- "The Mad Moon" in 12/35 Astounding

==== Posthumous publications ====
- "The Point of View" in 1/36 Wonder
- "Smothered Seas" in 1/36 Astounding (with Roger Sherman Hoar writing as Ralph Milne Farley)
- "Yellow Slaves" in 2/36 True Gang Life (with Roger Sherman Hoar writing as Ralph Milne Farley)
- "Redemption Cairn" in 3/36 Astounding
- "The Circle of Zero" in 8/36 Thrilling Wonder
- "Proteus Island" in 8/36 Astounding
- "Graph" in 9/36 Fantasy Magazine
- "The Brink of Infinity" in 12/36 Thrilling Wonder
- "Shifting Seas" in 4/37 Amazing (anticipates discussions of climate change due to changes in the Gulf Stream)
- "Revolution of 1950" 10-11/38 Amazing (with Roger Sherman Hoar writing as Ralph Milne Farley)
- "Tidal Moon" in 12/38 Thrilling Wonder (with Helen Weinbaum, his sister)
- "The Black Flame" in 1/39 Startling
- "Dawn of Flame" in 6/39 Thrilling Wonder
- "Green Glow of Death" in 7/57 Crack Detective and Mystery Stories
- The King's Watch, Posthumous Press, 1994, hardcover book, with Foreword and signed by Robert Bloch and tipped in photo of writers' group, The Milwaukee Fictioneers, to which Weinbaum and Bloch both belonged. (This story is a variant of "The Green Glow of Death" from 7/57 Crack Detective and Mystery Stories.)

=== Collections of stories and poetry ===
- The Best of Stanley G. Weinbaum, Ballantine, 1974
- Lunaria and Other Poems, The Strange Publishing Company 1988
- The Black Heart, Leonaur Publishing, 2006
- Dawn of Flame: The Stanley G. Weinbaum Memorial Volume, Conrad H. Ruppert, 1936
- Interplanetary Odysseys, Leonaur Publishing, 2006
- A Martian Odyssey and Other Science Fiction Tales, Hyperion Press, 1974
- A Martian Odyssey and Others, Fantasy Press, 1949
- A Martian Odyssey and Other Classics of Science Fiction, Lancer, 1962
- Other Earths, Leonaur Publishing, 2006
- The Red Peri, Fantasy Press, 1952
- Strange Genius, Leonaur Publishing, 2006
