= Mars in fiction =

Depictions of the planet

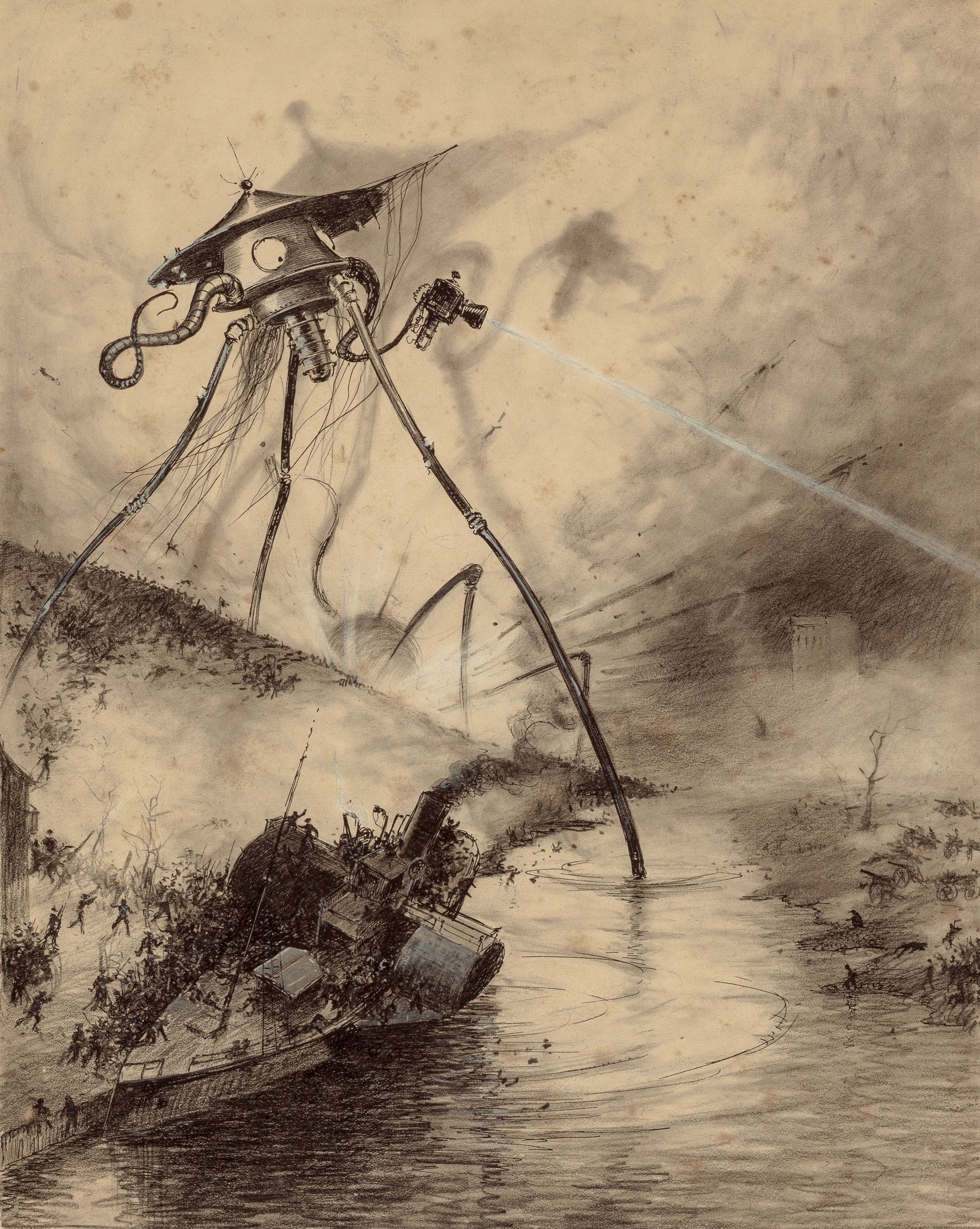
H. G. Wells's The War of the Worlds, depicting Martians invading Earth, is one of the most influential works of science fiction.

Mars, the fourth planet from the Sun, has appeared as a setting in works of fiction since at least the mid-1600s. Trends in the planet's portrayal have largely been influenced by advances in planetary science. It became the most popular celestial object in fiction in the late 1800s, when it became clear that there was no life on the Moon. The predominant genre depicting Mars at the time was utopian fiction. Around the same time, the mistaken belief that there are canals on Mars emerged and made its way into fiction, popularized by Percival Lowell's speculations of an ancient civilization having constructed them. The War of the Worlds, H. G. Wells's novel about an alien invasion of Earth by sinister Martians, was published in 1897 and went on to have a major influence on the science fiction genre.

Life on Mars appeared frequently in fiction throughout the first half of the 1900s. Intelligent and human-like Martians, apart from being depicted as enlightened as in the utopian works from the turn of the century, or evil as in the works inspired by Wells, further began to be portrayed as decadent, a characterization that was popularized by Edgar Rice Burroughs in the Barsoom series and adopted by Leigh Brackett among others. More exotic lifeforms appeared in stories like Stanley G. Weinbaum's "A Martian Odyssey".

The theme of colonizing Mars replaced stories about native inhabitants of the planet in the second half of the 1900s following emerging evidence of the planet being inhospitable to life, eventually confirmed by data from Mars exploration probes. A significant minority of works persisted in portraying Mars in a nostalgic way that was by then scientifically outdated, including Ray Bradbury's The Martian Chronicles.

Terraforming Mars to enable human habitation has been another major theme, especially in the final quarter of the century, the most prominent example being Kim Stanley Robinson's Mars trilogy. Stories of the first human mission to Mars appeared throughout the 1990s in response to the Space Exploration Initiative, and near-future exploration and settlement became increasingly common themes following the launches of other Mars exploration probes in the latter half of the decade. In the year 2000, science fiction scholar Gary Westfahl estimated the total number of works of fiction dealing with Mars up to that point to exceed five thousand, and the planet has continued to make frequent appearances across several genres and forms of media since. In contrast, the moons of Mars—Phobos and Deimos—have made only sporadic appearances in fiction.

== Early depictions ==
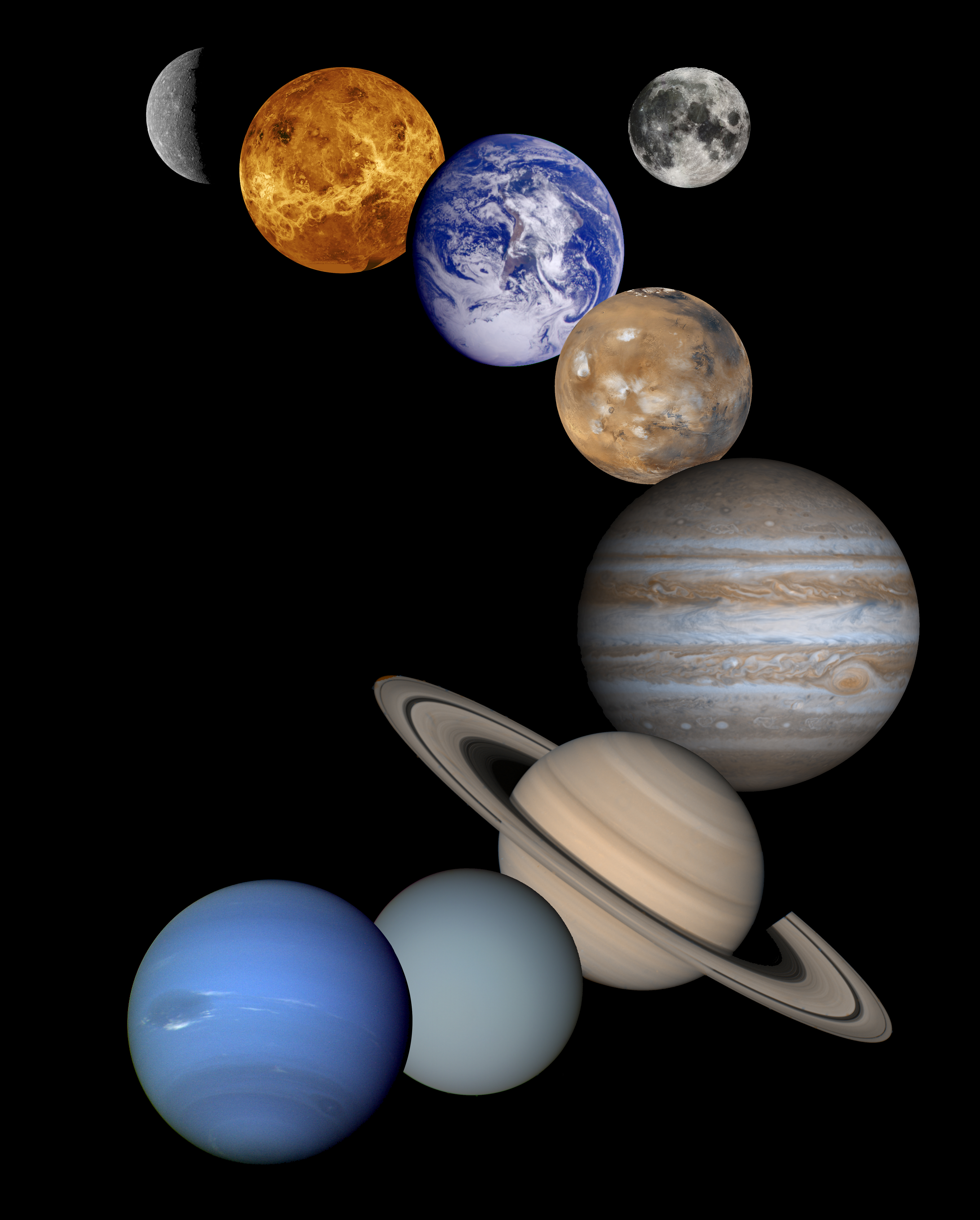
Early depictions of Mars in fiction were often part of tours of the Solar System. Clicking on a planet leads to the article about its depiction in fiction.

Before the 1800s, Mars did not get much attention in fiction writing as a primary setting, though it did appear in some stories visiting multiple locations in the Solar System. The first fictional tour of the planets, the 1656 work Itinerarium exstaticum by Athanasius Kircher, portrays Mars as a volcanic wasteland. It also appears briefly in the 1686 work Entretiens sur la pluralité des mondes (Conversations on the Plurality of Worlds) by Bernard Le Bovier de Fontenelle but is largely dismissed as uninteresting due to its presumed similarity to Earth. Mars is home to spirits in several works of the mid-1700s. In the anonymously published 1755 work A Voyage to the World in the Centre of the Earth, it is a heavenly place where, among others, Alexander the Great enjoys a second life. In the 1758 work De Telluribus in Mundo Nostro Solari (Concerning the Earths in Our Solar System) by Emanuel Swedenborg, the planet is inhabited by beings characterized by honesty and moral virtue. In the 1765 novel Voyage de Milord Céton dans les sept planètes (The Voyages of Lord Seaton to the Seven Planets) by Marie-Anne de Roumier-Robert, reincarnated soldiers roam a war-torn landscape. It later appeared alongside the other planets throughout the 1800s. In the anonymously published 1839 novel A Fantastical Excursion into the Planets, it is divided between the Roman gods Mars and Vulcan. In the anonymously published 1873 novel A Narrative of the Travels and Adventures of Paul Aermont among the Planets, it is culturally rather similar to Earth—unlike the other planets. In the 1883 novel Aleriel, or A Voyage to Other Worlds by W. S. Lach-Szyrma, a visitor from Venus relates the details of Martian society to Earthlings. The first work of science fiction set primarily on Mars was the 1880 novel Across the Zodiac by Percy Greg.

Mars became the most popular extraterrestrial location in fiction in the late 1800s as it became clear that the Moon was devoid of life. A recurring theme in this time period was that of reincarnation on Mars, reflecting an upswing in interest in the paranormal in general and in relation to Mars in particular. Humans are reborn on Mars in the 1889 novel Uranie by Camille Flammarion as a form of afterlife, the 1896 novel Daybreak: The Story of an Old World by James Cowan depicts Jesus reincarnated there, and the protagonist of the 1903 novel The Certainty of a Future Life in Mars by Louis Pope Gratacap receives a message in Morse code from his deceased father on Mars. Other supernatural phenomena include telepathy in Greg's Across the Zodiac and precognition in the 1886 short story "The Blindman's World" by Edward Bellamy.

Several recurring tropes were introduced during this time. One of them is Mars having a different local name such as Glintan in the 1889 novel Mr. Stranger's Sealed Packet by Hugh MacColl, Oron in the 1892 novel Messages from Mars, By Aid of the Telescope Plant by Robert D. Braine, and Barsoom in the 1912 novel A Princess of Mars by Edgar Rice Burroughs. This carried on in later works such as the 1938 novel Out of the Silent Planet by C. S. Lewis, which calls the planet Malacandra. Several stories also depict Martians speaking Earth languages and provide explanations of varying levels of preposterousness. In the 1899 novel Pharaoh's Broker by Ellsworth Douglass, Martians speak Hebrew as Mars goes through the same historical phases as Earth with a delay of a few thousand years, here corresponding to the captivity of the Israelites in Biblical Egypt. In the 1901 novel A Honeymoon in Space by George Griffith, they speak English because they acknowledge it as the "most convenient" language of all. In the 1920 novel A Trip to Mars by Marcianus Rossi, the Martians speak Latin as a result of having been taught the language by a Roman who was flung into space by the eruption of Mount Vesuvius in the year 79. Martians were often portrayed as existing within a racial hierarchy: the 1894 novel Journey to Mars by Gustavus W. Pope features Martians with different skin colours (red, blue, and yellow) subject to strict anti-miscegenation laws, Rossi's A Trip to Mars sees one portion of the Martian population described as "our inferior race, the same as your terrestrian negroes", and Burroughs's Barsoom series has red, green, yellow, and black Martians, a white race—responsible for the previous advanced civilization on Mars—having become extinct.

=== Means of travel ===
The question of how humans would get to Mars was addressed in several ways: when not travelling there via spaceship as in the 1911 novel To Mars via the Moon: An Astronomical Story by Mark Wicks, they might use a flying carpet as in the 1905 novel Lieut. Gullivar Jones: His Vacation by Edwin Lester Arnold, a balloon as in A Narrative of the Travels and Adventures of Paul Aermont among the Planets, or an "aeroplane" as in the 1893 novel Unveiling a Parallel: A Romance by Alice Ilgenfritz Jones and Ella Robinson Merchant (writing jointly as "Two Women of the West"). They might also visit in a dream as in the 1899 play A Message from Mars by Richard Ganthony, teleport via astral projection as in Burroughs's A Princess of Mars, or use a long-range communication device while staying on Earth as in Braine's Messages from Mars, By Aid of the Telescope Plant and the 1894 novel W nieznane światy (To the Unknown Worlds) by Polish science fiction writer Władysław Umiński. Anti-gravity is employed in several works including Greg's Across the Zodiac, MacColl's Mr. Stranger's Sealed Packet, and the 1890 novel A Plunge into Space by Robert Cromie. Occasionally, the method of transport is not addressed at all. Some stories take the opposite approach of having Martians come to Earth; examples include the 1891 novel The Man from Mars: His Morals, Politics and Religion by Thomas Blot (pseudonym of William Simpson) and the 1893 novel A Cityless and Countryless World by Henry Olerich.

=== Canals ===
A clement twilight zone on a synchronously rotating Mercury, a swamp-and-jungle Venus, and a canal-infested Mars, while all classic science-fiction devices, are all, in fact, based upon earlier misapprehensions by planetary scientists.

— Carl Sagan, 1978

During the opposition of Mars in 1877, Italian astronomer Giovanni Schiaparelli announced the discovery of linear structures he dubbed canali (literally channels, but widely translated as canals) on the Martian surface. These were generally interpreted—by those who accepted their disputed existence—as waterways, and they made their earliest appearance in fiction in the anonymously published 1883 novel Politics and Life in Mars, where the Martians live in the water. Schiaparelli's observations, and perhaps the translation of canali as "canals" rather than "channels", inspired Percival Lowell to speculate that these were artificial constructs and write a series of non-fiction books—Mars in 1895, Mars and Its Canals in 1906, and Mars as the Abode of Life in 1908—popularizing the idea. Lowell posited that Mars was home to an ancient and advanced but dying or already dead Martian civilization who had constructed these vast canals for irrigation to survive on an increasingly arid planet, and this became an enduring vision of Mars that influenced writers across several decades. Science fiction scholar Gary Westfahl, drawing from the catalogue of early science fiction works compiled by E. F. Bleiler and Richard Bleiler in the reference works Science-Fiction: The Early Years from 1990 and Science-Fiction: The Gernsback Years from 1998, concludes that Lowell thus "effectively set the boundaries for subsequent narratives about an inhabited Mars".

Canals became a feature of romantic portrayals of Mars such as Burroughs's Barsoom series. Early works that did not depict any waterways on Mars typically explained the appearance of straight lines on the surface in some other way, such as simooms or large tracts of vegetation. Although they quickly fell out of favour as a serious scientific theory, largely as a result of higher-quality telescopic observations by astronomers such as E. M. Antoniadi failing to detect them, canals continued to make sporadic appearances in fiction for a while in works such as the 1936 novel Planet Plane by John Wyndham, the 1938 novel Out of the Silent Planet by C. S. Lewis, and the 1949 novel Red Planet by Robert A. Heinlein. Said Lewis in response to criticism from biologist J. B. S. Haldane, "The canals in Mars are there not because I believe in them but because they are part of the popular tradition." Eventually, the flyby of Mars by Mariner 4 in 1965 conclusively determined that the canals were mere optical illusions.

=== Utopias ===
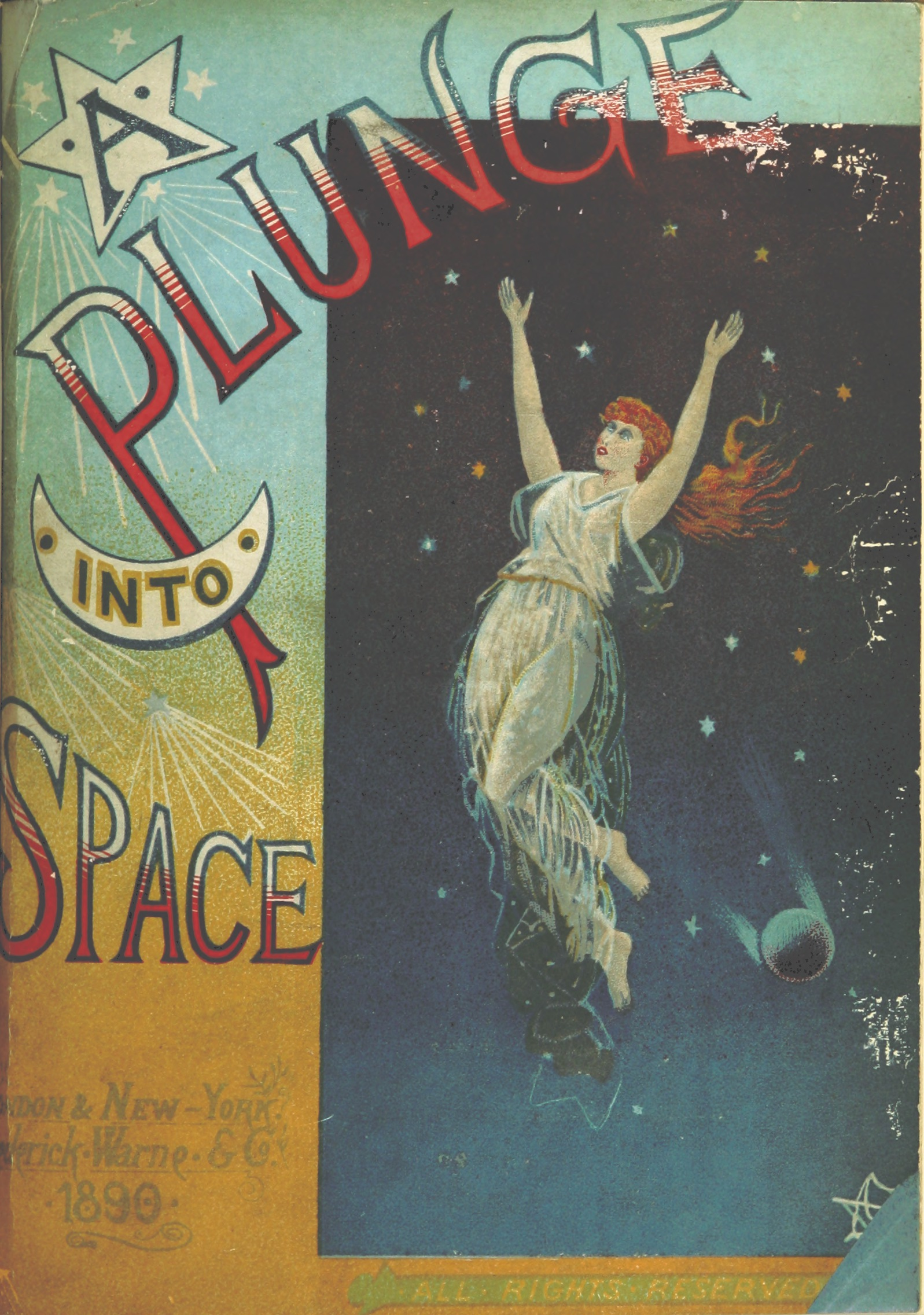
A Plunge into Space, an 1890 piece of utopian fiction set on Mars

Because early versions of the nebular hypothesis of Solar System formation held that the planets were formed sequentially starting at the outermost planets, some authors envisioned Mars as an older and more mature world than the Earth, and it became the setting for many utopian works of fiction. This genre made up the majority of stories about Mars in the late 1800s and continued to be represented through the early 1900s. The earliest of these works was the 1880 novel Across the Zodiac by Percy Greg. The 1887 novel Bellona's Husband: A Romance by William James Roe portrays a Martian society where everyone ages backwards. The 1890 novel A Plunge into Space by Robert Cromie depicts a society that is so advanced that life there has become dull and, as a result, the humans who visit succumb to boredom and leave ahead of schedule—to the approval of the Martians, who have come to view them as a corrupting influence. The 1892 novel Messages from Mars, By Aid of the Telescope Plant by Robert D. Braine is unusual in portraying a completely rural Martian utopia without any cities. An early work of feminist science fiction, Jones's and Merchant's 1893 novel Unveiling a Parallel: A Romance, depicts a man from Earth visiting two egalitarian societies on Mars: one where women have adopted male vices and one where equality has brought out everyone's best qualities. The 1897 novel Auf zwei Planeten (Two Planets) by German science fiction pioneer Kurd Lasswitz contrasts a utopian society on Mars with that society's colonialist actions on Earth. The book was translated into several languages and was highly influential in Continental Europe, including inspiring rocket scientist Wernher von Braun, but did not receive a translation into English until the 1970s, which limited its impact in the Anglosphere. The 1910 novel The Man from Mars, Or Service for Service's Sake by Henry Wallace Dowding portrays a civilization on Mars based on a variation on Christianity where woman was created first, in contrast to the conventional Genesis creation narrative. Hugo Gernsback depicted a science-based utopia on Mars in the 1915–1917 serial Baron Münchhausen's New Scientific Adventures, but by and large, World War I spelled the end for utopian Martian fiction.

In Russian science fiction, Mars became the setting for socialist utopias and revolutions. The 1908 novel Red Star (Красная звезда) by Alexander Bogdanov is the primary example of this, and inspired many others. Red Star portrays a socialist society on Mars from the perspective of a Russian Bolshevik invited there, where the struggle between classes has been replaced with a common struggle against the harshness of nature. The 1913 prequel Engineer Menni (Инженер Мэнни), also by Bogdanov, is set several centuries earlier and serves as an origin story for the Martian society by detailing the events of the revolution that brought it about. Another prominent example is the 1922 novel Aelita (Аэлита) by Aleksey Nikolayevich Tolstoy—along with its 1924 film adaptation, the earliest Soviet science fiction film—which adapts the story of the 1905 Russian Revolution to the Martian surface. Red Star and Aelita are in some ways opposites. Red Star, written between the failed revolution in 1905 and the successful 1917 Russian Revolution, sees Mars as a socialist utopia from which Earth can learn, whereas in Aelita the socialist revolution is instead exported from the early Soviet Russia to Mars. Red Star depicts a utopia on Mars, in contrast to the dystopia initially found on Mars in Aelita—though both are technocracies. Red Star is a sincere and idealistic work of traditional utopian fiction, whereas Aelita is a parody.

=== The War of the Worlds ===
The 1897 novel The War of the Worlds by H. G. Wells, which depicts an alien invasion of Earth by Martians in search of resources, represented a turning point in Mars fiction. Rather than being portrayed as essentially human, Wells's Martians have a completely inhuman appearance and cannot be communicated with. Rather than being noble creatures to emulate, the Martians dispassionately kill and exploit the Earthlings like livestock—a critique of contemporary British colonialism in general and its devastating effects on the Aboriginal Tasmanians in particular. The novel set the tone for the majority of the science-fictional depictions of Mars in the decades that followed in portraying the Martians as malevolent and Mars as a dying world. Beyond Martian fiction, the novel had a large influence on the broader science fiction genre, and inspired rocket scientist Robert H. Goddard. According to science fiction essayist Bud Webster, "It's impossible to overstate the importance of The War of the Worlds and the influence it's had over the years."

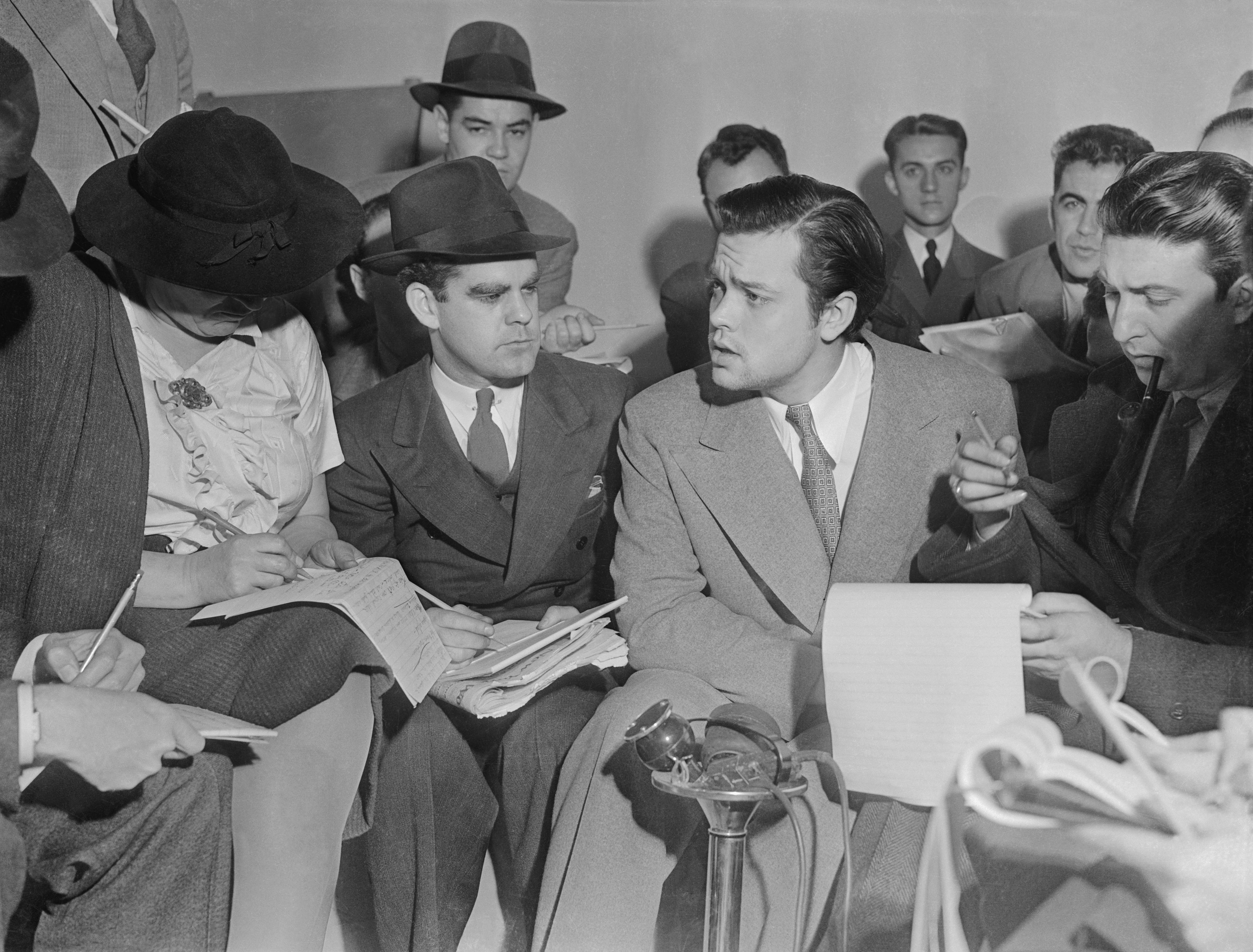
Orson Welles interviewed by reporters after his 1938 radio adaptation of The War of the Worlds caused a panic

An unauthorized sequel—Edison's Conquest of Mars by Garrett P. Serviss—was released in 1898, as was a parody by Charles L. Graves and E. V. Lucas titled The War of the Wenuses. Wells's story gained further notoriety in 1938 when a radio adaptation by Orson Welles in the style of a news broadcast was mistaken for a real newscast by some listeners in the US, leading to panic; less famously, a 1949 broadcast in Quito, Ecuador, also resulted in a riot. Several sequels and adaptations by other authors have been written since, including the 1950 Superman comic book story "Black Magic on Mars" by Alvin Schwartz and Wayne Boring where Orson Welles tries to warn Earth of an impending Martian invasion but is dismissed, the 1968 novel The Second Invasion from Mars (Второе нашествие марсиан) by Soviet science fiction writers Arkady and Boris Strugatsky where the Martians forgo military conquest in favour of infiltration, the 1975 novel Sherlock Holmes's War of the Worlds by Manly Wade Wellman and Wade Wellman and the 1976 novel The Second War of the Worlds by George H. Smith which both combine Wells's story with Arthur Conan Doyle's Sherlock Holmes characters, the 1976 novel The Space Machine by Christopher Priest which combines the story of The War of the Worlds with that of Wells's 1895 novel The Time Machine, the 2002 short story "Ulla, Ulla" by Eric Brown which reframes the invasion as a desperate escape by a peaceful race from a dying world, and the 2005 novel The Martian War by Kevin J. Anderson where Wells himself goes to Mars and instigates a slave uprising. The authorized 2017 sequel novel The Massacre of Mankind by Stephen Baxter is set in 1920 in an alternate timeline where the events of the original novel caused World War I never to happen by making Britain war-weary and isolationist, and the Martians attack yet again after inoculating themselves against the microbes that were their downfall the first time.

== Life on Mars ==
The term Martians typically refers to inhabitants of Mars that are similar to humans in terms of having such things as language and civilization, though it is also occasionally used to refer to extraterrestrials in general. These inhabitants of Mars have variously been depicted as enlightened, evil, and decadent; in keeping with the conception of Mars as an older civilization than Earth, Westfahl refers to these as "good parents", "bad parents", and "dependent parents", respectively.

Martians have also been equated with humans in different ways. Humans are revealed to be the descendants of Martians in several stories including the 1954 short story "Survey Team" by Philip K. Dick. Conversely, Martians are the descendants of humans from Earth in some works such as the 1889 novel Mr. Stranger's Sealed Packet by Hugh MacColl, where a close approach between Mars and Earth in the past allowed some humans to get to Mars, and Tolstoy's Aelita where they are descended from inhabitants of the lost civilization of Atlantis. Human settlers take on the new identity of Martians in the 1946 short story "The Million Year Picnic" by Ray Bradbury (later included in the 1950 fix-up novel The Martian Chronicles), and this theme of "becoming Martians" came to be a recurring motif in Martian fiction toward the end of the century.

=== Enlightened ===
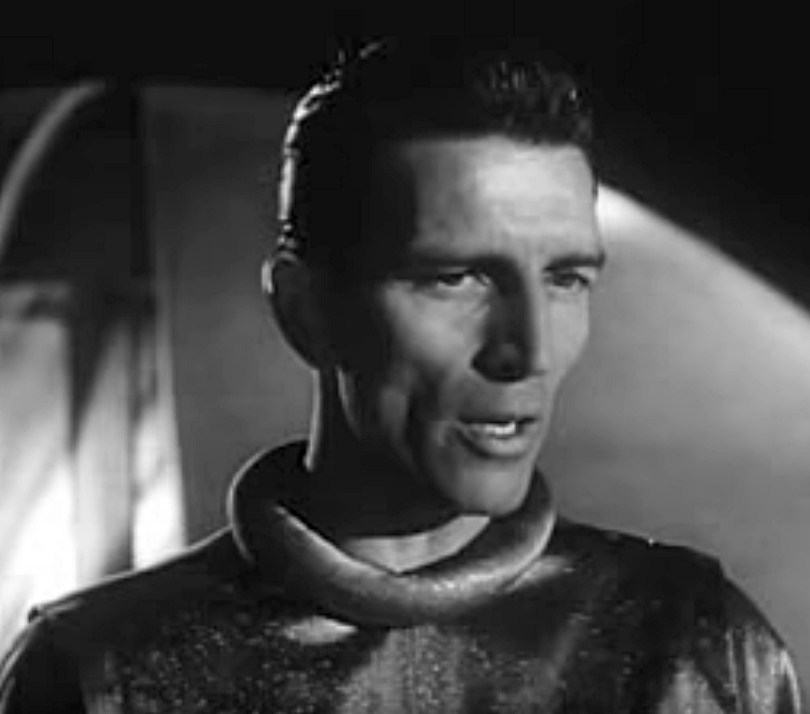
Klaatu, the Martian who visits Earth in the 1951 film The Day the Earth Stood Still

The portrayal of Martians as superior to Earthlings appeared throughout the utopian fiction of the late 1800s. In-depth treatment of the nuances of the concept was pioneered by Kurd Lasswitz with the 1897 novel Auf zwei Planeten, wherein the Martians visit Earth to share their more advanced knowledge with humans and gradually end up acting as an occupying colonial power. Martians sharing wisdom or knowledge with humans is a recurring element in these stories, and some works such as the 1952 novel David Starr, Space Ranger by Isaac Asimov depict Martians sharing their advanced technology with the inhabitants of Earth. Several depictions of enlightened Martians have a religious dimension: in the 1938 novel Out of the Silent Planet by C. S. Lewis, Martians are depicted as Christian beings free from original sin, the Martian Klaatu (Note: Although Klaatu's planet of origin is not named in the 1951 film, science fiction scholar Gary Westfahl notes that the information provided uniquely identifies it as Mars. See Klaatu (The Day the Earth Stood Still) § Analysis for further details.) who visits Earth in the 1951 film The Day the Earth Stood Still is a Christ figure, and the 1961 novel Stranger in a Strange Land by Robert A. Heinlein revolves around a human raised by Martians who brings a religion based on their ideals to Earth as a prophet. In comic books, the superhero Martian Manhunter first appeared in 1955. In the 1956 novel No Man Friday by Rex Gordon, an astronaut stranded on Mars encounters pacifist Martians and feels compelled to omit the human history of warfare lest they think of humans as savage creatures akin to cannibals. On television, the 1963–1966 sitcom My Favorite Martian—later adapted to children's animation in 1973 and to film in 1999—portrayed a Martian comedically; the contemporaneous science fiction anthology series The Twilight Zone and The Outer Limits also occasionally featured Martian characters, such as in "Mr. Dingle, the Strong" where they find disappointment in human lack of altruism and "Controlled Experiment" where murder is a foreign concept to them.

=== Evil ===
There is a long tradition of portraying Martians as warlike, perhaps inspired by the planet's association with the Roman god of war. The seminal depiction of Martians as evil creatures was the 1897 novel The War of the Worlds by H. G. Wells, wherein the Martians attack Earth. This characterization dominated the pulp era of science fiction, appearing in works such as the 1928 short story "The Menace of Mars" by Clare Winger Harris, the 1931 short story "Monsters of Mars" by Edmond Hamilton, and the 1935 short story "Mars Colonizes" by Miles J. Breuer. It quickly became regarded as a cliché and inspired a kind of countermovement that portrayed Martians as meek in works like the 1933 short story "The Forgotten Man of Space" by P. Schuyler Miller and the 1934 short story "Old Faithful" by Raymond Z. Gallun. The 1946 novel The Man from Mars by Polish science fiction writer Stanisław Lem likewise depicts a Martian mistreated by humans.

Outside of the pulps, the alien invasion theme pioneered by Wells appeared in Olaf Stapledon's 1930 novel Last and First Men—with the twist that the invading Martians are cloud-borne and microscopic, and neither aliens nor humans recognize the other as a sentient species. In film, this theme gained popularity in 1953 with the releases of The War of the Worlds and Invaders from Mars; later films about Martian invasions of Earth include the 1954 film Devil Girl from Mars, the 1962 film The Day Mars Invaded Earth, a 1986 remake of Invaders from Mars and three different adaptations of The War of the Worlds in 2005. Martians attacking humans who come to Mars appear in the 1948 short story "Mars Is Heaven!" by Ray Bradbury (later revised and included in The Martian Chronicles as "The Third Expedition"), where they use telepathic abilities to impersonate the humans' deceased loved ones before killing them. Comical portrayals of evil Martians appear in the 1954 novel Martians, Go Home by Fredric Brown, where they are little green men who wreak havoc by exposing secrets and lies; in the form of the cartoon character Marvin the Martian introduced in the 1948 short film "Haredevil Hare", who seeks to destroy Earth to get a better view of Venus; and in the 1996 film Mars Attacks!, a pastiche of 1950s alien invasion films.

=== Decadent ===
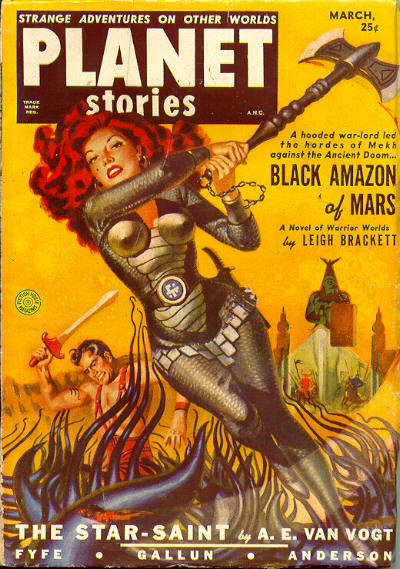
Decadent portrayals of Martians were popularized by Edgar Rice Burroughs, inspiring many authors such as Leigh Brackett. Seen here is the March 1951 cover of Planet Stories, featuring Brackett's "Black Amazon of Mars".

The conception of Martians as decadent was largely derived from Percival Lowell's vision of Mars. The first appearance of Martians characterized by decadence in a work of fiction was in the 1905 novel Lieut. Gullivar Jones: His Vacation by Edwin Lester Arnold—variously considered one of the earliest examples of, or an important precursor to, the planetary romance subgenre. The idea was developed further and popularized by Edgar Rice Burroughs in the 1912–1943 Barsoom series starting with A Princess of Mars. Burroughs presents a Mars in need of human intervention to regain its vitality, a place where violence has replaced sexual desire. Science fiction critic Robert Crossley, in the 2011 non-fiction book Imagining Mars: A Literary History, identifies Burroughs's work as the archetypal example of what he dubs "masculinist fantasies", where "male travelers expect to find princesses on Mars and devote much of their time either to courting or to protecting them". This version of Mars also functions as a kind of stand-in for the bygone American frontier, where protagonist John Carter—a Confederate veteran of the American Civil War who is made superhumanly strong by the lower gravity of Mars—encounters indigenous Martians corresponding to Native Americans.

Burroughs's vision of Mars would go on to have an influence approaching but not quite reaching Wells's, inspiring the works of many other authors—for instance, C. L. Moore's stories about Northwest Smith starting with the 1933 short story "Shambleau". Another author who followed Burroughs's lead in the decadent portrayal of Mars and its inhabitants—while updating the politics to reflect shifting attitudes toward colonialism and imperialism in the intervening years—was Leigh Brackett, the "Queen of the Planetary Romance". Brackett's works in this vein include the 1940 short story "Martian Quest" and the 1944 novel Shadow Over Mars, as well as the stories about Eric John Stark including the 1949 short story "Queen of the Martian Catacombs" and the 1951 short story "Black Amazon of Mars" (later expanded into the 1964 novels The Secret of Sinharat and People of the Talisman, respectively).

Decadent Martians appeared in many other stories as well. The 1933 novel Cat Country (貓城記) by Chinese science fiction writer Lao She portrays feline Martians overcome by vices such as opium addiction and corruption as a vehicle for satire of contemporary Chinese society. In the 1950 film Rocketship X-M, Martians are depicted as disfigured cavepeople inhabiting a barren wasteland, descendants of the few survivors of a nuclear holocaust; in the 1963 novel The Man Who Fell to Earth by Walter Tevis a survivor of nuclear holocaust on Mars comes to Earth for refuge but finds it to be similarly corrupt and degenerate. Inverting the premise of Heinlein's Stranger in a Strange Land, the 1963 short story "A Rose for Ecclesiastes" by Roger Zelazny sees decadent Martians visited by a preacher from Earth.

=== Past and non-humanoid life ===
In some stories where Mars is not inhabited by humanoid lifeforms, it was in the past or is inhabited by other types of life. The ruins of extinct Martian civilizations are depicted in the 1943 short story "Lost Art" by George O. Smith where their perpetual motion machine is recreated and the 1957 short story "Omnilingual" by H. Beam Piper in which scientists attempt to decipher their fifty-thousand-year-old language; the 1933 novel The Outlaws of Mars by Otis Adelbert Kline and the 1949 novel The Sword of Rhiannon by Leigh Brackett employ time travel to set stories in the past when Mars was still alive.

The 1934 short story "A Martian Odyssey" by Stanley G. Weinbaum contains what Webster describes as "the first really alien aliens" in science fiction, in contrast to previous depictions of Martians as monsters or essentially human. The story broke new ground in portraying an entire Martian ecosystem wholly unlike that of Earth—inhabited by species that are alien in anatomy and inscrutable in behaviour—and in depicting extraterrestrial life that is non-human and intelligent without being hostile. In particular, one Martian creature called Tweel is found to be intelligent but have thought processes that are utterly inhuman. This creates an impenetrable language barrier between the alien and the human it encounters, and they are limited to communicating through the universal language of mathematics. Asimov would later say that this story met the challenge science fiction editor John W. Campbell made to science fiction writers in the 1940s: to write a creature who thinks at least as well as humans, yet not like humans.

Three different species of intelligent lifeforms appear on Mars in C. S. Lewis's 1938 novel Out of the Silent Planet, only one of which is humanoid. In the 1943 short story "The Cave" by P. Schuyler Miller, lifeforms endure on Mars long after the civilization that used to exist there has driven itself to extinction through ecological collapse. The 1951 novel The Sands of Mars by Arthur C. Clarke features some indigenous life in the form of oxygen-producing plants and Martian creatures resembling Earth marsupials, but otherwise depicts a mostly desolate environment—reflecting then-emerging data about the scarcity of life-sustaining resources on Mars. Other novels of the 1950s likewise limited themselves to rudimentary lifeforms such as lichens and tumbleweed that could conceivably exist in the absence of any appreciable atmosphere or quantities of water.

=== Lifeless Mars ===
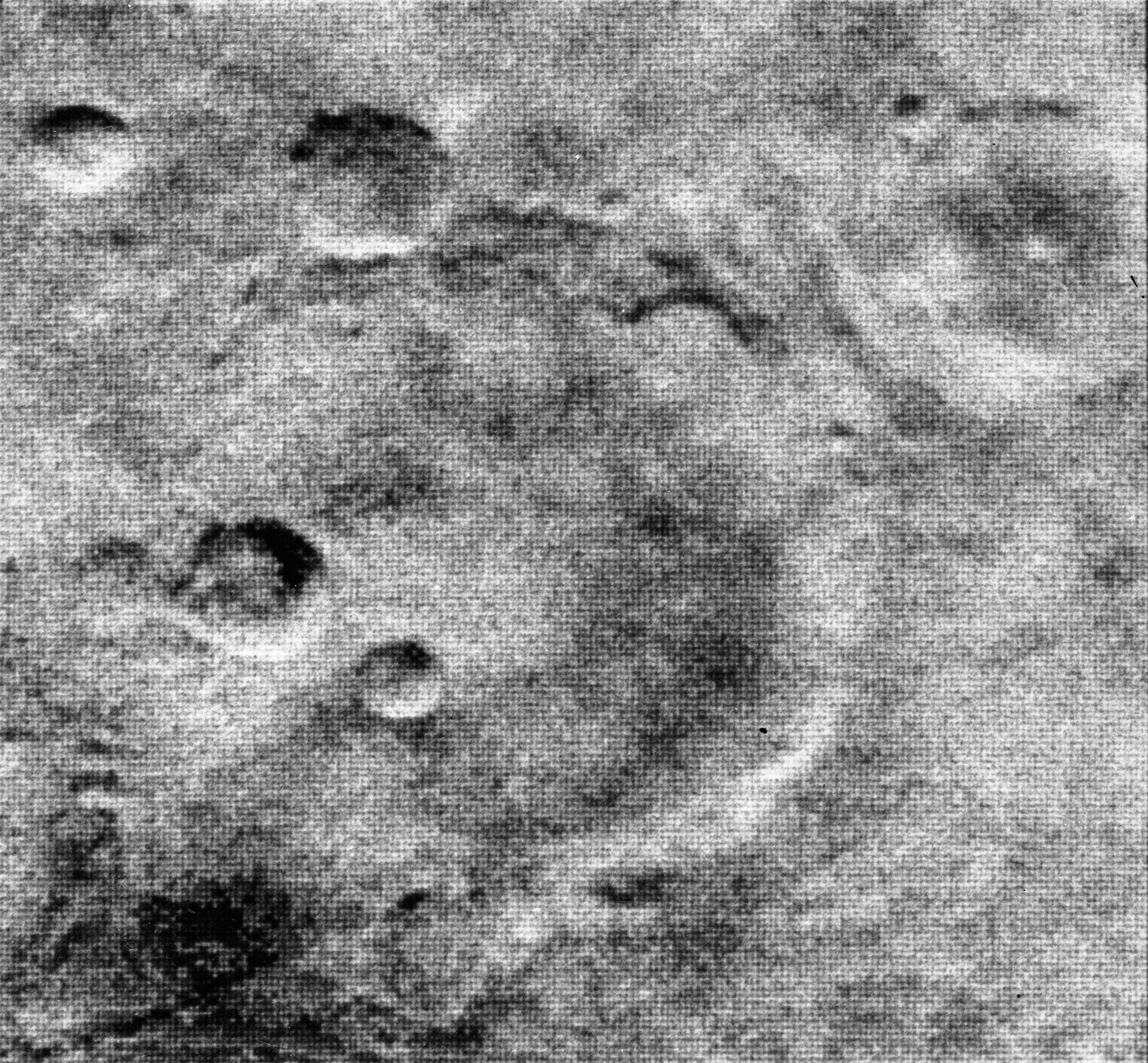
Data returned from Mars exploration missions in the 1960s and 1970s, such as this photograph by the Mariner 4 probe, led to stories of life on Mars becoming unfashionable.

In light of the Mariner and Viking probes to Mars between 1965 and 1976 revealing the planet's inhospitable conditions, almost all fiction started to portray Mars as a lifeless world. The disappointment of finding Mars to be hostile to life is reflected in the 1970 novel Die Erde ist nah (The Earth Is Near) by Czech science fiction writer Luděk Pešek, which depicts the members of an astrobiological expedition on Mars driven to despair by the realization that their search for life there is futile. A handful of authors still found ways to place life on the red planet: microbial life exists on Mars in the 1977 novel The Martian Inca by Ian Watson, and intelligent life is found in hibernation there in the 1977 short story "In the Hall of the Martian Kings" by John Varley. By the turn of the millennium, the idea of microbial life on Mars gained popularity, appearing in the 1999 novel The Martian Race by Gregory Benford and the 2001 novel The Secret of Life by Paul J. McAuley.

== Human survival ==
As stories about an inhabited Mars fell out of favour in the mid-1900s amid mounting evidence of the planet's inhospitable nature, they were replaced by stories about enduring the harsh conditions of the planet. Themes in this tradition include colonization, terraforming, and pure survival stories.

=== Colonization ===
The colonization of Mars became a major theme in science fiction in the 1950s. The central piece of Martian fiction in this era was Ray Bradbury's 1950 fix-up novel The Martian Chronicles, which contains a series of loosely connected stories depicting the first few decades of human efforts to colonize Mars. Unlike later works on this theme, The Martian Chronicles makes no attempt at realism (Mars has a breathable atmosphere, for instance, even though spectrographic analysis had at that time revealed no detectable amounts of oxygen); Bradbury said that "Mars is a mirror, not a crystal", a vehicle for social commentary rather than attempts to predict the future. Contemporary issues touched upon in the book include McCarthyism in "Usher II", racial segregation and lynching in the United States in "Way in the Middle of the Air", and nuclear anxiety throughout. There are also several allusions to the European colonization of the Americas: the first few missions to Mars in the book encounter Martians, with direct references to both Hernán Cortés and the Trail of Tears, but the indigenous population soon goes extinct due to chickenpox in a parallel to the virgin soil epidemics that devastated Native American populations as a result of the Columbian exchange.

The majority of works about colonizing Mars endeavoured to portray the challenges of doing so realistically. The hostile environment of the planet is countered by the colonists bringing life-support systems in works like the 1951 novel The Sands of Mars by Arthur C. Clarke and the 1966 short story "We Can Remember It for You Wholesale" by Philip K. Dick, the early colonists during the centuries-long terraforming process in the 1953 short story "Crucifixus Etiam" by Walter M. Miller Jr. are dependent on a machine that oxygenates their blood from the thin atmosphere, and the scarcity of oxygen even after generations of terraforming forces the colonists to live in a domed city in the 1953 novel Police Your Planet by Lester del Rey. In the 1955 fix-up novel Alien Dust by Edwin Charles Tubb, colonists are unable to return to a life on Earth because inhaling the Martian dust has given them pneumoconiosis and the lower gravity has atrophied their muscles. The 1952 novel Outpost Mars by Cyril Judd (joint pseudonym of Cyril M. Kornbluth and Judith Merril) revolves around an attempt at making a Mars colony economically sustainable by way of resource extraction.

Mars colonies seeking independence from or outright revolting against Earth is a recurring motif; in del Rey's Police Your Planet a revolution is precipitated by Earth using unrest against the colony's corrupt mayor as a pretext for bringing Mars under firmer Terran control, and in Tubb's Alien Dust the colonists threaten Earth with nuclear weapons unless their demands for necessary resources are met. In the 1952 short story "The Martian Way" by Isaac Asimov, Martian colonists extract water from the rings of Saturn so as not to depend on importing water from Earth. Besides direct conflicts with Earth, Mars colonies get other kinds of unfavourable treatment in several works. Mars is a dilapidated colony and neglected in favour of locations outside of the Solar System in the 1967 novel Born Under Mars by John Brunner, a place where political dissidents and criminals are exiled in Police Your Planet, and the site of an outright prison colony in the 1966 novel Farewell, Earth's Bliss by David G. Compton. The vision of Mars as a prison colony recurs in Japanese science fiction author Moto Hagio's 1978–1979 manga series Star Red (スター・レッド), a homage to Bradbury's The Martian Chronicles. The independence theme was adopted by on-screen portrayals of Mars colonies in the 1990s in works like the 1990 film Total Recall (a loose adaptation of Dick's "We Can Remember It for You Wholesale") and the 1994–1998 television series Babylon 5, now both in terms of Earth-based governments and—likely inspired by the emergence of Reaganomics—especially corporations.

=== Terraforming ===
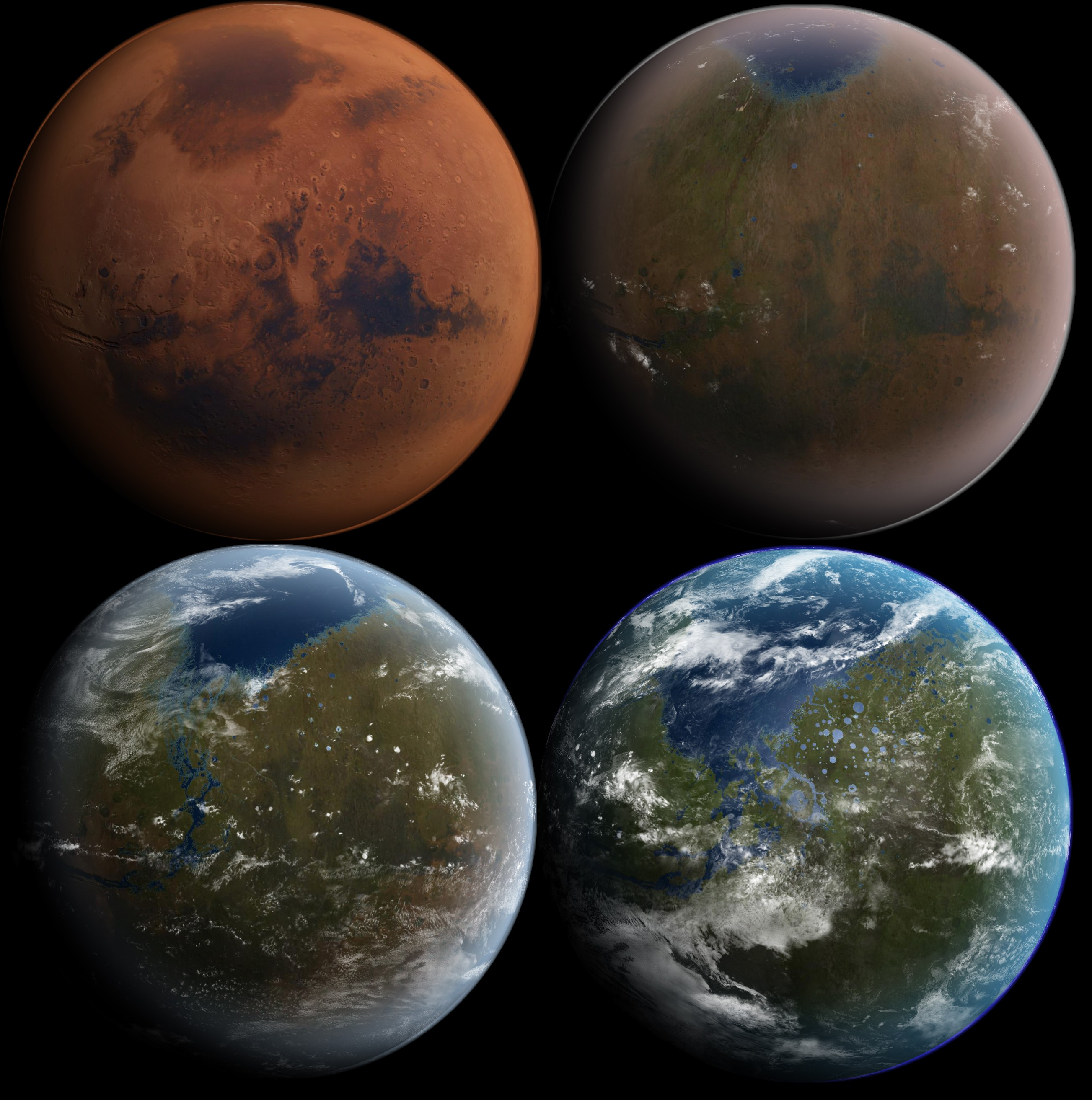
Some works depict Mars being terraformed to enable human habitation.

Clarke's The Sands of Mars features one of the earliest depictions of terraforming Mars to make it more hospitable to human life; in the novel, the atmosphere of Mars is made breathable by plants that release oxygen from minerals in the Martian soil, and the climate is improved by creating an artificial sun. The theme appeared occasionally in other 1950s works like the aforementioned "Crucifixus Etiam" and Police Your Planet, but largely fell out of favour in the 1960s as the scale of the associated challenges became apparent. By the 1970s, Martian literature as a whole had mostly succumbed to the discouragement of finding the planet's conditions to be so hostile, and stories set on Mars became much less common than they had been in previous decades.

A resurgence of popularity of the terraforming theme began to emerge in the late 1970s in light of data from the Viking probes suggesting that there might be substantial quantities of non-liquid and sub-surface water on Mars; among the earliest such works are the 1977 novel The Martian Inca by Ian Watson and the 1978 novel A Double Shadow by Frederick Turner. Works depicting the terraforming of Mars continued to appear throughout the 1980s. The 1984 novel The Greening of Mars by James Lovelock and Michael Allaby, a study on how Mars might be settled and terraformed presented in the form of a fiction narrative, was influential on science and fiction alike. Kim Stanley Robinson was an early prolific writer on the subject with the 1982 short story "Exploring Fossil Canyon", the 1984 novel Icehenge, and the 1985 short story "Green Mars". Turner revisited the concept in 1988 with Genesis, a 10,000-line epic poem written in iambic pentameter, and Ian McDonald combined terraforming with magical realism in the 1988 novel Desolation Road.

By the 1990s, terraforming had become the predominant theme in Martian fiction. Several methods for accomplishing it were depicted, including ancient alien artefacts in the 1990 film Total Recall and the 1997 novel Mars Underground by William Kenneth Hartmann, utilizing indigenous animal lifeforms in the 1991 novel Martian Rainbow by Robert L. Forward, and relocating the entire planet to a new solar system in the 1993 novel Moving Mars by Greg Bear. The 1993 novel Red Dust by Paul J. McAuley portrays Mars in the process of reverting to its natural state after an abandoned attempt at terraforming it. With a Mars settled primarily by China, Red Dust also belongs to a tradition of portraying a multicultural Mars that developed parallel to the rise to prominence of the terraforming theme. Other such works include the 1989 novel Crescent in the Sky by Donald Moffitt, where Arabs apply their experience with surviving in desert conditions to living in their new caliphate on a partially terraformed Mars, and the 1991 novel The Martian Viking by Tim Sullivan where Mars is terraformed by Geats led by Hygelac.

The most prominent work of fiction dealing with the subject of terraforming Mars is the Mars trilogy by Kim Stanley Robinson (consisting of the novels Red Mars from 1992, Green Mars from 1993, and Blue Mars from 1996), a hard science fiction story of a United Nations project wherein 100 carefully selected scientists are sent to Mars to start the first settlement there. The series explores in depth the practical and ideological considerations involved, the principal one being whether to turn Mars "Green" by terraforming or keep it in its pristine "Red" state. Other major topics besides the ethics of terraforming include the social and economic organization of the emerging Martian society and its political relationship to Earth and the multinational economic interests that finance the mission, revisiting the earlier themes of Mars as a setting for utopia—albeit in this case one in the making rather than a pre-existing one—and Martian struggle for independence from Earth.

Alternatives to terraforming have also been explored. The opposite approach of modifying humans to adapt them to the existing environment, known as pantropy, appears in the 1976 novel Man Plus by Frederik Pohl but has otherwise been sparsely depicted. The conflict between pantropy and terraforming is explored in the 1994 novel Climbing Olympus by Kevin J. Anderson, as the humans that have been "areoformed" to survive on Mars do not wish the planet to be altered to accommodate unmodified humans at their expense. Other works where terraforming is eschewed in favour of alternatives include the 1996 novel River of Dust by Alexander Jablokov, where the settlers create a liveable environment by burrowing underground, and the 1999 novel White Mars, or, The Mind Set Free: A 21st-Century Utopia by Brian Aldiss and Roger Penrose where environmental preservation is prioritized and humans live in domed cities.

=== Robinsonades ===
Martian robinsonades—stories of astronauts stranded on Mars—emerged in the 1950s with works such as the 1952 novel Marooned on Mars by Lester del Rey, the 1956 novel No Man Friday by Rex Gordon, and the 1959 short story "The Man Who Lost the Sea" by Theodore Sturgeon. Crossley writes that No Man Friday is in some respects an "anti-robinsonade", inasmuch as it rejects the underlying colonialist attitudes and portrays the Martians as more advanced than humans rather than less. Robinsonades remained popular throughout the 1960s; examples include the 1966 novel Welcome to Mars by James Blish and the 1964 film Robinson Crusoe on Mars, the latter being significantly if unofficially based on No Man Friday. The subgenre was later revisited with the 2011 novel The Martian by Andy Weir and its 2015 film adaptation, in which an astronaut accidentally left behind by the third mission to Mars uses the resources available to him to survive until such a time that he can be rescued.

== Nostalgic depictions ==
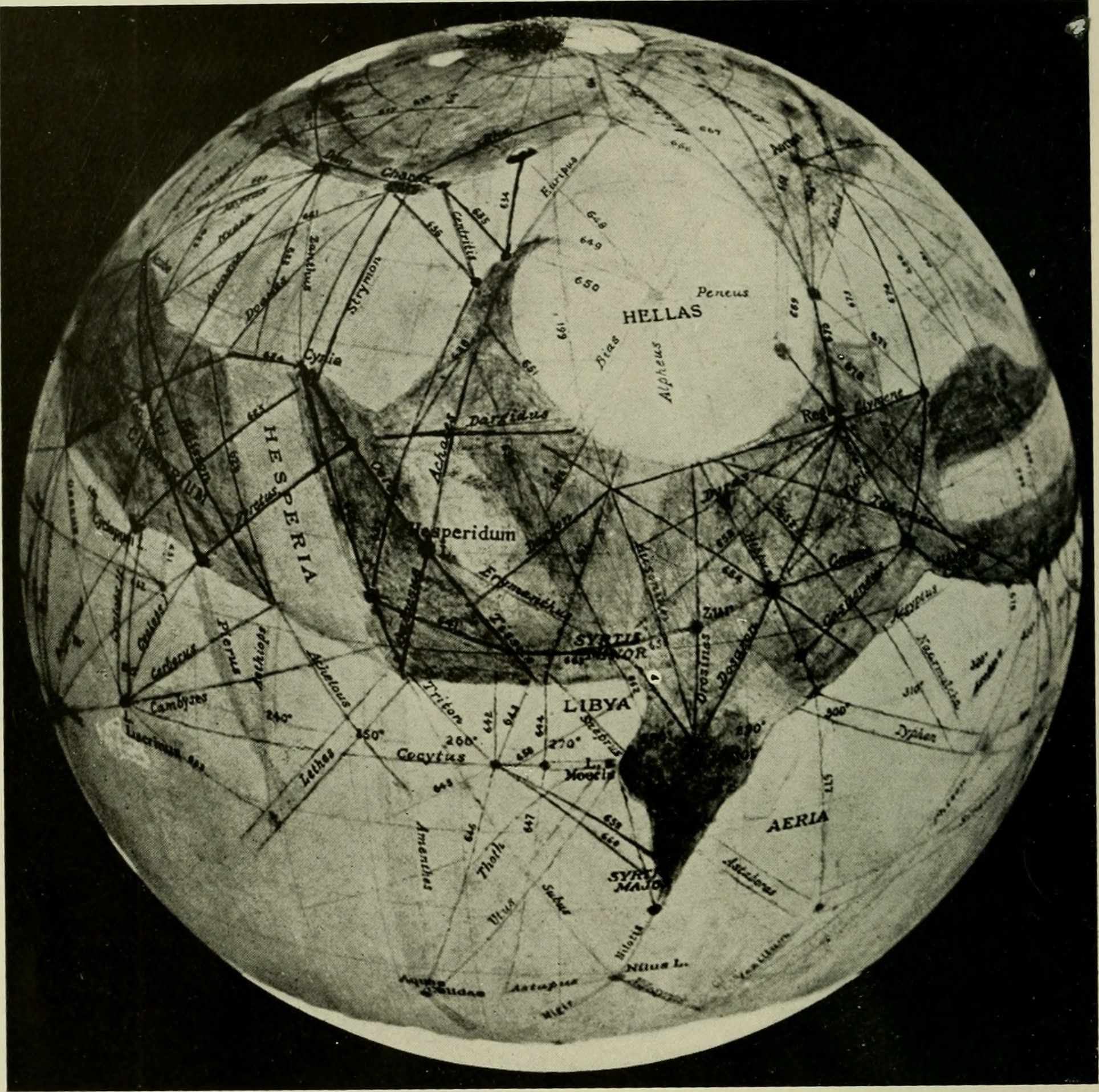
Globe of Mars based on drawing by Percival Lowell, featuring the purported Martian canals

Although most stories by the middle of the 1900s acknowledged that advances in planetary science had rendered previous notions about the conditions of Mars obsolete and portrayed the planet accordingly, some continued to depict a romantic version of Mars rather than a realistic one. Besides the stories of Ray Bradbury's 1950 fix-up novel The Martian Chronicles, another early example of this was Robert A. Heinlein's 1949 novel Red Planet where Mars has a breathable (albeit thin) atmosphere, a diverse ecosystem including sentient Martians, and Lowellian canals. Martian canals remained a prominent symbol of this more traditional vision of Mars, appearing both in lighthearted works like the 1954 novel Martians, Go Home by Fredric Brown and more serious ones like the 1963 novel The Man Who Fell to Earth by Walter Tevis and the 1964 novel Martian Time-Slip by Philip K. Dick. Some works attempted to reconcile both visions of Mars, one example being the 1952 novel Marooned on Mars by Lester del Rey where the presumed canals turn out to be rows of vegetables and the only animal life is primitive.

As the Space Age commenced the divide between portraying Mars as it was and as it had previously been imagined deepened, and the discoveries made by Mariner 4 in 1965 solidified it. Some authors simply ignored the scientific findings, such as Lin Carter who included intelligent Martians in the 1973 novel The Man Who Loved Mars, and Leigh Brackett who declared in the foreword to The Coming of the Terrans (a 1967 collection of earlier short stories) that "in the affairs of men and Martians, mere fact runs a poor second to Truth, which is mighty and shall prevail". Others were cognizant of them and used workarounds: Frank Herbert invented the fictional extrasolar Mars-like planet Arrakis for the 1965 novel Dune rather than setting the story on Mars, Robert F. Young set the 1979 short story "The First Mars Mission" in 1957 so as not to have to take the findings of Mariner 4 into account, and Colin Greenland set the 1993 novel Harm's Way in the 1800s with corresponding scientific concepts like the luminiferous aether. The 1965 novel The Alternate Martians by A. Bertram Chandler is based on the premise that the depictions of Mars that appear in older stories are not incorrect but reflect alternative universes; the book is dedicated to "the Mars that used to be, but never was". The urge to recapture the romantic vision of Mars is reflected as part of the story in the 1968 novel Do Androids Dream of Electric Sheep? by Philip K. Dick, where the people living on a desolate Mars enjoy reading old stories about the lifeful Mars that never was, as well as in the 1989 novel The Barsoom Project by Steven Barnes and Larry Niven, where the fantastical version of Mars is recreated as an amusement park.

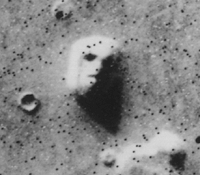
The so-called "Face on Mars", photographed by Viking 1 in 1976 (the black dots are missing data errors). Later higher-quality images (such as this one by Mars Global Surveyor in 2001) do not resemble a face.

Following the arrival of the Viking probes in 1976, the so-called "Face on Mars" superseded the Martian canals as the most central symbol of nostalgic depictions of Mars. The "Face" is a rock formation in the Cydonia region of Mars first photographed by the Viking 1 orbiter under conditions that made it resemble a human face; higher-quality photographs taken by subsequent probes under different lighting conditions revealed this to be a case of pareidolia. It was popularized by Richard C. Hoagland, who interpreted it as an artificial construction by intelligent extraterrestrials, and has appeared in works of fiction including the 1992 novel Labyrinth of Night by Allen Steele, the 1995 short story "The Great Martian Pyramid Hoax" by Jerry Oltion, and the 1998 novel Semper Mars by Ian Douglas. Outside of literature, it has made appearances in the 1993 episode "Space" of The X-Files, the 2000 film Mission to Mars, and the 2002 episode "Where the Buggalo Roam" of the animated television show Futurama.

Deliberately nostalgic homages to older works have continued to appear through the turn of the millennium. In the 1999 novel Rainbow Mars by Larry Niven, a time traveller goes to visit Mars's past but instead appears in the parallel universe of Mars's fictional past and encounters the creations of science fiction authors such as H. G. Wells and Edgar Rice Burroughs. Stories collected in Peter Crowther's 2002 anthology Mars Probes pay tribute to the works of Stanley G. Weinbaum and Leigh Brackett, among others. The 2013 anthology Old Mars edited by George R. R. Martin and Gardner Dozois consists of newly written stories in the planetary romance style of older stories whose visions of Mars are now outdated; Martin compared it to the common practice of setting Westerns in a romanticized version of the Old West rather than a more realistic one.

== First landings and near-future human presence ==
Stories about the first human mission to Mars became popular after US president George H. W. Bush announced the Space Exploration Initiative in 1989, which proposed to accomplish this feat by 2019, though the concept had earlier appeared indirectly in the 1977 film Capricorn One, wherein NASA fakes the Mars landing. Among these are the 1992 novel Beachhead by Jack Williamson and the 1992 novel Mars in Ben Bova's Grand Tour series, both of which emphasize the barrenness of the Martian landscape upon arrival and contrast it with a desire to find beauty there. The idea was spoofed in the 1990 novel Voyage to the Red Planet by Terry Bisson, which posits that a mission like that could only get funding by being turned into a movie. Stephen Baxter's 1996 novel Voyage depicts an alternate history where US president John F. Kennedy was not assassinated in 1963, ultimately leading to the first Mars landing happening in 1986. The 1999 novel The Martian Race by Gregory Benford adapts the Mars Direct proposal by aerospace engineer Robert Zubrin to fiction by depicting a private sector competition to conduct the first crewed Mars landing with a large monetary reward attached. Zubrin would later write a story of his own along the same lines: the 2001 novel First Landing. In a variation on the theme, Ian McDonald's 2002 short story "The Old Cosmonaut and the Construction Worker Dream of Mars" (included in the aforementioned anthology Mars Probes) portrays the lingering yearning for Mars in a future where the intended first Mars landing was cancelled and the era of space exploration has come to an end without the dream of a human mission to Mars ever being realized.

Beyond the events of the first crewed landing on Mars, this time period also saw an increase in portrayals of the early stages of exploration and settlement happening in the near future, especially following the 1996 launches of the Mars Pathfinder and Mars Global Surveyor probes. In the 1991 novel Red Genesis by S. C. Sykes, settlement of Mars begins in 2015, though the bulk of the narrative is set decades later and focuses on the social—rather than technical—challenges of the project. The 1997 novel Mars Underground by William K. Hartmann also deals with the early efforts of establishing a permanent human presence on the red planet. The members of the third human mission to Mars are forced to trek across the planet's surface in the 2000 novel Mars Crossing by Geoffrey A. Landis to reach a return vehicle from a previous mission after theirs is damaged beyond repair.

== In the new millennium ==
[Mars] offers an accessible and somewhat-known-but-somewhat-mysterious setting for all kinds of imaginative storylines. For this reason, video games love using Mars-related maps or themes – colonisation, space travel, dying and dystopian societies, scientific research settlements gone wrong, cosmic war, aliens, the unknown.

— Nicky Jenner, 4th Rock from the Sun: The Story of Mars

In the year 2000, Westfahl estimated the total number of works of fiction dealing with Mars up to that point to exceed five thousand. Depictions of Mars have remained common since then, though without a clear overarching trend—rather, says The Encyclopedia of Science Fiction, Mars fiction has "ramified in several directions". Monster movies set on Mars have appeared throughout this time period including the 2001 film Ghosts of Mars, the 2005 film Doom (based on the video game franchise), and the 2013 film The Last Days on Mars. In the 2003 novel Ilium by Dan Simmons and its 2005 sequel Olympos, the Trojan War is reenacted on Mars, and the 2011 animated film Mars Needs Moms revisits the older theme of evil Martians coming to Earth, though with more modest ambitions than launching an all-out invasion. The 2011–2021 novel series The Expanse by James S. A. Corey (joint pseudonym of Daniel Abraham and Ty Franck), starting with Leviathan Wakes, is a space opera set in part on Mars that was originally based on a role-playing game and later adapted to a 2015–2022 television series. Tom Chmielewski's 2014 novel Lunar Dust, Martian Sands is a piece of noir fiction set partially on Mars. The Martian—book and film—is hard science fiction; the film adaptation was described by the production team as being "as much science fact as science fiction". The 100th anniversary of Burroughs's A Princess of Mars in 2012 saw the release of both the film adaptation John Carter and an anthology of new Barsoom fiction: Under the Moons of Mars: New Adventures on Barsoom edited by John Joseph Adams. In Polish science fiction, Rafał Kosik's 2003 novel Mars depicts people migrating to Mars to escape an Earth ravaged by overpopulation, and an anthology of short stories titled Mars: Antologia polskiej fantastyki (Mars: An Anthology of Polish Fantasy) was published in 2021. Mars has also made frequent appearances in video games; examples include the 2001 game Red Faction which is set on Mars and the 2014 game Destiny where Mars is an unlockable setting. In addition, Mars continues to make regular appearances in stories where it is not the main focus, such as Joe Haldeman's 2008 novel Marsbound. Says Crossley, "Where imagined Mars will go as the twenty-first century unfolds cannot be prophesied, because—undoubtedly—improbable, original, and masterful talents will work new variations on the matter of Mars."

== Moons ==
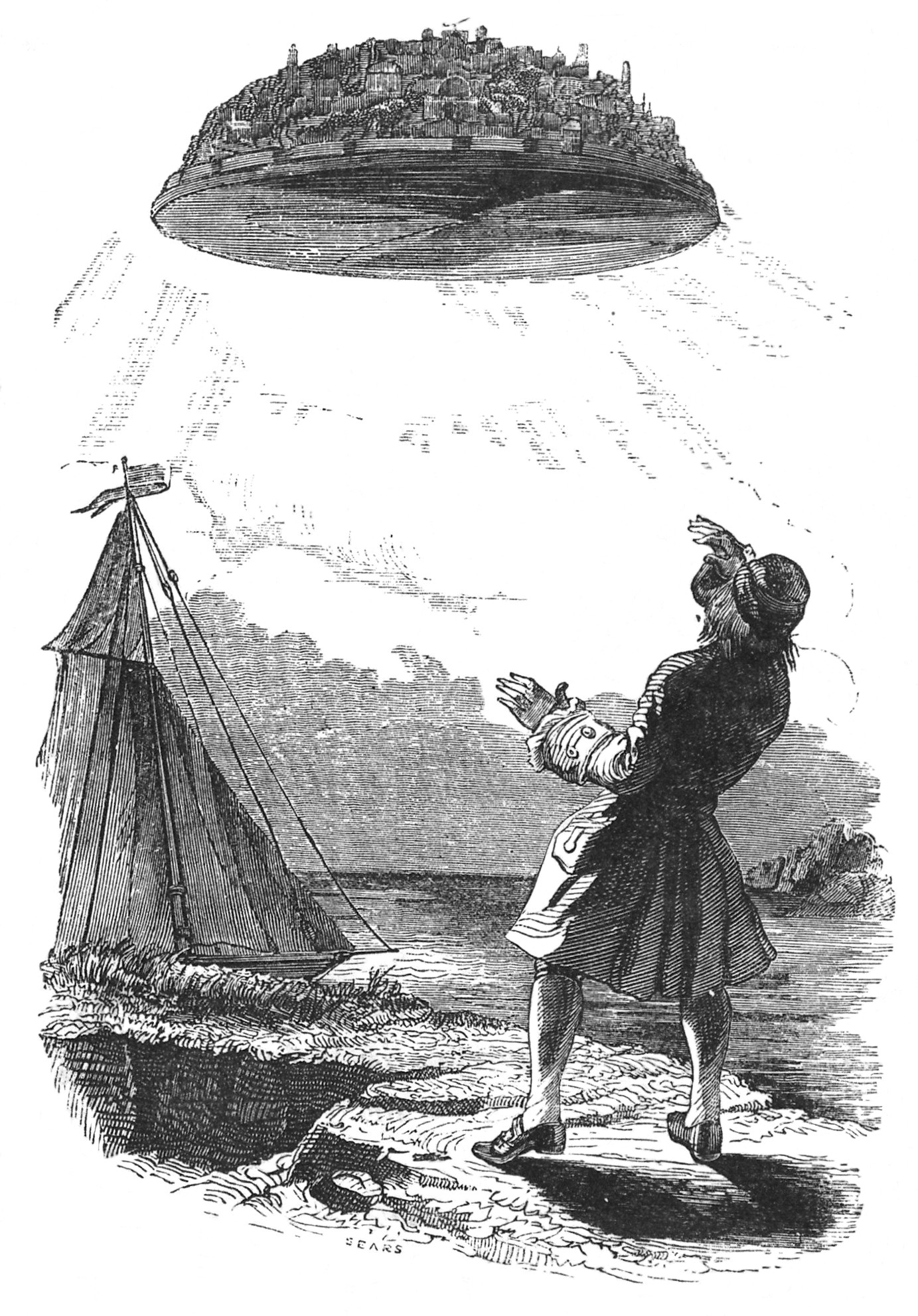
The flying island of Laputa in Gulliver's Travels. The mention that its astronomers have discovered two Martian moons is their earliest appearance in fiction.

Mars has two small moons, Phobos and Deimos, which were both discovered by Asaph Hall in 1877. The first appearance of the moons of Mars in fiction predates their discovery by a century and a half; the satirical 1726 novel Gulliver's Travels by Jonathan Swift includes a mention that the advanced astronomers of Laputa have discovered two Martian moons. (Note: See Moons of Mars § Jonathan Swift for further details.) The 1752 work Micromégas by Voltaire likewise mentions two moons of Mars; astronomy historian William Sheehan surmises that Voltaire was inspired by Swift. German astronomer Eberhard Christian Kindermann, mistakenly believing that he had discovered a Martian moon, described a fictional voyage to it in the 1744 story "Die Geschwinde Reise" ("The Speedy Journey").

The moons' small sizes have made them unpopular settings in science fiction, (Note: In the catalogue of early science fiction works compiled by E. F. Bleiler and Richard Bleiler in the reference works Science-Fiction: The Early Years from 1990 and Science-Fiction: The Gernsback Years from 1998, the Martian moons only appear in 8 (out of 2,475) and 11 (out of 1,835) works respectively, compared to 194 for Mars itself and 131 for Venus in The Gernsback Years alone.) with some exceptions—mainly in the case of Phobos—such as the 1955 novel Phobos, the Robot Planet by Paul Capon and the 2001 short story "Romance with Phobic Variations" by Tom Purdom. Besides appearing as settings, the Martian moons are also treated as objects in several stories. The destruction of one or both of the moons is a recurring motif, as in the 1936 short story "Crystals of Madness" by D. L. James where Deimos is destroyed intentionally. Phobos is turned into a small star to provide heat and light to Mars in the 1951 novel The Sands of Mars by Arthur C. Clarke. The moons are revealed to be alien spacecraft in the 1955 juvenile novel The Secret of the Martian Moons by Donald A. Wollheim.

== See also ==
- Mars in culture
- List of films set on Mars
- Great Science Fiction Stories About Mars – 1966 short story anthology
