= Tweel (disambiguation) =

Tweel is an airless tire design concept developed by the French tire company Michelin.

Tweel may also refer to:

- Tweel (A Martian Odyssey), a creature in Stanley G. Weinbaum's short story
- Jeff Tweel, songwriter: see Category:Songs written by Jeff Tweel

== See also ==
- Tuile (/twiːl/), a baked wafer
