= Stanley Hough =

Stanley Hough may refer to:

- Stan Hough (1918–1990), American movie executive and film and television producer
- Stanley Bennett Hough (1917–1998), British author, also known as Rex Gordon.
- Stanley M. Hough (born 1948), American racehorse trainer
