= Enchantress of Venus =

1949 short story by Leigh Brackett

The Fall 1949 issue of Planet Stories.

"Enchantress of Venus" (also published as "City of the Lost Ones") is a science fiction short story by American writer Leigh Brackett. It was originally published in the magazine Planet Stories in 1949. It is part of the Eric John Stark series of books and stories. The story has been reprinted numerous times since its first publication, and has been the subject of critical commentary in the Science Fiction community.

== Plot summary ==
"Enchantress of Venus" is a story about a man known as Stark and his adventure to Inner Venus, specifically the town of Shuruun, to find his missing friend Helvi. Stark was taken to this town by boat captain Malthor. The captain offered Stark a place to stay, but Stark denied the offer. Malthor attacked Stark from behind, causing Stark to jump into the mysterious Red Sea. Stark swims to the town and sees the people who are shocked to see someone with such a dark complexion. Stark is approached by Malthor’s young daughter, Zareth, who warns him of the plans of her father, and tells him about the Lhari who are basically the royalty of the town. Stark is enslaved by these people and put to work with other slaves beneath the sea excavating a hidden City left by previous occupants who knew aspects of science now lost, which the Lhari seek. Once enslaved, Stark finds Helvi and meets a woman by the name of Varra. They manage to free themselves, and Stark leads the slave rebellion. Stark kills the Lhari with the help of his fellow slaves. Then Stark and most of the slaves, the ones that weren’t born there, leave via spaceship.

== Characters ==
- Erik John Stark, the protagonist, who appears in several of Leigh Brackett's Solar System space opera works. After traveling to the planet Venus in an attempt to rescue his close friend Helvi, he became a prisoner to the Lhari beneath the “shrouding veils of mist” of the Red Sea. His physical appearance is described throughout the novel as “dark” in nature and his stature is that of a “big man”.
- Zareth Malthor, the captain of a freighter ship and a slave to the Lhari. He has a vendetta throughout the story to kill Stark because he was viciously attacked by him after first attempting to kill him in the opening pages of the novel.
- Lhari are a group of “Cloud People” who are seen as six “god-like” figures that separate themselves from the people of the “swamps” of the planet. They possess many slaves which do their bidding beneath the Red Sea. There is a division between the various members mainly that of Varra and Egil who are bidding to discover technology that will “do amazing things to human tissue”.
- Zareth, the young girl who is seen as a “stupid” and weak feminine character who confronts Stark looking for him to help her escape from her father Malthor.
