= First on Mars =

First on Mars may refer to:

- First on Mars (website), a web application that aggregates links to cable and network TV shows
- No Man Friday, a British science fiction novel known in the USA as First on Mars
