= The Secret of Sinharat =

1964 novel by Leigh Brackett

- Cover of first edition.
- Author: Leigh Brackett
- Language: English
- Genre: Science fiction
- Publisher: Ace Books
- Publication date: 1964
- Publication place: United States
- Media type: Print (Paperback)
- Pages: 95
- Followed by: People of the Talisman

Map of Mars in the fiction of Leigh Brackett.

The Secret of Sinharat is a science fantasy novel by American writer Leigh Brackett, set on the planet Mars, whose protagonist is Eric John Stark. The novel is expanded from the novella "Queen of the Martian Catacombs", published in the pulp magazine Planet Stories in the Summer 1949 issue.

== Publication history ==
Queen of the Martian Catacombs in Planet Stories, Summer 1949.

This story was first published under the title Queen of the Martian Catacombs in the pulp magazine Planet Stories, Summer 1949.

In 1964, after considerable revision and expansion, it was republished as The Secret of Sinharat as one part of an Ace Double novel; its companion was another expanded Eric John Stark story, People of the Talisman. The expansion has sometimes been attributed to Brackett's husband, Edmond Hamilton.

In 1982, it was published again, together with People of the Talisman, under the title Eric John Stark, Outlaw of Mars.

In 2005 the original Planet Stories version was republished in Sea-Kings of Mars and Otherworldly Stories, Volume 46 in the Gollancz Fantasy Masterworks series. It appeared the same year in the collection Stark and the Star Kings (Haffner Press).

In 2008, the entire Eric John Stark saga was republished in E-Book form by Baen Publishing.

== Sources ==
- Tuck, Donald H. (1974). The Encyclopedia of Science Fiction and Fantasy. Chicago: Advent. p. 28. ISBN 0-911682-20-1.
