= Alpha Centauri or Die! =

1963 novel by Leigh Brackett

- First edition
- Author: Leigh Brackett
- Cover artist: Jack Gaughan
- Language: English
- Genre: Science fiction
- Publisher: Ace Books
- Publication date: 1963 (first book publication)
- Publication place: United States
- Media type: Print (Paperback)
- Pages: 121
- OCLC: 33273412

Alpha Centauri or Die! is a science fiction novel by American writer Leigh Brackett.

== Publication ==
The novel is a fixup of two earlier short stories, "The Ark of Mars" (first published in the September 1953 issue of Planet Stories) and "Teleportress of Alpha C" (first published in the Winter 1954-1955 Planet Stories). Its first book publication was as half of Ace Double F-187 with Legend of Lost Earth by G. McDonald Wallis.

== Summary ==
In the future, crewed interstellar flight is forbidden with only the government's robotic spaceships being permitted. Attempting to escape the regime, Kirby, a former starship pilot, and his wife Shari construct the "Ark of Mars", a refitted freighter named the Lucy B. Davenport and with their crew set out to a habitable planet around Alpha Centauri. They run through the government blockades and defeat a robotic pursuit ship in battle, before setting out on a five-year voyage to the new planet. However, after arriving, they begin to realize that they are not alone...

== Influence and reception ==
Rich Horton's review was mixed. He felt that the novel didn't have "the frisson of Dunsany-esque fantastical imagery that so drives her best work," concluding that it was "[m]ediocre stuff, really, though Brackett is never unreadable, and I did enjoy the book."
