= The Sword of Rhiannon =

1949 novel by Leigh Brackett

- First book publication
- Author: Leigh Brackett
- Cover artist: Robert E. Schulz
- Language: English
- Genre: Science fiction
- Publisher: Ace Books
- Publication date: 1953 (first book publication)
- Publication place: United States
- Media type: Print (Paperback)
- Pages: 131
- OCLC: 4880559

The Sword of Rhiannon is a science fantasy novel by American writer Leigh Brackett, set in her usual venue of Mars. A 1942 Brackett story, "The Sorcerer of Rhiannon", also uses the name; however, it is the name of a place rather than a character.

== Publication ==
The novel was first published in the June 1949 issue of Thrilling Wonder Stories as "Sea-Kings of Mars". Its first book publication was in the early Ace Double D-36 with Conan the Conqueror by Robert E. Howard.

== Summary ==
The protagonist is Matthew Carse, a 35-year-old former archaeologist turned thief in the Martian city of Jekkara. He is approached by Penkawr, who attempts to coerce Carse into helping him sell the sword of Rhiannon, a relic stolen from a Martian tomb. Rhiannon was a legendary figure from the ancient Martian race of the Quiru who made the Promethean decision to share Quiru science with another race of Martians, the Dhuvians. Like Prometheus, his actions did not go unpunished: he was sealed in a tomb and became known to history as "The Cursed One". The Quiru left Mars to the Dhuvians and other sentient races soon afterward.

Carse accompanies Penkawr into the tomb to loot it but is transfixed by a sphere he finds within. Penkawr pushes Carse into it, sending him back to the lush Mars of the Sea-Kings. The Sea-Kings are engaged in war with the Empire of Sark, allied with the Dhuvians, and both sides wish to obtain the artifacts in Rhiannon's tomb. Carse, of course, is the only person who knows the location of the tomb, though he is uneasy. As he journeyed back, he felt that another presence had joined him.

Carse is taken captive by Lady Ywain of Sark and becomes a galley slave on her ship. Also serving as a galley slave is Boghaz, a fat, lazy criminal and merchant who initially seems more than happy to sell Carse out. However, Ywain realises that Carse possessed the Sword of Rhiannon and they attempt to extract the location of the tomb from his mind. Carse resists, with the aid of the mysterious presence, and he leads the galley slaves in mutiny.

Arriving at the realm of the Sea-Kings, the noblewoman Emer senses the presence in Carse, who offers to reveal the location of the tomb. The presence in Carse's mind reveals itself to be Rhiannon himself, seeking atonement for the crimes he committed eons before and the last, desperate struggle to save the planet reaches its conclusion as the whole world changes around them.

== Influence and reception ==
Rich Horton reviewed the Ace Double edition as "really wonderful pulp Sword and Sorcery, pitch perfect, beautifully written, twistily plotted. The resolution is deeply romantic, with a shadow of true sadness."

The Encyclopedia of Science Fiction described it as "perhaps the finest" of Brackett's Mars novels, "concisely and eloquently written ... admirably combines adventure with a strongly romantic vision of an ancient sea-girt Martian civilization, which is described with a remarkable combination of freshness and nostalgia."
