= Tweel (A Martian Odyssey) =

Fictional extraterrestrial

Tweel (also referred to as a "Tweerl", the exact pronunciation of the word is said to be impossible for humans) is a fictional extraterrestrial from the planet Mars, featured in two short stories by Stanley G. Weinbaum. The alien was featured in A Martian Odyssey, first published in 1934, and Valley of Dreams four months later. Weinbaum died of lung cancer soon after, and a third installment in the series never saw fruition. Tweel remains one of the most recognised aliens in early science fiction, and is said to be an inspiration for aliens in the works of Isaac Asimov and Arthur C. Clarke.

Asimov described Tweel as being the first creation in science fiction to fulfill John W. Campbell's request for "(...)a creature that thinks as well as a man, or better than a man, but not like a man." According to Jacques Baudou, Tweel is the first non-anthropomorphic thinking creature represented in American science fiction.

== Appearance ==
Tweel's appearance is described as follows:

The Martian wasn't a bird, really. It wasn't even bird-like, except at first glance. It had a beak, alright, and a few feathery appendages, but the beak wasn't really a beak. It was somewhat flexible; I could see the tip bend from side to side; it was almost like a cross between a beak and a trunk. It had four toed feet, and four fingered things—hands, you'd have to call them, a little roundish body, and a long neck ending in a tiny head—and that beak.

—A Martian Odyssey, paragraph 24.

Illustration of the Egyptian god Thoth, revealed by Weinbaum to be based on millennia-old visits to Earth by Tweel's species.

== Species ==
In the second story in the series, Valley of Dreams, Tweel's species is revealed to be known as the Thoth: Tweel shows its human companions an ancient Martian mural portraying its species surrounded by what are recognizably ancient Egyptians. When one human describes the mural as resembling the Egyptian god Thoth, Tweel's response is "Yes! Yes! Yes! Thoth! Yes!"; the humans then realize that Martians - collectively known as "Thoth" - visited ancient Egypt, where they gave humans the gift of writing and were perceived as gods.

The Thoth are neither animal nor plant, but something else altogether, which humans could consider to be in-between a plant and an animal judging by the standards set by life which has evolved on planet Earth. The Thoth do not sleep, nor eat or drink. For a few hours each Martian day, they stick their beaks into the Martian soil. They gain nutrients from the soil, in a similar way to how the roots of a plant gain nutrients from the ground. The Thoth reproduce asexually, with two members of the species making contact for a small amount of time until an infant "buds" between the two.

The creatures are highly active and agile, and usually travel in tremendous, city-block-long leaps through the thin Martian air and also aided by the weak Martian gravity. These leaps end with the long beak buried in the ground, as the secondary function of this beak is to stop the creature. They can leap up the Martian cliffs and across valleys with ease. However, they can also move slowly by walking. Upon seeing Jarvis (the human protagonist), trudge along, Tweel walks beside him.

Although the Thoth are more or less humanoid in appearance, their physiology is remarkably different from that of humans; one example of this would be the fact that their brain in located in the chest, and not the head. The Thoth have feather-like appendages that protect them from the chilly Martian nights very well, but these are retracted and invisible during the day. Different members of this species have different-coloured feathers; Tweel's feathers are orange. The Thoth also have sharp retractable claws, but they are very rarely exposed, and only used for defense. The Thoth have an exceptionally unassuming and friendly nature, but are also formidable opponents when backed into a corner.

== Psychology and intelligence ==
Tweel is a very intelligent creature, despite the fact that he thinks very differently from humans. When Jarvis, the story's protagonist, draws the first four inner planets and the sun in the sand, Tweel successfully identifies Mars as the fourth planet, and the Earth as the third. He therefore is civilized, but he thinks differently from humans, for he jumps directly into the circle in the sand that represents the sun on its beak, which he does not consider unusual at all.

The Thoth communicate in distinct forms of whistles, clicks, and shrills, and also have a system of writing for which they use a mysterious kind of leathery paper. The human protagonist explains this system of writing merely looks like circles and spirals, but yet is too complicated for humans to translate, and is far too alien for humans to grasp. The language of the Thoth is also exceptionally complex, with no one word for anything—every time something is described, it will never be described in the same way any two times. The human protagonist, Jarvis, cannot grasp even a faint light of this language. The central alien, Tweel, is able to grasp various words in the human's language, English, such as "breet" (supposed to be "breathe") to designate living creatures, "no breet" for inanimate objects, "rock" to indicate silicon-based life forms, "one one two" to indicate a rudimentary level of intelligence, and "two two four" for a higher level of intelligence. With these smatterings of human language, Tweel puts forward advanced ideas and concepts, thus proving he is intelligent. Tweel does however find it incredibly strange and even funny that humans use the same words for the same purpose more than once, whereas he does not.

== Civilization ==
The Thoths' civilization is apparently old and ragged, much older than human civilization, and the Thoth still remain advanced in terms of intelligence. Vast ruined buildings are all that remains of their cities which evidently once thrived and housed millions (the architecture of the buildings is odd as the bases are small but widen out as they get higher). Much of their technology has since been lost to history as the limited natural resources of Mars were completely depleted long ago. Only a few hundred Thoth remain on the dying world.

It is hinted that devilish, rat-like creatures (described in another short story of Weinbaum's, The Mad Moon as "Slinkers") are the cause of their cities' demise. One Slinker is described either reading or eating a page of a book in a great Thoth library, before being scared off by Tweel.

The Thoth never developed nuclear power, but evidently had some other power source which has since been lost to them. It is suggested that Tweel's race travelled across the Solar System at least 10,000 years ago, as Jarvis, Tweel's human partner and the protagonist of A Martian Odyssey describes seeing three eyes in the darkness inside a building - similar to the eyes of Triops Noctivians, a creature featured in a later story of Weinbaum's, Parasite Planet. The Thoth first visited the planet Earth when mankind was in the Stone Age. They were looked up to as gods by the Ancient Egyptians, to whom they gave the gift of writing.

A strange leathery substance of unknown origin is used by the Thoth to make bags and containers, and also to write on. The Thoth also have a device which the human protagonist notes resembles a continually burning piece of coal. This device is used as an energy and heat source, to make fires, and as a torch in dark areas. The Thoth also use chemicals and steam propulsion in weaponry. Tweel carries a bizarre firearm made from a transparent glass-like material, which fires poisoned splinters.

== Potential sequel ==
Weinbaum had planned at least two sequels to A Martian Odyssey; the first, Valley of Dreams, was published four months later. Weinbaum died of lung cancer before finishing the second.

Questions are put forward in Valley of Dreams, which were most likely to be answered in the third part to the trilogy. For example, why would the Martians (who gain all their nutrients from soil the way plants do) need canals, since they do not drink water directly? It is hinted at (among other things) in Valley of Dreams that the Martians were gathering water for a higher creature that needed it.

Tweel makes a brief appearance in Larry Niven's Rainbow Mars.
