= Eric John Stark =

Fictional character created by Leigh Brackett

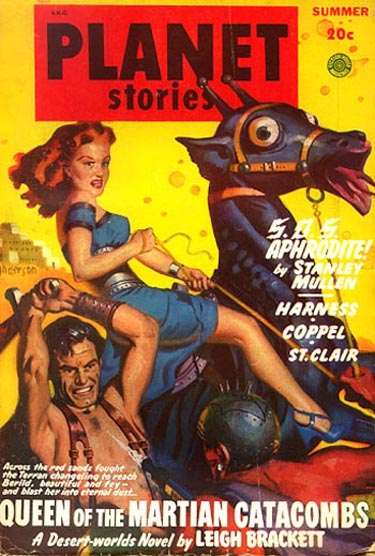
Eric John Stark debuted in "Queen of the Martian Catacombs", the cover story for the Summer 1949 issue of Planet Stories

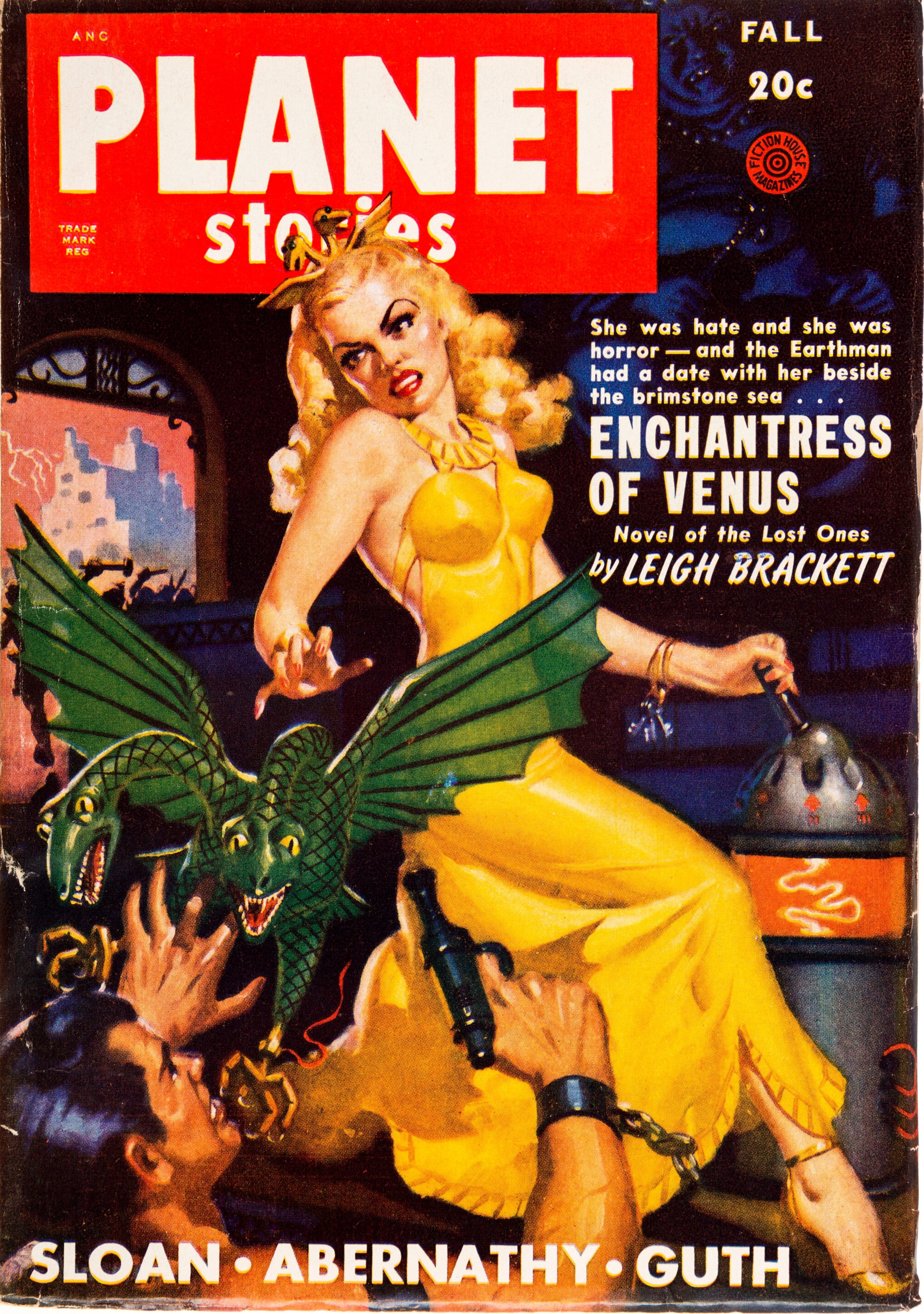
Brackett's second Stark novella, "Enchantress of Venus", took the cover of the next issue of Planet Stories (Fall 1949)

Eric John Stark is a character created by the science fiction author Leigh Brackett. Stark is the hero of a series of pulp adventures set in a time when the Solar System has been colonized. His origin-story shares some characteristics with feral characters such as Mowgli and Tarzan; his adventures take place in the shared space opera planets of 1940s and 1950s science fiction.

== Back-story ==
Stark was born on Mercury. His parents were employees of the mineral extraction company Mercury Metals and Mining. After his parents died in a cave-in caused by a quake, Stark was adopted by a tribe of Mercurian aborigines who are described as hairy and possessing snouts. They gave him the name N'Chaka, meaning "the man without a tribe". He believed himself to be one of them, rather than a human, and endured their rigorous way of life in the Mercurian Twilight Belt, surviving by hunting rock-lizards.

Before Stark was fully grown, another group of human miners exterminated his tribe, captured Stark and imprisoned him in a cage. They would ultimately have killed him if he had not been rescued by the police official Simon Ashton, who raised Stark to adulthood.

The stories of the adult Stark are fast-paced adventures, but Brackett manages to insert more pathos than most authors. Because of his background, Stark is keenly aware of the injustices visited on the planetary "primitives" by the colonialist Earth, and tends to side with them against official bodies. At the opening of the story in which he first appears, Stark is evading a twenty-year sentence placed on him for running guns to a Venusian native group that has been resisting Terran colonizers.

== Appearance ==
Years of exposure to heightened sunlight on the planet Mercury has permanently given Stark very dark, almost black skin. His skin is "almost as dark as his black hair" and an antagonist refers to him scornfully as a "great black ape". The darkness of Stark's skin is reiterated in Enchantress of Venus. Brackett's other Mercurian characters also have black skin (e.g. Jaffa Storm in The Nemesis from Terra).

Brackett's professional illustrators have universally drawn Stark as light-skinned, even sometimes blond. Brackett's use of a strong, independent, and attractive black-skinned character as hero for several of her stories was very unusual for the 1940s and 1950s. The effect of these misleading illustrations has been such that Stark is never remembered or referred to by critics as a black-skinned character, though he is clearly described as such in the stories.

While Stark is described many times as having very dark skin, he appears to be of white European rather than African descent; Brackett repeatedly tells her readers that Stark's unusual coloring is due to prolonged exposure to extreme sunlight while growing up on the planet Mercury. Brackett openly created Stark as a pastiche of Edgar Rice Burroughs' popular John Carter of Mars and Tarzan characters, and Stark's sun-blackened skin is the Mercurian version of Tarzan's sun-bronzed skin.

== Stories ==
=== Solar System ===
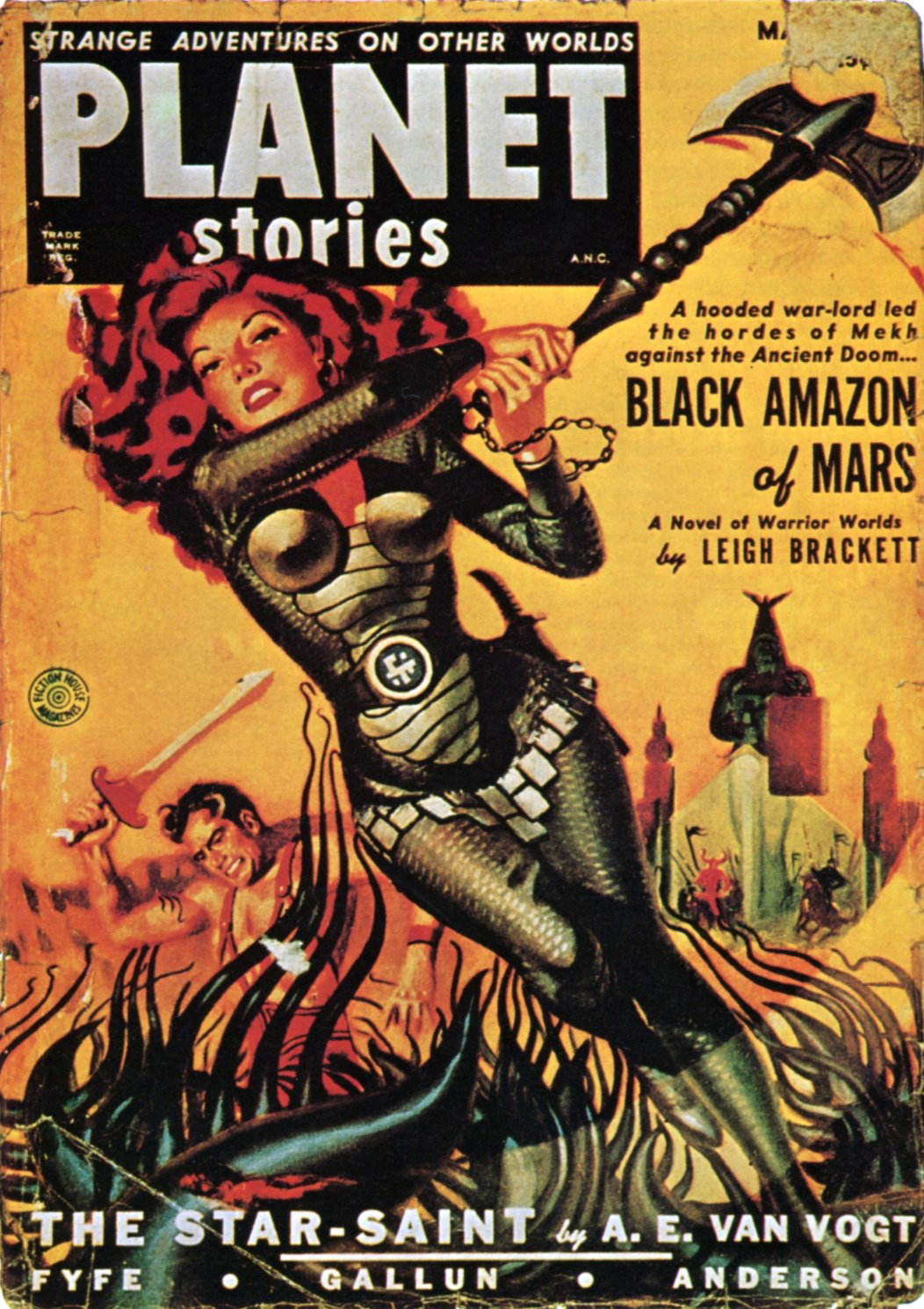
Black Amazon of Mars in Planet Stories, March 1951

Stark first appeared in a group of novellas published in the pulp magazine Planet Stories. These were: "Queen of the Martian Catacombs" (Summer 1949); "Enchantress of Venus" (Fall 1949), once published as "City of the Lost Ones"; and "Black Amazon of Mars" (March 1951). The first and last stories were expanded into short novels: "Queen of the Martian Catacombs" as The Secret of Sinharat and "Black Amazon of Mars" as People of the Talisman. The expanded versions were first published in 1964 as an Ace Double paperback, and again in 1982 under the title Eric John Stark: Outlaw of Mars. The internal chronology of the stories is different from the publishing order; in "Queen of the Martian Catacombs" Stark is on Mars, having fled capture on Venus; "Black Amazon of Mars" takes place soon after, but in an unexplored and barbaric area close to the north pole of Mars; and in "Enchantress of Venus", Stark has returned from Mars to Venus to look for a missing friend.

The two expanded novels have inconsistencies with their novella originals. The Secret of Sinharat is almost identical with "Queen of the Martian Catacombs" up to the point at which Stark arrives at Sinharat, but a crucial plot point is revealed earlier in the novella, and further developments diverge from (while occasionally overlapping) the storyline of "Catacombs". "Black Amazon of Mars" is largely different from People of the Talisman, though founded on a similar premise.

=== Skaith ===
Many years later, Brackett returned to the character in a trilogy of books titled The Ginger Star (1974), The Hounds of Skaith (1974) and The Reavers of Skaith (1976). These stories are science fantasies set on a distant and primitive extrasolar planet, since Stark's original Solar System venue had become unacceptable to publishers. As a result, although the character's personality and origins are retained, there are few other links between the Skaith novels and the earlier Stark novellas.

=== Other ===
A final story, Stark and the Star Kings (2005), places Stark into the world of her husband Edmond Hamilton's Star Kings series.
