= People of the Talisman =

1964 novel by Leigh Brackett

- Cover of first edition.
- Author: Leigh Brackett
- Language: English
- Genre: Science fantasy
- Publisher: Ace Books
- Publication date: 1964
- Publication place: United States
- Media type: Print (Paperback)
- Pages: 128
- Preceded by: The Secret of Sinharat

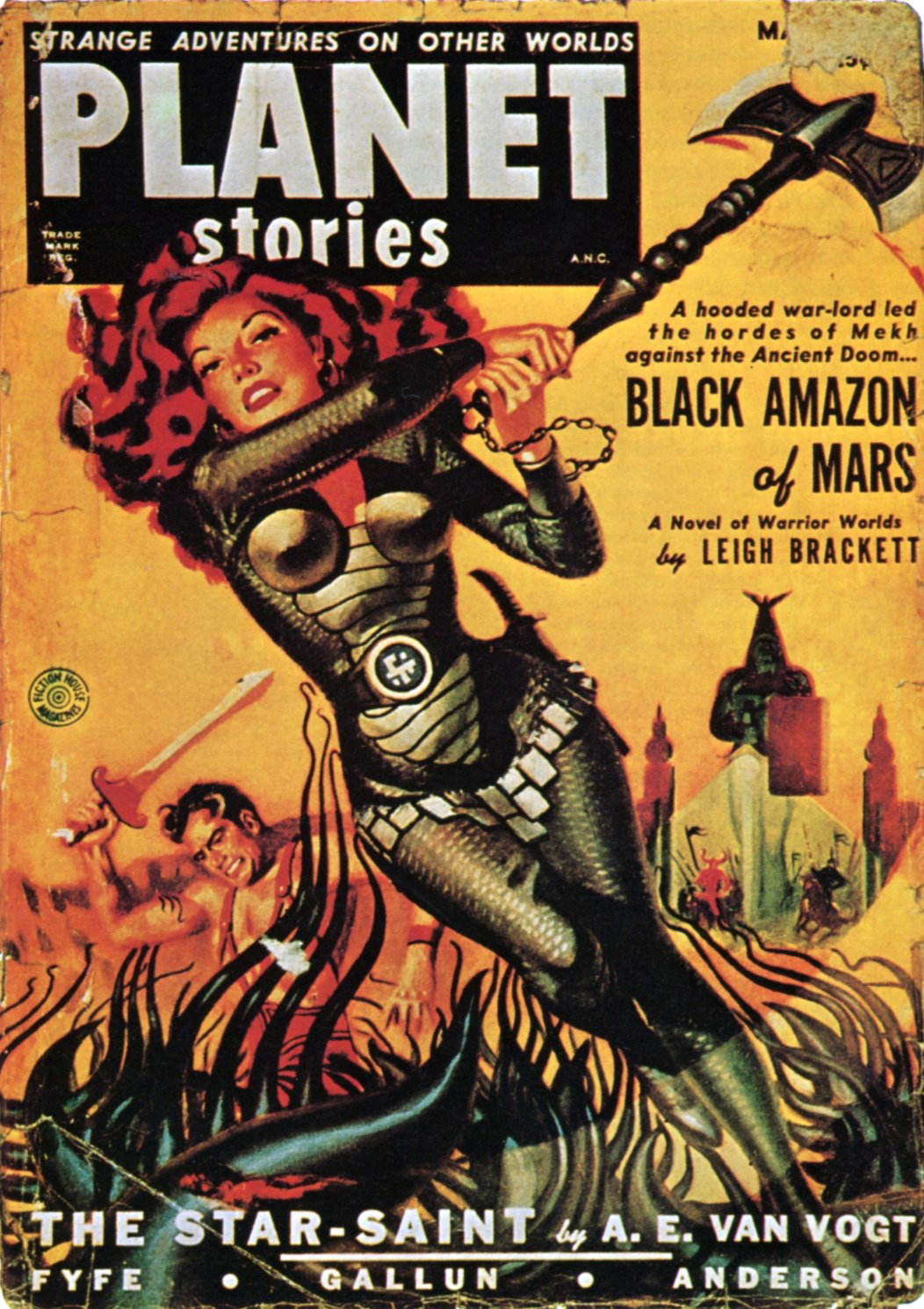
"Black Amazon of Mars" in Planet Stories, March 1951.

People of the Talisman is a science fantasy novel by American writer Leigh Brackett, set on the planet Mars, whose protagonist is Eric John Stark.

This story was first published under the title Black Amazon of Mars in the pulp magazine Planet Stories, March 1951.

In 1964, after a total revision and expansion, it was republished as People of the Talisman, as one part of an Ace Double novel; its companion was another expanded Eric John Stark story, The Secret of Sinharat. The expansion has sometimes been attributed to Brackett's husband, Edmond Hamilton. For People of the Talisman, there may be some internal evidence to support this suggestion.

In 1982, it appeared, again together with The Secret of Sinharat, under the title Eric John Stark, Outlaw of Mars.

In 2005 the original Planet Stories version was republished in Sea-Kings of Mars and Otherworldly Stories, Volume 46 in the Gollancz Fantasy Masterworks series. It appeared the same year in the collection Stark and the Star Kings (Haffner Press).

== Sources ==
- Tuck, Donald H. (1974). The Encyclopedia of Science Fiction and Fantasy. Chicago: Advent. p. 61. ISBN 0-911682-20-1.
