= Shadow Over Mars =

1951 novel by Leigh Brackett

- First book publication
- Author: Leigh Brackett
- Language: English
- Genre: Science fiction
- Publication date: March 1951 (first book publication)
- Publication place: United States
- Media type: Print (Paperback)
- Pages: 128

Shadow Over Mars is the debut science fiction novel by American writer Leigh Brackett, published in 1944.

== Publication ==
The novel was first published in the Fall 1944 issue of Startling Stories. Its first book publication came in 1961 with a paperback edition distributed by Sydney Pemberton but it is more widely known for its appearance as Ace Double F-123 with Robert Silverberg's Collision Course. This edition was retitled The Nemesis from Terra.

== Summary ==
The novel is set on Mars, where tension is building between rebellious Martians and humans in the thrall of the Company. At the beginning of the novel, the protagonist Rick Urquhart is attempting to evade the Company when he encounters a Martian, who makes a prophecy that he will ultimately rule the planet. He is forced to kill her in self-defense but the company soon catches up with him and sends him back to labor in the mines.

However, he is able to escape and meets Martian-rights activist Mayo McCall. He is captured by the Martians and made to atone for his murder but after a failed rebellion, Rick becomes their greatest hope for success and the stakes are raised when Company operative Jaffa Storm kidnaps Mayo. In order to discover his fate and rescue Mayo, Rick sets out to the Martian North Pole, home of the mysterious "Thinkers".

== Reception ==
In 2012, Rich Horton gave a mostly positive review to the Ace Double edition, describing it as "decent work, early Brackett in more of a tough and cynical mode than the poetic mode she later found." He found the politics of the Martian rebellion particularly interesting but commented that it didn't fit well with Brackett's other Mars stories.

In 2020, Shadow Over Mars was awarded the 1945 Retro-Hugo Award for Best Novel.
