= Stanley Bennett Hough =

Stanley Bennett Hough (25 February 1917 – February 1998) was a British author of science fiction, for which he used the pseudonym Rex Gordon. He also published several novels under his own name.

Hough was a wireless operator on merchant and passenger ships. In World War II his ship was sunk near Algiers.

Hough's works as Rex Gordon covered space travel, time travel, alien encounters and planetary colonization. His other novels concerned nuclear warfare, neo-Nazis, crime and political crisis.

Hough was born in Preston, Lancashire and died in Falmouth, Cornwall.

== Bibliography ==
=== As Rex Gordon ===
- Utopia 239 (1955)
- No Man Friday (1956)

also published as First on Mars

- First to the Stars (1959)

also published as The Worlds of Eclos

- First Through Time (1962)

also published as The Time Factor

- Utopia Minus X (1966)

also published as The Paw of God

- The Yellow Fraction (1969)

=== As S. B. Hough ===
- Frontier Incident (1951)
- Moment of Decision (1952)
- Mission in Guemo (1953)
- The Seas South (1953)
- The Primitives (1954)
- Extinction Bomber (1956)
- A Pound a Day Inclusive (1957)
- The Bronze Perseus (1959)

also published as The Tender Killer

- Expedition Everyman (1959)
- Beyond the Eleventh Hour (1961)
- Expedition Everyman 1964 (1964)
- Where? An Independent Report on Holiday Resorts in Britain and the Continent (1964)
- Dear Daughter Dead (1965)
- Sweet Sister Seduced (1968)
- Fear Fortune, Father (1974)
- Creative Writing, a Handbook for Students, Tutors and Educational Authorities (published by WEA South West District) (not dated)

=== As Bennett Stanley ===
- Sea Struck (1953)
- The Alscott Experiment (1954)
- Sea to Eden (1954)
- Government Contract (1956)
