= No Man Friday =

1956 novel by Rex Gordon

- First edition cover
- Author: Rex Gordon
- Cover artist: Bruce Roberts
- Language: English
- Genre: Science fiction
- Published: 1956
- Publisher: Heinemann
- Publication place: United Kingdom
- Media type: print (hardback)
- Pages: 201

No Man Friday (also known in the United States as First on Mars) is a British science fiction novel by Rex Gordon (Stanley Bennett Hough) published in 1956. The reference in the original title is to Robinson Crusoe, and the story can be described as a science fiction robinsonade set on Mars. The similarity is made explicit by the first edition cover.

== Plot summary ==
A British rocket, developed at minimal cost and kept secret from officialdom, lifts off from the Woomera rocket range on a mission to Mars. During the voyage, an accident in the airlock kills the entire crew except for engineer Gordon Holder, the novel's narrator, who was returning from an EVA and still in his space suit.

The rocket reaches Mars but crash-lands. There, Holder learns how to produce oxygen and water, also discovering more about Martian species and nourishment. Eventually, he starts cooperating with the titanic inhabitants of the planet to survive. After fifteen years, an American mission lands, thinking themselves the first to reach Mars. Holder contacts the Americans, and then tries to return to the dominant Martian beings, but is prevented from reaching them. He returns to Earth with the Americans.

== Martian creatures ==
In his book, Rex Gordon describes Mars as a planet inhabited by different kinds of life forms.

Minerals
Highly energetic flower-shaped mineral formations that grow in Martian valleys. Humidity disintegrates them.
Plants
Photosynthetic organisms growing throughout the Martian surface. They bloom and produce hard fruits.
"Ants"
Social insect-like bugs that pollinate the plants' flowers.
"Humans"
Humanoid creatures are not the dominant species on Mars. These animals eat the plants' fruits, live in groups and have limited intelligence.
Dominant beings
Gigantic nocturnal living beings that eat Martian humanoids. They use their body lights for communication. The book also suggests they have the capacity to distort spacetime.
