= Leigh Brackett =

American novelist and screenwriter (1915–1978)

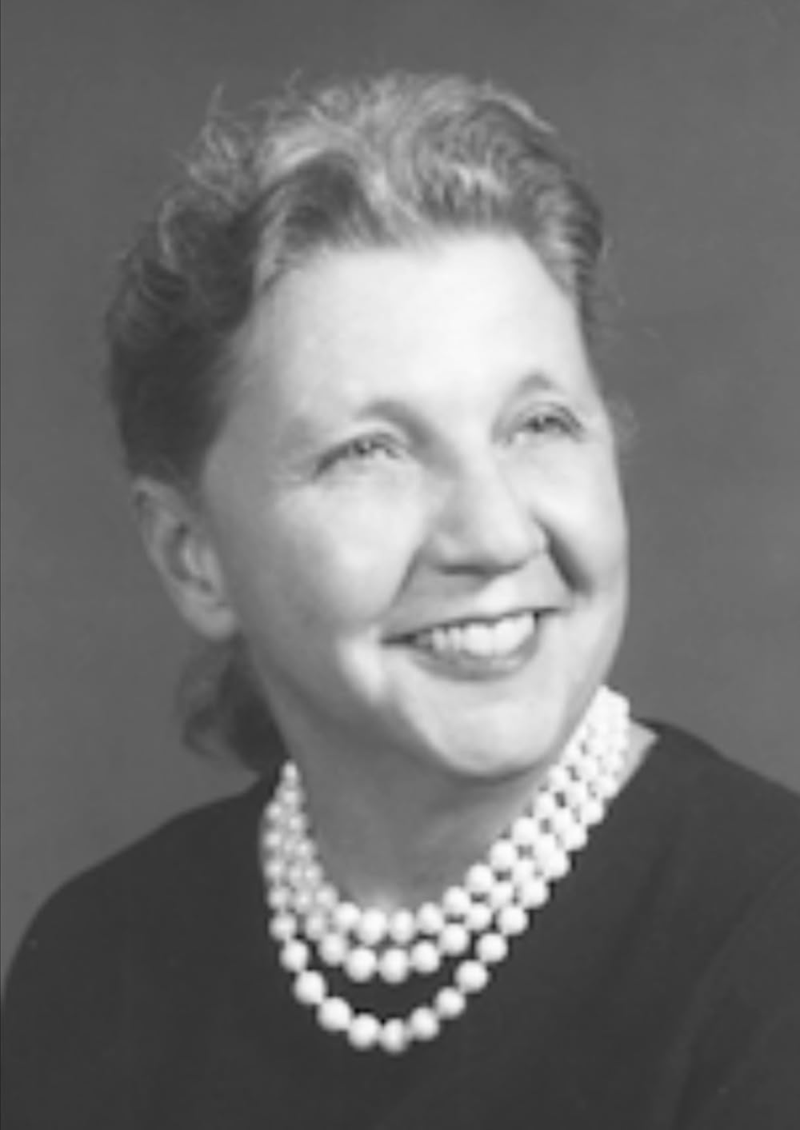
- Brackett c. 1973
- Born: Leigh Douglass Brackett; December 7, 1915; Los Angeles, California, US
- Died: March 18, 1978 (aged 62); Lancaster, California, US
- Occupations: Novelist, screenwriter
- Spouse: Edmond Hamilton (m. 1946; died 1977)
- Writing career
- Genres: Science fiction, crime fiction
- Notable work: Eric John Stark series

Leigh Douglass Brackett (December 7, 1915 – March 18, 1978) was an American author and screenwriter. Nicknamed "the Queen of Space Opera", she was one of the most prominent female writers during the Golden Age of Science Fiction. As a screenwriter, she was best known for her collaborations with director Howard Hawks, mainly writing Westerns and crime films. She also worked on an early draft of The Empire Strikes Back (1980), elements of which remained in the film; she died before it went into production.

In 1956, her book The Long Tomorrow made her the first woman ever shortlisted for the Hugo Award for Best Novel, and, along with C. L. Moore, one of the first two women ever nominated for a Hugo Award. In 2020, she posthumously won a Retro Hugo for her novel The Nemesis From Terra, originally published as Shadow Over Mars (Startling Stories, Fall 1944).

== Early life and education ==
Leigh Brackett was born and raised in Los Angeles, California. Her father died in 1918, a victim of the global influenza pandemic and her mother did not remarry. Leigh was a tomboy, "tall" and "athletic". She attended a private girls' school in Santa Monica, California, where she was involved in theater and began writing.

== Career ==
=== Fiction writer ===
Brackett first published in her mid-20s; the science fiction story "Martian Quest" appeared in the February 1940 issue of Astounding Science Fiction. Her earliest years as a writer (1940–1942) were her most productive. Some of her stories have social themes, such as "The Citadel of Lost Ships" (1943), which considers the effects on alien cultures of Earth's expanding trade empire. At the time, she was an active member of the Los Angeles Science Fantasy Society (LASFS), and participated in local science fiction fandom by contributing to the second issue of Pogo's STF-ETTE, an all-female science fiction fanzine (probably the first such).

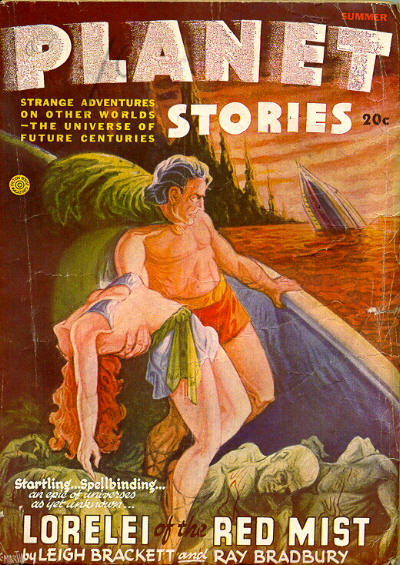
The Brackett-Bradbury collaboration "Lorelei of the Red Mist" took the cover of Planet Stories in 1946.

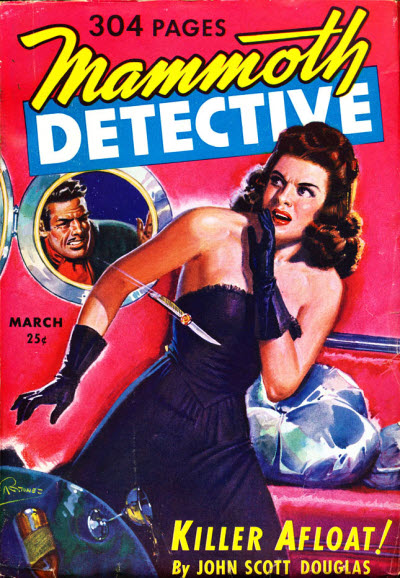
Brackett's first detective story, "Murder in the Family", was published in Mammoth Detective in 1943.

Brackett's first novel, No Good from a Corpse (1944), was a hard-boiled mystery novel in the tradition of Raymond Chandler. The book led to her first big screenwriting assignment. After this, Brackett's science fiction stories became more ambitious. Shadow Over Mars (1944) was her first novel-length story; though rough-edged, it marked the beginning of a new style influenced by the characterization of the 1940s detective story and film noir. It won a Retro Hugo for best novel in 2020.

Planet Stories published the novella "Lorelei of the Red Mist", in which the protagonist is a thief named Hugh Starke. Brackett finished the first half before turning it over to her close friend Ray Bradbury, so that she could leave to work on the screenplay of The Big Sleep.

Brackett returned to science fiction writing in 1948 after her movie work. Between 1948 and 1951, she produced a series of science fiction adventure stories that were longer than her previous work, including classic representations of her planetary settings as "The Moon that Vanished" and the novel Sea-Kings of Mars (1949). The latter was later published as The Sword of Rhiannon.

In "Queen of the Martian Catacombs" (1949), Brackett created the character of Eric John Stark. Stark, an orphan from Earth, is raised by the semi-sentient aboriginals of Mercury, who are later killed by Earthmen. He is saved by a Terran official, who adopts and mentors Stark. When threatened, Stark reverts to the primitive N'Chaka, the "man without a tribe", who he was on Mercury. From 1949 to 1951, Brackett featured Stark (whose name echoes that of the hero in "Lorelei of the Red Mist") in three stories published in Planet Stories: "Queen of the Martian Catacombs", "Enchantress of Venus", and "Black Amazon of Mars". With this last story, Brackett's high adventure period ended.

Brackett adopted an elegiac tone in her stories, no longer celebrating the conflicts of frontier worlds but lamenting the passing of civilizations, and concentrating more on mood than plot. The stories' reflective, introspective nature is indicated in the titles: "The Last Days of Shandakor", "Shannach—the Last", and "Last Call from Sector 9G".

"Last Call" was published in the final issue (Summer 1955) of Planet Stories, which had been her most reliable publisher. After Planet Stories folded, and then Startling Stories and Thrilling Wonder Stories, Brackett lost her magazine market. The first phase of her career as a science fiction author ended. She produced other stories over the next decade, and revised and published some as novels. A new production of this period was The Long Tomorrow (1955), one of Brackett's more critically acclaimed novels. It describes an agrarian, technophobic society that develops after a nuclear war.

After 1955, Brackett concentrated on writing for the more lucrative film and television markets. In 1963 and 1964, she briefly returned to her old Martian milieu with a pair of stories. "The Road to Sinharat" was an affectionate farewell to the world of "Queen of the Martian Catacombs", and the other, with the intentionally ridiculous title of "Purple Priestess of the Mad Moon", borders on parody.

Brackett and her husband shared Guest of Honor duties at the 22nd World Science Fiction Convention, Pacificon II, in 1964 in Oakland, California.

After another decade-long hiatus, Brackett returned to science fiction in the 1970s with the publication of The Ginger Star (1974), The Hounds of Skaith (1974), and The Reavers of Skaith (1976), collected as The Book of Skaith in 1976. This trilogy brought Eric John Stark back for adventures on the extra-solar planet of Skaith (rather than his old haunts, Mars and Venus).

==== Brackett's Solar System ====
Often called the "Queen of Space Opera", Brackett also wrote planetary romance. Almost all her planetary romances take place in the Solar System, which contains richly detailed fictional versions of the consensus Mars and Venus of science fiction from the 1930s to the 1950s. Mars appears as a marginally habitable desert world, populated by ancient, decadent and mostly humanoid races, and Venus as a primitive, wet jungle planet, occupied by vigorous, primitive tribes and reptilian monsters. Brackett's Skaith combines elements of her other worlds with fantasy elements.

Though Edgar Rice Burroughs' influence is apparent in Brackett's Mars stories, her Mars is set firmly in a world of interplanetary commerce and competition. A prominent theme of her stories is the clash of planetary civilizations; they illustrate and criticize the effects of colonialism on civilizations that are either older or younger than those of the colonizers. Burroughs' heroes set out to remake entire worlds according to their own codes; Brackett's heroes (often antiheroes) are at the mercy of trends and movements far bigger than they are.

After the Mariner missions indicated there was no life on Mars, Brackett never returned to her Solar System. When she started to write planetary romance again in the 1970s, she invented a new Solar System outside our own.

=== Screenwriter ===
Shortly after Brackett broke into science fiction writing, she wrote her first screenplays. Hollywood director Howard Hawks was so impressed by her novel No Good from a Corpse that he had his secretary call in "this guy Brackett" to help William Faulkner write the script for The Big Sleep (1946). The film was written by Brackett, Faulkner, and Jules Furthman, and starred Humphrey Bogart.

After getting married, Brackett took a break from screenwriting. When she returned to screenwriting in the mid-1950s, she wrote for TV and movies. Howard Hawks hired her to write or co-write several John Wayne pictures, including Rio Bravo (1959), Hatari! (1962), El Dorado (1966), and Rio Lobo (1970). Because of her background with The Big Sleep, she later adapted Raymond Chandler's novel The Long Goodbye for the screen.

==== The Empire Strikes Back ====
Brackett worked on the screenplay for The Empire Strikes Back, the first Star Wars sequel. The film won the Hugo Award in 1981. This script was a departure for Brackett; until then, all her science fiction had been in the form of novels and short stories. George Lucas said that he asked Brackett to write the screenplay based on his story outline. Brackett wrote a finished first draft, titled "Star Wars sequel", that was delivered to Lucas shortly before her death from cancer on March 18, 1978, but her version was rejected and Lucas wrote two drafts of a new screenplay and, following the delivery of the screenplay for Raiders of the Lost Ark, turned them over to Lawrence Kasdan to rework some dialogue, before Lucas was able to talk about changes to the script he wanted her to make. Brackett and Kasdan (but not Lucas) were credited for the final screenplay. Brackett was credited in tribute despite not being involved in the final film.

Laurent Bouzereau, in Star Wars: The Annotated Screenplays, said that Lucas disliked the direction of Brackett's screenplay, discarded it, and produced two more screenplays before turning the results over to Kasdan. io9's co-founder Charlie Jane Anders has written that while "It's fashionable to disparage Brackett's contributions to Empire", "it's not true that none of Brackett's storyline winds up in the final movie—the basic story beats are the same."

For over 30 years, Brackett's screenplay could be read only at the Jack Williamson Special Collections library at Eastern New Mexico University in Portales, New Mexico, and at Lucasfilm's archives in California. It was officially published in February 2016. In this draft, there is a love triangle between Luke, Leia and Han Solo. Yoda is named Minch, Luke has a hidden sister named Nellith, Lando Calrissian is Lando Kaddar, Luke's father is still a distinct character from Darth Vader and appears as a Force ghost on Dagobah, and Han Solo, at the end of the script, leaves to search for his uncle Ovan Marek, the most powerful man in the universe after the Emperor Palpatine.

John Saavedra of Den of Geek website wrote:

Most importantly, you see that Brackett's draft, while definitely in need of a rewrite and several tweaks, holds all of the big moments we'd eventually see on screen. We still get a version of the Battle of Hoth, the wise words of an old Jedi Master, the excitement of zooming through a deadly asteroid field, a love triangle, a majestic city in the clouds, unexpected betrayals, and the climactic duel between Luke Skywalker and Darth Vader.

== Personal life and death ==
On December 31, 1946, at age 31, Brackett married another science fiction writer, Edmond Hamilton, in San Gabriel, California. Fellow LASFS member Ray Bradbury served as best man. Bradbury and Robert Heinlein were longtime close friends of Brackett's. She moved with Hamilton to Kinsman, Ohio.

Edmond Hamilton died in February 1977 in Lancaster, California, of complications following kidney surgery, at age 72. Brackett died there in March 1978, of cancer, at age 62.

== Bibliography ==
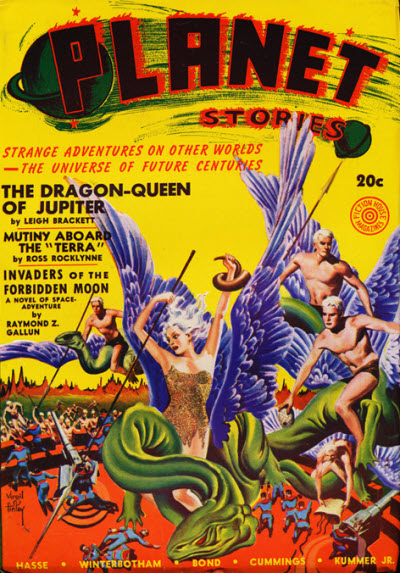
Brackett's "The Dragon-Queen of Jupiter" was the cover story in the Summer 1941 issue of Planet Stories.

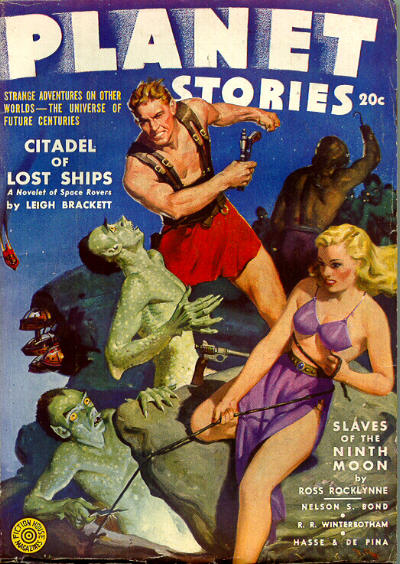
Brackett's novelette "Citadel of Lost Ships" was the cover story in the March 1943 issue of Planet Stories.

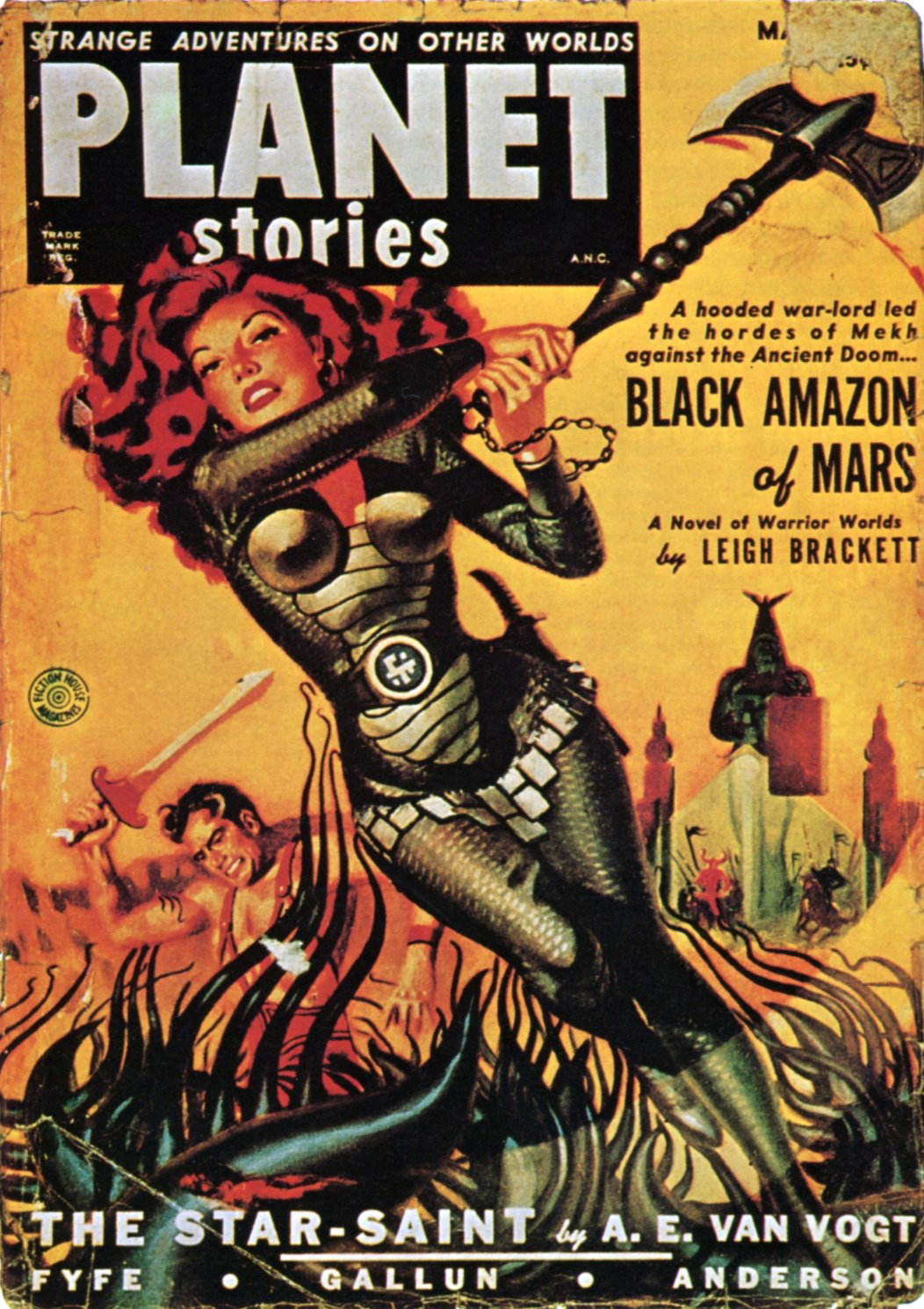
Brackett's novella "Black Amazon of Mars" was the cover story in the March 1951 issue of Planet Stories.

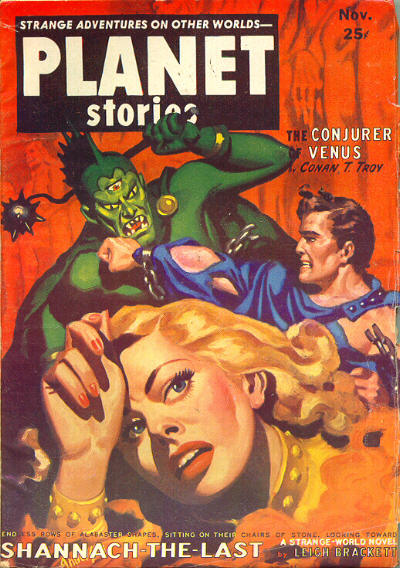
Brackett's novella "Shannach - The Last" took the cover of the December 1952 issue of Planet Stories.

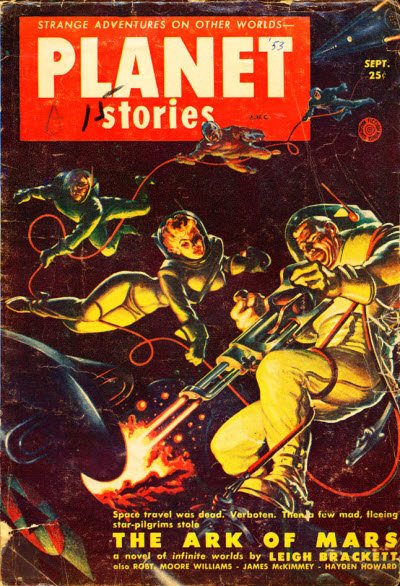
Brackett's novella "The Ark of Mars" was the cover story in the September 1953 issue of Planet Stories, illustrated by Kelly Freas.

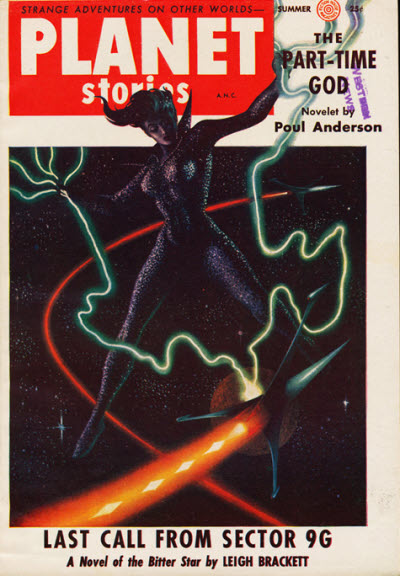
Brackett's novella "Last Call from Sector 9G" was the cover story in the final issue of Planet Stories in 1955, illustrated by Kelly Freas.

=== Short science fiction ===
==== 1940–1941 ====
- "Martian Quest" (Astounding Science Fiction, February 1940)
- "The Treasure of Ptakuth" (Astounding Science Fiction, April 1940)
- "The Stellar Legion" (Planet Stories, Winter 1940)
- "The Tapestry Gate" (Strange Stories, August 1940)
- "The Demons of Darkside" (Startling Stories, January 1941)
- "Water Pirate" (Super Science Stories, January 1941)
- "Interplanetary Reporter" (Startling Stories, May 1941)
- "The Dragon-Queen of Jupiter" (Planet Stories, Summer 1941), also published as "The Dragon-Queen of Venus"
- "Lord of the Earthquake" (novelette; Science Fiction, June 1941)
- "No Man's Land in Space" (novelette; Amazing Stories July 1941)
- "A World Is Born" (Comet Stories July 1941)
- "Retreat to the Stars" (Astonishing Stories, November 1941)

==== 1942–1944 ====
- "Child of the Green Light" (Super Science Stories, February 1942)
- "The Sorcerer of Rhiannon" (novelette; Astounding Science Fiction, February 1942)
- "Child of the Sun" (novelette; Planet Stories, Spring 1942)
- "Out of the Sea" (novelette; Astonishing Stories, June 1942)
- "Cube from Space" (Super Science Stories, August 1942)
- "Outpost on Io" (Planet Stories, Winter 1942)
- "The Halfling" (novelette; Astonishing Stories, February 1943)
- "The Citadel of Lost Ships" (Planet Stories, March 1943)
- "The Blue Behemoth" (Planet Stories, May 1943)
- "Thralls of the Endless Night" (Planet Stories, Fall 1943)
- "The Jewel of Bas" (novelette; Planet Stories, Spring 1944)
- "The Veil of Astellar" (novelette; Thrilling Wonder Stories, Spring 1944)
- "Terror Out of Space" (Planet Stories, Summer 1944)
- "Shadow Over Mars" (Startling Stories, Fall 1944), published in book form as The Nemesis from Terra, winner of a best novel Retro Hugo in 2020.

==== 1945–1950 ====
- "The Vanishing Venusians" (novelette; Planet Stories, Spring 1945)
- "Lorelei of the Red Mist", with Ray Bradbury (novella; Planet Stories, Summer 1946)
- "The Moon That Vanished" (novelette; Thrilling Wonder Stories, October 1948)
- "The Beast-Jewel of Mars" (novelette; Planet Stories, Winter 1948)
- "Quest of the Starhope" (Thrilling Wonder Stories, April 1949)
- "Sea-Kings of Mars" (Thrilling Wonder Stories, June 1949), published in book form as The Sword of Rhiannon
- "Queen of the Martian Catacombs" (Planet Stories, Summer 1949), expanded and published in book form as The Secret of Sinharat
- "Enchantress of Venus" (novella; Planet Stories, Fall 1949), also published as "City of the Lost Ones"
- "The Lake of the Gone Forever" (novelette; Thrilling Wonder Stories, October 1949)
- "The Dancing Girl of Ganymede" (novelette; Thrilling Wonder Stories, February 1950)
- "The Truants" (novelette; Startling Stories, July 1950)
- "The Citadel of Lost Ages" (novella; Thrilling Wonder Stories, December 1950)

==== 1951–1955 ====
- "Black Amazon of Mars" (Planet Stories, March 1951), expanded and published in book form as People of the Talisman
- "The Starmen of Llyrdis" (Startling Stories, March 1951)
- "The Woman from Altair" (novelette; Startling Stories, July 1951)
- "The Shadows" (Startling Stories, February 1952)
- "The Last Days of Shandakor" (novelette; Startling Stories, April 1952)
- "Shannach – The Last" (novelette; Planet Stories, November 1952)
- "The Ark of Mars" (Planet Stories, September 1953), later published as part of the book Alpha Centauri or Die!
- "Mars Minus Bisha" (Planet Stories, January 1954)
- "Runaway" (Startling Stories, Spring 1954)
- "Teleportress of Alpha C" (Planet Stories, Winter 1954/1955), later published as part of the book Alpha Centauri or Die!
- "The Tweener" (The Magazine of Fantasy and Science Fiction, February 1955)
- "Last Call from Sector 9G" (Planet Stories, Summer 1955)

==== After 1955 ====
- "The Other People" (novelette; Venture Science Fiction Magazine March 1957), also published as "The Queer Ones"
- "All the Colors of the Rainbow" (novelette; Venture Science Fiction Magazine, November 1957)
- "The Road to Sinharat" (novelette; Amazing Stories, May 1963)
- "Purple Priestess of the Mad Moon" (The Magazine of Fantasy and Science Fiction, October 1964)
- "Come Sing the Moons of Moravenn" (The Other Side of Tomorrow, 1973)
- "How Bright the Stars" (Flame Tree Planet: An Anthology of Religious Science-Fantasy, 1973)
- "Mommies and Daddies" (Crisis, 1974)
- "Stark and the Star Kings", with Edmond Hamilton (in the collection of the same name, 2005)

=== Science fiction novels ===
- Shadow Over Mars (1951) – first published 1944; published in the U.S. as The Nemesis from Terra (1961)
- The Starmen (1952) – also published as The Galactic Breed (1955, abridged), The Starmen of Llyrdis (1976)
- The Sword of Rhiannon (1953) – first published as Sea-Kings of Mars (1949)
- The Big Jump (1955)
- The Long Tomorrow (1955)
- Alpha Centauri or Die! (1963) – fixup of The Ark of Mars (1953) and Teleportress of Alpha C (1954)
- The Secret of Sinharat and People of the Talisman (1964)
- The Ginger Star (1974) – first published as a two-part serial in Worlds of If, February and April 1974
- The Hounds of Skaith (1974)
- The Reavers of Skaith (1976)

=== Science fiction collections ===
- The Coming of the Terrans (1967)
- The Halfling and Other Stories (1973)
- The Book of Skaith (1976) – omnibus edition of the three Skaith novels
- The Best of Leigh Brackett (1977), ed. Edmond Hamilton
- Martian Quest: The Early Brackett (2000) – Haffner Press
- Stark and the Star Kings (2005), with Edmond Hamilton
- Sea-Kings of Mars and Otherworldly Stories (2005) – #46 in the Fantasy Masterworks series
- Lorelei of the Red Mist: Planetary Romances (2007) – Haffner Press
- Shannach–the Last: Farewell to Mars (2011) – Haffner Press

=== Science fiction, as editor ===
- The Best of Planet Stories No. 1 (anthology; 1975)
- The Best of Edmond Hamilton (collection; 1977)

=== Screenplays ===
- The Vampire's Ghost (with John K. Butler), 1945
- Crime Doctor's Manhunt (with Eric Taylor), 1946
- The Big Sleep (with William Faulkner and Jules Furthman), 1946
- Rio Bravo (with Jules Furthman and B.H. McCampbell), 1959
- Gold of the Seven Saints (with Leonard Freeman), 1961
- Hatari! (with Harry Kurnitz), 1962
- Man's Favorite Sport? (uncredited), 1964
- El Dorado, 1966
- Rio Lobo (with Burton Wohl), 1970
- The Long Goodbye, 1973
- The Empire Strikes Back (with George Lucas and Lawrence Kasdan), 1980

=== Other genres ===
- No Good from a Corpse (crime novel; 1944)
- "I Feel Bad Killing You" (noir short story) - New Detective Magazine, November 1944
- Stranger at Home (crime novel; 1946) – ghost-writer for the actor George Sanders
- An Eye for an Eye (crime novel; 1957) – adapted for television as Suspicion series episode (1958)
- The Tiger Among Us (crime novel; 1957; UK 1960 as Fear No Evil), filmed as 13 West Street (1962; dir. Philip Leacock)
- Follow the Free Wind (western novel; 1963) – received the Spur Award from Western Writers of America
- Rio Bravo (western novel; 1959) – novelization based on the screenplay by Jules Furthman and Leigh Brackett
- Silent Partner (crime novel; 1969)
- No Good from a Corpse (mystery collection; Dennis McMillan Publications, 1999) – reprints the titular novel featuring PI Ed Clive, and eight shorter crime stories

== See also ==
- Eric John Stark
- Golden Age of Science Fiction
