= The Best of Cordwainer Smith =

1975 collection of short stories by Cordwainer Smith

- Cover of first edition
- Author: Cordwainer Smith
- Cover artist: Janice C. Tate
- Language: English
- Series: Ballantine's Classic Library of Science Fiction
- Genre: Science fiction
- Publisher: Doubleday
- Publication date: 1975
- Publication place: United States
- Media type: Print (hardcover)
- Pages: 342
- OCLC: 1494561
- Preceded by: The Best of Frederik Pohl
- Followed by: The Best of C. L. Moore

The Best of Cordwainer Smith is a collection of science fiction short stories by American author Cordwainer Smith, edited by J. J. Pierce. It was first published in hardback by Nelson Doubleday in July 1975 and in paperback by Ballantine Books in September of the same year as a volume in its Classic Library of Science Fiction. The Ballantine edition was reprinted in October 1977 and July 1985. Phoenix Pick issued a new edition in trade paperback and ebook in April, 2017. A British paperback edition under the alternative title The Rediscovery of Man was published by Gollancz in June 1988, and reissued in 1999, 2003, and 2010; Gollancz also brought out hardcover and ebook versions in September 1988 and November 2012, respectively. The book has also been translated into German.

== Summary ==
The book contains twelve short works of fiction by the author, all set in his "Instrumentality of Mankind" future history series, together with an introduction and timeline by editor J. J. Pierce. All versions of the collection following the first feature a corrected version of the timeline, retitled "TImeline from The Instrumentality of Mankind."

== Contents ==
- "Cordwainer Smith: The Shaper of Myths" [introduction] (J. J. Pierce)
- "The Instrumentality of Mankind" [timeline] (J. J. Pierce)
- "Scanners Live in Vain" (from Fantasy Book, January 1950)
- "The Lady Who Sailed The Soul" (with Genevieve Linebarger; from Galaxy, April 1960)
- "The Game of Rat and Dragon" (from Galaxy, October 1955)
- "The Burning of the Brain" (from If, October 1958)
- "Golden the Ship Was — Oh! Oh! Oh!" (with Genevieve Linebarger) (from Amazing Stories, April 1959)
- "The Crime and the Glory of Commander Suzdal" (from Amazing Stories, May 1964)
- "The Dead Lady of Clown Town" (from Galaxy, August 1964)
- "Under Old Earth" (from Galaxy, February 1966)
- "Mother Hitton's Littul Kittons" (from Galaxy, June 1961)
- "Alpha Ralpha Boulevard" (from The Magazine of Fantasy & Science Fiction, June 1961)
- "The Ballad of Lost C'Mell" (from Galaxy, October 1962)
- "A Planet Named Shayol" (from Galaxy, October 1961)

== Awards ==
The book placed second in the 1976 Locus Poll Award for Best Single Author Collection. "Scanners Live in Vain" was nominated for the 1951 Retro Hugo Award for Best Novelette in 2001. "The Game of Rat and Dragon" was nominated for the 1956 Hugo Award for Best Short Story. "Alpha Ralpha Boulevard" was nominated for the 1962 Hugo Award for Best Short Fiction. "The Ballad of Lost C'Mell" was nominated for the 1964 Hugo Award for Best Short Fiction. "A Planet Named Shayol" won the 1995 Seiun Award for Best Translated Short Story.

== Audio edition ==
An unabridged audio edition of the book, narrated by Sean Runnette, was published by Blackstone Audio in 2016.
