= The Rediscovery of Man =

1993 Cordwainer Smith compilation book

- The cover of the first edition. Cover art by Jack Gaughan, originally painted for Smith's 1965 collection Space Lords.
- Author: Cordwainer Smith
- Language: English
- Genre: Science fiction
- Publisher: NESFA Press
- Publication date: 1993
- Publication place: United States
- ISBN: 0-915368-56-0

The Rediscovery of Man: The Complete Short Science Fiction of Cordwainer Smith (ISBN 0-915368-56-0) is a 1993 book containing the complete collected short fiction of American science fiction author Cordwainer Smith. It was edited by James A. Mann and published by NESFA Press.

Most of the stories take place in Smith's future history set in the universe of the Instrumentality of Mankind; the collection is arranged in the chronological order in which the stories take place in the fictional timeline. The collection also contains short stories which do not take place in this universe.

Within the context of the future history, the Rediscovery of Mankind refers to the Instrumentality's re-introduction of chance and unhappiness into the sterile utopia that they had created for humanity. Other than Smith's novel, Norstrilia, which takes place in the same future history, the book collects all of Smith's known science fiction writing.

== List of Instrumentality of Man stories ==
- "No, No, Not Rogov!"
- "War No. 81-Q" (version 2) (not previously collected)*
- "Mark Elf"
- "The Queen of the Afternoon"*
- "Scanners Live in Vain"
- "The Lady Who Sailed The Soul"
- "When the People Fell"
- "Think Blue, Count Two"
- "The Colonel Came Back from the Nothing-at-All"*
- "The Game of Rat and Dragon"
- "The Burning of the Brain"
- "From Gustible's Planet"
- "Himself in Anachron" (first publication)*
- "The Crime and the Glory of Commander Suzdal"
- "Golden the Ship Was-Oh! Oh! Oh!"
- "The Dead Lady of Clown Town"
- "Under Old Earth"
- "Drunkboat" (much rewritten version of "The Colonel Came Back from the Nothing-at-All")
- "Mother Hitton's Littul Kittons"
- "Alpha Ralpha Boulevard"
- "The Ballad of Lost C'Mell"
- "A Planet Named Shayol"
- The "Casher O'Neill" stories, and one related story, collected in novel form as Quest of the Three Worlds:
  - "On the Gem Planet"
  - "On the Storm Planet"
  - "On the Sand Planet"
  - "Three to a Given Star"
- "Down to a Sunless Sea"*

"Scanners Live in Vain" is preceded by a facsimile of Smith's (real name Paul Linebarger) original cover letter (dated March 9, 1948) in which, en passant, he mentions being a fan of A. E. van Vogt.

According to the book's introduction "Scanners Live in Vain" is printed, for the first time, from the original manuscript, restoring its chapterization and some text omitted from the magazine version. The other stories are taken from their anthology versions rather than the original magazine texts.

"The Queen of the Afternoon" is a posthumous sequel to "Mark Elf".

Stories marked with an asterisk were published posthumously. Some, if not all, were completed by Smith's widow Genevieve Linebarger from his unfinished manuscripts.

The stories are collected in more or less chronological order, according to J. J. Pierce's admittedly speculative timeline of the Instrumentality. The timeline does not include "Down to a Sunless Sea", which has no internal clues as to its placement within Smith's chronology.

== Other stories ==
- "War No. 81-Q"
- "Western Science Is So Wonderful"
- "Nancy" (originally published as "The Nancy Routine")
- "The Fife of Bodidharma"
- "Angerhelm"
- "The Good Friends"

All of the stories in this collection are included in two paperback collections, When the People Fell (2007) and We, the Underpeople (2006). The latter also includes the revised 1995 text of the novel Norstrilia (1975), previously split into two volumes with some abridgement and restructuring as The Planet Buyer (1964) and The Underpeople (1968).
