= 2017 in public domain =

When a work's copyright expires, it enters the public domain. The following is a list of works that entered the public domain in 2017. Since laws vary globally, the copyright status of some works are not uniform.

== Entering the public domain in countries with life + 70 years ==
With the exception of Belarus, a work enters the public domain in Europe 70 years after the creator's death, if it was published during the creator's lifetime. The list is sorted alphabetically and includes a notable work of the creator that entered the public domain on January 1, 2017. This term also applies to unpublished works in the United States (otherwise see below).

Names	Country	Death	Occupation	Notable work
Giuseppe Adami	Italy	12 October 1946	librettist	Libretti for three operas composed by Giacomo Puccini
Eriks Ādamsons	Latvia	28 February 1946	writer, poet, translator	
Armando Augusto Freire (Armandinho)	Portugal	21 December 1946	Fado guitarist and composer	
Louis Bachelier	France	28 April 1946	Mathematician	
Herbert Baker	United Kingdom	4 February 1946	Architect	
Helen Bannerman	United Kingdom	3 October 1946	Writer	The Story of Little Black Sambo
Granville Bantock	United Kingdom	16 October 1946	composer	
James Bernard	United Kingdom	5 March 1946	Elocutionist	
Allan Cyril Brooks	Canada	3 January 1946	Ornithologist, illustrator and artist	
Alfonso Broqua	Uruguay	24 November 1946	Composer	
Charles Despiau	France	30 October 1946	Sculptor	
J. Michael Diack	United Kingdom	2 February 1946	Composer, arranger	Arranged nursery rhymes in the style of Handel
Manuel de Falla	Spain	14 November 1946	Composer	Nights in the Gardens of Spain, Ritual Fire Dance
W. C. Fields	United States	25 December 1946	Writer	
Jane Findlater	United Kingdom	20 May 1946	Writer	
Dion Fortune	United Kingdom	6 January 1946	Writer and occultist	The Demon Lover, The Winged Bull, The Goat-Foot God, The Sea Priestess
Wanda Gág	United States	27 June 1946	Children's book author, artist, translator and illustrator	Millions of Cats
Gerhart Hauptmann	Germany	6 June 1946	Writer, Nobel Prize laureate	The Weavers, Bahnwärter Thiel (De)
Patty Hill	United States	25 May 1946	Songwriter	Happy Birthday to You (with sister Mildred J. Hill, who predeceased her)
Violet Jacob	United Kingdom	9 September 1946	Writer and poet	
John Maynard Keynes	United Kingdom	21 April 1946	Economist	A Treatise on Money
Hermann von Keyserling	Germany	26 April 1946	Philosopher	
Otis Adelbert Kline	United States	24 October 1946	Literary agent and science fiction writer	
Paul Langevin	France	19 December 1946	Physicist	
Henri Le Fauconnier	France	1946	Painter	
Józef Mehoffer	Poland	8 July 1946	Painter and decorative artist	
Adolph de Meyer	France	6 January 1946	Photographer	
László Moholy-Nagy	Hungary	24 November 1946	Painter and photographer	Light-Space Modulator
Paul Nash	United Kingdom	11 July 1946	Painter/photographer	
Mikhail Nesterov	Russia	18 October 1942	Painter	
Feliks Nowowiejski	Poland	18 January 1946	Composer	Rota (music)
Clemente Palma	Peru	13 August 1946	Author	
Júlio Prestes	Brazil	9 February 1946	Politician	
Damon Runyon	United States	10 December 1946	Writer and newspaperman	
Abel Salazar (scientist)	Portugal	29 December 1946	Scientist and Painter	
Alice Sauvrezis	France	12 April 1946	Composer	
Ernest Thompson Seton	United Kingdom	23 October 1946	Writer and wildlife artist	Wild Animals I Have Known
May Sinclair	United Kingdom	14 November 1946	Writer	
Václav Špála	Czech Republic	13 May 1946	Painter	
Léon Spilliaert	Belgium	23 November 1946	Painter	
Gertrude Stein	United States	27 July 1946	Writer	The Autobiography of Alice B. Toklas, Three Lives
Karl Hans Strobl	Czech Republic	10 March 1946	Author and editor	
Harry Von Tilzer	United States	10 January 1946	Songwriter	Ziegfeld Follies
Frona Eunice Wait	United States	1946	Author and newspaper writer	Wines and Vines of California
George Henry Weiss	United States	1946	Writer of science fiction and poetry	The Night People
H. G. Wells	United Kingdom	13 August 1946	Writer	The Time Machine, The War of the Worlds, The Invisible Man
Stewart Edward White	United States	18 September 1946	Writer and spiritualist	
Cornel Simanjuntak	Indonesia	15 September 1946	Songwriter	Maju Tak Gentar, Sorak-Sorak Bergembira, Bungaku, Indonesia Tetap Merdeka, Ku Pinta Lagi, Maju Indonesia
Alfred Rosenberg	Germany	16 October 1946	Politician, writer	The Myth of the Twentieth Century
Paul Zech	Germany	7 September 1946	Poet	Die lasterhaften Balladen und Lieder des François Villon
Heinrich Freiherr von Stackelberg	Germany	12 October 1946	Economist	Marktform und Gleichgewicht

== Entering the public domain in countries with life + 50 years ==
In most countries of Africa and Asia, as well as Canada, Belarus, Bolivia, New Zealand, Egypt and Uruguay, a work enters the public domain 50 years after the creator's death.

Names	Country	Death	Occupation	Notable work
Ralph Allen	Canada	2 December 1966	Writer, journalist	Peace River Country
Lauro Ayestarán	Uruguay	22 July 1966	Musicologist	La música en el Uruguay
André Breton	France	28 September 1966	Writer, poet	Surrealist Manifesto
Jan Brzechwa	Poland	2 July 1966	Poet	
Deems Taylor	United States	3 July 1966	Composer, music critic	
Walt Disney	United States	15 December 1966	Filmmaker	
C. S. Forester	United Kingdom	2 April 1966	Writer	Horatio Hornblower, The African Queen, The General
Lloyd Garrett	United States	15 April 1966	Tenor, composer	
Alberto Giacometti	Switzerland	11 January 1966	Sculptor, painter	The Palace at 4 a.m., L'Homme au doigt, Grande tête mince, L'Homme qui marche I, Large Standing Woman I, Monumental Head
César Batlle Pacheco	Uruguay	6 January 1966	Politician, Journalist	
Olhinto María Simoes	Uruguay	9 October 1966	Poet, journalist	La sombra de los plátanos
Cordwainer Smith	United States	6 August 1966	Science fiction writer, professor, military officer	Psychological Warfare, Norstrilia, Scanners Live in Vain, Alpha Ralpha Boulevard, A Planet Named Shayol
Evelyn Waugh	United Kingdom	10 April 1966	Writer	Vile Bodies, A Handful of Dust
Mohamed Fawzi	Egypt	20 October 1966	Singer, Musician	Kassaman
Mohamed El Qasabgi	Egypt	25 March 1966	Musician	Raq El Habib
Badie' Khayri	Egypt	1 February 1966	Playwright	Hassan wa Murqus wa Cohen
Lekhnath Paudyal	Nepal	1966	Poet	Tarun Tapasi
Sayyid Qutb	Egypt	29 August 1966	Writer	Ma'alim fi al-Tariq, Fi Zilal al-Quran

== Entering the public domain in Australia ==
In 2004 copyright in Australia changed from a "plus 50" law to a "plus 70" law, in line with America and the European Union. But the change was not made retroactive (unlike the 1995 change in the European Union which brought some e.g. British authors back into copyright). Hence the work of an author who died before 1955 is normally in the public domain in Australia; but the copyright of authors was extended to 70 years after death for those who died in 1955 or later, and no more Australian authors would come out of copyright until 1 January 2026 (those who died in 1955).

== Entering the public domain in the United States ==
The Copyright Term Extension Act means no published works would enter the public domain in this jurisdiction until 2019. The exception are unpublished and unregistered works, which are subject to 70 years after the death of the creator, as above.

== Worldwide ==
The Australian band King Gizzard & the Lizard Wizard released their 2017 album Polygondwanaland into the public domain.

On the 7th of February 2017, the Metropolitan Museum of Art announced it will release 375,000 images into the public domain.

== See also ==
- List of countries' copyright lengths
- Public Domain Day
- Creative Commons
- Public Domain
- Over 300 public domain authors available in Wikisource (any language), with descriptions from Wikidata
- 1946 in literature, 1956 in literature, 1966 in literature and 1976 in literature

=== Lists of authors ===
- Authors listed in Wikidata who died in 1946
- Over 300 public domain authors available in Wikisource (any language), with descriptions from Wikidata
- "Authors by Year of Death - 1946". AuthorAndBookInfo.com.
