= Space Lords (short story collection) =

1965 book by Cordwainer Smith

- First edition
- Author: Cordwainer Smith
- Cover artist: Jack Gaughan
- Language: English
- Genre: Science fiction
- Publisher: Pyramid Books
- Publication date: May 1965
- Publication place: United States
- Media type: Print (paperback)
- Pages: 206
- OCLC: 16160860

Space Lords is a collection of science fiction short stories by the American writer Cordwainer Smith. It was first published by Pyramid Books in 1965. The stories belong to a series describing a future history set in the universe of the Instrumentality of Mankind.

== Dedicated ==
The book is dedicated "to the memory of Eleanor Jackson of Louisa, Virginia, 20 February 1919 to 30 November 1964". In a letter to her, the author explains that she was an African-American housekeeper for him during many years, and that she died unexpectedly while visiting him to help when he was sick and working on this book. (In Smith's novel Norstrilia, the hero is accompanied by his "workwoman Eleanor", to whom he shows great loyalty. "It's up to me to do what I can for her. Always.")

== Contents ==
- "Mother Hitton's Littul Kittons" (novelette first published in Galaxy Science Fiction June 1961)
- "The Dead Lady of Clown Town" (novella first published in Galaxy August 1964)
- "Drunkboat" (novelette first published in Amazing Stories October 1963)
- "The Ballad of Lost C'Mell" (novelette first published in Galaxy October 1962)
- A Planet Named Shayol" (novelette first published in Galaxy October 1961)
