= Alpha Ralpha Boulevard =

1961 short story by Cordwainer Smith

- Short story by Cordwainer Smith
- Country: USA
- Language: English
- Genre: Science fiction

Publication
- Published in: The Magazine of Fantasy and Science Fiction
- Publication type: Print (magazine, hardback, and paperback)
- Publisher: Mercury Press
- Publication date: June 1961

Chronology
- Series: Instrumentality of Mankind
Mother Hitton's Littul Kittons	A Planet Named Shayol

"Alpha Ralpha Boulevard" is a science fiction story by American writer Cordwainer Smith, set in his Instrumentality of Mankind universe, concerning the opening days of a sudden radical shift—from a controlling, benevolent, but sterile society, to one with individuality, danger, and excitement. The story has been reprinted a number of times, including in The Best of Cordwainer Smith and The Rediscovery of Man collections.

Ursula K. Le Guin said that "'Alpha Ralpha Boulevard' (...) was as important to me as reading Pasternak for the first time."

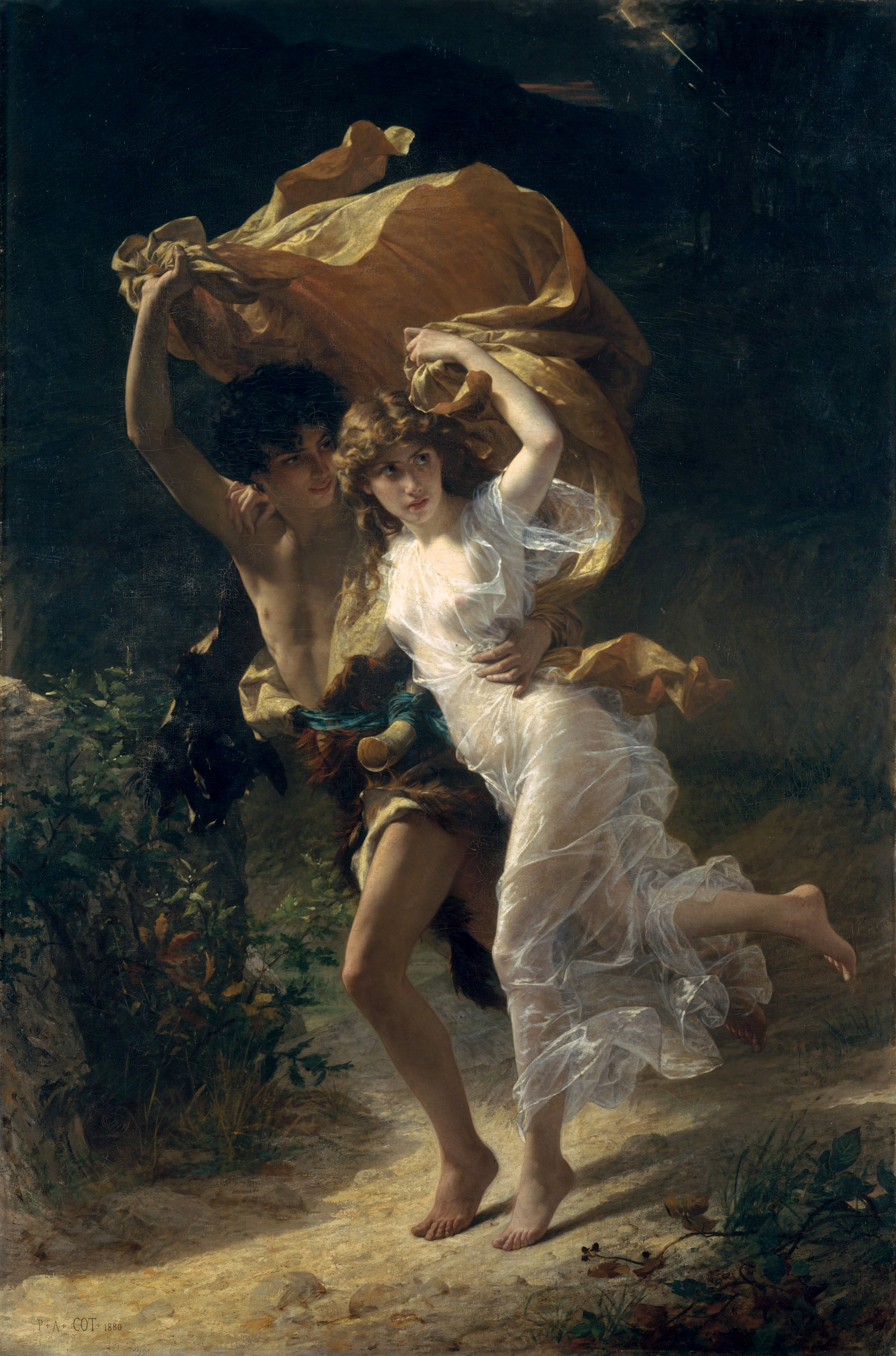
The Storm by Pierre-Auguste Cot, 1880

"Alpha Ralpha Boulevard" was inspired in part by a painting from Smith's childhood, The Storm by Pierre-Auguste Cot, of two young lovers fleeing along a darkening path. Additionally, the names of the two principal characters, together with the conscious attempt to revive a French culture, recall the 18th-century French novel Paul et Virginie. According to Smith's widow and second wife, it was also partly about his first wife's attraction to another man. The name of the story is likely derived from that of Ralph Alpher, who himself was convinced of the connection.

The ancient computer in the story is called the "Abba-dingo", which some Smith scholars have speculated may mean "Father of Lies"; others have noted similarities to "the French phrase 'l’abbé dingo', or 'mad priest'". The name is also evocative of Abednego, who, along with Shadrach and Mesach, survived the Biblical “fiery furnace” in Daniel 3.

== Plot summary ==
The all-powerful Instrumentality government, which in its overprotectiveness has driven the purpose from human existence, decides to turn back the clock to a less sheltered historical human era of 14,000 years before (i.e., our time). Virginia and Paul are enjoying the first moments of the recreations of the old human language, French, reading their first newspapers, and going to their first cafe, where the bugs in process are not resolved to the point of understanding how to use money.

With the restoration of cultural differences and new individuality, old friends Paul and Virginia fall in love. Not everything from the Instrumentality era has vanished, especially the underpeople, a subclass of people bred from animals such as dogs, cats, and bulls to provide manual labor. Paul is accosted by a provocative dog-girl, then by a drunken bull-man, who attacks them. A cat-girl, C'mell, rescues them from physical danger. She directs them to a cafe where Virginia begins to have qualms about the artificial aspects of the personality she's been given, and wonders whether her love for Paul is real or synthesized. She then meets another man she also finds attractive, Macht (a member of the Vomacht family prominent in Smith's future history). Macht tells her of a computer, the Abba-dingo, never understood by the Instrumentality, which has reached the status of a god, able to foretell the future. It can only be reached walking a ruined processional highway leading into the clouds: Alpha Ralpha Boulevard.

The three of them set off along, and up, the highway. Paul becomes worried when he realizes that the highway has no machines to supply food, water or medical help in case of accidents. Macht accidentally activates a moving walkway which carries him up the Boulevard rapidly; Paul and Virginia decide to follow. It transpires that the Boulevard has a large broken section, several kilometers above the ground, spanned only by hanging cables many meters below. Paul and Virginia are thrown off of the broken end of the moving walkway. Virginia's momentum carries her over the gap. Paul collides with the end of the roadway on the far side and has to hang on for dear life while Virginia pulls him up. They discover that Macht is crawling along a cable far below, but realize there is nothing they can do to help him. They continue upward until they finally reach the Abba-dingo, which seems to be an ancient computer system. It has a machine marked "Food", but they are disappointed to find that this no longer works. A machine marked "Meteorological" displays a sign which reads "Typhoon coming". A machine marked "Predictions" is surrounded by mysterious white objects which Paul slowly realizes are the bones of long-dead humans. Virginia puts her hand in a slot marked "Put paper here", which cuts words into her skin: "You will love Paul all your life." After bandaging her hand with a strip torn from his clothing, Paul inserts a strip into the slot. The machine prints "You will love Virginia twenty-one more minutes". Paul "accidentally" loses the strip to the wind and pretends his prediction was the same as hers.

The two set off back down as the typhoon begins lashing the Boulevard with wind and rain. By the time they arrive back at the gap twenty-one minutes later the storm is in full force and they are in danger of being blown off the road or struck by lightning. Macht is nowhere to be seen, having presumably fallen. C'mell reappears and tries to help Virginia, but Virginia recoils from being touched by an underperson and falls to her death. C'mell knocks Paul unconscious so that he will keep still while she carries him across the precarious cables.

Paul awakens at home to find himself being attended by a medical robot. Before C'mell returns to check on him, Paul ponders the nature of the machine that could make such accurate predictions, and grieves for his loss.

C'mell reappears as the title character in "The Ballad of Lost C'Mell", and plays a major role in the novel Norstrilia, in which Paul also makes a cameo appearance.

== See also ==
- The Ballad of Lost C'Mell
