= The Nine Billion Names of God =

1953 short story by Arthur C. Clarke

- Short story by Arthur C. Clarke
- 1974 collection of short stories
- Country: United Kingdom
- Language: English
- Genre: Science fiction

Publication
- Published in: Star Science Fiction Stories No. 1
- Publication type: Anthology
- Media type: Print, e-book, audiobook
- Publication date: 1953

"The Nine Billion Names of God" is a 1953 science fiction short story by British writer Arthur C. Clarke. The story was among the stories selected in 1970 by the Science Fiction Writers of America as one of the best science fiction short stories published before the creation of the Nebula Awards. It was reprinted in The Science Fiction Hall of Fame, Volume One, 1929–1964.

== Plot summary ==
In a Tibetan lamasery, the monks seek to list all of the names of God. They believe the Universe was created for this purpose, and that once this naming is completed, God will bring the Universe to an end. Three centuries ago, the monks created an alphabet in which they calculated they could encode all the possible names of God, numbering about 9,000,000,000 ("nine billion") and each having no more than nine characters. Writing the names out by hand, as they had been doing, even after eliminating various nonsense combinations, would take another 15,000 years; (Note: about 1600 per day) the monks wish to use modern technology to finish this task in 100 days. (Note: about 1000 per second)

They rent a computer capable of printing all the possible permutations, and hire two Westerners to install and program the machine. The computer operators are skeptical but play along. After three months, as the job nears completion, they fear that the monks will blame the computer (and, by extension, its operators) when nothing happens. The Westerners leave slightly earlier than their scheduled departure without warning the monks, so that it will complete its final print run shortly after they leave. On their way to the airfield they pause on the mountain path. Under a clear night sky they estimate that it must be just about the time that the monks are pasting the final printed names into their holy books. Then they notice that "overhead, without any fuss, the stars were going out".

== Reception ==
In 2004, "The Nine Billion Names of God" won the retrospective Hugo Award for Best Short Story for the year 1954. Kirkus Reviews called it "quietly remarkable", and The Guardian considered it to be a "wonderful apocalyptic rib-tickler". Stating that the story "introduced many Western readers to an intriguing speculation in Oriental religions", Carl Sagan in 1978 listed "The Nine Billion Names of God" as among the "rare few science‐fiction [stories that] combine a standard science‐fiction theme with a deep human sensitivity". In 1986 it was included in the anthology Isaac Asimov Presents The Great SF Stories 15 as one of the best science fiction short stories of 1953.

Gary K. Wolfe noted that the story is "patently at odds with Clarke's scientific rationalism". Paul J. Nahin has pointed out that, due to the delay imposed by the speed of light, an omniscient God would have had to destroy all the stars in the universe years earlier so that their "synchronized vanishing" would be visible at exactly the time that the monks completed their task.

In 2003, Clarke reported having been told that the Dalai Lama had found the story "very amusing".

== Adaptations ==
"The Nine Billion Names of God" was adapted into a 1985 episode of the Canadian radio series Vanishing Point.

In 2011 the story was loosely adapted into a 2011 Portuguese short film, Scr1ptum, by Swiss director Matthias Fritsche. In 2018, the story was adapted into a short film with the same title as the short story by Dominique Filhol.

== See also ==
- Brute-force attack
- Tower of Hanoi, a puzzle whose legendaria incorporate a similar end to the Universe
- "The Library of Babel", a 1941 short story by Jorge Luis Borges which also deals with collecting all the possible permutations of a character string
- "The Fife of Bodidharma", a 1959 short story by Cordwainer Smith, reprinted in The Rediscovery of Man
- Jorge Palma, a Portuguese singer whose 1972 song was named after and inspired by the story
- "The Nine Billion Names of God", a 1984 short story by Carter Scholz about an exact replica of Clarke's story (Note: See article by Arnaud Regnauld, « Du nom d'auteur au non-auteur : la signature en question dans les nouvelles de Carter Scholz », Cahiers du GRAAT n°35, « La négation : formes, figures, conceptualisation », Stéphanie Bonnefille et Sébastien Salbayre dir., Presses de l’université François Rabelais, Tours, octobre 2006, pp. 191–204)
- Darren Aronofsky's Pi (1998), in which a computer is used to divine the 216-character name of God
- "Seventy-Two Letters", a 2000 novella by Ted Chiang
- "Godfellas", a 2002 Futurama episode partially inspired by the story
- "Last Contact", a 2007 short story by Stephen Baxter about humans experiencing the universe ending in a Big Rip
- "Nightfall", a short story by Isaac Asimov with a similar climax
- "The Nine Billion Names of Penis", a short comic by Kurt Erichsen in Meatmen #15 (1993)
