= Isaac Asimov Presents The Great SF Stories 23 (1961) =

Collection of science fiction short stories

- First edition
- Editors: Isaac Asimov; Martin H. Greenberg
- Cover artist: Angus McKie
- Language: English
- Series: Isaac Asimov Presents The Great SF Stories
- Genre: Science fiction
- Publisher: DAW Books
- Publication date: July 1991
- Publication place: United States
- Media type: Print (hardback & paperback)
- Preceded by: Isaac Asimov Presents The Great SF Stories 22 (1960)
- Followed by: Isaac Asimov Presents The Great SF Stories 24 (1962)

Isaac Asimov Presents The Great SF Stories 23 (1961) is an American collection of science fiction short stories, the twenty-third volume of Isaac Asimov Presents The Great SF Stories, a series of short story collections, edited by Isaac Asimov and Martin H. Greenberg, which attempts to list the great science fiction stories from the Golden Age of Science Fiction. They date the Golden Age as beginning in 1939 and lasting until 1963. This volume was originally published by DAW books in July 1991.

== Stories ==
1. "The Highest Treason" by Randall Garrett
2. "Hothouse" by Brian W. Aldiss
3. "Hiding Place" by Poul Anderson
4. "What is This Thing Called Love?" by Isaac Asimov
5. "A Prize for Edie" by J. F. Bone
6. "The Ship Who Sang" by Anne McCaffrey
7. "Death and the Senator" by Arthur C. Clarke
8. "The Quaker Cannon" by Frederik Pohl and Cyril M. Kornbluth
9. "The Moon Moth" by Jack Vance
10. "A Planet Named Shayol" by Cordwainer Smith
11. "Rainbird" by R. A. Lafferty
12. "Wall of Crystal, Eye of Night" by Algis Budrys
13. "Remember the Alamo!" by T. R. Fehrenbach
