= Robert Silverberg Presents the Great SF Stories: 1964 =

- First edition cover
- Editors: Robert Silverberg; Martin H. Greenberg
- Cover artist: Eddie Jones
- Language: English
- Series: Isaac Asimov Presents The Great SF Stories
- Genre: Science fiction
- Publisher: NESFA Press
- Publication date: December 2001
- Publication place: United States
- Media type: Print (hardback)
- Pages: 395
- ISBN: 1-886778-21-3
- Preceded by: Isaac Asimov Presents The Great SF Stories 25 (1963)

Robert Silverberg Presents the Great SF Stories: 1964 is an American anthology of short stories, edited by Robert Silverberg and Martin H. Greenberg, first published in hardcover by NESFA Press in December 2001. It is a continuation of the Isaac Asimov Presents The Great SF Stories series of short story anthologies, which attempts to list the great science fiction stories from the Golden Age of Science Fiction. This book is a continuation of the book series The Great SF Stories originally edited by Isaac Asimov and Martin H. Greenberg (books #1-#25) with the last one published in 1992.

The anthology includes fifteen short stories, novelettes and novellas by various authors original published in 1964, together with a preface and introduction by Silverberg.

== Contents ==
- "Foreword" (Robert Silverberg)
- "Introduction" (Robert Silverberg)
- "Outward Bound" (Norman Spinrad)
- "The Kragen" (Jack Vance)
- "The Master Key" (Poul Anderson)
- "The Crime and the Glory of Commander Suzdal" (Cordwainer Smith)
- "The Graveyard Heart" (Roger Zelazny)
- "Purple Priestess of the Mad Moon" (Leigh Brackett)
- "The Last Lonely Man" (John Brunner)
- "Soldier, Ask Not" (Gordon R. Dickson)
- "A Man of the Renaissance" (Wyman Guin)
- "The Dowry of Angyar" (Ursula K. Le Guin)
- "When the Change-Winds Blow" (Fritz Leiber)
- "The Fiend" (Frederik Pohl)
- "The Life Hater" (Fred Saberhagen)
- "Neighbor" (Robert Silverberg)
- "Four Brands of Impossible" (Norman Kagan)

== Reception ==
The anthology was reviewed by Don D'Ammassa in Science Fiction Chronicle no. 222, March 2002, Steven Sawicki in Science Fiction Chronicle no. 224, May 2002, Tom Easton in Analog Science Fiction and Fact, July-August 2002, Kathryn S. Morrow in The New York Review of Science Fiction, August 2002, and Batya Weinbaum in SFRA Review no. 265, 2003.
