= Isaac Asimov Presents The Great SF Stories 24 (1962) =

- First edition
- Editors: Isaac Asimov; Martin H. Greenberg
- Cover artist: Angus McKie
- Language: English
- Series: Isaac Asimov Presents The Great SF Stories
- Genre: Science fiction
- Publisher: DAW Books
- Publication date: January 1992
- Publication place: United States
- Media type: Print (hardback & paperback)
- Preceded by: Isaac Asimov Presents The Great SF Stories 23 (1961)
- Followed by: Isaac Asimov Presents The Great SF Stories 25 (1963)

Isaac Asimov Presents The Great SF Stories 24 (1962) is an American collection of science fiction short stories, the twenty-fourth volume in the Isaac Asimov Presents The Great SF Stories, a series of short story collections, edited by Isaac Asimov and Martin H. Greenberg, which attempts to list the great science fiction stories from the Golden Age of Science Fiction. They date the Golden Age as beginning in 1939 and lasting until 1963. This volume was originally published by DAW books in January 1992.

== Stories ==
1. "The Insane Ones" by J. G. Ballard
2. "Christmas Treason" by James White
3. "Seven-Day Terror" by R. A. Lafferty
4. "Kings Who Die" by Poul Anderson
5. "The Man Who Made Friends with Electricity" by Fritz Leiber
6. "Hang Head, Vandal!" by Mark Clifton
7. "The Weather Man" by Theodore L. Thomas
8. "Earthlings Go Home!" by Mack Reynolds
9. "The Streets of Ashkelon" by Harry Harrison
10. "When You Care, When You Love" by Theodore Sturgeon
11. "The Ballad of Lost C'Mell" by Cordwainer Smith
12. "Gadget vs. Trend" by Christopher Anvil
13. "Roofs of Silver" by Gordon R. Dickson
