= When the People Fell =

1959 short story by Cordwainer Smith

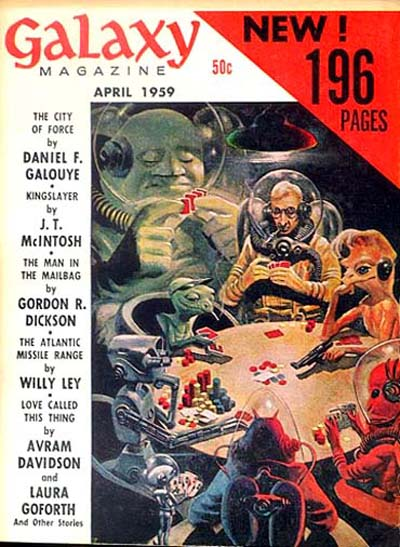
- Country: USA
- Language: English
- Genre: Science fiction

Publication
- Published in: Galaxy Science Fiction
- Publication type: Periodical
- Publisher: World Editions
- Media type: Print (Magazine)
- Publication date: April 1959

Chronology
- Series: Instrumentality of Mankind
The Lady Who Sailed the Soul	Think Blue, Count Two

"When the People Fell" is a science fiction short story by American writer Cordwainer Smith, set in his "Instrumentality of Mankind" universe. It was originally published in Galaxy Science Fiction magazine in April 1959, and it is collected in the book The Rediscovery of Man, in addition to the collection of which it is the title story. The story takes place relatively early in the Instrumentality timeline, and a "scanner Vomact" appears in both this story and the classic story "Scanners Live in Vain".

The story recounts, in "flashback" form—an interview between a reporter and a crusty old-timer—a risky attempt by a future Chinese government to claim and settle the planet Venus, at a time when China is the only ethnic nation on Earth that has survived as a distinct entity through a global nuclear war and a long dark age that followed. The story implicitly compares Western and Chinese approaches to solving an impossible problem and shows the Chinese solution as successful, but at a price that Westerners would find repugnant.

== Plot summary ==
The setting is the type of benign Venus imagined before the first space probes penetrated the clouds of that planet. Colonization has become stymied by the native inhabitants (loudies), who are apparently sentient bubbles that float around the landscape, getting in the way of human progress. Attempts to communicate with them produce no response. Confining them is useless (they drift back) and killing them produces a deadly explosion that contaminates a thousand acres (4 km²). The non-Chinese authorities of the early Instrumentality government have no answer.

The ruler of Goonhogo (the entity that replaced China under the early Instrumentality) decrees that 82 million Chinesians (men, women, and children) be dropped from space, parachuting down to the surface. Each one has a simple mission — herd the bubbles together. Many die in the process, both in landing and from the bubbles exploding. The rest corralled the loudies together into herds, where they eventually starve, wiping out the species. Meanwhile, more Chinese parachute down with rice seeds and begin planting. Eventually, by sheer weight of numbers, the Chinese conquer Venus.

Smith's point in the story is evidently to demonstrate how Chinese attitudes such as fatalism and obedience to authority, coupled with their large numbers, could outperform the "Yankee ingenuity" and "self-reliant individual" attitudes predominant in mainstream 1950s American science fiction of the time. (However, it is implied that the separate Chinese government and Chinese ethnic identity of the time of the Venus colonization no longer exist in the same form by the time of the story's "frame" interview.)

== Collection ==
When the People Fell
- Author: Cordwainer Smith; Genevieve Linebarger; Frederik Pohl (intro); Hank Davis (editor)
- Cover artist: Tom Kidd
- Language: English
- Series: Instrumentality of Mankind; Casher O'Neill
- Genre: Science fiction
- Publisher: Baen Books
- Publication date: September 2007 (trade); August 28, 2012 (paperback)
- Publication place: United States
- Media type: Trade paperback, paperback
- Pages: 599 (trade); 848 (paperback)
- ISBN: 978-1-4165-2146-4

In 2007, Baen Books released a 599-page collection titled When the People Fell in trade paperback format, which contained this short story and 28 other short works by Smith, in addition an introductory essay by the writer and editor Frederik Pohl. The story was re-released in 2012 in mass market paperback form (with 848 pages). All of the story texts in this collection and its companion, We, The Underpeople, are derived from the revised and corrected NESFA Press editions of Smith's work in the 1990s.
