= Atomsk =

Atomsk may refer to:

- Atomsk (novel), a novel by Carmichael Smith (Paul M. A. Linebarger)
- Atomsk (FLCL character), a character in the anime FLCL
