= The Dead Lady of Clown Town =

1964 novella by Cordwainer Smith

"The Dead Lady of Clown Town" is a science fiction novella by American writer Cordwainer Smith, set in his Instrumentality of Mankind future history. It was originally published in Galaxy Science Fiction magazine in 1964. It was included in the collection The Best of Cordwainer Smith and most recently in The Rediscovery of Man short story collection. A graphic novel adaptation by Elaine Lee and Michael Kaluta was planned for publication by DC Comics during the late 1980s, but it never materialized.

== Background ==
Cordwainer Smith wrote several stories set in a fictional universe called the Instrumentality of Mankind. Although humanity achieves a utopian state, people live sterile and shallow lives. The "underpeople" are animals who have been heavily modified to appear human and possess human intelligence. Despite this change, they have no rights and are treated like animals, to be used and destroyed without hesitation. The story takes obvious inspiration from the story of Joan of Arc. There are also points of commonality with the US Civil Rights Movement and the early Christians.

The story tells how D'Joan becomes a martyr for the underpeople; this event leads to the founding of the religion of "The Robot, the Rat, and the Copt", which stands behind the future vision of love and equality that underlies the ending of the novel Norstrilia.

"The Dead Lady of Clown Town" is set at least seven generations before another of Smith's short stories, "The Ballad of Lost C'Mell".

== Plot summary ==
The story is set on the planet Fomalhaut III. A therapist named Elaine becomes involved with a group of fugitive underpeople, living in a maze of drab service corridors jokingly dubbed "Clown Town", who are being helped by Lady Panc Ashash (a personality recording of a deceased Lady of the Instrumentality, hence the eponymous "Dead Lady") and a telepath called The Hunter. Panc Ashash had predicted Elaine's coming, and how she would help the dog-girl D'joan create history.

With help from Elaine and the Hunter, D'joan leads the fugitives from their hiding place in a march into a city. The underpeople go knowingly to their deaths professing their love and asserting that they too are people to the humans they meet along the way. Soldiers eventually arrive and end the revolution by killing all the underpeople, with the sole exception of D'joan. One of the Ladies of the Instrumentality on the scene chooses to put D'joan on trial, remarkable since underpeople did not have any such right. D'joan is sentenced to be burned to death.

However, the martyrdom of D'joan and the underpeople affect the human participants and witnesses in powerful, unanticipated ways. The lasting consequences eventually lead to the rebirth of religion, rights for the underpeople, and the Rediscovery of Man. One of those most moved is a Lady of the Instrumentality. She decides to gene code a son to strive for justice for the underpeople. He is an ancestor of Lord Jestocost, who plays a critical role in "The Ballad of Lost C'Mell" and Norstrilia.

== See also ==
- Cultural depictions of Joan of Arc
