= The Medieval Underworld =

1972 book by Andrew McCall

- Author: Andrew McCall
- Language: English
- Genre: Non-fiction
- Publication date: 1972
- Publication place: United States
- ISBN: 978-0-750-93727-6

The Medieval Underworld is a 1972 illustrated book authored by Andrew McCall, published by Barnes & Noble Books in New York. It details the basis for criminal and ecclesiastical justice from the fall of Rome to about 1500.

The book has been distinguished in Mark Galeotti's Paths of Wickedness and Crimes for its discussion of organized crime in medieval Europe, and it forms part of the basis of the IEA's overview course on Crime and Society.

== Overview ==
In popular culture, The Medieval Underworld has been suggested as a source of primary material for role-playing game developers.

== See also ==
- Thieves' guild
