= The Roads Must Roll =

1940 science fiction short story by Robert A. Heinlein

"The Roads Must Roll" was originally published in the June 1940 issue of Astounding Science Fiction.

"The Roads Must Roll" is a 1940 science fiction short story by American writer Robert A. Heinlein. It was selected for The Science Fiction Hall of Fame, Volume One, 1929–1964 anthology in 1970.

The story is set in the near future, when "roadtowns" (wide rapidly moving passenger platforms similar to moving sidewalks, but reaching speeds of 100 mph) have replaced highways and railways as the dominant transportation method in the United States.

Heinlein's themes are technological change and social cohesion. The fictional social movement he calls "functionalism" (which is unrelated to the real-life sociological theory of the same name), advances the idea that one's status and level of material reward in a society must and should depend on the functions one performs for that society.

== Plot summary ==
In the first section of the narrative, a stormy meeting takes place at a Sacramento Sector Guild Hall of the technicians working "down inside", among the very noisy great rotors which keep the moving roads going. Speakers voice various grievances and call for immediate strike action. "Shorty" Van Kleeck, the Chief Deputy Engineer of the Sacramento sector, appears and declares his sympathy with the technicians' demands and effectively places himself at their head. As would become clear later, it was Van Kleeck who instigated the technicians' agitation in the first place.

The road's workforce is sharply divided into two classes – the technicians, who are unionized civilians, and the engineers, who are organized as Transport Cadets, an elite paramilitary organization formed by the US Military to keep this crucial infrastructure running. The technicians feel some hostility to the "arrogant" engineers. Van Kleeck – himself a senior engineer who had "come up from the ranks" manipulates this hostility, with the intention of catapulting himself into a position of personal power.

After this initial scene, the point of view shifts – and remains for the rest of the story – to Van Kleeck's superior Larry Gaines, Chief Engineer of the Diego-Reno Roadtown – at the outset yet unaware of the brewing trouble. He is busy entertaining Mr. Blenkinsop, the Australian Transport Minister, who is looking into Road technology with an eye to introducing it in Australia. Gaines's explanation of the Road machinery to Blenkinsop is a device to bring the reader into the world of the Roads.

Larry Gaines is dining with his Australian guest in a moving restaurant on the road when one of the moving sidewalk strips stops unexpectedly. This causes a chain reaction of people falling from the stopped strip onto the fast moving strips next to it, and vice versa. The entire length of the Road becomes a scene of carnage. The reader already knows that this was the result of the ruthless action taken by Van Kleeck and his confederates. Gaines quickly concludes that this is no mechanical failure but sabotage, and that the technicians who maintain the Stockton section of the road are responsible. The rebels have stopped the strip – heedless of the resulting killing and wounding of numerous people traveling the moving road – as a demonstration to encourage their fellow technicians around the country to rebel against the Cadets.

Gaines calls the Stockton office and learns that the leader of the rebellion is his own deputy Van Kleeck, who defiantly declares "The Functionalist Revolution". Holding to a radical social theory, Functionalism, the rebel technicians were persuaded that their role in maintaining the nation's transport infrastructure is more important than that of any other workers and that they should therefore be in control. Blenkinsop is left behind at one of Road stations as Gaines takes charge of the advance on the Stockton office.

Going into the machinery under the roadway that runs it, Gaines takes command of the response. He does not order the Road stopped, since that would leave millions of commuters stranded, but instead has the military evacuate the riders, a time-consuming procedure. In command of a hastily gathered corps of armed cadets, he proceeds up the underground access tunnel toward Stockton on "tumblebugs," motorized and gyroscopically stabilized unicycles much like the later real-life Segway. As the military advance proceeds, they arrest rebel technicians and cross connect the wiring of the machinery, motor by motor, to take control away from the rebels in the Stockton office.

Over the videophone Van Kleeck warns that he has a button rigged to blow up the Road if Gaines does not capitulate – which could cause countless deaths, possibly running into millions. Gaines does not understand how Van Kleeck has gotten so many technicians to side with him; psychological screening tests are supposed to guarantee that technicians do not have the temperament to revolt. Then Gaines realizes that Deputy Van Kleeck was able to move revolution-prone workers into his sector because, as deputy, Van Kleeck had access to the psychological files on the technicians. Gaines accesses Shorty's psychological profile and studies the neurotic traits that have made him a demagogue.

Asking for a parley, Gaines is taken to the Stockton office and faces Shorty. There he uses his knowledge of Shorty's psychology to push him into a nervous breakdown and overpowers him, gaining control of the 'suicide' button. The Cadets attack the office and the rebellion is ended.

Later, Gaines ponders the changes that will have to be made to make sure there is never a recurrence of these events: more psychological testing, more careful oversight, and more esprit de corps. He concludes that the price of high-tech transportation like the Roadways is eternal vigilance. He then suddenly realizes that he had let the Australian Transport Minister kick his heels in an empty office the whole night, and rushes off to apologize.

== Themes ==
Damon Knight, in his introduction to the paperback edition from the New English Library edition of The Past Through Tomorrow, Vol 1., compares the story to the then-current power of Jimmy Hoffa and the Teamsters Union. He also notes that Heinlein successfully predicted urban sprawl driven by cheap and efficient transport, as well as the development of 'pseudopods' of urban development between communities. Farah Mendlesohn linked the story to corporatism.

== Adaptation ==
"The Roads Must Roll" was adapted for the radio shows Dimension X in 1950 and X Minus One in 1956.

== Sources ==
- Silverberg, Robert, ed. (1970). The Science Fiction Hall of Fame, Volume One, 1929–1964. Doubleday. pp. 52–86. OCLC 37684077. Reprint: ISBN 0-7653-0537-2.
