= Isaac Asimov Presents The Great SF Stories 25 (1963) =

1963 science fiction collection

- First edition cover
- Editors: Isaac Asimov; Martin H. Greenberg
- Cover artist: Bob Layzell
- Language: English
- Series: Isaac Asimov Presents The Great SF Stories
- Genre: Science fiction
- Publisher: DAW Books
- Publication date: July 1992
- Publication place: United States
- Media type: Print (hardback & paperback)
- Preceded by: Isaac Asimov Presents The Great SF Stories 24 (1962)
- Followed by: Robert Silverberg Presents the Great SF Stories: 1964

Isaac Asimov Presents The Great SF Stories 25 (1963) is an American collection of science fiction stories, the last regular volume of the Isaac Asimov Presents The Great SF Stories series of short story collections, edited by Isaac Asimov and Martin H. Greenberg, which attempts to list the great science fiction stories from the Golden Age of Science Fiction. They date the Golden Age as beginning in 1939 and lasting until 1963. This volume was originally published by DAW books in July 1992.

== Stories ==
1. "Fortress Ship" by Fred Saberhagen
2. "Not in the Literature" by Christopher Anvil
3. "The Totally Rich" by John Brunner
4. "No Truce with Kings" by Poul Anderson
5. "New Folks' Home" by Clifford D. Simak
6. "The Faces Outside" by Bruce McAllister
7. "Hot Planet" by Hal Clement
8. "The Pain Peddlers" by Robert Silverberg
9. "Turn Off the Sky" by Ray Nelson
10. "They Don't Make Life Like They Used To" by Alfred Bester
11. "Bernie the Faust" by William Tenn
12. "A Rose for Ecclesiastes" by Roger Zelazny
13. "If There Were No Benny Cemoli" by Philip K. Dick
