= Drunkboat (short story) =

1963 short story by Cordwainer Smith

- Short story by Cordwainer Smith
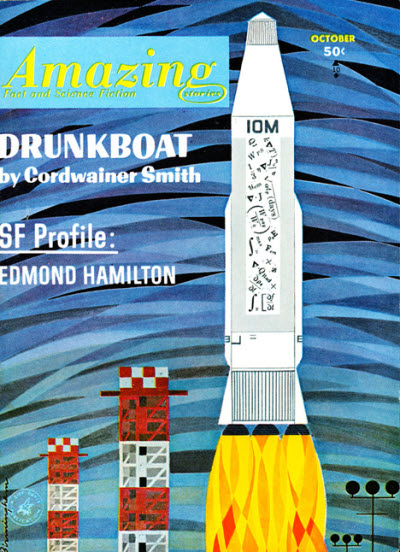
- Country: USA
- Language: English
- Genre: Science fiction

Publication
- Published in: Amazing Stories
- Publication type: Magazine
- Publication date: October 1963
- Series: Instrumentality of Mankind

"Drunkboat" is a science fiction short story by the American writer Cordwainer Smith (a pen name of Paul Linebarger). It was first published in the magazine Amazing Stories in October 1963. It was included in Space Lords, a collection of five stories by Smith, published in May 1965. The story appeared in The Instrumentality of Mankind, a collection published in May 1979; it was also included in The Rediscovery of Man, a complete collection of Smith's short stories, published in 1993.

== Background ==
"Drunkboat" was based on Smith's earlier story "The Colonel Came Back from the Nothing-at-All", which had failed to find a publisher in 1955. In 1963, Cele Goldsmith asked Smith to provide a story for Amazing Stories to match a pre-existing illustration, and the earlier story became a basis for "Drunkboat". "The Colonel Came Back from the Nothing-at-All", in a revised version produced in 1958, was first published in the collection The Instrumentality of Mankind.

Like Smith's other stories, "Drunkboat" belongs to a future history, in a universe policed by the Instrumentality of Mankind. The lords and ladies of the Instrumentality are benign but all-powerful. Their slogan is quoted in the story's seventh chapter: "Watch, but do not govern; stop war but do not wage it; protect, but do not control; and first, survive!"

The story is based partly on "Le Bateau ivre" ("The Drunken Boat"), a poem written by Arthur Rimbaud in 1871, in which vivid imagery is used to describe the experience of a drifting boat as it fills with water. In Smith's story, this becomes the experience of a man who is sent through a special form of space known as space^{3}.

== Plot summary ==
The story is introduced as a famous legend, often recalled in later years.

Lord Crudelta, wanting to experiment with sending a person through space-three (usually written as space^{3}), selects Artyr Rambo; he is in a hospital on Earth Four, anxious to find his lover Elizabeth. (The name "Artyr Rambo" is a phonetic spelling of "Arthur Rimbaud": "y" is the standard phonetic symbol for the vowel written "u" in French.) Having sent Elizabeth, who is dangerously ill, to a hospital on Earth, Crudelta constructs a special spaceship which sends Rambo through space^{3}, almost immediately arriving on Earth. He is found naked and unconscious lying on grass by the hospital. In the hospital, he remains inert; the doctors wonder who he is and what explains the unique unresponsive state they find he is in. Space^{3} has given Rambo special powers: aware of Elizabeth's presence in the building, he tears his way through a wall, and his uttered word "No", when he cannot see her, has an effect on technology in the area. Back in his hospital bed, he speaks gibberish when the doctors try to talk to him.

Crudelta travels, by normal means, from Earth Four to Earth. Believing that Rambo might be a danger to humanity, he seizes troops and they enter the hospital. The leading soldiers turn and attack those behind. In two minutes of confusion, many people are killed. Rambo, asleep and unaware of his powers, had caused the troops nearest Elizabeth to defend her against the rest.

There is later a trial of Lord Crudelta. He tells the Investigating Lord that he induced rage in Rambo by saying that Elizabeth was at the edge of death, so that he would want to come faster to Earth than anyone had done, to make him travel through space^{3}. He says he chose Earth Four to select someone, because it was a planet of explorers and adventurers where the rage level was already high.

When Rambo testifies, he becomes articulate when he describes the journey through space^{3}; he says "I was the ship.... I was the drunkboat myself", and he expresses the experience with striking imagery (taken from Arthur Rimbaud's poem "Le Bateau ivre").

For Crudelta, the conclusion of the panel of seven Lords of the Instrumentality is "He has many troubles ahead of him, and we wish to add to them." Rambo and Elizabeth are brought back to health and are free to continue their lives. Although their relationship has less intensity than formerly on Earth Four, he is happy: "A man who has been through space^{3} needs very little in life, outside of not going back to space^{3}."

== Reception ==
Ursula K. Le Guin called "Drunkboat" a "wild jungle of language" and a "tour de force" that was nonetheless "overwritten", noting that it is "full of awfully bad verse" (noting particularly the millennia-old nonsense verses that Lord Crudelta "laboriously" explains).
