= Scanners Live in Vain =

1950 short story by Cordwainer Smith

- Short story by Cordwainer Smith
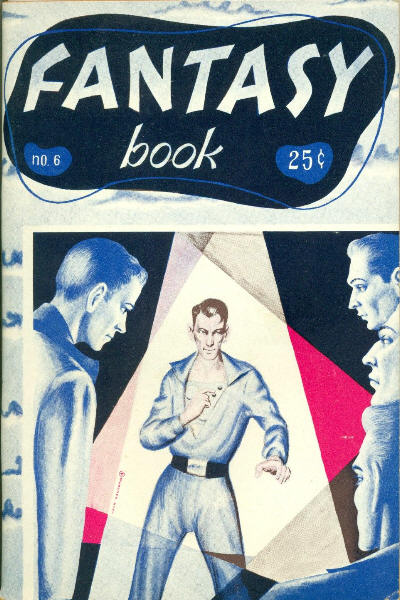
- Cover illustration by Jack Gaughan
- Country: United States
- Language: English
- Genre: Science fiction

Publication
- Published in: Fantasy Book volume 1, number 6
- Publication type: Periodical
- Media type: Print
- Publication date: January 1950 [written 1945]

"Scanners Live in Vain" is a science fiction short story by American writer Cordwainer Smith, the pen name of Paul Linebarger. The story was the first to be published in Smith's future history called the Instrumentality of Mankind and the first to appear under the pseudonym of Cordwainer Smith. It was initially published in the semi-professional magazine Fantasy Book in 1950, five years after it was written.

"Scanners Live in Vain" was judged by the Science Fiction Writers of America to be one of the best science fiction short stories before 1965; for this reason, it was included in the anthology The Science Fiction Hall of Fame, Volume One, 1929–1964. The story was nominated for a Retro-Hugo award for Best Novelette in 2001. It has been published in Hebrew, Italian, French, Croatian, German, and Dutch translations.

== Plot summary ==
Conscious humans cannot travel through outer space because of an effect called the "Great Pain of Space", which eventually causes death, so space travel is possible only in artificial hibernation. Ships are crewed by "habermans", convicted criminals who have undergone a surgical procedure to sever almost all sensory nerves, rendering them unable to hear, smell or feel, although they can still see. A haberman monitors and controls his bodily functions via a box of electronic instruments implanted in his chest, and communicates by writing on a tablet. In space, habermans are supervised by Scanners, people who have voluntarily undergone the same surgery. Unlike habermans, Scanners are widely honored for their self-sacrifice which makes space travel possible.

Martel is a Scanner who is, unusually, married to a normal woman. He has just "cranched", a process which temporarily restores his senses to a state of normality. The Scanners' leader Vomact calls an emergency meeting of all Scanners, and requires Martel to attend, even though his cranched state would normally excuse him from a meeting. Vomact reveals that a scientist named Adam Stone will soon make public a method to circumvent the Great Pain of Space and allow space travel for normal humans. Since this will make the Scanners redundant, he proposes that Stone should be killed. After lengthy discussion, the Scanners vote to do so.

Martel and his friend Chang object to this plan, but Chang refuses to defy the vote. He tells Martel that another of his friends, Parizianski, has been chosen to kill Stone. Martel travels to Stone's apartment to warn him. Parizianski appears, and Martel reluctantly kills him. Over time, the Scanners are surgically restored to normality and become spaceship pilots, retaining their guild and prestige. The failed murder plot is covered up by explaining that Parizianski died because he neglected to monitor his bodily functions due to his joy in learning of Stone's work.

== Background ==
"Scanners Live in Vain" was Linebarger's second published science fiction story after "War No. 81-Q", which had been published in his high-school magazine. (Linebarger had written the latter story at the age of 15.) "Scanners Live in Vain" was written in 1945. It had been rejected a number of times until its acceptance and publication in Fantasy Book in 1950. Fantasy Book was a low circulation obscure semi-professional magazine, but it was noticed by science fiction writer and editor Frederik Pohl. Pohl, who had himself, under a pseudonym, co-authored (with Isaac Asimov) a story which appeared in that issue, was impressed with the story's powerful style and imagery. Pohl republished it in 1952 in the more widely-read anthology Beyond the End of Time. Even then, the true identity of "Cordwainer Smith" remained a mystery and a topic of speculation for science fiction writers and fans. Pohl has said that "Scanners Live in Vain" "is perhaps the chief reason why Fantasy Book is remembered".

It has been anthologized numerous times. A revised text, based on Linebarger's original manuscript, appears in the 1993 NESFA Press collection The Rediscovery of Man (where it is accompanied by a facsimile of his original cover letter) and the 2007 collection When the People Fell.

== Reception and interpretation ==
In 1984, science fiction scholar Alan C. Elms suggested that "Scanners Live in Vain" reflects Smith's own deep psychological pain, symbolized by the "Great Pain of Space" (which is described in terms reminiscent of depression) and the isolation of the Scanners. The outcome of the story can by this interpretation be seen as indicative of his acceptance of help.

John Clute, writing in The Encyclopedia of Science Fiction, judged the story to be "one of his [Smith's] finest works" which initially remained unpublished "perhaps because its foreboding intensity made the editors of the time uneasy". Regarding the Scanners, Clute described the "functional loss of the sensory region of their brains" as having "an effect on their behaviour that resembles severe autism".

Robert Silverberg called it "one of the classic stories of science fiction" and noted its "sheer originality of concept" and its "deceptive and eerie simplicity of narrative".

John J. Pierce, in his introduction to the anthology The Best of Cordwainer Smith (1975), commented on the strong sense of religion it shares with Smith's other works, likening the "Code of the Scanners" to the "Saying of the Law" in H. G. Wells' The Island of Doctor Moreau (1896).

Graham Sleight, writing in Locus in 2007, lauded Smith's depiction of Martel's cranched perspective, calling it "a story about absence", but faulted his portrayal of Martel's wife Luci, whom he describes as "just a plot device".
