= The Nine Billion Names of God (Scholz) =

Short story by Carter Scholz

- Short story by Carter Scholz
- Language: English
- Genre: Science fiction

Publication
- Published in: Light Years and Dark: Science Fiction and Fantasy of and for Our Time
- Publication type: Book
- Publication date: 1984

"The Nine Billion Names of God" is an epistolary science fiction/metafiction short story, by Carter Scholz. It was first published in 1984, in the anthology Light Years and Dark: Science Fiction and Fantasy of and for Our Time.

== Synopsis ==
After author Carter Scholz submits a story to a science fiction magazine, the editor rejects it for being an exact copy of Arthur C. Clarke's 1953 short story "The Nine Billion Names of God". Scholz and the editor then exchange several letters about the nature of reality and fiction.

== Reception ==
Orson Scott Card called the story "unforgettable", while in the Los Angeles Times, Ed Park described it as an "amusing cover version" of Clarke, and "deeper-than-it-looks". The New York Times felt that the story suffered from "too strong a wall of irony".

Locus noted that although the story begins as "one of those epistolary-story goofs that used to turn up in the [science fiction] magazines", it soon "develops a sharper bite".

SF Signal praised it as "a fascinating idea-centric story", and emphasized that it "works on multiple fronts, whether it’s on the metafictional level or in sheer plot." The SF Site, conversely, felt that it "isn't SF at all", while noting that it nonetheless "could be considered a kind of science fiction criticism".
