= Thieves' guild =

Organization of professional thieves in popular fiction

In popular fiction, a thieves' guild is a formal association of criminals who participate in theft-related organized crime. The trope has been explored in literature, cinema, comic books, and gaming, such as in the Fafhrd and the Gray Mouser story "Thieves' House" by Fritz Leiber and the role-playing game Dungeons & Dragons. Though these more modern works are fictitious, the concept is inspired by real-world examples from history, such as Jonathan Wild and his gang of thieves.

== Literary antecedents ==
Some stories of One Thousand and One Nights celebrated artful thieves and criminal brotherhoods with a hierarchy and code of honor. The Sandalwood Merchant and the Sharpers features an old man known as the "Sheikh of Thieves" who delivered judgement on less experienced sharpers. This was based on actual thieves' guilds in Cairo in the Ottoman period, that were known to return stolen goods for a price, and which were managed by a sheikh. These survived up until the 19th century, and were mentioned by Edward William Lane in the 1830s.

A central feature of Miguel de Cervantes' story Rinconete y Cortadillo, set in sixteenth-century Seville, is the city's strong and well-organized thieves' guild built to the model of the medieval guild. As in any other profession, a young thief must start as an apprentice and slowly work his way to become a master craftsman—in this case, a master thief. No one could come into a city and start on a career as a thief without belonging to the local guild (as Cervantes' protagonists soon find out), which would have been in many cases true also for a medieval tailor or carpenter wandering into a strange city. Thieves also have their own church where they go to pray (shared with prostitutes).

== Fantasy fiction ==
- Lankhmar, in Fritz Leiber's Fafhrd and the Gray Mouser series has an important Thieves Guild, both within the fictional setting and in its influence on subsequent fantasy works and role-playing games.
- Ankh-Morpork Thieves' Guild (Discworld)
- In the works of Raymond E Feist set in Midkemia a Thieves' Guild, known as the Mockers, based in the Kingdom city of Krondor features in many of the novels, often playing a significant role in the story. The guild is run by a mysterious figure known as the 'Upright Man.'
- The Black Magician series, by Trudi Canavan, involves a Thieves' Guild as a central plot element.
- David Eddings' series tend to include Thieves' Guilds, such as in The Elenium and The Tamuli. The Belgariad and The Mallorean imply that the intelligence services of Drasnia and Mallorea are analogous to thieves guilds, particularly in the characterization of Prince Khelder of Drasnia (aka Silk, Ambar of Kotu or Radek of Boktor).
- The Marvel Comics character Gambit is a member and heir of the New Orleans thieves guild, adopted son to Jean-Luc LeBeau, the King of Thieves. He would later join the X-Men.
- In John Norman's Gor series, there is a "caste of thieves" in the city of Port Kar.
- The Rattlebone Brotherhood, uniting "thieves, swindlers and cutthroats" is a major force in the society of Arvanneth—a New Orleans surviving thousands of years into the future of an Earth gripped by a new Ice age, in Poul Anderson's novel, The Winter of the World.
- The science-fiction series Babylon Five featured a thieves' guild in the made-for-TV movie Babylon 5: A Call to Arms.
- Mother Hitton's Littul Kittons by American writer Cordwainer Smith features the planet Viola Siderea – a robber planet, once rich and civilized, but now reduced to a dog-eat-dog existence and ruled by the Thieves' Guild, a ruling class of highly sophisticated thieves.

== Role playing games ==
- In Dungeons & Dragons, the Greyhawk supplement from 1976 adds thief characters and gives them the Master Thief title at the highest levels. The AD&D Players Handbook, published in 1978, specifically mentions thieves' guilds in the thief class description.
- In 1980, Gamelords published Thieves' Guild, a role-playing game system centered on thief characters which included rules on thieves' guilds.

== Video games ==
- The Elder Scrolls series of role-playing video games contains a prominent Thieves Guild. The Thieves' Guild appears in all installments of the game, from the first game, The Elder Scrolls: Arena to the present releases. The Thieves' Guild is a joinable faction in-game.
- Quest for Glory series has a Thieves' Guild that the player can join, and plays a major role in completing the game, depending on the player's career path.
- The Guild of Thieves, a computer game exclusively about a Thieves' Guild.
- The Assassin's Creed video game series features a Thieves' Guild.
- The "King of Thieves" video game created by ZeptoLab has thousands of Thieves' Guilds that the player can join.
- Thief Gold has a Thieves' Guild level.
- Featured to varying degrees in several installments of the Might & Magic series of computer games, but most conspicuously in Might and Magic VI: The Mandate of Heaven, where the High Priest of the Kingdom of Enroth does double-duty as head of a state-run Thieves' Guild with a very similar ethos and modus operandi to that in Ankh-Morpork as mentioned above.
- The MMORPG RuneScape features a thieves' guild.
- In Lands of Lore III, one of the joinable guilds is the Bacchanal, a guild of thieves.
- Arcanum: Of Steamworks and Magick Obscura has the Thieves Underground, which the player may join.
- In Lionheart: Legacy of the Crusader, the player may join either the thieves faction or the beggars faction.
- In Wizards & Warriors III: Kuros: Visions of Power, the player must join Thieves' Guild.

== See also ==
- Thief (character class)
- King of the Gypsies
