= The Little Man on the Subway =

- Short story by Isaac Asimov, Frederik Pohl
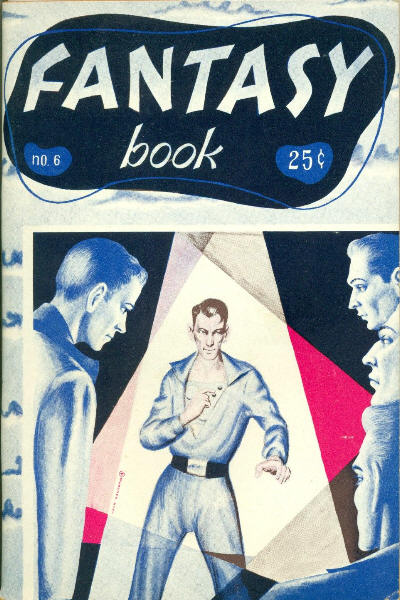
- Country: United States
- Language: English
- Genre: Fantasy

Publication
- Published in: Fantasy Book
- Publication type: Periodical
- Publisher: Fantasy Publishing Company, Inc.
- Media type: Print (Magazine, Hardback & Paperback)
- Publication date: 1950

Chronology
—	The Hazing

"The Little Man on the Subway" is a fantasy short story by Isaac Asimov and Frederik Pohl, originally published in the 1950 issue of Fantasy Book, and included in the 1972 collection The Early Asimov. It was initially written in 1941 by Asimov's friend, the author/agent/writer Frederik Pohl, under the pen name of James MacCreigh. Unable to get it right, Pohl asked Asimov to rewrite it, which he did. It was rejected by John W. Campbell and Asimov forgot about it. The story was finally sold to Fantasy Book in 1950.

== Plot summary ==
Patrick Cullen, a conductor on the New York City subway, is astonished when no one gets off his train as it reaches Flatbush, the end of the line. He's even more astonished when the train starts moving again and travels on via various non-existent stations. He meets a man who introduces himself as Mr Crumley, who says he's practicing to be a god and forthwith converts Cullen to believe in him.

Cullen meets other believers and also gets involved in a conspiracy to depose Crumley. In the end, Crumley is deposed and the train, with Cullen on board, re-enters the Flatbush station.

== Sources ==
- Asimov, Isaac, "The Little Man on the Subway" in The Early Asimov ISBN 0-385-03979-4.
