= The Nine Billion Names of God (film) =

- Theatrical release poster
- Directed by: Dominique Filhol
- Based on: The Nine Billion Names of God by Arthur C. Clarke
- Produced by: Fatna Elaidi, Dominique Filhol, Virginie Lancetti
- Starring: Paul Bandey, Rotem Jackman, Guéshé Lundup, Lennard Ridsdale, Yves Yan
- Cinematography: Athys de Galzain
- Edited by: Jean Philippe Ferré, Dominique Filhol
- Music by: Mark Yaeger
- Production company: Extermitent Production
- Distributed by: Next Film Distribution
- Release date: December 9, 2018 (Paris International Fantastic Film Festival)
- Running time: 14 min
- Country: France
- Languages: English, French

The Nine Billion Names of God is a 2018 French short film based on the 1953 short story of the same name by British writer Arthur C. Clarke. The film was selected for many international film festivals.

== Plot ==
For centuries, the monks of Sera Mey monastery in Tibet have been trying to discover all nine billion names of God, by calculating each and every possible combination of the letters in their alphabet. They believe that discovering the names is actually the ultimate purpose of the Universe. The monks calculate the godly names manually; however, in 1957, they decide to employ a modern technology to perform the task quicker. The monks send a messenger to New York City to meet with computer scientist Dr. Wagner and to rent a powerful IBM-like computer. Two American engineers, Georges and Chuck, have also been invited to visit the monastery to install and program the mainframe, so the monks can complete their mission. Once all the names are discovered and listed, the stars go out.

== Cast ==
- Paul Bandey as Dr. Wagner
- Rotem Jackman as Georges Hanley
- Lennard Ridsdale as Chuck
- Guéshé Lundup as Great Lama
- Yves Yan as Lama Dilgo

== See also ==
- Darren Aronofsky's 1998 film Pi, in which a powerful computer is used to divine the 216-character name of God.
- Names of God
