= Olhinto María Simoes =

Uruguayan poet, journalist and cultural worker

Olhinto María Simoes (1901–1966) was a Uruguayan poet, journalist and cultural worker. He was born in Rivera on June 5, 1901 and died on October 9, 1966.

== Career ==
María Simoes worked in the press from his youth, first as a printer and later as a journalist both in the local and national media. In 1922, at age 21, he founded the newspaper La Cachiporra.

Fundamentally he was a tireless worker for cultural activities in the belief that the culture of a people is not something that should only be transmitted, but something that is made and remade every day through creativity. He believed that strengthening the culture is the way to participate in the development of peoples.

In 1930 his Canto a la ciudad de Rivera (Song to the city of Rivera) took first prize in the competition organized by the Departmental Council of the Municipal Government, being later declared Hymn of the City.

As it relates to educational activities María Simoes participated on several school building committees, he was also founder and secretary for 13 years of the Association of Parents of High School Students. He also worked so that Rivera would have its own Normal Institute (Institute for teacher training). He supported the work of the Rivera French Alliance.

== Achievements ==
In 1936 Olhinto María Simoes founded the first Athenaeum of Rivera, which conducted extensive cultural activities, and he worked in it from the start. He put on drama pieces and also participated in theatre companies when they came to Montevideo to act in the Florencio Sánchez de Rivera theatre.

In 1950, he collected La Sombra de los Plátanos (The Shadow of Bananas) in a book - this poetic production has had several editions.

In 1956 he founded the School of Visual Arts Workshop of whose Steering Committee he was president until his death.

Years after his death, in 1976, Hojas sueltas was released with poetic productions that Simoes had not edited. Some of his poems have been put to music and recorded by several artists, including Héctor Numa Moraes.

On September 22, 1999, by Legal declaration, the name Olhinto María Simoes was given to School No. 147 in the city of Rivera.
