= The Science Fiction Hall of Fame, Volume One, 1929–1964 =

1970 anthology edited by Robert Silverberg

- First edition
- Editor: Robert Silverberg
- Language: English
- Genre: Science fiction
- Published: 1970
- Publisher: Doubleday

The Science Fiction Hall of Fame, Volume One, 1929–1964 is a 1970 anthology of English language science fiction short stories, edited by Robert Silverberg. Author Lester del Rey said that "it even lives up to its subtitle", referring to the volume's boast of containing "The Greatest Science-Fiction Stories of All Time".

It was first published by Doubleday and subsequently reprinted by Avon Books in July 1971 (Library of Congress Card Catalog Number: 70-97691; ISBN 0-380-00795-9), and later by Orb.

The book was first published in the UK in 1971 by Victor Gollancz Ltd and in paperback by First Sphere Books in 1972 (in two volumes, split after "First Contact").

The content of the book was decided by a vote of the members of the Science Fiction Writers of America, choosing among short stories (up to 15,000 words long) that predated the Nebula Awards. Among the top 15 vote-getters, one (Arthur C. Clarke's "The Star") was disqualified in order to prevent any writer from being represented twice; it was replaced by the 16th-place finisher ("Arena"), and the resulting list of 15 stories was included in the collection. Silverberg then used his judgment, rather than the strict vote count, in selecting 11 of the next 15, for a total of 26 stories.

In 1973, it was followed by The Science Fiction Hall of Fame, Volume Two: The Greatest Science Fiction Novellas of All Time. Further volumes were published, consisting of early Nebula winners, thus straying outside the original "pre-Nebula" concept.

== Contents ==
Author	Story Title	Year of first publication
Stanley G. Weinbaum	"A Martian Odyssey"	1934
John W. Campbell	"Twilight"	1934
Lester del Rey	"Helen O'Loy"	1938
Robert A. Heinlein	"The Roads Must Roll"	1940
Theodore Sturgeon	"Microcosmic God"	1941
Isaac Asimov	"Nightfall"	1941
A. E. van Vogt	"The Weapon Shop"	1942
Lewis Padgett	"Mimsy Were the Borogoves"	1943
Clifford D. Simak	"Huddling Place"	1944
Fredric Brown	"Arena"	1944
Murray Leinster	"First Contact"	1945
Judith Merril	"That Only a Mother"	1948
Cordwainer Smith	"Scanners Live in Vain"	1948
Ray Bradbury	"Mars Is Heaven!"	1948
Cyril M. Kornbluth	"The Little Black Bag"	1950
Richard Matheson	"Born of Man and Woman"	1950
Fritz Leiber	"Coming Attraction"	1950
Anthony Boucher	"The Quest for Saint Aquin"	1951
James Blish	"Surface Tension"	1952
Arthur C. Clarke	"The Nine Billion Names of God"	1953
Jerome Bixby	"It's a Good Life"	1953
Tom Godwin	"The Cold Equations"	1954
Alfred Bester	"Fondly Fahrenheit"	1954
Damon Knight	"The Country of the Kind"	1955
Daniel Keyes	"Flowers for Algernon"	1959
Roger Zelazny	"A Rose for Ecclesiastes"	1963

== Reception ==
Algis Budrys, finding the story selection inexact, concluded that "the book is as advertised – a basic one-volume library of the short science fiction story," but that "you should also leave space beside it."

== See also ==
- Nebula Award for Best Short Story
- The Science Fiction Hall of Fame, Volume Two
