= Atomsk (novel) =

1949 novel by Cordwainer Smith

- Cover of the first edition
- Author: Paul Linebarger
- Genre: Spy novel
- Published: 1949
- Publication place: United States
- Media type: Print

Atomsk, first published in 1949, is a Cold War spy novel by "Carmichael Smith", one of several pseudonyms used by the American writer Paul Linebarger, who wrote fiction most prolifically as Cordwainer Smith.

== Plot ==
Drawing on Linebarger's own expertise in the field of psychological warfare, the book is a study of the personality of a U.S. operative, Major Michael Dugan, who has little in common with James Bond except his extreme resourcefulness undercover and when in danger. A man of multiple identities who sees himself to some extent as a blank sheet, he goes from calling himself "Comrade Nobody" to saying "I'm anybody". The novel also contains an underlying, through devious and ambiguous, message of peace. As one character says, learning to like people is "the only way to win wars, or even better, to get out of them".

== Publication history ==
Written two years after Winston Churchill's Sinews of Peace address, Atomsk was the first espionage novel of the Cold War, inaugurating a genre exemplified by writers such as Ian Fleming and John Le Carré.

Linebarger's third published novel, Atomsk has long been out of print. Paper copies regularly cost hundreds of U.S. dollars in the second-hand market, even though the novel is also available as an inexpensive e-book.
