= Mother Hitton's Littul Kittons =

1961 short story by Cordwainer Smith

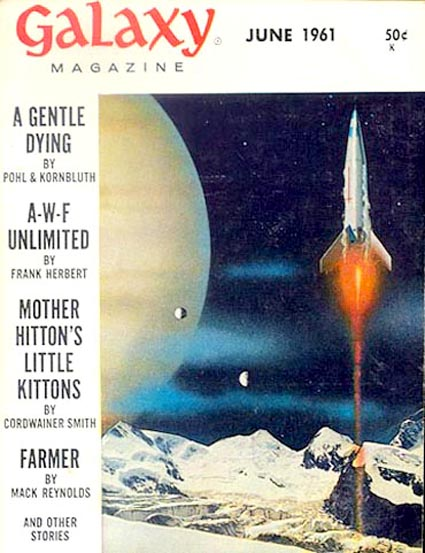
The story "Mother Hitton's Littul Kittons" was originally published in the June 1961 issue of Galaxy Science Fiction

"Mother Hitton's Littul Kittons" is a classic science fiction short story by American writer Cordwainer Smith, first published in Galaxy Magazine in 1961 and based partly on the folk tale Ali Baba and the Forty Thieves. It was collected most recently in the book The Rediscovery of Man. The story details the methods by which the Norstrilians (or "Old North Australians") of Smith's fictional "Instrumentality of Mankind" universe maintain their monopoly on the valuable immortality drug stroon. The story details part of the background for the novel Norstrilia, which references the Kittons in its introduction as a method for certain death.

The story was alluded to in Charles Stross's novel Glasshouse.

Cordwainer Smith is a pseudonym of Paul Linebarger, the noted China expert, who wrote most of his published science-fiction stories within the setting of the Instrumentality of Mankind.

== Story ==
The story is set approximately 15,000 years in the future. For many millennia, after a nuclear holocaust on Earth (now referred to as "Manhome"), mankind has been governed by the Instrumentality of Mankind, an absolute aristocratic oligarchy. The most valuable substance in the universe is an immortality drug called "santaclara" or "stroon," produced exclusively on the planet Norstrilia.

Norstrilia ("Old North Australia") was settled by refugee sheep farmers from a post-nuclear holocaust Australia; although currently rich beyond imagining, their journey to Norstrilia was difficult and included a stay on the hell-world "Paradise VII." The Norstrilian political system is a nominal monarchy with "her absent majesty," the Queen, as head of state. However, as the Queen has been lost for millennia ("But she might bloody well turn up one of these days."), a local deputy and Commonwealth Council govern. The municipal organization of the planet is based on ranches, similar to plantations or cattle stations: large farm allotments passed down through generations.

The sheep that the Australian immigrants brought to Nostrilia mutated; the mutated sheep grow larger than houses, are completely immobile, require constant attention, and produce a virus that can be refined into stroon, which halts aging in humans. Stroon has made Norstrilia the richest planet in the entire Instrumentality. Norstrilians are thus targets of kidnap and theft attempts. The citizens are highly trained in self-defense, and the planet itself is guarded by a mysterious "outer defense."

Viola Siderea is formerly rich and civilized planet, but after an economic collapse is now ruled a highly sophisticated Thieves' Guild. Benjacomin Bozart, a Senior Warden of the Guild, has trained for centuries to raid Norstrilia for its stroon. Due to the impossibility of overpowering a Norstrilian adult, he drugs and kills a small Norstrilian boy on a vacation world to discover the exact nature of the planet's outer defense, but the only information he gets is the name "Mother Hitton's Littul Kittons" scrawled in the sand on the beach.

He consults a public encyclopedia, unaware that searching for the term "Littul Kittons" acts as a tripwire, alerting the Norstrilian defenses to potential hostile activity. Later, he consults the Guild's private encyclopedia, which says that the phrase is an archaic term for the disease caused by the stroon virus – unbeknownst to the Guild, this a fictitious entry previously planted by a Norstrilian agent. Now confident of somehow obtaining stroon, Bozart pays out immense bribes using Viola Siderea's credit to illicitly charter ships, further unaware that he is paying other Norstrilian agents who have tracked him since he murdered the child. The last leg of the journey drops his space yacht into orbit around Norstrilia.

A 21-faceted moon and a network of relay stations orbit the planet. They are the armament of Mother Hitton, the "weapons mistress" in charge of the care and feeding of the "Littul Kittons": mink which have been selectively bred for psychotic, self-destructive madness. The brain patterns of these minks are focused into a telepathic beam that can be directed at any incoming space ship from the relay station, driving all humans into suicidal psychosis. Bozart dies horribly.

After his death, the extent of the Norstrilians' revenge is revealed: Bozart's bribes have incurred a debt of 400 million man-megayears for Viola Siderea.
