= The Crime and the Glory of Commander Suzdal =

1964 short story by Cordwainer Smith

"The Crime and the Glory of Commander Suzdal" is a science fiction short story by Cordwainer Smith, set in Smith's "Instrumentality of Mankind" universe. It was first published in Amazing Stories in May 1964, and it is included in The Rediscovery of Man collection.

== Plot ==
Commander Suzdal is a captain of "The Navy and the Instrumentality" sent on a "one man" mission of exploration (in actuality he is accompanied by several generations of "Turtle-People"). He hibernates in cryogenic sleep while long-lived turtle underpeople run the ship, until the need for a "true human" arises.

A deep space probe is found. It tells a brilliantly conceived but mostly false story about the plight of a group of settlers calling themselves the Arachosians. Suzdal is deceived and turns his ship towards the planet Arachosia and reenters hibernation.

When he arrives he learns the horrible truth. The original settlers nearly became extinct, succumbing to a plague that (in Smith's words) rendered "femininity carcinogenic." They were only able to save their women by chemically (and later genetically) making them male. However, the resulting society is deeply unbalanced by the lack of females and ordinary family structure. The Arachosians, not truly male or female and calling themselves "klopts", realize on an instinctive level what they are missing and as a result, hate normal human beings with unbridled fervor and regard them as abominations to be destroyed (even though they have not seen one in many generations). To carry out this plan, they have dispatched traps in the form of messages, such as the one Suzdal encountered, throughout the galaxy.

When Suzdal wakes up, the Arachosians are already crawling over the outside of his ship. On the advice of an artificial security officer, he uses an emergency device intended to send his large spacecraft back a few seconds in time to instead hurl feline genetic material (coded to evolve for intelligence and to obey Suzdal) millions of years back on the far side of the local moon. A race of advanced, space-faring cat-descendants appears instantaneously and hail Suzdal as their god and creator. They engage the Arachosians at his order, allowing him to escape.

Despite saving the ship and successfully concealing Earth's location from the Arachosians, Suzdal is stripped of rank, name, life and finally death, finding himself sentenced to the prison planet Shayol for his misuse of the time device. He is later seen in the story "A Planet Named Shayol". Meanwhile the Instrumentality officially declares all accounts of his story to be lies, including the text at hand.

== Reception ==
Thomas Clareson has described "Commander Suzdal" as "more parable than story", while Eliot Borenstein considers it "an oblique cautionary tale about men's attempts to manage without women".

Rich Horton, writing for Black Gate magazine, calls the story "odd", "decidedly weird", and "disquieting", comparing the Arachosians disfavorably to the all-male society in Lois McMaster Bujold's novel Ethan of Athos; but he conceded that it has "some of the incantatory power Smith always strove for". Paul Kincaid, at the online SF Site magazine, described it as a story about the human "capacity to become monsters when we follow someone who is 'brilliant, remorseless, implacable'"; he compared the Arachosians' broadcast lure to Tokyo Rose.
