= Quest of the Three Worlds =

Science fantasy novel

Quest of the Three Worlds is a collection of four science fiction stories by American writer Cordwainer Smith, published in 1966.

== Plot summary ==
Quest of the Three Worlds is a set of four stories featuring Casher O'Neill.

== Reception ==
Dave Langford reviewed Quest of the Three Worlds for White Dwarf magazine (issue #99). He wrote that "In their far-out, mystical way, these aren't the most accessible of Smith's many linked stories: a tasty sample, though."

== Reviews ==
- Review by J. Cawthorn (1967) in New Worlds, January 1967
- Review by P. Schuyler Miller (1967) in Analog Science Fiction and Science Fact, June 1967
- Review by Lee Weinstein (1979) in Science Fiction Review, November 1979
- Review by Baird Searles (1986) in Isaac Asimov's Science Fiction Magazine, August 1986
- Review by Andy Sawyer (1990) in Paperback Inferno, #83
- Review by Bruce Gillespie (1991) in SF Commentary, #69/70
