= Think Blue, Count Two =

1963 short story by Cordwainer Smith

"Think Blue, Count Two" is a science fiction short story by Cordwainer Smith, set in his Instrumentality of Mankind future history. The story revolves around a psychological trip wire that is installed to prevent an atrocity on a sleeper ship (a hypothetical type of crewed spacecraft).

Originally published in Galaxy Magazine in February 1963, the story was awarded the 1990 Japanese Seiun Award for Best Foreign Language Short Story of the Year.

== Plot ==
In a spaceport on Earth, two technicians prepare passengers for a centuries long interstellar journey, placing them in suspended animation. Their destination planet Wereld Schemering is "running dreadfully ugly", so the thirty-thousand passengers are all handsome or beautiful. This includes "the most beautiful girl on earth", a fifteen-year-old named Veesey-koosey. Veesey is designated a reserve passenger, to be awoken in case of an emergency. She has no skills and is naive, but her abnormally high "daughter potential" means other reserves will desire to protect her, and thus, themselves.

The technicians grimly recall Old Twenty-two, a ship whose reserve passengers awoke mid-journey and, alone in space, "invented new crimes and committed them upon each other". Fearing for Veesey's safety, the technicians call in specialist Tiga-belas, who psychically connects to with a "psychological guard"—a black cube-shaped computer, powered by the laminated brain of a mouse.

326 years later, Veesey is awoken by fellow passengers Trece, a handsome older man, and Talatashar, a man whose face was partially deformed while freezing. The ship is stalled after their sailor died of a blood clot, and the solar sail was damaged. The three work for a year to repair the ship. Talatashar gradually goes mad from isolation, and grows resentful toward Trece and Veesey. One day, he restrains Trece, and threatens to rape and murder Veesey while he watches.

Veesey activates her cube by recalling the codephrase:

Lady if a man
Tries to bother you, you can
Think blue,
Count two,
And look for a red shoe.

It projects vivid shared hallucinations, including a warden, Talatashar's mother, a friend for Veesey, and a captain, who deescalate the situation, and help them resume travel.

Safely on Wereld Schemering, Talatashar apologizes to Veesey, and thanks her for rescuing them. The two remain friends.

== Legacy ==
The story's title is referenced in the 1998 anime series Serial Experiments Lain. In the series, Lain's father uses the password "Think Bule Count One Tow" [sic].
