= The Game of Rat and Dragon =

1955 short story by Cordwainer Smith

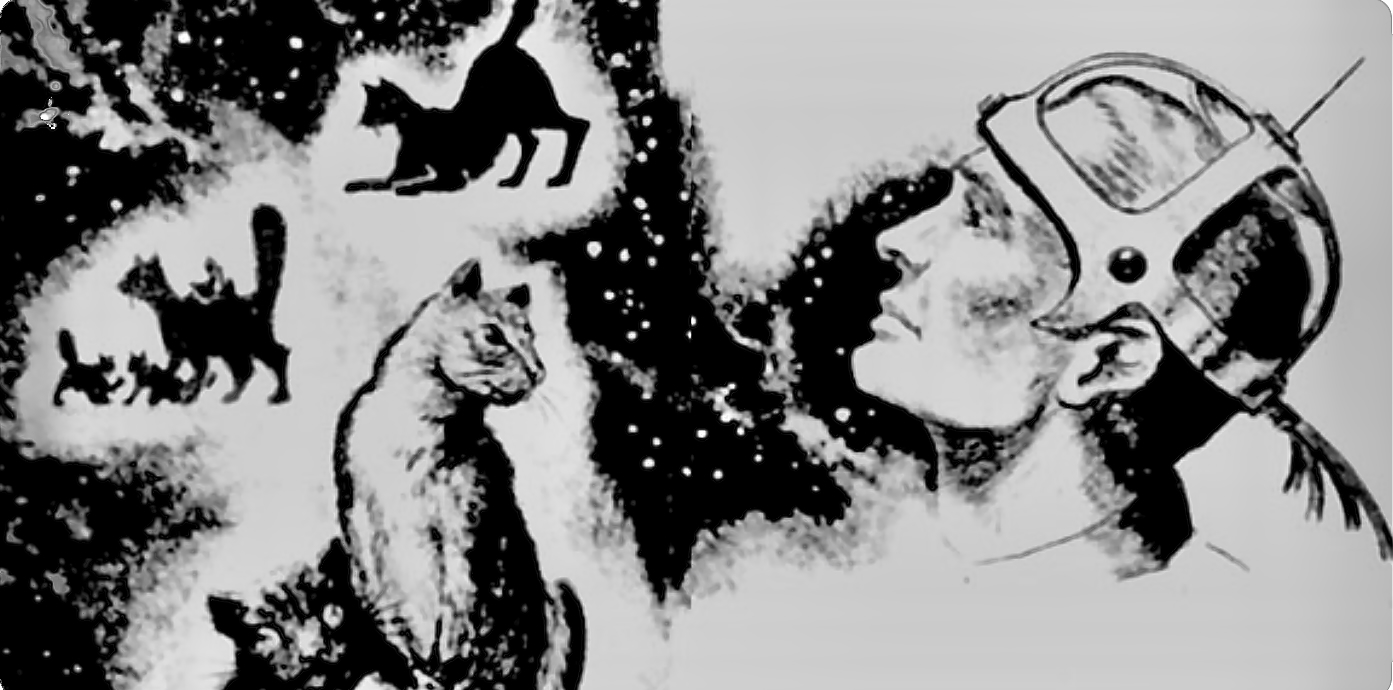
Illustration from Galaxy Science Fiction, October 1955.

"The Game of Rat and Dragon" is a science fiction short story by American author Cordwainer Smith. It was written in 1954 and published in Galaxy Science Fiction magazine in 1955. The story is set in the far future, though no date is given. It occurs in the same universe as most of Smith's works, with a passing reference to the supremely powerful government known as the Instrumentality of Mankind.

The "dragons" in the story are mysterious aliens that attack human starships and drive the inhabitants insane. Cats guided by telepaths are used to fight these dragons, because of the cats' fast reactions. The cats see the aliens as giant rats—hence the story's title. The human telepaths form strong bonds with these cats, seeing them as almost human. Non-telepaths sometimes mock the telepaths for this bonding.

== Plot summary ==
Human travel in outer space is threatened by strange creatures known as the Dragons. Imperceptible to ordinary people, Dragons can only be experienced as a sudden death or insanity. They are also only destroyed by very strong light, but they move too fast for conventional defense methods. Telepathic humans and telepathic cats (who perceive the dragons as rats) are able to sense the creatures within milliseconds. The humans and cats work together as teams to protect interstellar spaceships traveling via planoforming (a type of faster than light speed travel). The cats ride outside of the spaceships in their own tiny crafts, waiting for the order from their human partner to attack. Pin-sets (telepathic amplifiers) heighten a telepath's senses and allow the humans to communicate with their partner cats. The cats then destroy the Dragons with "pinlights", miniature nuclear bombs whose blast gives off pure visible radiance. Thanks to the combination of the human mind and the cats' quick reactions, the battle against the Dragons is not only possible, but usually ends in victory.

Underhill, Woodley, Father Moontree, and a girl named West are the group of telepaths currently fighting the war. The cats fighting alongside them are Captain Wow, Lady May and others. Woodley draws an unremarkable cat, West teams up with Captain Wow, Underhill with Lady May, and Father Moontree gets stuck with an old, unnamed, greedy male cat, who has the best fighting record of them all. While Father Moontree and Woodley are not particularly interested in their partner cats, West thinks Captain Wow is cuddly and Underhill has a strong connection with Lady May. He enjoys being telepathically linked with her, and she with him.

The team travel to the depths of space, searching for their enemy. During an attack, Underhill is unable to follow Lady May's thoughts fast enough and the Dragon touches his mind, sending excruciating pain throughout his body. The battle lasts less than the blink of an eye, and the ship lands safely. Underhill is hospitalized and a doctor tells him that he was within a tenth of a millisecond of going insane, but the only thing that concerns Underhill is his partner, Lady May, and her well-being. A secretly jealous and angry nurse walks in and Underhill compares her to Lady May. Logically, he understands that Lady May is only a cat, but he knows that in truth no woman will ever equal her.

== Reception ==
"The Game of Rat and Dragon" was nominated for the 1956 Hugo Award for Best Short Story.

== Sources ==
- Hartwell, David G., and Kathryn Cramer. The Space Opera Renaissance. New York: Orb Books, 2007.
