= A Planet Named Shayol =

1961 short story by Cordwainer Smith

- Short story by Cordwainer Smith
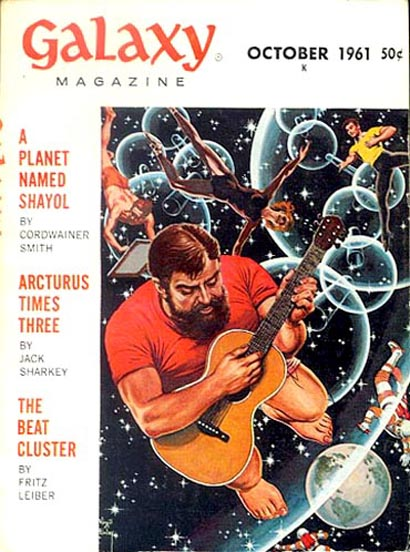
- Country: USA
- Language: English
- Genre: Science fiction

Publication
- Published in: Galaxy Science Fiction
- Publication type: Periodical
- Publisher: World Editions
- Media type: Print (magazine)
- Publication date: October 1961

Chronology
- Series: Instrumentality of Mankind
Norstrilia	Quest of the Three Worlds

"A Planet Named Shayol" is a science fiction story by American writer Cordwainer Smith (the pen name of Paul Linebarger). Like most of his science fiction, it takes place in his Instrumentality of Mankind universe. The story was first published in Galaxy Science Fiction magazine in October 1961.

== In other media ==
=== Audio ===
The story was adapted for radio by the Australian Broadcasting Corporation and broadcast in 1986.

== Plot summary ==
The protagonist, Mercer, who lives within the Empire, has been convicted of "a crime that has no name". He is condemned by the Empire to the planet Shayol, where he lives in a penal colony whose inhabitants must undergo grotesque physical mutations caused by tiny symbiotes called dromozoans. Most grow extra organs, which the Empire harvests for medical purposes. The bull-man B'dikkat administers the prisoners a drug called super-condamine that alleviates the pain of their punishment and various surgeries, this is lethal to those who have not been exposed to the dromozoans.

More than a century passes. Mercer has found a soulmate in Lady Da the dowager empress. B'dikkat shows the couple a sight that horrifies him: children have been sent to Shayol—alive, though with their brains removed. Lady Da knows how to contact the Lords of the Instrumentality so that they can intervene. When the Lords arrive on Shayol, they are shocked by what they find. Moreover, the children are the heirs to the Imperial throne: apparently, the Imperium has become so bureaucratic and corrupt that it condemned them to prevent them from committing treason when they matured.

The Instrumentality revokes the permission that allowed the Empire to exist and to maintain Shayol. They will free those prisoners who are still sentient and provide a cure for their suffering with a substitute for the super-condamine, namely an electronic "cap" which stimulates the brain's pleasure center. The mindless prisoners will be decapitated, their heads "taken away and killed as pleasantly as we can manage, probably by an overdosage of super-condamine", leaving the bodies to be used by the dromozoa. Ultimately, Lady Da claims Mercer as her consort.

Commander Suzdal appeared in "The Crime and the Glory of Commander Suzdal", a story set earlier in fictional history than this one. It apparently takes place in the Bright Empire from other of the Instrumentality works.
