= The Ballad of Lost C'Mell =

1962 short story by Cordwainer Smith

- Short story by Cordwainer Smith
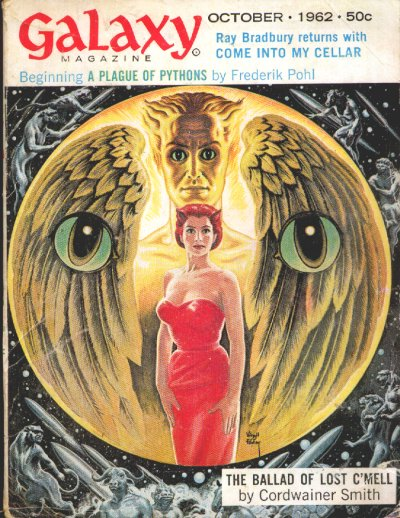
- Country: USA
- Language: English
- Genre: Science fiction

Publication
- Published in: Galaxy Magazine
- Publication type: Print (Magazine, Hardback & Paperback)
- Publisher: Galaxy Publishing
- Publication date: October 1962

Chronology
- Series: Instrumentality of Mankind
Alpha Ralpha Boulevard	Norstrilia

"The Ballad of Lost C'Mell" is a science fiction novella by the American writer Cordwainer Smith (pen name of Paul Linebarger, 1913–1966). It was first published in October 1962 in Galaxy Magazine and has since been reprinted in several compilations and omnibus editions.

The novella's main characters are Jestocost, a lord of the Instrumentality of Mankind, and C'mell, a beautiful cat-derived "underperson" who works as a "girly-girl" (like an escort) at Earth's main spaceport. In Smith's fiction, an underperson is an animal given human speech and form, but no rights, while retaining some of its inherent genetics—for example, C'mell's father held the long-jump record during the time of the story.

== Plot summary ==
The story revolves around Jestocost's ambition to help the oppressed underpeople gain rights without upsetting the established social order. While debating how to make contact, Jestocost telepathically accesses C'mell's thoughts during the funeral of her athlete father, and overhears her call for help to someone named E-telly-kelly. After awkwardly questioning her later (which she at first mistakes for a crude pass), he is permitted to make contact with the E'telekeli, an eagle-derived underperson unknown to the Instrumentality with immense telepathic powers, who may be the leader of the underpeople.

Jestocost and the E'telekeli agree to a scheme in which C'mell will pretend to be a witness to illegal smuggling. When this case is brought before the assembled Lords of the Instrumentality, C'mell provides manufactured evidence which causes the Instrumentality's computer system, the Bank, to display probable smuggling routes and hideouts on the Bell, the Bank's three-dimensional display system. While this is going on, C'mell remains surreptitiously in physical contact with Jestocost. This allows him to telepathically relay the images on the Bell to the E'telekeli. The images appear too quickly for a normal human mind to interpret, but the E'telekeli is able to do so.

Since C'mell's "evidence" proves worthless the Lords dismiss her angrily, but the information stolen from the Bank and Bell provides the underpeople with details about the main human checkpoints and a list of safe havens where they can hide from the Instrumentality while seeking rights.

Their plan has required C'mell and Jestocost to work closely together, and C'mell (working for the first time with a human who respects her intelligence) falls in love with Jestocost, but he suppresses his own feelings as a distraction, and they separate when the plan succeeds. They only meet again once, many years later when the underpeople are well on their way to achieving their rights. Their discussion is friendly, but C'mell is privately saddened by Jestocost's lack of romantic feeling toward her.

Ultimately, during Jestocost's life, underpeople achieve a lower-grade citizenship, for which their efforts were partly responsible. The story of Jestocost and C'mell never becomes public, but a folk song among the underpeople entitled "The Ballad of Lost C'mell" tells a poetic and partial version of the events.

On his deathbed, many years after C'mell has died of old age, Jestocost has a brief telepathic conversation, apparently with the E'telekeli's successor, in which he learns that she never loved anyone but him. The telepathic underperson assures Jestocost that his name will be linked with C'mell's forever in history and folklore.

== Connections with other works ==
Smith's novel Norstrilia is partly a sequel to "The Ballad of Lost C'Mell". The novel is set a few years after the main part of the novella; includes all of the main characters; and is concerned with some of the same issues. C'mell also appears in Smith's story "Alpha Ralpha Boulevard", which takes place earlier in terms of chronology and publication order.

C'mell's adventures take place during the early years of the Rediscovery of Man period. According to J. J. Pierce's conjectural timeline of the Instrumentality of Mankind (included in We, the Underpeople and other collections of Smith's stories), this period seems to be sometime between AD 15,000 and 16,000.

"The Ballad of Lost C'Mell" was included in The Science Fiction Hall of Fame, Volume Two, a collection of the 22 best science fiction novellas published before the introduction of the Nebula Awards in 1965, as selected by the Science Fiction and Fantasy Writers of America.

The name "C'mell" is derived from that of Smith's pet cat, Melanie. As an aside, the 'M' of the name C'mell is often capitalized in the title of this novella, but in the text it remains uncapitalized.

The novella's title was not the one that Smith originally proposed, but it was derived from the text by Galaxy magazine's editor Frederik Pohl. This was one of several of Smith's proposed titles that Pohl changed for publication, because he disliked the originals. Pohl's new titles are all derived from the texts of the stories, in order to retain the character of Smith's writing.
