= Cordwainer Smith =

American science fiction writer (1913–1966)

- Smith, c. early 1960s
- Born: Paul Myron Anthony Linebarger; July 11, 1913; Milwaukee, Wisconsin, U.S.
- Died: August 6, 1966 (aged 53); Baltimore, Maryland, U.S.
- Education: Johns Hopkins University (PhD, 1936)
- Occupations: Writer; professor; military officer
- Spouse(s): Margaret Snow; Genevieve Collins
- Relatives: Sun Yat-sen (godfather)
- Writing career
- Period: 1937–1965
- Genre: Science fiction
- Subjects: East Asia political science, psychological warfare
- Notable works: "Scanners Live in Vain"; Psychological Warfare

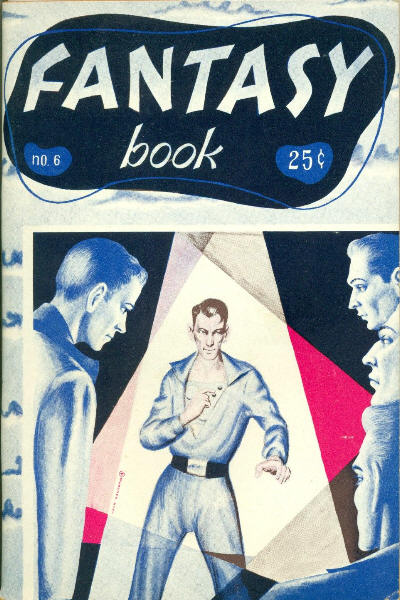
Smith's first professionally published science fiction story, "Scanners Live in Vain", originally appeared in Fantasy Book magazine in 1950.

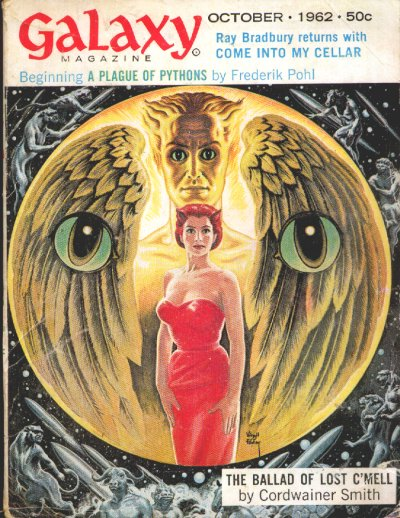
Smith's novelette "The Ballad of Lost C'Mell" was the cover story in the October 1962 issue of Galaxy Science Fiction magazine. Artwork by Virgil Finlay.

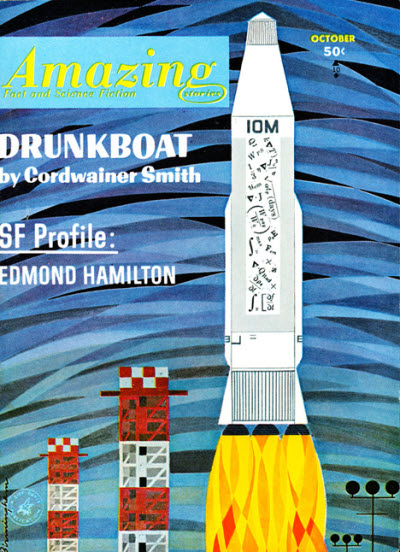
Smith's novelette "Drunkboat" was on the cover of the October 1963 issue of Amazing Stories magazine. Art by Lloyd Birmingham.

Paul Myron Anthony Linebarger (July 11, 1913 – August 6, 1966), known by his pen-name Cordwainer Smith, was an American author of science fiction. He was an officer in the US Army, a scholar of East Asia, and an expert in psychological warfare. He was one of science fiction's more influential authors despite his relatively limited output and his early death at the age of 53.

== Biography ==
=== Early life and education ===
Linebarger's father, Paul Myron Wentworth Linebarger, was a lawyer, working as a judge in the Philippines. There he met Chinese nationalist Sun Yat-sen to whom he became an advisor. Linebarger's father sent his wife to give birth in Milwaukee, Wisconsin, so that their child would be eligible to become president of the United States. Sun Yat-sen, who was considered the father of Chinese nationalism, became Linebarger's godfather.

His childhood was unsettled as his father moved the family to a succession of places in Asia, Europe, and the United States. He was sometimes sent to boarding schools for safety. In all, Linebarger attended more than 30 schools. In 1919, while at a boarding school in Hawaii, he was blinded in his right eye, which was replaced by a glass eye. The vision in his remaining eye was impaired by infection.

Linebarger was familiar with English, German, and Chinese by adulthood. At the age of 23, he received a PhD in political science from Johns Hopkins University.

=== Career ===
From 1937 to 1946, Linebarger held a faculty appointment at Duke University, where he began producing highly regarded works on Far Eastern affairs.

While retaining his professorship at Duke after the beginning of World War II, Linebarger began serving as a second lieutenant of the United States Army, where he was involved in the creation of the Office of War Information and the Operation Planning and Intelligence Board. He also helped to organize the army's first psychological warfare section. In 1943, he was sent to China to coordinate military intelligence operations. When he later pursued his interest in China, Linebarger became a close confidant of Chiang Kai-shek. By the end of the war, he had risen to the rank of major. In 1947, Linebarger moved to the Johns Hopkins University's School of Advanced International Studies in Washington, DC, where he served as Professor of Asiatic Studies. He used his experiences in the war to write the book Psychological Warfare (1948), regarded by many in the field as a classic text.

Linebarger eventually rose to the rank of colonel in the reserves. He was recalled to advise the British forces during the Malayan Emergency and the U.S. Eighth Army during the Korean War. Though he sometimes called himself a "visitor to small wars", he refrained from becoming involved in the Vietnam War, but he did some work for the Central Intelligence Agency (CIA). In 1969, CIA officer Miles Copeland Jr. wrote that Linebarger was "perhaps the leading practitioner of 'black' and 'gray' propaganda in the Western world". According to Joseph Burkholder Smith, a former CIA operative, Linebarger conducted classes in psychological warfare for CIA agents at his home in Washington, under cover of his position at Johns Hopkins University. He traveled extensively and became a member of the Foreign Policy Association, and he was called upon to advise President John F. Kennedy.

In April 2026, Linebarger was posthumously inducted as a Distinguished Member of the Psychological Operations Regiment (DMOR) by the United States Army John F. Kennedy Special Warfare Center and School, recognizing his contributions to the development of psychological warfare and the early institutional framework of U.S. Army psychological operations.

=== Marriage and family ===
In 1936, Linebarger married Margaret Snow. They had a daughter in 1942 and another in 1947. They divorced in 1949.

In 1950, Linebarger married his second wife Genevieve Collins; they had no children. They remained married until his death from a heart attack in 1966; he died at Johns Hopkins University Medical Center in Baltimore, Maryland, at the age of 53. Linebarger had expressed a wish to retire to Australia, which he had visited while traveling. He is buried in Arlington National Cemetery, Section 35, Grave Number 4712. His widow, Genevieve Collins Linebarger, was interred with him on November 16, 1981.

== "Kirk Allen" debate ==
Linebarger is rumored to have been Kirk Allen, the pseudonymous patient of psychologist Robert M. Lindner whose case was featured in a chapter of Lindner's 1954 book The Fifty-Minute Hour. Allen was described as a college educated man who worked for the United States military and imagined himself as the protagonist of an elaborately detailed science fictional world.

According to Cordwainer Smith scholar Alan C. Elms, this speculation first reached print in Brian Aldiss's 1973 science fiction history Billion Year Spree; Aldiss, in turn, claimed to have received the information from science fiction fan and scholar Leon Stover. More recently, both Elms and librarian Lee Weinstein have gathered circumstantial evidence to support their case for Linebarger's being Allen, but both concede there is no direct proof that Linebarger was ever a patient of Lindner's or that he suffered from a disorder similar to that of Kirk Allen. Other investigators have proposed that Allen was someone other than Linebarger.

== Literary style ==
Frederik Pohl commented on the imaginary universe of Linebarger's fiction:

In his stories, which were a wonderful and inimitable blend of a strange, raucous poetry and a detailed technological scene, we begin to read of human beings in worlds so far from our own in space in time that they were no longer quite Earth (even when they were the third planet out from Sol), and the people were no longer quite human, but something perhaps better, certainly different.

Linebarger's identity as "Cordwainer Smith" was a secret until his death. Cordwainer is an archaic word for "a worker in cordwain or cordovan leather; a shoemaker", and a smith is "one who works in iron or other metals; esp. a blacksmith or farrier"; these are two kinds of skilled workers using traditional materials. Linebarger also used the literary pseudonyms "Carmichael Smith" (for the political thriller Atomsk), "Anthony Bearden" (for poetry) and "Felix C. Forrest" (for the novels Ria and Carola).

Some of Smith's stories are written in a narrative style closer to traditional Chinese stories than to most English-language fiction, and reminiscent of the Genji tales by the Japanese writer Lady Murasaki. His total science fiction output is relatively small, because of his time-consuming profession and his early death.

Smith's works consist of two parts:

- A novel, originally published in two volumes in edited form as The Planet Buyer, also known as The Boy Who Bought Old Earth (1964), and The Underpeople (1968); the novel was later restored to its original form as Norstrilia (1975)
- 32 short stories collected in The Rediscovery of Man (1993), including two versions of the short story "War No. 81-Q"

Linebarger's cultural links with China are partially expressed by the pseudonym Felix C. Forrest, which he used in addition to Cordwainer Smith. His godfather Sun Yat-Sen suggested that Linebarger adopt the Chinese name Lin Bai-lo (simplified Chinese: 林白乐; traditional Chinese: 林白樂; pinyin: Lín Báilè), which may be roughly translated as "Forest of Incandescent Bliss"; felix is Latin for "happy". In later years, Linebarger proudly wore a tie with the Chinese characters for this name embroidered on it.

An expert in psychological warfare, Linebarger was fascinated by the newly developing fields of psychology and psychiatry. He used many concepts from these fields in his fiction, which often contains religious overtones or motifs, particularly with characters who have no control over their actions. James B. Jordan argued for the importance of Anglicanism in Smith's work dating back to 1949. But Linebarger's daughter Rosana Hart has indicated that he did not become Anglican until 1950 and was not strongly interested in religion until later. In his introduction to the collection The Rediscovery of Man, James. A. Mann notes that Linebarger became more devout starting around 1960 and expressed this change in his writing. Linebarger's works are sometimes included in analyses of Christianity in fiction, along with the works of authors such as C. S. Lewis and J.R.R. Tolkien.

Most of Smith's stories are set in the distant future, between 4,000 and 14,000 years after the twentieth century. In this future, after the Ancient Wars devastate Earth, humans—ruled by the Instrumentality of Mankind—rebuild and expand to the stars in the Second Age of Space (around 6000 AD). Over the next few thousand years, humanity spreads to thousands of worlds, and human life becomes safe but sterile, as robots and the animal-derived Underpeople take over many human jobs, and humans themselves are genetically programmed as embryos to perform specified duties. Toward the end of this period, the Instrumentality attempts to revive old cultures and languages in a process known as the Rediscovery of Man, where humans emerge from their mundane utopia and Underpeople are liberated from slavery.

For years, Linebarger kept a pocket notebook that he filled with ideas about the Instrumentality and additional stories for the series. But while in a small boat on a lake or bay during the mid-1960s, he leaned over the side, and the notebook fell out of his breast pocket into the water, where it was permanently lost. Another story claims that he accidentally left the notebook in a restaurant in Rhodes in 1965. With the notebook gone, he felt empty of ideas, so he decided to start a new series that was an allegory of Middle Eastern politics.

Smith's stories describe a long future history of Earth. One setting is a postapocalyptic landscape with walled cities, defended by agents of the Instrumentality; another setting is a sterile utopia, in which freedom can be found only far below the surface of the planet, in long-forgotten and buried anthropogenic strata. These features may place Smith's works within the Dying Earth subgenre of science fiction, but his stories are ultimately more optimistic and distinctive.

Smith's most celebrated short story is the first one that he published, "Scanners Live in Vain"; this led many of its earliest readers to assume that Cordwainer Smith was a new pen name for an established giant of the genre. It was selected as one of the best science fiction short stories of the pre-Nebula Award period by the Science Fiction and Fantasy Writers of America, appearing in The Science Fiction Hall of Fame Volume One, 1929-1964. "The Ballad of Lost C'Mell" was similarly honored, appearing in The Science Fiction Hall of Fame, Volume Two.

After "Scanners Live in Vain", Smith's next story did not appear for several years; but from 1955 until his death in 1966, his stories appeared regularly, most often in Galaxy Science Fiction. His universe featured creations such as the following:

- The planet Norstrilia (Old North Australia), a semi-arid planet where an immortality drug called stroon is harvested from gigantic, virus-infected sheep, each weighing more than 100 tons. Norstrilians are nominally the galaxy's richest people, and they defend their immensely valuable stroon with sophisticated weapons (in the story "Mother Hitton's Littul Kittons"). However, extremely high taxes ensure that all Norstrilians live frugal rural lives, like the farmers of old Australia, to keep the residents tough.
- The punishment world Shayol (cf. Sheol), where criminals are punished by the regrowth and harvesting of their organs for transplanting.
- Planoforming spacecraft, which are crewed by humans telepathically linked with cats to defend against attacks by malevolent entities in space, which are perceived by humans as dragons and by cats as gigantic rats (in the story "The Game of Rat and Dragon").
- The Underpeople, animals modified into human form and intelligence, fill service roles and are treated as property. Several stories feature clandestine efforts to liberate the Underpeople and grant them civil rights. They are seen throughout regions controlled by the Instrumentality. An Underperson's name starts with a one-letter prefix that is based on their animal species. Thus C'Mell (in "The Ballad of Lost C'Mell") is derived from cats; D'Joan (in "The Dead Lady of Clown Town"), a character recalling Joan of Arc, is descended from dogs; and B'dikkat (in "A Planet Named Shayol") has bovine ancestry.
- Habermans and their supervisors, Scanners, who are essential for space travel—but at the cost of having their sensory nerves cut to block the "pain of space", and who perceive the world only through vision and various life-support implants. A technological breakthrough removes the need for this treatment, but resistance among the Scanners to their perceived loss of status ensues, forming the basis of the story "Scanners Live in Vain".
- Neologisms from works early in the timeline are not explained to any great extent, but they serve to create an atmosphere of strangeness. These words are usually derived from languages other than English. For instance, the term manshonyagger derives from two German words—menschen (meaning "men" or "mankind") and jäger (meaning a hunter)—and refers to war machines that roam the wild lands between walled cities and prey on men, except for those that can be identified as Germans. Another example is Meeya Meefla, the only city to have preserved its name from the pre-atomic era; this is evidently Miami, Florida, from the abbreviated form "Miami Fla" (as shown on road signs).
- Character names in the stories are often derived from non-English languages. Smith seemed particularly fond of using numbers for this purpose.
  - For instance, the name of the Lord Sto Odin in the story "Under Old Earth" is derived from the Russian words for 'One hundred and one', сто один; the name also recalls the Norse god Odin.
  - Several of the names mean 'five-six' in different languages, as follows: the robot Fisi (fi[ve]-si[x]); the dead Lady Panc Ashash (in Sanskrit pañcha [पञ्च] is 'five' and ṣaṣ [षष्] is 'six'); Limaono (lima-ono in Hawaiian and/or Fijian); Englok (ng^{5}-luk^{6} [五-六] in Cantonese); Goroke (go-roku [五-六] Japanese); Femtiosex ('fifty-six' in Swedish) in "The Dead Lady of Clown Town"; the main character in "Think Blue, Count Two", Veesey-koosey, which is an English transcription of the Finnish words "viisi" (five) and "kuusi" (six).
  - Four of the characters in the story "Think Blue, Count Two" are called "Thirteen" in different languages: Tiga-belas (both in Indonesian and Malay); Trece (Spanish); Talatashar (based on an Arabic dialect form ثلاث عشر, thalāth ʿashar); and Sh'san (based on Mandarin 十三, shísān, where the 'i' is never pronounced).
  - Other names, notably that of Lord Jestocost (from the Russian Жестокость, which means 'cruelty'), are neither English nor numeric.
- Remnants of twentieth-century culture in the real world are shown as valued antiquities or sometimes unrecognized relics, giving an unusual feeling of nostalgia for the actual present in the fictional world.

== Works ==
=== Fiction ===
==== Short stories ====
Titles marked with an asterisk * are independent stories not related to the Instrumentality universe.

- "War No. 81-Q" (original version, June 1928) * Available online
- "Scanners Live in Vain" (June 1950)
- "The Game of Rat and Dragon" (October 1955)
- "Mark Elf" (May 1957)
- "The Burning of the Brain" (October 1958)
- "Western Science Is So Wonderful" (December 1958) *
- "No, No, Not Rogov!" (February 1959)
- "Nancy" (March 1959) *
- "When the People Fell" (April 1959)
- "Golden the Ship Was—Oh! Oh! Oh!" (April 1959)
- "Angerhelm" (June 1959) *
- "The Fife Of Bodhidharma" (June 1959) *
- "The Lady Who Sailed The Soul" (April 1960)
- "Alpha Ralpha Boulevard" (June 1961)
- "Mother Hitton's Littul Kittons" (June 1961)
- "A Planet Named Shayol" (October 1961)
- "From Gustible's Planet"(July 1962)
- "The Ballad of Lost C'Mell" (October 1962)
- "Think Blue, Count Two" (February 1963)
- The stories making up the collection Quest of the Three Worlds:
  - "On the Gem Planet" (October 1963)
  - "On the Storm Planet" (February 1965)
  - "On the Sand Planet" (December 1965)
  - "Three to a Given Star" (October 1965)
- "Drunkboat" (October 1963)
- "The Good Friends" (October 1963) *
- "The Boy Who Bought Old Earth" (The first half of "Norstrilia", April 1964, adapted into "The Planet Buyer")
- "The Store Of Heart's Desire" (The second half of "Norstrilia", May 1964, adapted into "The Underpeople")
- "The Crime and the Glory of Commander Suzdal" (May 1964)
- "The Dead Lady of Clown Town" (August 1964)
- "Under Old Earth" (February 1966)
- "Down to a Sunless Sea" (October 1975) (with Genevieve Linebarger)
- "The Queen of the Afternoon" (April 1978)
- "The Colonel Came Back from the Nothing-at-All" (May 1979)
- "Himself in Anachron" (1993) (completed by Genevieve Linebarger)
- "War No. 81-Q" (rewritten version, 1993)

==== Novels ====
- Ria (1947; writing as "Felix C. Forrest")
- Carola (1948; writing as "Felix C. Forrest")
- Atomsk: A Novel of Suspense (1949; writing as "Carmichael Smith")
- The Planet Buyer (1964; first half of Norstrilia, with some rearrangement)
- The Underpeople (1968; second half of Norstrilia, with some rearrangement)
- Norstrilia (1975; first complete publication in intended form; corrected edition published in 1994)

==== Collections ====
- You Will Never Be The Same (1963, collection of short science fiction stories)
- Space Lords (1965; short science fiction stories)
- Quest of the Three Worlds (1966; four related science fiction novellas)
- Under Old Earth and Other Explorations (1970; short science fiction stories)
- Stardreamer (1971; short science fiction stories)
- The Best of Cordwainer Smith (1975; 12 short science fiction stories, reprinted in 1999 for the SF Masterworks series as The Rediscovery of Man)
- The Instrumentality of Mankind (1979; 14 short science fiction stories)
- The Rediscovery of Man (1993; definitive and complete compilation of 33 short science fiction writings)
- We the Underpeople (2006; collection of 5 Instrumentality of Mankind short stories and the novel Norstrilia)
- When the People Fell (2007; collection of 28 short stories)

==== Unpublished novels ====
- 1939 (rewritten in 1947) General Death
- 1946 Journey in Search of a Destination
- 1947-1948 The Dead Can Bite (a.k.a. Sarmantia)

=== Non-fiction ===

- The Political Doctrines of Sun Yat-Sen: An Exposition of the San Min Chu I (1937)
- Government in Republican China (1938)
- The China of Chiang K'ai-shek: A Political Study (1941)
- Psychological Warfare (1948; revised second edition, 1954 - available online)
- Foreign milieux (HBM 200/1) (1951)
- Immediate improvement of theater-level psychological warfare in the Far East (1951)
- Far Eastern Government and Politics: China and Japan (1954; with Djang Chu and Ardath W. Burks)
- "Draft statement of a ten-year China and Indochina policy, 1956–1966" (1956)
- Essays on military psychological operations (1966)

== See also ==
- Cordwainer Smith Rediscovery Award
- Golden Age of Science Fiction
- Homer Lea
