= Norstrilia =

1975 science fiction novel by Cordwainer Smith

- First edition in complete form. Front cover illustration by Gray Morrow. Counterclockwise from top: E'telekeli, C'mell, Rod McBan (seated), A'gentur (E'ikasus).
- Author: Cordwainer Smith
- Genre: Science fiction
- Publisher: Ballantine
- Publication date: 1975
- ISBN: 0-575-04235-4

Norstrilia is a science fiction novel by American writer Paul Linebarger, published under the pseudonym Cordwainer Smith. The novel takes place in the universe of Smith's Instrumentality of Mankind. It was heavily influenced by the classic Chinese novel Journey to the West. Norstrilia is in part a sequel to Smith's 1962 short story "The Ballad of Lost C'Mell", which features some of the same characters and settings. The novel was first published as a single book in 1975, after appearing earlier as two short novels in 1964 and 1968.

== Plot ==
The immensely wealthy planet Old North Australia ("Norstrilia") is the only place in the universe which produces the precious immortality drug "stroon". The Norstrilians cull their young in order to prevent overpopulation, and only those who pass the test of the "Garden of Death" are allowed to enter adulthood.

Rod McBan is the last male descendant of one of the oldest Norstrilian families and the heir to one of the best ranches, the Station of Doom. As such, he has been spared the culling three times, though he is considered unfit, as his ability to communicate telepathically with other Norstrilians is erratic. After his last test, which he finally passes with the aid of a Lord of the Instrumentality and his own talents, he learns that an envious former friend, who suffers from an allergy to stroon and so is condemned to live a mere 150 years, seeks to kill him, using the pretext that the test was biased and administered unfairly.

Rod survives one assassination attempt. To escape the danger, he amasses an immense fortune overnight by playing the futures market in stroon, following a plan formulated by his ancient computer which was passed down to him by an eccentric ancestor. By the next day, he is the wealthiest person in history. The Instrumentality changes the rules so it cannot happen again, but allows McBan to keep his money to see what he will do with it.

For his safety, Rod is sent to Earth, where his fortune makes him a magnet for all manner of criminals and revolutionaries. After a series of adventures among the "underpeople" (an underclass of animals modified to resemble humans) with the Cat-woman C'mell, he meets their leader, E'Telekeli. In exchange for most of Rod's fortune, to be used to campaign for the underpeople, E'Telekeli and Lord Jestocost, a Lord of the Instrumentality sympathetic to the cause, send Rod back to Norstrilia after fixing his telepathic disability and providing a psychological remedy for Rod's enemy.

== Publication history ==
Norstrilia was first published as two short novels. The first part appeared as The Planet Buyer in 1964, after a shorter version was published in Galaxy magazine as the novelette "The Boy Who Bought Old Earth".

The second part was published in shorter form, also in 1964, in Galaxy's sister magazine If as "The Store of Heart's Desire"; the story was later published as The Underpeople in 1968, after Smith's death.

The novel was first published in one volume in a 1975 paperback released by Ballantine Books.

In 1994 NESFA Press published the first hardcover edition, adding further revisions and corrections to the text, and including variant texts in an appendix.

The 1994 text appears, without the appendix, in the Baen Books omnibus We, the Underpeople (2008), along with "The Ballad of Lost C'Mell" and four other related stories.

== Reception ==
Algis Budrys of Galaxy Science Fiction magazine reviewed The Planet Buyer, the first half of Norstrilia, favorably; he cited Smith's stylistic ingenuity and described Smith's science fiction stories as "tesserae in a mosaic". The Planet Buyer was nominated for the 1965 Hugo Award for Best Novel.

== Sources ==
- Norstrilia, 1975. Cordwainer Smith, Ballantine Books, ISBN 0-345-24366-8
- Norstrilia, 1995. Cordwainer Smith, NESFA Press, ISBN 0-915368-61-7
- We the Underpeople, 2006. Cordwainer Smith, Baen Books, ISBN 1-4165-2095-3
