= Instrumentality of Mankind =

Fictional interplanetary government

The Instrumentality of Mankind is the name given to the government of humanity in the science fiction of Cordwainer Smith. The term can also refer to these stories collectively, and was used as the title of a collection of short stories published in 1979.

== Origin and history ==
The Instrumentality originated as the police force of the Jwindz or "perfect ones" on a post-nuclear holocaust Earth. After attaining power and the expansion of humans in space, they eventually entered a somewhat stagnant phase in which a fixed lifespan of four hundred years was imposed on the human inhabitants of the planets where the Instrumentality directly ruled, all the hard physical labor was done by rightless animal-derived "underpeople", and children were never raised by their biological parents. This somewhat empty and sterile system was reformed and enlivened by the "Rediscovery of Man", the backdrop against which Smith's novel Norstrilia and the majority of his short stories, covering thousands of years of fictional time, are set. The cycle does not come to a final resolution; in 2010, Frederik Pohl — who, as the editor of Galaxy, made the initial decision to purchase and publish the stories — said that Smith had told him of losing the notebook in which he wrote down his ideas for more Instrumentality material:

[Smith had] been in a small boat somewhere (...) and he had leaned incautiously over the side … and the notebook had fallen out of his breast pocket into the water … and he [had] been able to watch it dropping through the crystal-clear water until at last it was out of sight, and was gone.

Algis Budrys in 1965 praised Smith for creating "a completely consistent phantom universe", in which stories are not sequels to each other but "tesserae in a mosaic". Other authors, he said—including himself—connected stories with a common character or theme; "Not Smith. He's not inventing, he's reporting. And he's doing it from God's point of view", and only the lack of time prevented Smith from portraying all of the "infinite" fictional setting.

== Characteristics ==
Though the Instrumentality does not directly administer every planet, it claims ultimate guardianship over the destiny of the human race. For example, it strictly bans the export of religion from planet to planet. Its members, the Lords and Ladies of the Instrumentality, are collectively all-powerful and often somewhat callously arbitrary. Although their motives are theoretically benign, they act with utmost brutality when survival is at stake.

According to the story "Drunkboat":

Each was a plenum of the low, the middle, and the high justice. Each could do anything he found necessary or proper to maintain the Instrumentality and keep the peace between the worlds. ... The Instrumentality had the perpetual slogan 'Watch, but do not govern; stop war, but do not wage it; protect, but do not control; and first, survive!'

== Individual members ==
Some prominent Lords and Ladies of the Instrumentality:

- Lord Jestocost (the latest of a dynasty of that name), descendant of Lady Goroke
- Lady Panc Ashash (as a posthumous personality recording; the eponymous "Dead Lady of Clown Town".)
- Lord Femtiosex
- Lord Sto Odin
- Lord Crudelta
- Lady Alice More, partner of the seventh Lord Jestocost.
- Lady Arabella Underwood
- Lady Johanna Gnade
- Lord Redlady

The names Goroke, Femtiosex, Sto Odin and Panc Ashash are number-word names of the type common during the Instrumentality's decadent period: "five-six" in Japanese is Go-Roku, in Hindi it is Panc-Ashash, and in Swedish Femtiosex (literally "fifty-six"). 'Tiga-belas' and 'Veesey-koosey', the names of supporting and main characters of the Instrumentality story Think Blue, Count Two, also mean 'thirteen' (Indonesian or Malay tiga meaning three, and belas being equivalent of English "teen") and 'five-six' (Finnish viisi and kuusi), respectively. Sto Odin is "a hundred and one" in Russian. The name Jestocost is based on the word for "cruelty" in Russian (жестокость), and Crudelta is the equivalent in Italian (crudeltà, feminine). Gnade is a German word meaning "grace" or "mercy".

== Cultural references ==
The Human Instrumentality Project in the Neon Genesis Evangelion anime series is a reference to Cordwainer's works. A password used in the anime Serial Experiments Lain, "Think Bule Count One Tow" (used by Lain's father) is a misspelled reference to Think Blue, Count Two.

The Dreadstar comic book features the Church of the Instrumentality which is a space empire. The church has created a race of cat-people, similar to the underpeople of the Instrumentality of Mankind. In the light novel series Log Horizon, the animal-like Werecat, Wolf Fang, and Fox Tail races were created by what was called the Norstrilia Project, in reference to his novel. The anime series Fafner in the Azure is based on concepts of telepathic warfare against an unknown enemy similar to those explored in The Game of Rat and Dragon. Furthermore, the robot piloted by the main character in the first half of the series bears the name Mark Elf, shared by another story set in the Instrumentality fictional universe.

== Selected bibliography ==
- The Rediscovery of Man (short story collection, including all of the Instrumentality of Mankind stories)
- Norstrilia (novel; set relatively late in the chronology of the future history)
