= Fredric Brown bibliography =

The bibliography of American writer Fredric Brown includes short stories, general fiction, mysteries and science fiction stories.

== Short stories ==
=== 1930s ===
1938

- The Moon for a Nickel (Detective Story Magazine, March)

1939

- The Cheese on Stilts (Thrilling Detective, January)
- Blood of the Dragon (Variety Detective, February)
- There Are Bloodstains in the Alley (Detective Yarns, February)
- Let Colonel Cluck Answer Your Questions (Independent Salesman, May)
- Murder at 10:15 (Clues, May)

=== 1940s ===
1940

- Bloody Murder
- The Prehistoric Clue
- A Matter of Taste
- Trouble in a Teacup (also published as "Teacup Trouble")
- Murder Draws a Crowd
- Footprints on the Ceiling
- Town Wanted
- The Little Green Men
- Herbie Rides His Hunch
- The Stranger from Trouble Valley
- The Strange Sisters Strange

1941

- Fugitive Impostor
- The King Comes Home
- Big-Top Doom
- The Discontented Cows
- Life and Fire
- Big-League Larceny
- Client Unknown
- Homicide Sanitarium
- Your Name in Gold
- Here Comes the Hearse
- Six-Gun Song
- Star-Spangled Night
- Wheels Across the Night
- Armageddon
- Little Boy Lost
- Bullet for Bullet
- Listen to the Mocking Bird
- You'll End Up Buming
- Selling Death Short
- Thirty Corpses Every Thursday
- Trouble Comes Double
- Not Yet the End
- Number Bug

1942

- Clue in Blue
- Death is a White Rabbit
- Twenty Gets You Plenty
- Etaoin Shrdlu
- Little Apple Hard to Peel
- Pardon My Ghoulish Laughter
- Death in the Dark (a/p/a "The Black Dark")
- Handbook for Homicide
- The Incredible Bomber
- Twice-Killed Corpse
- Mad Dog!
- Moon Over Murder
- The Star Mouse
- A Cat Walks
- Who Did I Murder
- Murder in Furs
- Suite for Flute and Tommy Gun
- Three Corpse Parlay
- A Date to Die
- Red is the Hue of Hell
- Two Biers for Two
- You'll Die Before Dawn
- Get Out of Town
- A Little White Lye
- Nothing Sinister
- The Numberless Shadows
- Satan's Search Warrant
- Starvation (a/p/a "Runaround")
- Where There's Smoke
- Boner
- Legacy of Murder
- The New One
- The Santa Claus Murders (expanded into novel Murder Can be Fun a/p/a A Plot for Murder)
- Double Murder
- A Fine Night for Murder
- Heil, Werewolf
- I'll See You At Midnight
- The Monkey Angle
- Satan One-and-a-Half
- The Men Who Went Nowhere

1943

- A Lock of Satan's Hair
- The Spherical Ghoul
- The Wicked Flea
- The Angelic Angleworm
- Death is a Noise
- The Hat Trick
- Hound of Hell (a/p/a "Beware of the Dog")
- The Sleuth from Mars
- A Change for the Hearse
- Encore for a Killer
- Trial By Darkness
- Cadavers Don't Make a Fifth Column
- Death of a Vampire
- Death's Dark Angel
- The Freak Show Murders
- Market for Murder
- The Corpse and the Candle
- Madman's Holiday
- Blue Murder
- The Geezenstacks
- Tell 'em, Pagliaccio
- Whispering Death
- Daymare
- Death Insurance Payment
- The Motive Goes Round and Round
- Paradox Lost

1944

- The Djinn Murder
- Murder in Miniature
- The Ghost of Riley
- The Devil's Woodwinds
- And the Gods Laughed
- Nothing Sirius
- The Yehudi Principle
- Arena
- The Jabberwocky Murders (incorporated into novel Night of the Jabberwock)
- The Ghost Breakers
- The Gibbering Night (incorporated into novel Night of the Jabberwock)
- Murder While You Wait
- The Bucket of Gems Case (a/p/a "Mr Smith Kicks the Bucket")
- To Slay a Man About a Dog (a/p/a "Shaggy Dog Murders")
- A Matter of Death

1945

- Pi in the Sky
- The Night the World Ended
- The Waveries
- No Sanctuary
- Compliments of a Fiend (expanded into novel The Bloody Moonlight)
- Ten Tickets to Hades (a/p/a "Murder in Ten Easy Lessons")
- Murder-on-the-Hudson

1946

- Dead Man's Indemnity (expanded into novel The Fabulous Clipjoint)
- Placet is a Crazy Place
- Song of the Dead
- Obit for Obie (expanded into novel The Deep End)
- Whistler's Murder

1947

- A Voice Behind Him
- Don't Look Behind You
- Miss Darkness

1948

- I'll Cut Your Throat Again, Kathleen
- The Dead Ringer (expanded into novel The Dead Ringer)
- Four Letter Word (a/p/a "The Greatest Poem Ever Written")
- The Four Blind Men
- What Mad Universe (expanded into novel What Mad Universe)
- The Laughing Butcher
- If Looks Could Kill (a/p/a "The Joke")
- Cry Silence
- Red-Hot and Hunted
- Knock

1949

- This Way Out
- All Good Bems
- Mouse First published in June 1949 in Thrilling Wonder Stories A man called Bill Wheeler sees a flying saucer land in Central Park in New York, in which only a dead mouse is found. A series of assassinations of world leaders follow, and he begins to suspect that the alien has taken possession of his pet Siamese cat, Beautiful.
- Murder and Matilda
- Come and Go Mad
- Last Curtain (a/p/a "Cream of the Jest")
- Crisis, 1999
- Each Night He Died (a/p/a "Cain")
- "Letter to a Phoenix"
- The Cat from Siam
- The Sinister Mr. Dexter (a/p/a "House of Fear")
- Deadly Weekend (expanded into novel The Screaming Mimi)
- The Bloody Moonlight (condensed from novel The Bloody Moonlight)
- Gateway to Darkness (a/p/a "Small World," incorporated into novel Rogue in Space)

=== 1950s ===
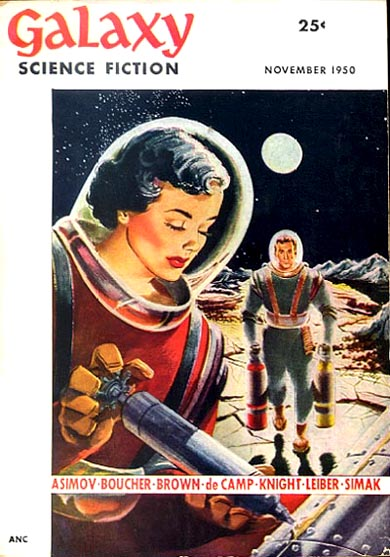
Brown's "Honeymoon in Hell" was the cover story in the second issue of Galaxy Science Fiction in 1950

1950

- The Last Train
- Death and Nine Lives
- The Blind Lead
- The Case of the Dancing Sandwiches
- The Nose of Don Aristide
- Vengeance Unlimited (a/p/a "Vengeance Fleet")
- From These Ashes (a/p/a "Entity Trap")
- The Undying Ones (a/p/a "Obedience")
- Walk in the Shadows
- The Frownzly Florgels
- Gateway to Glory (incorporated into novel Rogue in Space)
- The Last Martian
- Honeymoon in Hell
- Mitkey Rides Again
- Night of the Jabberwock
- Device of the Turtle (a/p/a "Six-Legged Swengali"; with Mack Reynolds)

1951

- Dark Interlude (with Mack Reynolds)
- Man of Distinction
- The Switcheroo
- The Weapon - published in the anthology The War Book (edited by James Sallis, 1969)
- Cartoonist (a/p/a "Garrigan's Bems"; with Mack Reynolds)
- Something Green
- The Dome
- A Word from Our Sponsor
- The Gamblers (with Mack Reynolds)
- The Hatchetman (with Mack Reynolds)

1952

- Me and Flapjack and the Martians (with Mack Reynolds)

1953

- Witness in the Dark
- The Pickled Punks (expanded into novel Madball)
- The Wench is Dead (expanded into novel The Wench is Dead)
- The Little Lamb
- Rustle of Wings
- Hall of Mirrors

1954

- Two Timer (Galaxy Science Fiction, February)

Experiment
Sentry

- Keep Out
- Martians, Go Home (expanded into novel Martians, Go Home)
- Naturally
- Voodoo
- Answer
- Daisies
- Pattern
- Politeness
- Preposterous
- Reconciliation
- Search
- Sentence
- Solipsist

1955

- Blood
- Millennium
- Premiere of Murder
- The Perfect Crime (a/p/a "Fatal Error")
- The Letter (a/p/a "Dead Letter")
- The First Time Machine
- Too Far
- Imagine

1956

- Line of Duty (expanded into novel The Lenient Beast)

1957

- Murder Set to Music
- Expedition
- Happy Ending (with Mack Reynolds)

1958

- The Amy Waggoner Murder Case (expanded into novel One for the Road)
- Jaycee
- Unfortunately
- Who Was That Blonde I Saw You Kill Last Night? (expanded into novel His Name was Death)

1959

- The Late Lamented (expanded into novel The Late Lamented)
- Nasty
- Rope Trick
- Night of the Psycho (expanded into novel Knock Three-One-Two)

=== 1960s ===
1960

- Abominable
- Bear Possibility
- The Mind Thing (never completed serialization later published as novel The Mind Thing)
- Recessional
- The Power (a/p/a "Rebound")
- Earthmen Bearing Gifts
- Granny's Birthday
- The House

1961

- Great Lost Discoveries I - Invisibility
- Great Lost Discoveries II - Invulnerability
- Great Lost Discoveries III - Immortality
- The Hobbyist
- Nightmare in Blue
- Nightmare in Gray
- Nightmare in Red
- Nightmare in Time (a/p/a "The End")
- Nightmare in Yellow
- Of Time and Eustace Weaver ("The Short Happy Lives of E. Weaver I-II-III")
- Bright Beard
- Cat Burglar
- Death on the Mountain
- Fish Story
- Horse Race
- Nightmare in Green
- Nightmare in White
- The Ring of Hans Carvel
- Second Chance
- Three Little Owls
- Before She Kills

1962

- Aelurophobe
- Puppet Show
- Fatal Facsimile

1963

- Double Standard
- Instant Novellas (a/p/a "20 Stories in 60 Lines")
- It Didn't Happen
- Tale of the Flesh Monger (a/p/a "Ten Percenter")
- The Missing Actor

1964

- Why, Benny, Why

1965

- Eine Kleine Nachtmusik (with Carl Onspaugh)

== General fiction ==
- The Office (1958) (reprinted by Dennis McMillan in 1987)

== Mysteries ==
- The Fabulous Clipjoint (E. P. Dutton 1947, Bantam 302, 1948), Edgar Award winner for best first novel. "Eighteen-year-old Ed Hunter joins forces with his uncle, carnival-pitchman Ambrose Hunter, to track the person who bludgeoned Ed's father (Am's brother) to death in a dark Chicago alley. Later Ed and Am open their own detective agency and are involved regularly in murder."
- The Dead Ringer (E. P. Dutton 1948, Bantam 361, 1949), second "Ed & Am Hunter" novel
- Murder Can Be Fun (E. P. Dutton 1948), as A Plot for Murder (Bantam 735, 1949)
- The Bloody Moonlight (E. P. Dutton 1949, Bantam 783, 1950), third "Ed & Am Hunter" novel
- The Screaming Mimi (E. P. Dutton 1949, Bantam 831, 1950)
- Compliments of a Fiend (E. P. Dutton 1950, Bantam 876 1951), fourth "Ed & Am Hunter" novel
- Here Comes a Candle (E. P. Dutton 1950, Bantam 943 1951)
- Night of the Jabberwock (E. P. Dutton 1950, Bantam 990 1951, Quill / William Morrow 1984)
- Death Has Many Doors (E. P. Dutton 1951, Bantam 1040 1952), fifth "Ed & Am Hunter" novel
- The Far Cry (E. P. Dutton 1951, Bantam 1133 1952)
- The Case of the Dancing Sandwiches (1951), novella
- We All Killed Grandma (E. P. Dutton 1952, Bantam 1176)
- The Deep End (E. P. Dutton 1952, Bantam 1215)
- Mostly Murder (E. P. Dutton 1953, Pennant P59 1954), collection
- Madball (Dell 1953, Fawcett S1132 1981)
- His Name Was Death (E. P. Dutton 1954, Bantam 1436 1956)
- The Wench Is Dead (E. P. Dutton 1955, Bantam 1565 1957)
- The Lenient Beast (E. P. Dutton 1956, Bantam 1712 1958), ISBN 978-0-88184-444-3
- One for the Road (E. P. Dutton 1958, Bantam 1990 1959)
- The Late Lamented (E. P. Dutton 1959, Bantam 2030 1960), sixth "Ed & Am Hunter" novel
- Knock Three-One-Two (E. P. Dutton 1959, Bantam A2135 1960)
- The Murderers (E. P. Dutton 1961, Bantam J2587 1963)
- Five-Day Nightmare (E. P. Dutton 1962, Tower 42-502 1962)
- Mrs. Murphy's Underpants (E. P. Dutton 1963), seventh "Ed & Am Hunter" novel
- The Shaggy Dog and Other Murders (E. P. Dutton 1963), collection
- 4 Novels (1983), omnibus of The Fabulous Clipjoint, Knock Three-One-Two, Night of the Jabberwock and The Screaming Mimi
- Carnival of Crime (1985), collection
- Hunter and Hunted: The Ed and Am Hunter Novels, Part One (2002), ISBN 978-0-9718185-1-4, published by Stewart Masters Publishing, omnibus of The Fabulous Clipjoint, The Dead Ringer, The Bloody Moonlight and Compliments of a Fiend.

In 1984, Dennis McMillan Publications began a series of nineteen limited edition books under the title Fredric Brown in the Detective Pulps, collecting most of Brown's uncollected mystery short stories, plus some uncollected science fiction, poetry, unfinished novels, and miscellaneous fiction:

- Homicide Sanitarium (1984)
- Before She Kills (1984)
- Madman's Holiday (1984)
- The Case of the Dancing Sandwiches (1985)
- The Freak Show Murders (1985)
- Thirty Corpses Every Thursday (1986)
- Pardon My Ghoulish Laughter (1986)
- Red is the Hue of Hell (1986)
- Sex Life on the Planet Mars (1986)
- Brother Monster (1987)
- Nightmare in Darkness (1987)
- Who was that Blonde I Saw You Kill Last Night? (1988)
- Three-Corpse Parley (1988)
- Selling Death Short (1988)
- Whispering Death (1989)
- Happy Ending (1990)
- The Water-Walker (1990)
- The Gibbering Night (1991)
- The Pickled Punks (1991)

In the final volume, McMillan discussed Fredric Brown material that was still uncollected, with particular reference to a column that Brown wrote from 1937 to 1946 called The Proofreaders' Page, mentioning that these would "take a book in themselves". Twenty years later that book was published, including both the columns and a selection of other uncollected fiction, poetry and non-fiction as:

- The Proofreaders' Page and Other Uncollected Items (2011), ISBN 978-1-105-03045-1, published by Galactic Central Publications

== Science fiction ==
His first science fiction story, "Not Yet the End", was published in Captain Future in 1941.

- What Mad Universe (E. P. Dutton 1949, Bantam 835 1950)
- The Lights in the Sky Are Stars (E. P. Dutton 1953, Bantam 1285 1954), also published as Project Jupiter (T. V. Boardman 1955, Digit D173 1958)
- Martians, Go Home (E. P. Dutton 1955, Bantam A1546 1956), which was the basis for a 1990 movie of the same name, starring Randy Quaid and Margaret Colin
- Rogue in Space (E. P. Dutton 1957, Bantam A1701 1958)
- The Mind Thing (Bantam A2187 1961)

== Collections of short stories ==
- Space on My Hands (Shasta 1951, Bantam 1077 1953), ISBN 978-0-89968-332-4
- Angels and Spaceships (E. P Dutton 1954) also published as Star Shine (Bantam 1423 1956)
- Honeymoon in Hell (Bantam A1812 1958)
- Nightmares and Geezenstacks (Bantam J2296 1961)
- Daymares (Lancer 1968)
- Paradox Lost, and Twelve Other Great Science Fiction Stories (Random House 1973, Berkley Medallion 1974)
- The Best of Fredric Brown (Del Rey 1976; edited and introduced by Robert Bloch)

Most of his science fiction and fantasy is collected in two volumes from NESFA Press:

- From These Ashes: The Complete Short SF of Fredric Brown (2001), ISBN 978-1-886778-18-4
- Martians and Madness: The Complete SF Novels of Fredric Brown (2002), ISBN 978-1-886778-17-7
