= Ballantine's Classic Library of Science Fiction =

The first volume, published in 1974

Ballantine's Classic Library of Science Fiction is a series of speculative fiction collections originally published from 1974 to 1988 purporting to gather together the career-best short works of a selection of authors then prominent in the field. The series was conceived and published in paperback by Ballantine Books (later Del Rey Books), though most of the early volumes also had initial hardcover editions issued by Doubleday's Science Fiction Book Club preceding the Ballantine/Del Rey paperback editions. A number of volumes were subsequently reprinted, both by the original and later publishers.

== Title variations ==
The series title varied over time; with volumes published in 1974 issued without an overall title, volumes published from 1975 into 1977 called "Ballantine's Classic Library of Science Fiction," or "our Classic Library of Science Fiction" in the instance of a few Del Rey printings, and volumes published from November 1975 onward called "The Critically Acclaimed Series of Classic Science Fiction." Most volumes bore the words "Classic Science Fiction" on the above the title of the individual volume. A number of volumes were subsequently reprinted, both by the original and later publishers.

== Content ==
Individual volumes typically included laudatory introductions by fellow authors associated with or close to the authors spotlighted, and afterwords by the spotlighted authors themselves, if still living at the time of publication.

== The series ==
Author and publication date follow each title.

- The Best of Stanley G. Weinbaum (Stanley G. Weinbaum) (Jun. 1974)
- The Best of Fritz Leiber (Fritz Leiber) (Nov. 1974)
- The Best of Henry Kuttner (Henry Kuttner) (Apr. 1975)
- The Best of Frederik Pohl (Frederik Pohl) (Jun. 1975)
- The Best of Cordwainer Smith (Cordwainer Smith) (Sep. 1975)
- The Best of C. L. Moore (C. L. Moore) (Mar. 1976)
- The Best of John W. Campbell (John W. Campbell) (Jun. 1976)
- The Best of C. M. Kornbluth (C. M. Kornbluth) (Jan. 1977)
- The Best of Philip K. Dick (Philip K. Dick) (Mar. 1977)
- The Best of Fredric Brown (Fredric Brown) (May 1977)
- The Best of Edmond Hamilton (Edmond Hamilton) (Aug. 1977)
- The Best of Leigh Brackett (Leigh Brackett) (Sep. 1977)
- The Best of Robert Bloch (Robert Bloch) (Nov. 1977)
- The Best of Murray Leinster (Murray Leinster ) (Apr. 1978)
- The Best of L. Sprague de Camp (L. Sprague de Camp) (May 1978)
- The Best of Jack Williamson (Jack Williamson) (Jun. 1978)
- The Best of Raymond Z. Gallun (Raymond Z. Gallun) (Aug. 1978)
- The Best of Lester del Rey (Lester del Rey) (Sep. 1978)
- The Best of Eric Frank Russell (Eric Frank Russell) (Oct. 1978)
- The Best of Hal Clement (Hal Clement) (Jun. 1979)
- The Best of James Blish (James Blish) (Aug. 1979)
- The Best of H. P. Lovecraft (H. P. Lovecraft) (Oct. 1982)
- The Best of John Brunner (John Brunner) (Nov. 1988)

== Comparable series ==
A number of contemporary series were issued by other publishers, also made up of individual volumes covering the works of single authors. DAW Books published The Book of [author's name] starting in 1972. Pocket Books published its own "Best of" series from 1976 to 1982. Ace Books published The Worlds of [author's name] series from 1966-1983.
