= The Best of Fredric Brown =

1977 collection of science fiction short stories by Fredric Brown

- Cover of first edition
- Author: Fredric Brown
- Cover artist: Richard V. Corben
- Language: English
- Series: Ballantine's Classic Library of Science Fiction
- Genre: Science fiction
- Publisher: Doubleday
- Publication date: 1977
- Publication place: United States
- Media type: Print (hardback)
- Pages: 280
- OCLC: 3273613
- Preceded by: The Best of Philip K. Dick
- Followed by: The Best of Edmond Hamilton

The Best of Fredric Brown is a collection of science fiction short stories by American author Fredric Brown, edited by Robert Bloch. It was first published in hardback by Nelson Doubleday in January 1977 and in paperback by Ballantine Books in May of the same year as a volume in its Classic Library of Science Fiction. The book has been translated into German and Spanish.

== Summary ==
The book contains thirty-one short works of fiction by the author, together with an introduction by editor Robert Bloch.

== Contents ==
- "Introduction" (Robert Bloch)
- "Arena" (from Astounding Science Fiction, Jun. 1944)
- "Imagine" (poem) (from The Magazine of Fantasy & Science Fiction, May 1955)
- "It Didn't Happen" (from Playboy, Oct. 1963)
- "Recessional" (from The Dude, Mar. 1960)
- "Eine Kleine Nachtmusik" (with Carl Onspaugh) (from The Magazine of Fantasy & Science Fiction, Jun. 1965)
- "Puppet Show" (from Playboy, Nov. 1962)
- "Nightmare in Yellow" (from Nightmares and Geezenstacks, Jul. 1961)
- "Earthmen Bearing Gifts" (from Galaxy Magazine, Jun. 1960)
- "Jaycee" (from The Magazine of Fantasy & Science Fiction, Oct. 1958)
- "Pi in the Sky" (from Thrilling Wonder Stories, Win. 1945)
- "Answer" (from Angels and Spaceships, Sep. 1954)
- "The Geezenstacks" (from Weird Tales, Sep. 1943)
- "Hall of Mirrors" (from Galaxy Science Fiction, Dec. 1953)
- "Knock" (from Thrilling Wonder Stories, Dec. 1948)
- "Rebound" (from Galaxy Magazine, Apr. 1960)
- "Star Mouse" (from Planet Stories, Spr. 1942)
- "Abominable" (from The Dude, Mar. 1960)
- "Letter to a Phoenix" (from Astounding Science Fiction, Aug. 1949)
- "Not Yet the End" (from Captain Future, Win. 1941)
- "Etaoin Shrdlu" (from Unknown Worlds, Feb. 1942)
- "Armageddon" (from Unknown Fantasy Fiction, Aug. 1941)
- "Experiment" (from Galaxy Science Fiction, Feb. 1954)
- "The Short Happy Lives of Eustace Weaver I" (from Ellery Queen's Mystery Magazine, Jun. 1961)
- "The Short Happy Lives of Eustace Weaver II" (from Ellery Queen's Mystery Magazine, Jun. 1961)
- "The Short Happy Lives of Eustace Weaver III" (from Ellery Queen's Mystery Magazine, Jun. 1961)
- "Reconciliation" (from Angels and Spaceships, Sep. 1954)
- "Nothing Sirius" (from Captain Future, Spr. 1944)
- "Pattern" (from Angels and Spaceships, Sep. 1954)
- "The Yehudi Principle" (from Astounding Science Fiction, US edition May 1944, UK edition Aug. 1944)
- "Come and Go Mad" (from Weird Tales, Jul. 1949)
- "The End" (from Dude, May 1961)

== Reception ==
The book was reviewed by Everett F. Bleiler in The Guide to Supernatural Fiction, 1983, and Juan Manuel Santiago in Las 100 mejores novelas de ciencia ficción del siglo XX, 2001.

== Awards ==
The book placed fourteenth in the 1977 Locus Poll Award for Best Single Author Collection. "Star Mouse" was nominated for the 1943 Retro Hugo Award for Best Novelette in 2018. "Etaoin Shrdlu" was nominated for the 1943 Retro Hugo Award for Best Short Story in 2018. "The Geezenstacks" was nominated for the 1944 Retro Hugo Award for Best Short Story in 2019. "Arena" was nominated for the 1945 Retro Hugo Award for Best Novelette in 2020. "The Yehudi Principle" was nominated for the 1945 Retro Hugo Award for Best Short Story in 2020. "Pi in the Sky" was nominated for the 1946 Retro Hugo Award for Best Novelette in 1996.
