= Martians Go Home =

Martians Go Home could refer to:

- Martians, Go Home, a 1955 novel by Fredric Brown
- Martians Go Home (film), a 1989 adaptation of the novel, starring Randy Quaid
- Martians Go Home (record label), a record label based in Champaign, Illinois, created by the members of Hum
