= The Best of Hal Clement =

1979 collection of science fiction short stories by Hal Clement

- Cover of first edition
- Author: Hal Clement
- Cover artist: H. R. Van Dongen
- Language: English
- Series: Ballantine's Classic Library of Science Fiction
- Genre: Science fiction
- Publisher: Del Rey/Ballantine
- Publication date: 1979
- Publication place: United States
- Media type: Print (paperback)
- Pages: xvii, 379
- ISBN: 0-345-27689-2
- Preceded by: The Best of Eric Frank Russell
- Followed by: The Best of James Blish

The Best of Hal Clement is a collection of science fiction short stories by American author Hal Clement, edited by Lester del Rey. It was first published in paperback by Del Rey/Ballantine in June 1979 as a volume in its Classic Library of Science Fiction. It was reissued in ebook by Gateway/Orion in May 2013, and in trade paperback and ebook by Phoenix Pick in December 2014.

== Summary ==
The book contains ten short works of fiction and an afterword by the author, together with an introduction by editor Lester del Rey.

== Contents ==
- "Hal Clement: Rationalist" [introduction] (Lester del Rey)
- "Impediment" (from Astounding Science-Fiction, Aug. 1942)
- "Technical Error" (from Astounding Science Fiction, Jan. 1944)
- "Uncommon Sense" (from Astounding Science Fiction, Sep. 1945)
- "Assumption Unjustified" (from Astounding Science Fiction, Oct. 1946)
- "Answer" (from Astounding Science Fiction, Apr. 1947)
- "Dust Rag" (from Astounding Science Fiction, Sep. 1956)
- "Bulge" (from If, Sep. 1968)
- "Mistaken for Granted" (from Worlds of If, Jan./Feb. 1974)
- "A Question of Guilt" (from The Year's Best Horror Stories: Series IV, Nov. 1976)
- "Stuck with It" (from Stellar #2, Feb. 1976)
- "Author's Afterword"

== Reception ==
The book was reviewed by Stephen W. Potts in Science Fiction & Fantasy Book Review, Nov. 1979.

== Awards ==
The book placed tenth in the 1980 Locus Poll Award for Best Single Author Collection. "Uncommon Sense" won the 1946 Retro Hugo Award for Best Short Story, awarded in 1996.
