= Fossil (disambiguation) =

A fossil is the mineralized remains of a dead organism.

Fossil may also refer to:

== Literature ==
- Fossil (novel), a 1993 book written by Hal Clement
- The Fossil (play), a 1925 play by Carl Sternheim
- Pauline, Petrova and Posy Fossil, characters in the 1936 novel Ballet Shoes

== Music ==
- Fossils (band), a rock band from Kolkata, India
- Fossils (album), a 1991 album by Dinosaur Jr.
- "Fossil", a song by His Name is Alive from the album Livonia
- Fossiles, the 12th movement in the musical suite The Carnival of the Animals

== Technology ==
- FOSSIL, a protocol for serial communications
- Fossil (software), a source code control for programmers
- Fossil (file system), the file system in Plan 9 from Bell Labs

== Places ==
- Fossil, Oregon, US, a city
- Fossil, Wyoming, a former settlement near Fossil Butte National Monument, US

== Other uses ==
- Fossil (Pokémon Trading Card Game)
- The Fossil (film), a 1972 Japanese film
- Fossil Group, a clothing and accessories company
- Fossilization (linguistics), a type of bound morpheme
