= The Best of Lester del Rey =

1978 collection of science fiction short stories by Lester del Rey

- Cover of first edition
- Author: Lester del Rey
- Cover artist: H. R. Van Dongen
- Language: English
- Series: Ballantine's Classic Library of Science Fiction
- Genre: Science fiction
- Publisher: Del Rey/Ballantine
- Publication date: 1978
- Publication place: United States
- Media type: Print (paperback)
- Pages: xvii, 379
- ISBN: 0-345-27689-2
- OCLC: 4303963
- Preceded by: The Best of Raymond Z. Gallun
- Followed by: The Best of Eric Frank Russell

The Best of Lester del Rey is a collection of science fiction short stories by American author Lester del Rey. It was first published in paperback by Del Rey/Ballantine in September 1978 as a volume in its Classic Library of Science Fiction, with a Science Fiction Book Club hardcover edition following in December of the same year. It was reprinted by Del Rey Books in March 1986, February 1995, and June 2000. The book has been translated into German.

== Summary ==
The book contains sixteen short works of fiction and an afterword by the author, together with an introduction by Frederik Pohl.

== Contents ==
- "The Magnificent" [introduction] (Frederik Pohl)
- "Helen O'Loy" (from Astounding Science-Fiction, Dec. 1938)
- "The Day Is Done" (from Astounding Science-Fiction, May 1939)
- "The Coppersmith" (from Unknown, Sep. 1939)
- "Hereafter, Inc." (from Unknown Worlds, Dec. 1941)
- "The Wings of Night" (from Astounding Science-Fiction, Mar. 1942)
- "Into Thy Hands" (from Astounding Science Fiction, Aug. 1945)
- "And It Comes Out Here" (from Galaxy Science Fiction, Feb. 1951)
- "The Monster" (from Argosy, Jun. 1951)
- "The Years Draw Nigh" (from Astounding Science Fiction, Oct. 1951)
- "Instinct" (from Astounding Science Fiction, Jan. 1952)
- "Superstition" (from Astounding Science Fiction, Aug. 1954)
- "For I Am a Jealous People!" (from Star Short Novels, Oct. 1954)
- "The Keepers of the House" (from Fantastic Universe, Jan. 1956)
- "Little Jimmy" (from The Magazine of Fantasy & Science Fiction, Apr. 1957)
- "The Seat of Judgment" (from Venture Science Fiction Magazine, Jul. 1957)
- "Vengeance Is Mine" (from Galaxy Magazine, Dec, 1964)
- "Author's Afterword"

== Reception ==
The book was reviewed by Algis Budrys in The Magazine of Fantasy & Science Fiction, March 1979, Brian Stableford in Paperback Parlour, December 1979, Vernon Hyles in Fantasy Review, May 1986, and Peter Heck in Asimov's Science Fiction, January 2001.

== Awards ==
"Helen O'Loy" was nominated for the 1939 Retro Hugo Award for Best Short Story in 2014. "Into Thy Hands" was nominated for the 1946 Retro Hugo Award for Best Short Story in 1996.
