= The Best of Eric Frank Russell =

1978 collection of science fiction short stories by Eric Frank Russell

- Cover of first edition
- Author: Eric Frank Russell
- Cover artist: H. R. Van Dongen
- Language: English
- Series: Ballantine's Classic Library of Science Fiction
- Genre: Science fiction
- Publisher: Del Rey/Ballantine
- Publication date: 1978
- Publication place: United States
- Media type: Print (paperback)
- Pages: xv, 336
- ISBN: 0-345-27700-7
- Preceded by: The Best of Lester del Rey
- Followed by: The Best of Hal Clement

The Best of Eric Frank Russell is a collection of science fiction short stories by British author Eric Frank Russell. It was first published in paperback by Del Rey/Ballantine in October 1978 as a volume in its Classic Library of Science Fiction. It was reprinted in July 1986 and March 1987. The book has been translated into German.

== Summary ==
The book contains thirteen short works of fiction by the author, together with an introduction by Alan Dean Foster.

== Contents ==
- "The Symbiote of Hooton" [introduction] (Alan Dean Foster)
- "Mana" (from Astounding Stories, Dec. 1937)
- "Jay Score" (from Astounding Science-Fiction, May 1941)
- "Homo Saps" (from Astounding Science-Fiction, Dec. 1941)
- "Metamorphosite" (from Astounding Science Fiction, Dec. 1946)
- "Hobbyist" (from Astounding Science Fiction, Sep. 1947)
- "Late Night Final" (from Astounding Science Fiction, Dec. 1948)
- "Dear Devil" (from Other Worlds Science Stories, May 1950)
- "Fast Falls the Eventide" (from Astounding Science Fiction, May 1952)
- "I Am Nothing" (from Astounding Science Fiction, Jul. 1952)
- "Weak Spot" (from Astounding Science Fiction, May 1954)
- "Allamagoosa" (from Astounding Science Fiction, May 1955)
- "Into Your Tent I'll Creep" (from Astounding Science Fiction, Sep. 1957)
- "Study in Still Life" (from Astounding Science Fiction, Jan. 1959)

== Reception ==
The book was reviewed by P. J. Stevens (1978) in Australian SF News, Dec. 1978, uncredited reviewers in SF Perry Rhodan Magazin, Jul. 1980 and in Reclams Science Fiction Führer, 1982, and "Maik" (Michael Nagula) in Perry Rhodan no. 898, 1983.

== Awards ==
The book placed tenth in the 1979 Locus Poll Award for Best Single Author Collection.
