= The Best of Raymond Z. Gallun =

1978 collection of science fiction short stories by Raymond Z. Gallun

- Cover of first edition
- Author: Raymond Z. Gallun
- Cover artist: H. R. Van Dongen
- Language: English
- Series: Ballantine's Classic Library of Science Fiction
- Genre: Science fiction
- Publisher: Del Rey/Ballantine
- Publication date: 1978
- Publication place: United States
- Media type: Print (paperback)
- Pages: xvi, 336
- ISBN: 0-345-25273-X
- OCLC: 4248714
- Preceded by: The Best of Jack Williamson
- Followed by: The Best of Lester del Rey

The Best of Raymond Z. Gallun is a collection of science fiction short stories by American author Raymond Z. Gallun, edited by J. J. Pierce. It was first published in paperback by Del Rey/Ballantine in August 1978 as a volume in its Classic Library of Science Fiction.

== Summary ==
The book contains thirteen short works of fiction and an afterword by the author, together with an introduction by editor J. J. Pierce.

== Contents ==
- "Raymond Z. Gallun, The Quiet Revolutionary" [introduction] (J. J. Pierce)
- "Old Faithful" (from Astounding Stories, Dec. 1934)
- "Derelict" (from Astounding Stories, Oct. 1935)
- "Davey Jones' Ambassador" (from Astounding Stories, Dec. 1935)
- "Godson of Almarlu" (from Astounding Stories, Oct. 1936)
- "A Menace in Miniature" (from Astounding Stories, Oct. 1937)
- "Seeds of the Dusk" (from Astounding Science-Fiction, Jun. 1938)
- "Hotel Cosmos" (from Astounding Science-Fiction, Jul. 1938)
- "Magician of Dream Valley" (from Astounding Science-Fiction, Oct. 1938)
- "The Shadow of the Veil" (from Astounding Science-Fiction, Feb. 1939)
- "The Lotus-Engine" (from Super Science Stories, Mar. 1940)
- "Prodigal's Aura" (from Astounding Science Fiction, Apr. 1951)
- "The Restless Tide" (from Marvel Science Fiction, Nov. 1951)
- "Return of a Legend" (from Planet Stories, Mar. 1952)
- "Afterword"

== Reception ==
James McGlothlin on blackgate.com writes that he "really, really struggled reading" the book due to Gullun's "stiff" writing style, "wooden" characterizations, and typically "cold-hearted" protagonists, as well as his "often ... breaking the 'Show, Don't Tell' rule of good writing." He notes that "dispassionate, resourceful scientists — human or alien — are usually the heroes of Gallun's stories. Or better, one might say Science (with a capital 'S' is the real hero." He finds "one good quality that clearly comes across" in the author's fascination "with natural events or scientific phenomena that seemingly could not take place within the bounds of known science" that he "greatly enjoyed [demonstrating] might be plausibly and scientifically viable" in "stories [that] usually attempted to encourage wonder at what science might be capable of explaining." McGlothlin finds this "a novel aesthetic and perhaps educational goal." Nonetheless, he feels Gallun "is probably best seen as an historical example of a bygone day," who "might still occasionally inspire scientific awe in some, but ... is more likely to leave one fairly cold."

== Awards ==
"Seeds of the Dusk" was a preliminary nominee for the 1939 Retro Hugo Award for Best Novelette in 2014.
