= The Best of James Blish =

1979 collection of science fiction short stories by James Blish

- Cover of first edition
- Author: James Blish
- Cover artist: H. R. Van Dongen
- Language: English
- Series: Ballantine's Classic Library of Science Fiction
- Genre: Science fiction
- Publisher: Del Rey/Ballantine
- Publication date: 1979
- Publication place: United States
- Media type: Print (paperback)
- Pages: xxi, 358
- ISBN: 0-345-25600-X
- OCLC: 5345059
- Preceded by: The Best of Hal Clement
- Followed by: The Best of H. P. Lovecraft

The Best of James Blish is a collection of science fiction short stories by American author James Blish (1921–1975), edited by Robert A. W. Lowndes. It was first published in paperback by Del Rey/Ballantine in August 1979 as a volume in its Classic Library of Science Fiction.

== Contents ==
The book contains 12 short works of fiction and an afterword by the author in the persona of one of his pseudonyms, William Atheling Jr., together with an introduction by editor Robert A. W. Lowndes.

- "Science Fiction the Hard Way" [introduction] (Robert A. W. Lowndes)
- "Citadel of Thought" (from Stirring Science Stories, Feb. 1941)
- "The Box" (from Thrilling Wonder Stories, Apr. 1949)
- "There Shall Be No Darkness" (from Thrilling Wonder Stories, Apr. 1950)
- "Surface Tension" (from Galaxy Science Fiction, Aug. 1952)
- "Testament of Andros" (from Future Science Fiction, Jan. 1953)
- "Common Time" (from Shadow of Tomorrow, Jul. 1953)
- "Beep" (from Galaxy Science Fiction, Feb. 1954)
- "A Work of Art" (from Science Fiction Stories, Jul. 1956)
- "This Earth of Hours" (from The Magazine of Fantasy & Science Fiction, Jun. 1959)
- "The Oath" (from The Magazine of Fantasy & Science Fiction, Oct. 1960)
- "How Beautiful with Banners" (from Orbit 1, 1966)
- "A Style in Treason" (from Galaxy Magazine, May 1970)
- "Probapossible Prolegomena to Ideareal History" [afterword] ("William Atheling, Jr.") (from Foundation #13, May 1978)

== Reception ==
The book was reviewed by Taras Wolansky in Science Fiction & Fantasy Book Review, October 1979, and Tom Easton in Analog Science Fiction/Science Fact, April 1980.

== Awards ==
The book placed sixth in the 1980 Locus Poll Award for Best Single Author Collection. "A Style in Treason" was nominated for the 1971 Hugo Award for Best Novella/
