= The Best of Murray Leinster =

- Cover of first edition
- Author: Murray Leinster
- Cover artist: Peter Jones
- Language: English
- Series: Ballantine's Classic Library of Science Fiction
- Genre: Science fiction
- Publisher: Corgi
- Publication date: 1976
- Publication place: United Kingdom
- Media type: Print (paperback)
- Pages: 174 (UK)
- ISBN: 0-552-10333-0
- Preceded by: The Best of Robert Bloch
- Followed by: The Best of L. Sprague de Camp

The Best of Murray Leinster is the title of two collections of science fiction short stories by American author Murray Leinster. The first, a British edition edited by Brian Davis, was first published in paperback by Corgi in December 1976. The second, an American edition edited by J. J. Pierce, was first published in paperback by Del Rey/Ballantine in April 1978 as a volume in its Classic Library of Science Fiction. The American edition has since been translated into German and Italian.

== Summary ==
The British edition contains ten short works of fiction by the author, together with an introduction by editor Brian Davis. The American edition contains thirteen short works of fiction by the author, together with an introduction by editor J. J. Pierce. The selection of stories varies between the two versions, with only three ("The Ethical Equations," "Symbiosis" and "Pipeline to Pluto") common to both.

== Contents (British edition) ==
- "Introduction" (Brian Davis)
- "Time to Die" (from Astounding Science Fiction, Jan. 1947)
- "The Ethical Equations" (from Astounding Science Fiction, Jun. 1945)
- "Symbiosis" (from Collier's, Jun. 14, 1947)
- "Interference" (from Astounding Science Fiction, Oct. 1945)
- "De Profundis" (from Thrilling Wonder Stories, Feb. 1945)
- "Pipeline to Pluto" (from Astounding Science Fiction, Aug. 1945)
- "Sam, This Is You" (from Galaxy Science Fiction, May 1955)
- "The Devil of East Lupton" (from Thrilling Wonder Stories, Aug. 1948)
- "Scrimshaw" (from Astounding Science Fiction, Sep. 1955)
- "If You Was a Moklin" (from Galaxy Science Fiction, Sep. 1951)

== Contents (American edition) ==
- "The Dean of Science Fiction" [introduction] (John J. Pierce)
- "Sidewise in Time" (from Astounding Stories, Jun. 1934)
- "Proxima Centauri" (from Astounding Stories, Mar. 1935)
- "The Fourth-Dimensional Demonstrator" (from Astounding Stories, Dec. 1935)
- "First Contact" (from Astounding Science Fiction, May 1945)
- "The Ethical Equations" (from Astounding Science Fiction, Jun. 1945)
- "Pipeline to Pluto" (from Astounding Science Fiction, Aug. 1945)
- "The Power" (from Astounding Science Fiction, Sep. 1945)
- "A Logic Named Joe" (from Astounding Science Fiction, Mar. 1946)
- "Symbiosis" (from Collier's, Jun. 14, 1947)
- "The Strange Case of John Kingman" (from Astounding Science Fiction, May 1948)
- "The Lonely Planet" (from Thrilling Wonder Stories, Dec. 1949)
- "Keyhole" (from Thrilling Wonder Stories, Dec. 1951)
- "Critical Difference" (from Astounding Science Fiction, Jul. 1956)

== Reception ==
The British edition was reviewed by Philip Stephensen-Payne in Paperback Parlour, February 1977, Brian Stableford in Vector Review Supplement 1, 1977, and Richard Lupoff in Starship, Fall 1979. The American edition was also reviewed by Richard Lupoff in Starship, Fall 1979.

== Awards ==
"First Contact" won the 1946 Retro Hugo Award for Best Novelette in 1996, and "The Ethical Equations" was nominated for the Retro Hugo Award for Best Short Story for the same year, both in 1996.
