= The Man Who Evolved =

- Short story by Edmond Hamilton
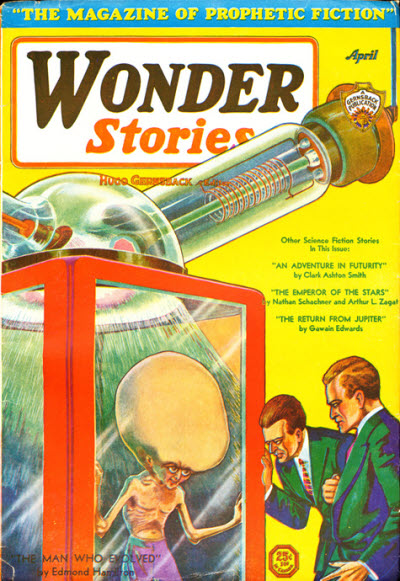
- Country: USA
- Language: English
- Genre: Science fiction

Publication
- Published in: Wonder Stories
- Publication type: Periodical
- Publisher: Gernsback Publications
- Media type: Print (Magazine, Hardback & Paperback)
- Publication date: April 1931

"The Man Who Evolved" is a science fiction short story by American writer Edmond Hamilton, first published in the April 1931 issue of Wonder Stories. In his comments on the story in Before the Golden Age, Isaac Asimov called it the first science fiction short story (as opposed to novel) that impressed him so much it stayed in his mind permanently. In her introduction to The Best of Edmond Hamilton, Leigh Brackett called the story "a fine example of Hamilton's skill in encapsulating an enormous theme into the neat and perfect compass of a short story".

== Plot summary ==
The narrator, Arthur Wright, and his friend Hugh Dutton visit their former classmate, Dr. John Pollard at his combination house/laboratory. Pollard, a classic mad scientist, has been conducting research into the question of what causes the mutations that drive evolution. Pollard informs them that he has determined that cosmic rays are the source of the mutations, and that he has decided that bombarding himself with heavy concentrations of cosmic rays will cause him to evolve into a future version of humanity.

Pollard has built himself a cosmic-ray-concentrator that will allow him to evolve at the rate of 50 million years every 15 minutes exposure, but he needs someone else to operate it, which is why he has invited Wright and Dutton to his laboratory. Wright reluctantly agrees to operate Pollard's device.

Fifteen minutes in the device leave Pollard with enhanced intelligence and a highly developed physique. However, he is eager to continue the process and explore the further evolutionary changes mankind will undergo. The next stage, though, finds him with a huge bald head atop a frail body and atrophied emotions. He insists on continuing, and each stage of the process finds his brain larger and more powerful, and his body smaller and weaker. At each stage Pollard derides the previous stage as brutish and primitive, praises his current condition and looks forward to the next stage in his evolution.

After the third transformation, Pollard's ambition is to enslave humanity and turn the Earth into a vast laboratory for his own use, but as the transformations proceed he moves beyond such desires, with only intellectual curiosity remaining. The penultimate stage finds Pollard transformed into a vast, naked, telepathic brain that feeds on pure energy. A final use of the device, to Wright's shock, leaves Pollard a pool of protoplasm, apparently bringing the evolution of humanity full circle back to its beginning. Dutton goes mad with horror and wrecks the laboratory, and Wright barely pulls him out before it, and Pollard's house, go up in flames.

Dutton remains permanently mad, while Wright is left to wonder whether Pollard really has simply returned to humanity's starting point. "Or is this evolutionary cycle we saw a cycle in appearance only, is there some change that we cannot understand, above and beyond it? I do not know which of these possibilities is truth, but I do know that the first of them haunts me."

== Asimov's comments ==
As Asimov notes in Before the Golden Age, cosmic rays do indeed play a part in causing mutations, but they cause evolutionary changes in large populations rather than individual organisms. Though Pollard claims to have done "something no physicist has been able to do, to concentrate the cosmic rays and yet remove from them their harmful properties", this is merely handwaving. Subjecting oneself to a concentrated blast of cosmic rays would be fatal, which was noted by Asimov and was known even in the early 1930s.

== Cultural references ==
An episode of the Mighty Max television series, "Zygote Music", has a similar storyline, in which a scientist uses a machine to evolve. In the final stage, however, the scientist has been transformed into pure thought. He is defeated in a manner similar to the one used to prevent Pollard from taking over the Earth, namely, advancing his evolution until he is beyond such desires.

The Outer Limits episode "The Sixth Finger" features a character that is artificially evolved; according to David Schow's book The Outer Limits Companion, the original conclusion of the script precisely imitated "The Man Who Evolved," but was changed in later script revisions to simply restore the superhuman to his original human state.

Marvel Comics character MODOK and DC Comics character Hector Hammond are humans who were evolved into future beings with large heads. Other characters, in various Superman and Fantastic Four comics in the 1980s, used similar themes.

== Publication history ==
- Horror on the Asteroid and Other Tales of Planetary Horror, P. Allen, London, 1936.
- From Off This World, Leo Marguiles and Oscar J. Friend, eds., Merlin Press, 1949.
- Before the Golden Age: A Science Fiction Anthology of the 1930s - Book 1, Isaac Asimov, ed., Doubleday, 1974.
- The Best of Edmond Hamilton, Leigh Brackett, ed., Doubleday, 1977.
