= The Best of Frederik Pohl =

1975 collection of science fiction short stories by Frederik Pohl

- Cover of first edition
- Author: Frederik Pohl
- Cover artist: John Berkey
- Language: English
- Series: Ballantine's Classic Library of Science Fiction
- Genre: Science fiction
- Publisher: Doubleday
- Publication date: 1975
- Publication place: United States
- Media type: Print (hardcover)
- Pages: 306
- Preceded by: The Best of Henry Kuttner
- Followed by: The Best of Cordwainer Smith

The Best of Frederik Pohl is a collection of science fiction short stories by American author Frederik Pohl, edited by Lester del Rey. It was first published in hardcover by Nelson Doubleday in March 1975 as a selection of its Science Fiction Book Club, and in paperback by Ballantine Books in June of the same year as a volume in its Classic Library of Science Fiction, and reprinted in April 1976. The book was reissued in hardcover by Taplinger in 1977. The first British edition was issued in Hardcover in January 1977 by Sidgwick & Jackson, which later gathered it together with The Best of Harry Harrison (1976) into the omnibus volume Science Fiction Special 29 (1978). It has also been translated into Italian and German.

== Summary ==
The book contains nineteen short works of fiction and an afterword by the author, together with an introduction by editor Lester Del Rey.

== Contents ==
- "A Variety of Excellence" [introduction] (Lester del Rey)
- "The Tunnel Under the World" (from Galaxy Science Fiction, Jan. 1955)
- "Punch" (from Playboy, Jun. 1961)
- "Three Portraits and a Prayer" (from Galaxy Magazine, Aug. 1962)
- "Day Million" (from Rogue, Feb./Mar. 1966)
- "Happy Birthday, Dear Jesus" (from Alternating Currents, Feb. 1956)
- "We Never Mention Aunt Nora" (from Galaxy Science Fiction, Jul. 1958)
- "Father of the Stars" (from If, Nov. 1964)
- "The Day the Martians Came" (from Dangerous Visions, Oct. 1967)
- "The Midas Plague" (from Galaxy Science Fiction, Apr. 1954)
- "The Snowmen" (from Galaxy Magazine, Dec. 1959)
- "How to Count on Your Fingers" (from Science Fiction Stories, Sep. 1956)
- "Grandy Devil" (from Galaxy Science Fiction, Jun. 1955)
- "Speed Trap" (from Playboy, Nov. 1967)
- "The Richest Man in Levittown" (from Galaxy Magazine, Apr. 1959)
- "The Day the Icicle Works Closed" (from Galaxy Magazine, Feb. 1960)
- "The Hated" (from Galaxy Science Fiction, Jan. 1958)
- "The Martian in the Attic" (from If, Jul. 1960)
- "The Census Takers" (from The Magazine of Fantasy & Science Fiction, Feb. 1956)
- "The Children of Night" (from Galaxy Magazine, Oct. 1964)
- "What the Author Has to Say About All This" [afterword]

== Reception ==
The book was reviewed by James K. Burk in Delap's F & SF Review, August 1975, L. J. Knapp in The Science Fiction Review, August 1975, Philip Stephensen-Payne in Paperback Parlour, February 1977, and anonymously in Reclams Science Fiction Führer, 1982.

== Awards ==
The book placed fourteenth in the 1976 Locus Poll Award for Best Single Author Collection.
