= The Best of John Brunner =

1988 collection of short stories by John Brunner

- Cover of first edition
- Author: John Brunner
- Cover artist: Barclay Shaw
- Language: English
- Series: Ballantine's Classic Library of Science Fiction
- Genre: Science fiction
- Publisher: Ballantine/Del Rey
- Publication date: 1988
- Publication place: United States
- Media type: Print (paperback)
- Pages: xii, 288
- ISBN: 0-345-35307-2
- Preceded by: The Best of H. P. Lovecraft

The Best of John Brunner is a collection of science fiction short stories by British author John Brunner (1934–1995). It was first published in paperback by Ballantine/Del Rey in November 1988 as a volume in its Classic Library of Science Fiction.

== Summary ==
The book contains seventeen short works of fiction by the author, together with an introduction by Joe Haldeman.

== Contents ==
- "Introduction: The Brunner Mosaic" (Joe Haldeman)
- "The Totally Rich" (from Worlds of Tomorrow, Jun. 1963)
- "The Last Lonely Man" (from New Worlds SF no. 142, May/Jun. 1964)
- "Galactic Consumer Report No. 1: Inexpensive Time Machines" (from Galaxy Magazine, Dec. 1965)
- "Fair" (from New Worlds Science Fiction no. 45, Mar. 1956)
- "Such Stuff" (from The Magazine of Fantasy & Science Fiction, Jun. 1962)
- "Galactic Consumer Report No. 2: Automatic Twin-Tube Wishing Machines" (from Galaxy Magazine, Jun. 1966)
- "Tracking with Close-ups (21) and (23)" (excerpts from Stand on Zanzibar, 1968)
- "X-Hero" (from Omni, Mar. 1980)
- "No Future in It" (from Science Fantasy, Sep. 1955)
- "Galactic Consumer Report No. 3: A Survey of the Membership" (from Galaxy Magazine, Dec. 1967)
- "What Friends Are For" (from Fellowship of the Stars, 1974)
- "The Taste of the Dish and the Savor of the Day" (from The Magazine of Fantasy & Science Fiction, Aug. 1977)
- "Galactic Consumer Report No. 4: Thing-of-the-Month Clubs" (from Galaxy Magazine, Jan. 1969)
- "The Man Who Saw the Thousand-Year Reich" (from The Magazine of Fantasy & Science Fiction, Nov. 1981)
- "An Elixir for the Emperor" (from Fantastic Stories of Imagination, Nov. 1964)
- "The Suicide of Man" (from Isaac Asimov's Science Fiction Magazine, Jul./Aug. 1978)
- "The Vitanuls" (from The Magazine of Fantasy & Science Fiction, Jul. 1967)

== Reception ==
The book was reviewed by Tom Whitmore in Locus no. 334, November 1988.

== Awards ==
The book placed thirteenth in the 1989 Locus Poll Award for Best Collection.
