= The Best of Henry Kuttner =

1975 collection of short stories by Henry Kuttner

- Cover of first edition
- Author: Henry Kuttner
- Cover artist: Larry Kresek
- Language: English
- Series: Ballantine's Classic Library of Science Fiction
- Genre: Science fiction, fantasy
- Publisher: Doubleday
- Publication date: 1975
- Publication place: United States
- Media type: Print (hardback)
- Pages: xii, 338
- Preceded by: The Best of Fritz Leiber
- Followed by: The Best of Frederik Pohl

The Best of Henry Kuttner is a collection of science fiction and fantasy short stories by American author Henry Kuttner. It was first published in hardback by Nelson Doubleday in February 1975 and in paperback by Ballantine Books in April of the same year as a volume in its Classic Library of Science Fiction. The book was reissued in trade paperback by Del Rey/Ballantine in March 2007 under the alternate title The Last Mimzy: Stories. and in ebook by Gateway/Orion in May 2014 and Diversion Books in August 2014. It was later gathered together with Fury and Mutant into the omnibus collection Fury / Mutant / The Best of Henry Kuttner, issued in trade paperback and ebook by Gollancz in December 2013. It has also been translated into Spanish.

== Summary ==
The book contains seventeen short works of fiction by the author, together with an introduction by Ray Bradbury. Thirteen of the pieces, while credited to Kuttner alone, were silently co-authored by his wife, C. L. Moore. As originally published, some of the pieces appeared under pseudonyms, notably Lewis Padgett and Hudson Hastings.

== Contents ==
- "Henry Kuttner: A Neglected Master" (introduction) (Ray Bradbury)
- "Mimsy Were the Borogoves" (with C. L. Moore) (from Astounding Science-Fiction, Feb. 1943)
- "Two-Handed Engine" (with C. L. Moore) (from The Magazine of Fantasy and Science Fiction, August 1955)
- "The Proud Robot" (from Astounding Science-Fiction, October 1943)
- "The Misguided Halo" (from Unknown, August 1939)
- "The Voice of the Lobster" (from Thrilling Wonder Stories, February 1950)
- "Exit the Professor" (with C. L. Moore) (from Thrilling Wonder Stories, October 1947)
- "The Twonky" (with C. L. Moore) (from Astounding Science-Fiction, September 1942)
- "A Gnome There Was" (with C. L. Moore) (from Unknown Worlds, October 1941)
- "The Big Night" (from Thrilling Wonder Stories, June 1947)
- "Nothing But Gingerbread Left" (with C. L. Moore) (from Astounding Science-Fiction, January 1943)
- "The Iron Standard" (with C. L. Moore) (from Astounding Science-Fiction, December 1943)
- "Cold War" (with C. L. Moore) (from Thrilling Wonder Stories, October 1949)
- "Or Else" (with C. L. Moore) (from Ahead of Time, July 1953)
- "Endowment Policy" (with C. L. Moore) (from Astounding Science-Fiction, August 1943)
- "Housing Problem" (with C. L. Moore) (from Charm, October 1944)
- "What You Need" (with C. L. Moore) (from Astounding Science Fiction, October 1945)
- "Absalom" (with C. L. Moore) (from Startling Stories, Fall 1946)

== Relation to other works ==
Fifteen of the seventeen stories in the collection had previously been collected in the similarly titled British collections The Best of Kuttner 1 and The Best of Kuttner 2, issued by Mayflower-Dell in November 1965 and May 1966, respectively. These collections also include other Kuttner stories not included in The Best of Henry Kuttner.

== Reception ==
The book was reviewed by Baird Searles in The Science Fiction Review, April 1975, Sanford J. Cohen in Delap's F & SF Review, August 1975, Julián Díez (2001) in Las 100 mejores novelas de ciencia ficción del siglo XX, 2001, and Dorman T. Shindler in Subterranean Online, Spring 2007.

== Awards ==
The book placed sixth in the 1976 Locus Poll Award for Best Single Author Collection. "What You Need" was nominated for the 1996 Retro Hugo Award for Best Short Story. "The Twonky" won the 2018 Retro Hugo Award for Best Short Story. "Mimsy Were the Borogoves" won the 2019 Retro Hugo Award for Best Novelette; "The Proud Robot" was also nominated for the same award, while "Nothing But Gingerbread Left" and "The Iron Standard" were nominated for the 2019 Retro Hugo Award for Best Short Story. "Housing Policy" was nominated for the 2020 Retro Hugo Award for Best Short Story.
