= The Best of H. P. Lovecraft: Bloodcurdling Tales of Horror and the Macabre =

1982 collection of stories by American author H. P. Lovecraft

- Cover of first edition
- Author: H. P. Lovecraft
- Cover artist: Michael Whelan
- Language: English
- Series: Ballantine's Classic Library of Science Fiction
- Genre: Science fiction
- Publisher: Del Rey/Ballantine
- Publication date: 1982
- Publication place: United States
- Media type: Print (paperback)
- Pages: 375
- ISBN: 0-345-29468-8
- OCLC: 472780994
- Preceded by: The Best of James Blish
- Followed by: The Best of John Brunner

The Best of H. P. Lovecraft: Bloodcurdling Tales of Horror and the Macabre is a collection of stories by American author H. P. Lovecraft. It was first published in trade paperback by Del Rey/Ballantine in October 1982 as a volume in its Classic Library of Science Fiction, and reprinted in September 1988 and April 1995, with an ebook edition issued in November. 2002.

== Summary ==
The book contains sixteen short works of fiction by the author, together with an introduction, "Heritage of Horror" by Robert Bloch. Bloch's Introduction was reprinted as the Introduction to The Dunwich Horror and Others. (Arkham House, corrected 7th printing and later printings).

== Contents ==
- "Introduction: Heritage of Horror" (Robert Bloch)
- "The Rats in the Walls" (from Weird Tales, Mar. 1924)
- "The Picture in the House" (from The National Amateur, Jul. 1919)
- "The Outsider" (from Weird Tales, Apr. 1926)
- "Pickman's Model" (from Weird Tales, Oct. 1927)
- "In the Vault" (from The Tryout, Nov. 1925)
- "The Silver Key" (from Weird Tales, Jan. 1929)
- "The Music of Erich Zann" (from The National Amateur, Mar. 1922)
- "The Call of Cthulhu" (from Weird Tales, Feb. 1928)
- "The Dunwich Horror" (from Weird Tales, Apr. 1929)
- "The Whisperer in Darkness" (from Weird Tales, Aug. 1931)
- "The Colour Out of Space" (from Amazing Stories, Sep. 1927)
- "The Haunter of the Dark" (from Weird Tales, Dec. 1936)
- "The Thing on the Doorstep" (from Weird Tales, Jan. 1937)
- "The Shadow Over Innsmouth" (from The Shadow Over Innsmouth, Apr. 1936)
- "The Dreams in the Witch-House" (from Weird Tales, Jul. 1933)
- "The Shadow Out of Time" (from Astounding Stories, Jun. 1936)

== Reception ==
The book was reviewed by S. T. Joshi in Crypt of Cthulhu #11, Candlemas 1983, Baird Searles in Isaac Asimov's Science Fiction Magazine, February 1983, and David E. Schultz in Lovecraft Studies #8 Spring 1984.
