= The Best of Leigh Brackett =

1977 collection of science fiction short stories by Leigh Brackett

- Cover of first edition
- Author: Leigh Brackett
- Cover artist: Jack Woolhiser
- Language: English
- Series: Ballantine's Classic Library of Science Fiction
- Genre: Science fiction
- Publisher: Doubleday
- Publication date: 1977
- Publication place: United States
- Media type: Print (hardcover)
- Pages: xii, 363
- Preceded by: The Best of Edmond Hamilton
- Followed by: The Best of Robert Bloch

The Best of Leigh Brackett is a collection of science fiction short stories by American author Leigh Brackett, edited by her husband and fellow science fiction writer Edmond Hamilton. It was first published in hardcover by Nelson Doubleday in July 1977 and in paperback by Ballantine Books in September of the same year as a volume in its Classic Library of Science Fiction. A second hardcover edition was issued by Garland Publishing in March 1983, and Del Rey/Ballantine reprinted the paperback edition in June 1986. The book has been translated into German.

== Summary ==
The book contains ten short works of fiction with an afterword and two addenda by the author, together with an introduction by editor Edmond Hamilton and a map of Brackett's fictional version of Mars with an associated piece by Margaret Howes.

== Contents ==
- "Story-Teller of Many Worlds" [introduction] (Edmond Hamilton)
- "The Jewel of Bas" (from Planet Stories, Spring 1944)
- "The Vanishing Venusians" (from Planet Stories, Spring 1945)
- "The Veil of Astellar" (from Thrilling Wonder Stories, Spring 1944)
- "The Moon That Vanished" (from Thrilling Wonder Stories, Oct. 1948)
- "Enchantress of Venus" (from Planet Stories, Fall 1949)
- "The Woman from Altair" (from Startling Stories, Jul. 1951)
- "The Last Days of Shandakor" (from Startling Stories, Apr. 1952)
- "Shannach - The Last" (from Planet Stories, Nov. 1952)
- "The Tweener" (from The Magazine of Fantasy and Science Fiction, Feb. 1955)
- "The Queer Ones" (from Venture Science Fiction Magazine, Mar. 1957)
- "Afterword"
- "Addendum"
- "About the Maps of Mars"
- "Mars" (Margaret Howes)
- "Mars" [maps] (Margaret Howes)

== Reception ==
The book was reviewed by Algis Budrys in The Magazine of Fantasy and Science Fiction, Dec. 1977, Philippa Grove-Stephensen in Paperback Parlour, April 1978, and Brian Stableford in Vector 90, 1978.
