= The Best of Robert Bloch =

1977 collection of speculative fiction short stories by Robert Bloch

- Cover of first edition
- Author: Robert Bloch
- Cover artist: Paul Alexander
- Language: English
- Series: Ballantine's Classic Library of Science Fiction
- Genre: Speculative fiction
- Publisher: Del Rey/Ballantine
- Publication date: 1977
- Publication place: United States
- Media type: Print (paperback)
- Pages: xvii, 397
- ISBN: 0-345-25757-X
- OCLC: 2837325
- Preceded by: The Best of Leigh Brackett
- Followed by: The Best of Murray Leinster

The Best of Robert Bloch is a collection of speculative fiction short stories by American author Robert Bloch. It was first published in paperback by Del Rey/Ballantine in November 1977 as a volume in its Classic Library of Science Fiction. The book has been translated into German.

== Summary ==
The book contains twenty-two short works of fiction and an afterword by the author, together with an introduction by Lester del Rey.

== Contents ==
- "Robert Bloch: The Man Who Wrote Psycho" [introduction] (Lester del Rey)
- "Yours Truly, Jack the Ripper" (from Weird Tales, Jul. 1943)
- "Enoch" (from Weird Tales, Sep. 1946)
- "Catnip" (from Weird Tales, Mar. 1948)
- "The Hungry House" (from Imagination, Apr. 1951)
- "The Man Who Collected Poe" (from Famous Fantastic Mysteries, Oct. 1951)
- "Mr. Steinway" (from Fantastic, Apr. 1954)
- "The Past Master" (from The Blue Book Magazine, Jan. 1955)
- "I Like Blondes" (from Playboy, Jan. 1956)
- "All on a Golden Afternoon" (from The Magazine of Fantasy & Science Fiction, Jun. 1956)
- "Broomstick Ride" (from Super-Science Fiction, Dec. 1957)
- "Daybroke" (from Star Science Fiction, Jan. 1958)
- "Sleeping Beauty" (from Swank, Mar. 1958)
- "Word of Honor" (from Playboy, Aug. 1958)
- "The World-Timer" (from Fantastic Science Fiction Stories, Aug. 1960)
- "That Hell-Bound Train" (from The Magazine of Fantasy & Science Fiction, Sep. 1958)
- "The Funnel of God" (from Fantastic Science Fiction Stories, Jan. 1960)
- "Beelzebub" (from Playboy, Dec. 1963)
- "The Plot is the Thing" (from The Magazine of Fantasy & Science Fiction, Jul. 1966)
- "How Like a God" (from Galaxy Magazine, Apr. 1969)
- "The Movie People" (from The Magazine of Fantasy & Science Fiction, Oct. 1969)
- "The Oracle" (from Penthouse, May 1971)
- "The Learning Maze" (from The Learning Maze and Other Science Fiction, 1974)
- "Author's Afterword: "Will the Real Robert Bloch Please Stand Up?"

== Reception ==
Publishers Weekly characterizes Bloch as "about the most productively nasty-minded writer going, relishing his grue with an infectious delight," and the collection as "mostly fantasy, with some grim science fiction," noting that "[o]pening the book will be for most readers like opening a bag of potato chips—they'll be unlikely to close it until finished." "Yours Truly, Jack the Ripper," "The Man Who Collected Poe," "That Hell-Bound Train," and "The Movie People" are singled out for comment.

James McGlothlin on blackgate.com writes that "[t]hough Bloch is primarily remembered as a horror author today, The Best of Robert Bloch shows a wide range of talent that was clearly honed in the grist of the pulp days. Like several of these Del Rey 'Best ofs,' Bloch’s work represents a bygone era, but there is much to savor and experience from the pen of this great pulpster." While expecting, "given [Bloch's] association with Lovecraft, and his fame in connection with Psycho," the book "would tend to focus more on horror, or horror-related themes," McGlothlin notes that "Bloch wrote widely and in various genres," and a number of stories included "probably fit better with sci-fi, fantasy, or even fairy- or folktale," with some "actually sort of moral tales or [with] moral lessons or warning." These "tend [to] have a reassuring ring of the balances being righted," though others "are a bit more ambiguous and despairing." That said, "Bloch also has a witty humor that often comes out in his stories." In support of his analysis McGlothlin discusses six of the pieces, "Yours Truly, Jack the Ripper," "Catnip," "The Hungry House," "That Hell-Bound Train," "The Funnel of God," and "All on a Golden Afternoon" at some length. He concludes "I recommend The Best of Robert Bloch."

The book was also reviewed by Richard E. Geis in Science Fiction Review, February 1978, Philip Stephensen-Payne in Paperback Parlour, April 1978, and Uwe Anton in SF Perry Rhodan Magazin, 12/80.

== Awards ==
"Yours Truly, Jack the Ripper" was nominated for the 1944 Retro Hugo Award for Best Short Story in 2019. "That Hell-Bound Train" won the 1959 Hugo Award for Best Short Story. "The Plot is the Thing" was a preliminary nominee for the 1967 Nebula Award for Best Short Story.
