= The Best of Jack Williamson =

1978 collection of short stories by Jack Williamson

- Cover of first edition
- Author: Jack Williamson
- Cover artist: Ralph McQuarrie
- Language: English
- Series: Ballantine's Classic Library of Science Fiction
- Genre: Science fiction
- Publisher: Del Rey/Ballantine
- Publication date: 1978
- Publication place: United States
- Media type: Print (paperback)
- Pages: xiv, 386
- ISBN: 0-345-27335-4
- OCLC: 3994791
- Preceded by: The Best of L. Sprague de Camp
- Followed by: The Best of Raymond Z. Gallun

The Best of Jack Williamson is a collection of science fiction short stories by American author Jack Williamson. It was first published in paperback by Del Rey/Ballantine in June 1978 as a volume in its Classic Library of Science Fiction. It was reprinted by Del Rey Books in January 1984. The book has been translated into Italian and German.

== Summary ==
The book contains fourteen short works of fiction and an afterword by the author, together with an introduction by Frederik Pohl.

== Contents ==
- "Jack Williamson: The Pathfinder" [introduction] (Frederik Pohl)
- "The Metal Man" (from Amazing Stories, Dec. 1928)
- "Dead Star Station" (from Astounding Stories, Nov. 1933)
- "Nonstop to Mars" (from Argosy, Feb. 25, 1939)
- "The Crucible of Power" (from Astounding Science-Fiction, Feb. 1939)
- "Breakdown" (from Astounding Science-Fiction, Jan. 1942)
- "With Folded Hands" (from Astounding Science Fiction, Jul. 1947)
- "The Equalizer" (from Astounding Science Fiction, Mar. 1947)
- "The Peddler's Nose" (from Astounding Science Fiction, Apr. 1951)
- "The Happiest Creature" (from Star Science Fiction Stories no. 2, Dec. 1953)
- "The Cold Green Eye" (from Fantastic, Mar./Apr. 1953)
- "Operation: Gravity" (from Science-Fiction Plus, Oct. 1953)
- "Guinevere for Everybody" (from Star Science Fiction Stories no. 3, Jan. 1955)
- "Jamboree" (from Galaxy Magazine, Dec. 1969)
- "The Highest Dive" (from Science Fiction Monthly, Jan. 1976)
- "Afterword"

== Reception ==
The book was reviewed by P. J. Stevens in Australian SF News, December 1978, Mark Mansell in Science Fiction Review, March 1979, and Michael Adrian in Friedhof der Roboter, 1981.

== Awards ==
Williamson was nominated for the 2017 Prometheus Hall of Fame Award for "With Folded Hands," and won the award for 2018.
