= Small Changes =

Short story anthology by Hal Clement

- first edition cover
- Author: Hal Clement
- Cover artist: Richard Kapolka
- Language: English
- Genre: Science fiction
- Publisher: Doubleday Books
- Publication date: 1969
- Publication place: United States
- Media type: Print (hardback), mass-market paperback
- Pages: 230 pp
- OCLC: 36185

Small Changes is a collection of science fiction short stories by Hal Clement, published by Doubleday in 1969. It was issued in Great Britain by Robert Hale Publishing, and reprinted in paperback by Dell Books as Space Lash.

== Contents ==
- "Dust Rag" (Astounding 1956)
- "Sunspot" (Analog 1960)
- "Uncommon Sense" (Astounding 1945)
- "Trojan Fall" (Astounding 1944)
- "Fireproof" (Astounding 1949)
- "Halo" (Galaxy 1952)
- "The Foundling Stars" (If 1966)
- "Raindrop" (If 1965)
- "The Mechanic" (Analog 1966)

== Reception ==
Algis Budrys praised the collection, saying that "There is a charm to these stories . . . which defies critical analysis in the usual sense."
