= Vic Dunlop =

American actor

- Born: November 6, 1948; New York City, U.S.
- Died: August 13, 2011 (aged 62); Glendale, California, U.S.
- Spouse: Linda Dunlop

Comedy career
- Medium: Stand-up, television, film
- Genres: Character comedy, observational comedy, satire, surreal humor, sarcasm
- Subjects: American culture, everyday life, human behavior, pop culture

Vic Dunlop (November 6, 1948 – August 13, 2011) was an American stand-up comedian and film and television actor.

Dunlop gained national attention appearing in such television series and films as Make Me Laugh, Match Game-Hollywood Squares Hour, The Richard Pryor Show, Harper Valley PTA, Skatetown, U.S.A., The Devil and Max Devlin, Martians Go Home, Night Patrol and The Super Mario Bros. Super Show!.

Dunlop died August 13, 2011, at age 62 from complications of diabetes.
