= Iceworld =

1953 novel by Hal Clement

- Dust-jacket from the first edition
- Author: Hal Clement
- Cover artist: Ric Binkley
- Language: English
- Genre: Science fiction
- Publisher: Gnome Press
- Publication date: 1953
- Publication place: United States
- Media type: Print (Hardcover)
- Pages: 216
- OCLC: 1457433

Iceworld is a science fiction novel by American writer Hal Clement. It was published in 1953 by Gnome Press in an edition of 4,000 copies. The novel was originally serialized in the magazine Astounding in 1951.

== Plot ==
The novel concerns an interplanetary narcotics agent who is forced to work on an incredibly cold world (from his point of view) — so cold that the atmosphere he breathes, sulfur, is a yellow solid. The planet is in fact Earth, and he teams up with natives of the alien planet, humans, in his attempt to stop the smuggling of a dangerous drug (tobacco) to Sirius. Although the story involves both aliens and humans, it is told primarily from an alien perspective.

== Reception ==
Galaxy reviewer Groff Conklin characterized Iceworld as "believable, exciting, and satisfying." Boucher and McComas gave the novel a mixed review, saying that while it was "thinly plotted and characterized [and] hardly stirs wonder or any other emotion of good fiction," that Clement had "never done a better job of making plausible and scientifically convincing every detail of the physiology and technology of an alien race . . . so absorbingly created and described that you may well put up with an unfair amount of novelistic tedium." P. Schuyler Miller reported that "As an intellectual puzzle, it's top-rank stuff," but concluded that the difficulty in identifying with the alien protagonist would limit the novel's appeal."

== Sources ==
- Chalker, Jack L.; Mark Owings (1998). The Science-Fantasy Publishers: A Bibliographic History, 1923-1998. Westminster, MD and Baltimore: Mirage Press, Ltd. p. 302.
- Tuck, Donald H. (1978). The Encyclopedia of Science Fiction and Fantasy. Chicago: Advent. p. 412. ISBN 0-911682-22-8.
