= The Best of Edmond Hamilton =

1977 collection of science fiction short stories by Edmond Hamilton

- Cover of first edition
- Author: Edmond Hamilton
- Cover artist: Don Maitz
- Language: English
- Series: Ballantine's Classic Library of Science Fiction
- Genre: Science fiction
- Publisher: Doubleday
- Publication date: 1977
- Publication place: United States
- Media type: Print (hardback)
- Pages: xvii, 334
- Preceded by: The Best of Fredric Brown
- Followed by: The Best of Leigh Brackett

The Best of Edmond Hamilton is a collection of science fiction short stories by American author Edmond Hamilton, edited by his wife and fellow science fiction writer Leigh Brackett. It was first published in hardback by Nelson Doubleday in April 1977 and in paperback by Ballantine Books in August of the same year as a volume in its Classic Library of Science Fiction. The book was reissued in trade paperback and ebook editions by Phoenix Pick in November 2010. It has also been translated into German.

== Summary ==
The book contains twenty-one short works of fiction by the author, together with an introduction by the editor and an afterword by the author.

== Contents ==
- "Fifty Years of Wonder" (introduction) (Leigh Brackett)
- "The Monster-God of Mamurth" (from Weird Tales, Aug. 1926)
- "The Man Who Evolved" (from Wonder Stories, Apr. 1931)
- "A Conquest of Two Worlds" (from Wonder Stories, Feb. 1932)
- "The Island of Unreason" (from Wonder Stories, May 1933)
- "Thundering Worlds" (from Weird Tales, Mar. 1934)
- "The Man Who Returned" (from Weird Tales, Feb. 1934)
- "The Accursed Galaxy" (from Astounding Stories, Jul. 1935)
- "In the World's Dusk" (from Weird Tales, Mar. 1936)
- "Child of the Winds" (from Weird Tales, May 1936)
- "The Seeds from Outside" (from Weird Tales, Mar. 1937)
- "Fessenden's Worlds" (from Weird Tales, Apr. 1937)
- "Easy Money" (from Thrilling Wonder Stories, Apr. 1938)
- "He That Hath Wings" (from Weird Tales, Jul. 1938)
- "Exile" (from Super Science Stories, May 1943)
- "Day of Judgment" (from Weird Tales, Sep. 1946)
- "Alien Earth" (from Thrilling Wonder Stories, Apr. 1949)
- "What's It Like Out There?" (from Thrilling Wonder Stories, Dec. 1952)
- "Requiem" (from Amazing Stories, Apr. 1962)
- "After a Judgement Day" (from Fantastic Stories of Imagination, Dec. 1963)
- "The Pro" (from The Magazine of Fantasy & Science Fiction, Oct. 1964)
- "Castaway" (from The Man Who Called Himself Poe, 1969)
- "Afterword"

== Reception ==
Lester del Rey in Analog Science Fiction/Science Fact calls the author "one of science fiction's favorite old masters," writing that "Hamilton is at his best in his shorter fiction, and these selections bear little relation to what the readers some of his pulp novels might expect. They are quieter stories, done with far more care in most cases than he could expend on most of his longer work. Here the writing is sharp and economical, and the ideas shape the form of the story, rather than being shaped to fit commercial needs." He singles out "In the World's Dusk," "Child of the Winds," "He That Hath Wings," and "Castaway" for particular comment.

The book was also reviewed by Algis Budrys in The Magazine of Fantasy & Science Fiction, November 1977, Darrell Schweitzer in Science Fiction Review, November 1977, Philip Stephensen-Payne in Paperback Parlour, April 1978, Brian Stableford in Vector 90, 1978, Michael Adrian in Stadt in der Wüste, 1980, Reclams Science Fiction Führer, 1982, Maik in Perry Rhodan no. 898, 1983, and E. F. Bleiler in The Guide to Supernatural Fiction, 1983.
