= Isaac's Universe =

Isaac's Universe is a collaborative fictional universe created by Isaac Asimov in 1990, as a shared setting to be used by his fellow science fiction writers.

The project was proposed by Asimov's friend Martin H. Greenberg, who edited three Avon collections of short stories in the setting between 1990 and 1992. Two DAW novels – by Hal Clement and Asimov's wife Janet Asimov – followed in 1993 and 1995.

== Setting ==
The Milky Way Galaxy in the future is populated by six space-faring species, a response by Asimov "to criticisms that he had rarely dealt with aliens":

- Erthumoi: Human beings, who have colonized many planets beyond Earth and have extended their lifespans with rejuvenation treatments.
- Cephallonians: An aquatic species who live in water-filled spaceships, described by Asimov as vaguely analogous to porpoises.
- Locrians: A skeletal, insect-like species, adapted to a low-oxygen atmosphere with neon rather than nitrogen.
- Naxians: Limbless, snake-like beings, able to read the emotional state of individuals from any organic species just by observing them.
- Crotonites: A small winged species who live in an atmosphere poisonous to the other species, and who consider the other species inferior and look on them with contempt.
- Samians: Physically powerful, slow-moving, block-like creatures with no appendages who live on a high-gravity planet.

Robert Silverberg, who contributed the first Isaac's Universe story, expanded the setting with a seventh, mysterious race: unseen, but the source of artifacts found throughout the galaxy.

== Contents ==
=== Anthologies ===
1. The Diplomacy Guild, edited by Martin H. Greenberg (1990)
  - Robert Silverberg, "They Seek, We Hide"
  - David Brin, "The Diplomacy Guild"
  - Robert Sheckley, "Myryx"
  - Poul Anderson, "The Burning Sky"
  - Harry Turtledove, "Island of the Gods"
2. Phases in Chaos, edited by Martin H. Greenberg (1991)
  - Allen Steele, "Mecca"
  - Harry Turtledove, "Thirty Pieces"
  - Hal Clement, "Phases in Chaos"
  - Karen Haber, "The Soul of Truth",
  - Lawrence Watt-Evans, "Keep the Faith"
  - Janet Kagan, "Winging It"
  - George Alec Effinger,"The Reinvention of War"
  - Poul Anderson, "Woodcraft"
3. Unnatural Diplomacy, edited by Martin H. Greenberg (1992)
  - Harry Turtledove, "Breakups"
  - Lawrence Watt-Evans, "One Man's Meat"
  - Janet Kagan, "Fighting Words"
  - George Alec Effinger, "Water of Life"
  - Hal Clement's "Eyeball Vectors"
  - Rebecca Ore, "Liquid Assets"
  - Karen Haber, "Unnatural Diplomacy"

=== Novels ===
- Fossil by Hal Clement (1993)
- Murder at the Galactic Writers' Society by Janet Asimov (1995)

For Love and Glory
- First edition
- Author: Poul Anderson
- Cover artist: Vincent Di Fate
- Language: English
- Genre: Science fiction
- Publisher: Tor Books
- Publication date: March 2003
- Publication place: United States
- Media type: Print (Hardcover)
- Pages: 300
- ISBN: 0-312-87449-9

=== Related ===
- For Love and Glory by Poul Anderson (2003)

Anderson's last novel was an adaptation and expansion of his Isaac's Universe stories "The Burning Sky" and "Woodcraft". In the novel's acknowledgements, Anderson noted that he had substantially altered his stories for publication in this edition – including changes to names, characters and setting – so as not to conflict with the original anthologies, or inhibit authors who might use the setting in future. The plotline involves the discovery of an artifact created by a mysterious forerunner race.

== Reception ==
Science fiction scholar Gary Westfahl defined Isaac's Universe as a shared universe in the narrow sense of a "deliberate creation of a hitherto-unknown setting for writers to employ in original stories". In his estimation, Isaac's Universe is distinguished by "the unusual quality of writers" who contributed to it, a testament of Asimov's unique status in the genre.

Speculative fiction researcher Anne Besson counted the open creation of Isaac's Universe as an instance where Asimov has put his notoriety to the service in the genre. While Besson considered the project overall a mixed success, she, like Westfahl, saw this as a good example of a cycle of fiction which is deliberately set up to go beyond one author. The experienced Asimov provided a fixed framework, and other and younger writers could work with this common universe, so that it ends up seeming limitless.

Patricia Monk saw Isaac's Universe as "a new megatext" created by Asimov for new writers to expand, following the opening up of the Robot series to other authors. Monk pointed out the discrepancy between the design of Isaac's Universe as an invitation to beginners in the field, and the actual participation by distinguished writers.
