= John J. Pierce =

American novelist

John Jeremy Pierce (born 1941) is an American science fiction editor, historian and critic.

== Career ==
Pierce published the science fiction fanzine Renaissance from 1968 through 1974, and was an outspoken critic of the New Wave. In the 1970s he edited The Best of Murray Leinster, The Best of Cordwainer Smith and The Best of Raymond Z. Gallun for Del Rey Books. In 1977–78, he was named editor of Galaxy at a time when the magazine was in financial trouble, an experience he later recounted in Thirteen Months of Torment.

After leaving Galaxy, Pierce focused on a four-volume (1987–1994) critical history of science fiction under the general title, "A Study in Imagination and Evolution", adopting a conceptual framework, as opposed to a strictly chronological approach, and using parallels with biological evolution and dialectics to characterize the evolution of the genre as a whole. As of 2012, he was working on a revised and updated version.

He has written critical essays and book introductions on Cordwainer Smith, and essays on Twin Peaks and The X-Files for the fanzines Wrapped in Plastic and Spectrum and has had other articles published in The New York Review of Science Fiction and Science Fiction Studies. Besides works related to science fiction and popular culture, he is the author of a family history, The Children of Levi Peacock (2002).

== Personal life ==
Pierce is the son of John Robinson Pierce, the engineer, scientist (and science fiction writer) who coined the word "transistor". He is married to Marcia (née Feinbaum), widow of Arata Suzuki, and lives in Ramsey, New Jersey. He works as an editor at two trade magazines, Private Label and Quick Frozen Foods International.
