= Martians Go Home (film) =

1990 film by David Odell

- Theatrical release poster
- Directed by: David Odell
- Screenplay by: Charles S. Haas
- Based on: Martians, Go Home by Fredric Brown
- Produced by: Michael Pariser
- Starring: Randy Quaid; Margaret Colin; Barry Sobel; Vic Dunlop; John Philbin; Anita Morris
- Cinematography: Peter Deming
- Edited by: Kathryn Campbell
- Music by: Allan Zavod
- Distributed by: Taurus Entertainment
- Release dates: October 1989 (MIFED); April 20, 1990 (United States)
- Running time: 89 minutes
- Country: United States
- Language: English
- Box office: $129,778

Martians Go Home is a 1989 American science fiction comedy film starring Randy Quaid. It was directed by David Odell and written by Charles S. Haas, based on the 1954 novel of the same name by Fredric Brown. The film stars Randy Quaid, Margaret Colin, Anita Morris, Barry Sobel, Vic Dunlop, and John Philbin.

== Plot ==
After years of pursuing an unsuccessful jazz career, Mark Deveraux took several jobs writing TV show themes and commercial jingles to earn a living; while successful in acquiring steady work, he wishes to write meaningful music. After winning out over several more experienced composers to score a science fiction film, he spends a weekend in a cabin trying to develop a song that sounds like a "universal greeting" based on the producer's instruction. After composing something he believes is worthwhile, he calls his girlfriend, the producer for an internationally syndicated talk radio show, who accidentally broadcasts the song.

The following day, while recovering from a hangover, Devereaux is visited by a Martian who claims that they heard the greeting and have come to Earth to establish lasting peace and prosperity on the planet—only to immediately recant and state that he was joking. He claims that "Mars is a dump" and that the billions of bored Martians have decided to come to Earth and to have fun at humanity's expense. Devereaux tries to shoot him, but discovers that the Martian has the ability to both read minds and teleport, allowing him to predict and dodge any attack. Around the globe, billions of Martians begin to wreak havoc with their abilities, revealing intimate secrets, appearing and disrupting major sporting events, and voyeuristically spying on couples who are having sex (as they cannot reproduce sexually).

Deveraux realizes that they felt 'invited' by his music and interrupts another national broadcast to play the song again—realizing too late that he needs to play it in reverse. Feigning insanity, he is committed to a psychiatric hospital where his girlfriend eventually breaks him free. Trying again, they hijack another international broadcast while Devereaux plays the song backwards. In spite of numerous distractions and ploys by the Martians, he succeeds and the Martians simultaneously disappear from around the globe. Having realized that he has talent, a short time later he quits his jobs for Hollywood and reforms his Jazz quartet to go on the road.

== Cast ==
- Randy Quaid as Mark Devereaux
- Margaret Colin as Sara Brody
- Anita Morris as Dr. Jane Buchanan
- Barry Sobel as Main Martian #1
- Vic Dunlop as Main Martian #2
- John Philbin as Donny
- Ronny Cox as the President
- Timothy Stack as Seagrams
- Bruce French as Elgins
- Gerrit Graham as Stan Garrett
- Dean Devlin as Joe Fledermaus
- Roy Brocksmith as Mr. Kornheiser
- Nicky Katt as Hippie
- Troy Evans as Cop
- Steve Blacknell as Game Show Host
- Allan Katz as Melvin Knudson
- Cynthia Ettinger as Dr. Jane's Patient
- Brent Hinkley as Dr. Jane's Patient
- Rob Schneider as Voyeur Martian #1
- Wallace Langham as Voyeur Martian #2

== Release ==
In Italy, it was marketed as a sequel to Spaceballs (known as Balle Spaziali 2: La Vendetta, or Spaceballs 2: Revenge).

== Reception ==
=== Critical response ===
Caryn James of The New York Times wrote: One of the ideas behind Martians Go Home is that Mars is inhabited by green-faced creatures who sound like second-rate, mildly obnoxious stand-up comics. Take a screeching comedian like Sam Kinison, tone down his act and paint him green, and you'll have a fair idea of this movie's quaint notion of alien humor."

Kevin Thomas of the Los Angeles Times wrote: "Martians Go Home (citywide), a strange little sci-fi comedy that's all talk and no action, starts off with such a knowing satire of the ways of Hollywood that it's a shame those green people from Mars ever turn up."

== See also ==
- List of films featuring extraterrestrials
- Mars in fiction
