= Michael ffolkes =

British illustrator and cartoonist

"Brilliant technique, but he has nothing to say..."

Brian Davis (6 June 1925 – 18 October 1988), known professionally as Michael ffolkes, was a British illustrator and cartoonist most famous for his work on the Peter Simple column in The Daily Telegraph. He also worked for Punch and Playboy.

== Life ==
Davis was born in London on 6 June 1925. He studied art at Saint Martin's School of Art, and in 1942 sold his first drawing to Punch, signing it "brian". He was a telegraphist with the Royal Navy during World War II. He went on to study painting at the Chelsea School of Art and later adopted "Michael ffolkes" as his artistic name after being inspired by a name he read in Burke's Peerage. He began his career in 1949. He typically signed his cartoons as "ffolkes" in an all-lowercase style. In 1955, ffolkes began to illustrate the "Way of the World" column in The Daily Telegraph. In 1961, he began illustrating Punch film reviews, and later its covers.

He contributed to such newspapers and magazines as The Strand Magazine, Lilliput, The Daily Telegraph, The Spectator, The Sunday Telegraph, Playboy, Private Eye, The New Yorker, Reader's Digest, Krokodil, and Esquire. He was a prolific illustrator of children's books, in particular those of Roald Dahl, and published his autobiography, ffundamental ffolkes, in 1985.

== Personal life and death ==
Davis married Miriam Boxer in 1953; they had two children and divorced in 1971. He then married Sophie Kemp in 1972, with whom he had a daughter before divorcing in 1981. In his later years, he was in a relationship with Elfa Kramers.

He died from acute pancreatitis and cirrhosis at Lister Hospital in London on 18 October 1988, at the age of 63.
