= Uncommon Sense =

1945 short story by Hal Clement

"Uncommon Sense" is a 1945 science fiction short story by American writer Hal Clement. In 1996, it was retrospectively awarded the 1946 Hugo Award for Best Short Story.

== Publication history ==
"Uncommon Sense" was first published in the September 1945 edition of Astounding Science Fiction and included in Clement's 1969 collection Small Changes. Subsequently, it was published in Nebula Awards Showcase 2000. The story was the first of Hal Clement's "Laird Cunningham" series, followed by "The Logical Life" in 1974, "Stuck With It" in 1976 and "Status Symbol" in 1987. In February 2000, all four stories were re-published in The Essential Hal Clement, Volume 2: Music of Many Spheres.

== Plot ==
Laird Cunningham is a rich man who enjoys travelling to distant worlds in search of bizarre life forms. On the trip told in this story, Cunningham overhears the plotting of his two assistants to loot the ship. To avoid this, he forces a crash landing on an unnamed planet, sabotages the ship and escapes, leaving his assistants in the ship.

Cunningham goes exploring and finds that the planet is very strange and orbits one of the fiercest suns in the galaxy (Deneb). The planet itself is quite similar to Earth's Moon, being airless and of a similar size, but due to the daily heating by its sun, the terrain is very different and appears strangely windswept. Cunningham also investigates the local life forms which include plants, herbivores, and carnivores. He dissects a few of the animals and finds that they have liquid metal for blood and that their eyes are more like noses, in that their eyes function as pinhole cameras with respect to the local gas molecules, which in the near vacuum travel in essentially straight lines like light rays. Cunningham realises that the animals navigate mostly by smell, since the extremely bright, undiffused sunlight would hamper an optical sense.

Taking refuge in a cave, Cunningham watches his ship and his assistants as they attempt to repair it, welding up cracks in the ship's hull. However, they only work during the day and return to the inside of the ship at night. By night, Cunningham kills animals and collects their blood in grooves in the cave floor. The blood freezes in the cold of the night and he attaches the resulting small bars of metal to the remaining cracks in his ship's hull. The next morning, his assistants emerge to continue welding, which melts the bars of blood. The smell attracts many local predators, and Cunningham makes his way onto the ship in the commotion. Although the assistants easily fight off the alien animals, Cunningham locks them in the airlock as they attempt to return to the ship. He then sends out a distress call and sits back, as rescue will arrive in several hours.

== Reception ==
The SF Site described "Uncommon Sense" as a classic hard science fiction work, in which the story is predicated "on the protagonist's ability to solve a scientific puzzle in the context of the conditions of an alien world."
