= Hal Clement =

American author and artist (1922–2003)

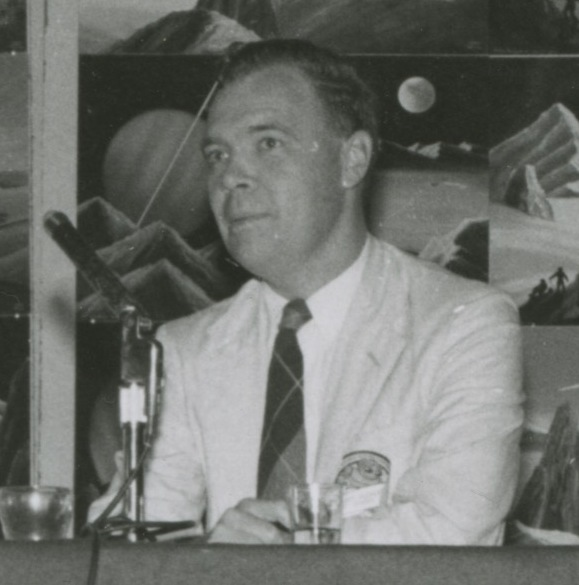
- Born: Harry Clement Stubbs; May 30, 1922; Somerville, Massachusetts, U.S.
- Died: October 29, 2003 (aged 81); Milton, Massachusetts, U.S.
- Education: Harvard University (BS); Boston University (MEd); Simmons College (MS)
- Occupations: Novelist; military pilot; science teacher
- Writing career
- Pen name: George Richard (as artist)
- Period: 1942–2003
- Genre: Science fiction
- Notable works: Mission of Gravity; "Uncommon Sense"
- Movement: Hard science fiction

Harry Clement Stubbs (May 30, 1922 – October 29, 2003), better known by the pen name Hal Clement, was an American science fiction writer and a leader of the hard science fiction subgenre. He also painted astronomically oriented artworks under the name George Richard.

In 1998, Clement was inducted into the Science Fiction and Fantasy Hall of Fame. (Note: As living inductees Clement and Frederik Pohl were preceded in the Hall of Fame by A. E. van Vogt and Jack Williamson, Arthur C. Clarke and Andre Norton.) He was named the 17th SFWA Grand Master by the Science Fiction and Fantasy Writers of America in 1999.

== Biography ==
Harry Clement Stubbs was born in Somerville, Massachusetts, on May 30, 1922.

He went to Harvard, graduating with a B.S. in astronomy in 1943. While there he wrote his first published story, "Proof", which appeared in the June 1942 issue of Astounding Science Fiction, edited by John W. Campbell; three more appeared in later 1942 numbers. His further educational background includes an M.Ed. (Boston University 1946) and M.S. in chemistry (Simmons College 1963).

During World War II Clement was a pilot and copilot of a B-24 Liberator and flew 35 combat missions over Europe with the 68th Bomb Squadron, 44th Bomb Group, based in England with 8th Air Force. After the war, he served in the United States Air Force Reserve, and retired with the rank of colonel. He taught chemistry and astronomy for many years at Milton Academy in Milton, Massachusetts.

From 1949 to 1953, Clement's first three novels were two-, three-, and four-part Astounding serials under Campbell: Needle (Doubleday, 1950), Iceworld (Gnome Press, 1953), and Mission of Gravity (1954), his best-known novel, published by Doubleday's Science Fiction Book Club (established 1953). The latter novel features a land and sea expedition across the superjovian planet Mesklin to recover a stranded scientific probe. The natives of Mesklin are centipede-like intelligent beings about 50 centimeters long. Various episodes hinge on the fact that Mesklin's fast rotational speed causes it to be considerably deformed from the spherical, with effective surface gravity that varies from approximately 3 g_{n} at the equator to approximately 700 g_{n} at the poles.

Clement's article "Whirligig World" describes his approach to writing a science fiction story:

Writing a science fiction story is fun, not work. ... the fun ... lies in treating the whole thing as a game.... [T]he rules must be quite simple. They are; for the reader of a science-fiction story, they consist of finding as many as possible of the author's statements or implications which conflict with the facts as science currently understands them. For the author, the rule is to make as few such slips as he possibly can... Certain exceptions are made [e.g., to allow travel faster than the speed of light], but fair play demands that all such matters be mentioned as early as possible in the story...

Clement was a frequent guest at science fiction conventions, especially in the eastern United States, where he usually presented talks and slide shows about writing and astronomy.

Clement died in his sleep in Massachusetts at the Milton Hospital on October 29, 2003, at age 81.

== Awards and honors ==
Clement has been honored several times for his cumulative contributions including 1998 Hall of Fame induction, when Clement and Frederik Pohl were the fifth and sixth living persons honored, and the 1999 SFWA Grand Master Award.

For the 1945 short story "Uncommon Sense" he received a 50-year Retro Hugo Award at the 1996 World Science Fiction Convention. Mission of Gravity, first published as a serial during 1953, was named best foreign novel by the Spanish Science Fiction Association in 1994 and it was a finalist for a 50-year Retro Hugo Award in 2004.

The Hal Clement Award for Young Adults for Excellence in Children's Science Fiction Literature was presented in Clement's name from 1992 to 2016.

Wayne Barlowe illustrated two of Clement's fictional species, the Abyormenites and the Mesklinites, in his Barlowe's Guide to Extraterrestrials.

== Short stories, novelettes and novellas ==
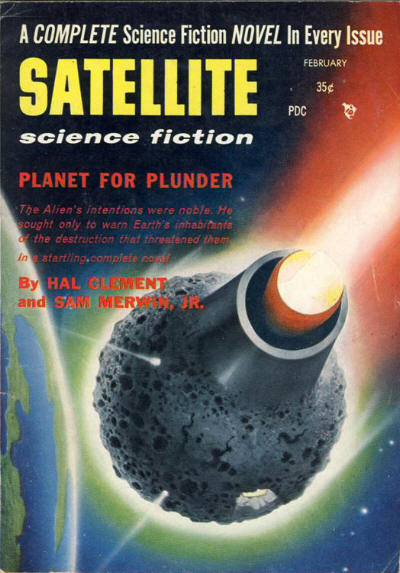
Editor Sam Merwin Jr. added 10,000 words to Clement's novella "Planetfall" for its publication in the February 1957 issue of Satellite Science Fiction as "Planet for Plunder".

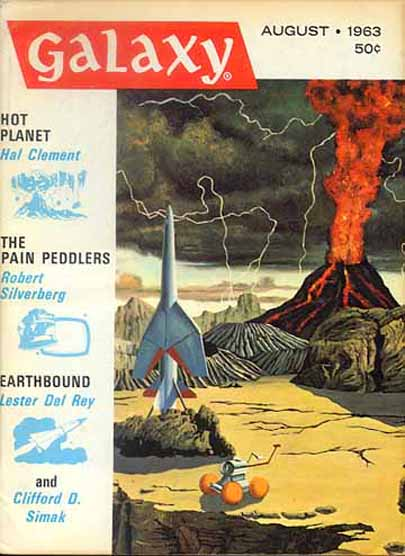
Clement's short story "Hot Planet" took the cover of the August 1963 issue of Galaxy Science Fiction.

- "Proof" (June 1942). Short story. Published in Astounding. Collected in The Essential Hal Clement Volume 2, Possible Worlds of Science Fiction (1951), SF: Author's Choice 2 (1970), Where Do We Go From Here? (1971), The Great SF Stories 4 (1942) (1980), First Voyages (1981), The Golden Years of Science Fiction (Second Series) (1983), Encounters (1988), Ascent of Wonder (1994) and Wondrous Beginnings (2003).
- Impediment (August 1942). Novelette. Published in Astounding. Collected in Natives of Space, The Best of Hal Clement and The Essential Hal Clement Volume 2.
- Avenue of Escape (November 1942). Published in Astounding's series Probability Zero. Collected in The Essential Hal Clement Volume 2.
- "Attitude" (September 1943). Novella. Published in Astounding. Collected in The Essential Hal Clement Volume 2 and Travellers of Space (1951).
- Technical Error" (January 1944). Novelette. Published in Astounding. Collected in Natives of Space, The Best of Hal Clement and The Essential Hal Clement Volume 2.
- "Trojan Fall" (June 1944). Short story. Published in Astounding. Collected in Small Changes.
- "Uncommon Sense" (September 1945). His most famous short story. Part of the Laird Cunningham Series. Hugo Award for Best Short Story of 1945. Published in Astounding. Collected in Small Changes, The Best of Hal Clement, Intuit, The Essential Hal Clement Volume 2, The Old Masters Archived June 30, 2015, at the Wayback Machine (1970), Out of This World 10 Archived March 9, 2015, at the Wayback Machine (1973) and Nebula Awards Showcase 2000 (2000).
- "Cold Front" (July 1946). Novelette. Published in Astounding. Collected in The Essential Hal Clement Volume 2, Men Against the Stars (1950, 1956) and Astounding Stories: The 60th Anniversary Collection, Vol. 2 (1990).
- Assumption Unjustified (October 1946). Novelette. Published in Astounding. Collected in Natives of Space, The Best of Hal Clement and Crossroads in Time Archived August 19, 2014, at the Wayback Machine (1953).
- "Answer" (April 1947). Short story. Published in Astounding SF. Collected in The Best of Hal Clement and Science Fiction Thinking Machines (1954).
- "Fireproof" (March 1949). Short story. Published in Astounding. Collected in Small Changes, Decade of the 1940s (1975) and Combat SF (1981).
- "Halo" (October 1952). Novelette. Published in Galaxy. Collected in Small Changes, The Essential Hal Clement Volume 2 and Shadow of Tomorrow Archived March 11, 2015, at the Wayback Machine (1953).
- "Critical Factor" (1953). Short story not included in any of the Hal Clement's compilations. Published in Star Science Fiction Stories #2 Archived March 11, 2015, at the Wayback Machine (1953). Collected in Titan 4 (1977) and The Road to Science Fiction #3: From Heinlein to here (1979).
- "Ground" (December 1953). Short story not included in any of the Hal Clement's compilations. Published in Science Fiction Adventures.
- "Dust Rag" (September 1956). Short story. Published in Astounding. Collected in Small Changes, The Best of Hal Clement, Where Do We Go From Here? (1971) and The Prentice Hall Anthology of Science Fiction and Fantasy (2001).
- "Planet for Plunder" (February 1957). Published in Satellite SF jointly with Sam Merwin Jr. A previous version of "Planetfall". Collected in Men of the Morning Star/Planet for Plunder.
- "The Lunar Lichen" (February 1960). Novelette not included in any of the Hal Clement's compilations. Published in Future Science Fiction. Collected in The Time Trap/The Lunar Lichen.
- "Sun Spot" (November 1960). Short story. Published in Analog. Collected in Small Changes, The Essential Hal Clement Volume 2, Isaac Asimov’s Wonderful Worlds of Science Fiction # 4: Comets (1986) and Analog’s Expanding Universe
- "The Green World" (May 1963). Novella not included in any of the Hal Clement's compilations. Published in If. Collected in The Moon is Hell!/The Green World.
- "Hot Planet" (August 1963). Novelette not included in any of the Hal Clement's compilations to date. Published in Galaxy. Collected in The 9th Annual of the Year's Best SF (1964), Spectrum 4 (1965), The Eighth Galaxy Reader Archived June 16, 2011, at the Wayback Machine (1965), Isaac Asimov Presents the Great SF Stories #25 (1963) (1992) and Science Fiction Century (1997).
- "Raindrop" (May 1965). Novelette. Published in If. Collected in Small Changes, The Essential Hal Clement Volume 2 and Isaac Asimov’s Wonderful Worlds of Science Fiction # 4: Comets.
- "The Foundling Stars" (August 1966). Short story. Published in If. Collected in Small Changes and The Second If Reader of Science Fiction (1968).
- "The Mechanic" (September 1966). Novelette. Published in Analog. Collected in Small Changes, The Essential Hal Clement Volume 2 and Analog: Writers’ Choice, Volume II (1984).
- "Bulge" (September 1968). Novelette. Published in If. Collected in Small Changes and The Essential Hal Clement Volume 2.
- '"Planetfall" (1972). Original version of "Planet for Plunder" (1957). Published in Strange Tomorrows (1972). Collected in The Essential Hal Clement Volume 2.
- "Lecture Demonstration" (1973). Short story from the Mesklin Series (of Mission of Gravity fame). Published in the book Astounding (1973). Collected in The Essential Hal Clement Volume 3, Heavy Planet and Mission of Gravity Archived September 19, 2015, at the Wayback Machine (1978).
- "Mistaken for Granted" (January/February 1974). Novella. Published in Worlds of If. Collected in The Best of Hal Clement.
- "The Logical Life" (1974). Second short story in the Laird Cunningham Series. Published in Stellar #1 (1974). Collected in Intuit and The Essential Hal Clement Volume 2.
- "Question of Guilt" (1976). Novelette. Published in The Year's Best Horror Stories: Series IV (1976). Collected in The Best of Hal Clement.
- "Stuck with It" (1976). Novelette in the Laird Cunningham Series. Published in Stellar #2 Archived October 2, 2020, at the Wayback Machine (1976). Collected in The Best of Hal Clement, Intuit and The Essential Hal Clement Volume 2.
- "Longline" (1976). Novelette. Published in Faster than Light (1976). Collected in The Essential Hal Clement Volume 2.
- "Seasoning" (September/October 1978). Novelette set in Harlan Ellison's Medea world. Not included in any of Hal Clement's compilations. Published in IASFM. Collected in Medea: Harlan's World (1985) and Aliens and UFO's (1993).
- "Status Symbol" (1987). Novelette, the last story in the Laird Cunningham Series. Published in Intuit. Collected in The Essential Hal Clement Volume 2.
- "Blot" (1989). Novelette about Asimov's positronic robots. Not included in any of Hal Clement's compilations to date. Published in Foundation's Friends (1989).
- "Phases in Chaos'" (1991). Novella not included in any of Hal Clement's compilations. Published in Isaac’s Universe Volume Two: Phases in Chaos.
- "Eyeball Vectors" (1992). Novella not included in any of Clement's compilations to date. Published in Isaac's Universe Volume 3: Unnatural Diplomacy.
- "Sortie" (spring/summer 1994). First part of the Sortie series. Novella not included in any of Hal Clement's compilations to date. Published in Harsh Mistress.
- "Settlement" (fall/winter 1994). Second part of the Sortie series. Novella not included in any of Clement's compilations. Published in Absolute Magnitude.
- "Seismic Sidetrack" (spring 1995). Third part of the Sortie series. Novella not included in any of Hal Clement's compilations to date. Published in Absolute Magnitude.
- "Simile" (summer 1995). Fourth and last part of the Sortie series. Novella not included in any of Hal Clement's compilations. Published in Absolute Magnitude.
- "Oh, Natural" (spring 1998). Novelette not included in any of Hal Clement's compilations. Published in Absolute Magnitude. Collected in Hal's Worlds: Stories and Essays in Memory of Hal Clement.
- Options" (1998). Short story not included in any of Clement's compilations to date. Published as Harry C. Stubbs in Lamps on the Brow.
- "Exchange Rate" (winter 1999). Novella not included in any of Hal Clement's compilations to date. Published in Absolute Magnitude. Collected in The Year’s Best Science Fiction: Seventeenth Annual Collection and The Hard SF Renaissance (2002).
- "Under" (January 2000). Short story, last story in the 'Mesklin series. Published in Analog. Collected in The Essential Hal Clement Volume 3 and Heavy Planet.
- "Office politics" (2003). Short story not included in any of Clement's compilations. Published in Readercon 15 Souvenir Book (This may be an article and not a fiction story)

== Books ==
- Needle (1950), ISBN 0-380-00635-9 (The first novel in the Needle series. Also published as From Outer Space. Published as young adult fiction although it includes abstract hard science fiction.)
- Iceworld (1953), ISBN 0-345-25805-3
- Mission of Gravity (1954), ISBN 0-345-31622-3 (first book in the Mesklin series).
- The Ranger Boys in Space (1956) (for children)
- Cycle of Fire (1957), ISBN 0-345-24368-4
- Close to Critical (1958), ISBN 0-345-24508-3 (part of the Mesklin series. Magazine publication in 1958, book in 1964)
- Natives of Space (1965), ISBN 0345219503 (three novelettes)
- Small Changes (1969), ISBN 0709110006 (collection of 9 short stories)
- Space Lash (1969), (reprint in paperback of Small Changes)
- First Flights to the Moon (1970), ASIN B000BCHC4Y (anthology of short stories from others, edited by Hal Clement)
- Star Light (1971), ISBN 0-345-02361-7 (part of the Mesklin series, sequel to Mission of Gravity. It also shares some characters with Close to Critical)
- Ocean on Top (1973), ISBN 1-4510-1057-5 (magazine publications in 1967)
- Left of Africa (1976), ISBN 0936414014 (historical novel for young adults, apparently limited to 750 copies)
- Through the Eye of a Needle (1978), ISBN 0-345-25850-9 (the second and last novel in the Needle series)
- The Best of Hal Clement (1979), ISBN 0345276892 (collection of 10 short stories, including all of Natives of Space and two from Small Changes: "Uncommon Sense" and "Dust Rag")
- The Nitrogen Fix (1980), ISBN 0-441-58116-1
- Intuit (1987), ISBN 0-915368-35-8 (complete collection of the 4 Laird Cunningham stories, edition limited to 820 copies)
- Still River (1987), ISBN 0-345-32916-3
- Fossil (1993), ISBN 0-88677-573-6 (set in Isaac Asimov's Universe)
- Half Life (1999), ISBN 0-312-86920-7 (Humanity is going extinct due to disease, scientists are sent to Titan in the faint hope of finding biochemical clues to a cure)
- The Essential Hal Clement, Volume 1: Trio for Slide Rule and Typewriter Archived September 27, 2007, at the Wayback Machine (1999), ISBN 1-886778-06-X (collection of the novels Needle, Iceworld and Close to Critical)
- The Essential Hal Clement, Volume 2: Music of Many Spheres Archived September 27, 2007, at the Wayback Machine (2000), ISBN 1-886778-07-8 (collection of 17 short stories, including most from Small Changes and from The Best of Hal Clement)
- The Essential Hal Clement, Volume 3: Variations on a Theme by Sir Isaac Newton Archived September 29, 2007, at the Wayback Machine (2000), ISBN 1-886778-08-6 (collection of all Mesklin stories except Close to Critical: Mission of Gravity, Star Light, "Lecture Demonstration" and "Under"; also the how-to-write-science-fiction article "Whirligig World")
- Heavy Planet (2002), ISBN 0-7653-0368-X (reprint of The Essential Hal Clement, Volume 3)
- Noise (2003), ISBN 0-7653-0857-6 (set on an ocean planet)
- Men of the Morning Star/Planet for Plunder (2011), ISBN 978-1-61287-018-2 (two novellas, the first by Edmond Hamilton and the second by Hal Clement and Sam Merwin Jr.)
- The Moon is Hell!/The Green World (2012), ISBN 978-1-61287-087-8 (two novellas, the first by John W. Campbell Jr. and the second by Hal Clement)
- The Time Trap/The Lunar Lichen (2013), ISBN 978-1-61287-142-4 (two novellas, the first by Henry Kuttner and the second by Hal Clement)
- Hal Clement SF Gateway Omnibus (2014), ISBN 978-0575110151 (collection of the novels Iceworld, Cycle of Fire and Close to Critical)

=== About Hal Clement ===
- Starmont Readers Guide 11: Hal Clement (1982), ISBN 978-0893700423. Donald M. Hassler.
- Hal Clement, Scientist with a Mission: a Working Bibliography (1989), ASIN B0006OUUAU. Gordon Benson Jr.
- Hal's Worlds: Stories and Essays in Memory of Hal Clement (2005), ISBN 978-0-8095-5073-9. Several authors.

== Articles and introductions ==
- Probability Zero! (nov 1942). Published jointly with Malcolm Jameson, Harry Warner Jr., Dennis Tucker and P. Schuyler Miller in Astounding. About Probability Zero, Harry Harrison said in the John Campbell Memorial Anthology: "In the early 1940s, in Astounding, there was a small department called Probability Zero! that ran short-short stories. Or items. Or lies. Things. These things were usually funny and always impossible - echoing the description of the title."
- Whirligig World (jun 1953). About how to write science fiction, and specifically, about how he wrote Mission of Gravity. Published in Astounding. Collected in The Essential Hal Clement Volume 3, Heavy Planet and Mission of Gravity (1978).
- Some Notes on Xi Bootis. Published by Advent Publishers.
- Gravity insufficient (nov 1961). Published in Analog Science Fact.
- Chips on Distant Shoulders (1980). Published in The Future at War Vol. 3.
- Basic Concepts: Astrophysics, Geology (1985). About Harlan Ellison's world Medea. Published in Medea: Harlan's World.
- Second Thoughts (1985). About Harlan Ellison's world Medea, jointly written with Poul Anderson, Thomas M. Disch, Larry Niven & Frederik Pohl. Published in Medea: Harlan's World.
- The Home System (oct 1986). Published in Aboriginal.
- Intuition: The Guide Who Needs Steering (1987). Published in Intuit.
- The Magic Picture (1989). Published in L. Ron Hubbard Presents Writers of the Future v5.
- Whatever Happened to the Science in Science Fiction? (sep 1993). Published in Science Fiction Age.
- Ardent Thuria, Chilly Cluros: Seeing, and Seeing From, Low Orbiting Satellites (1994). Published in Mindsparks.
- Only Once (1994). Published in Fractal.
- Will (1998). Introduction to First Contacts: The Essential Murray Leinster.
- Jack Williamson, especulator (1999). Introduction to The Collected Stories of Jack Williamson, Volume One: The Metal Man and Others.
- Alfred E. van Vogt (2003). Introduction to Transfinite: The Essential A.E. van Vogt.
- About Proof, of Course (2003). Introduction to Proof in Wondrous Beginnings.

== See also ==
- Golden Age of Science Fiction
