= Raymond Z. Gallun =

American science-fiction writer

- Gallun c. 1953
- Born: Raymond Zinke Gallun; March 22, 1911; Beaver Dam, Wisconsin
- Died: April 2, 1994 (aged 83); Queens, New York
- Occupation: Author
- Writing career
- Pen name: Dow Elstar, E.V. Raymond, William Callahan, Arthur Allport
- Genre: Science fiction

Raymond Zinke Gallun (March 22, 1911 – April 2, 1994) was an American science fiction writer.

== Early life ==
Gallun (rhymes with "balloon") was born in Beaver Dam, Wisconsin, the son of Adolph and Martha Zinke Gallun. He graduated from high school in 1928. He left college after one year and travelled in Europe, living a drifter's existence, working a multitude of jobs around the world in the years leading up to World War II.

== Career ==
Gallun wrote his first two stories, "The Space Dwellers" and "The Crystal Ray" (both published in 1929), at age 16. He was among the stalwart group of early sci-fi pulp writers who popularized the genre. He sold many popular stories to pulp magazines in the 1930s. "Old Faithful" (1934) was his first noted story. "The Gentle Brain" was published in "Science Fiction Quarterly" under the pseudonym Arthur Allport.

His first book, People Minus X, was published in 1957 by Simon & Schuster, followed by The Planet Strappers in 1961 (Pyramid). The Ballantine collection issued in 1978, The Best of Raymond Z. Gallun, provides a selection of his early work. Gallun was honored with the I-CON Lifetime Achievement Award in 1985 at I-CON IV; the award was later renamed The Raymond Z. Gallun Award.

His pen names include Dow Elstar, E.V. Raymond, William Callahan, and Arthur Allport.

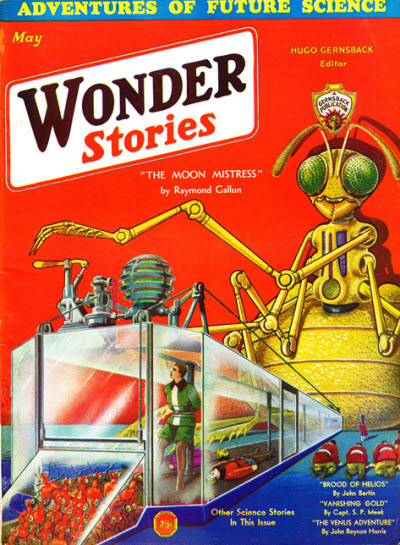
Gallun's novelette "The Moon Mistress" was the cover story for the May 1932 Wonder Stories

== Death and posthumous work ==
Gallun died of a heart attack at his home in the Forest Hills neighborhood of Queens, New York, on April 2, 1994.

A posthumous autobiography, Starclimber, authored in part by Gallun and completed by Jeffrey M. Elliot, was published in September 2007. There is an extensive interview with Gallun about his life and career in Eric Leif Davin's Pioneers of Wonder.

In 2017, a mural honoring Gallun was painted in his hometown of Beaver Dam by an organization of sign and mural artists known as "Walldogs."

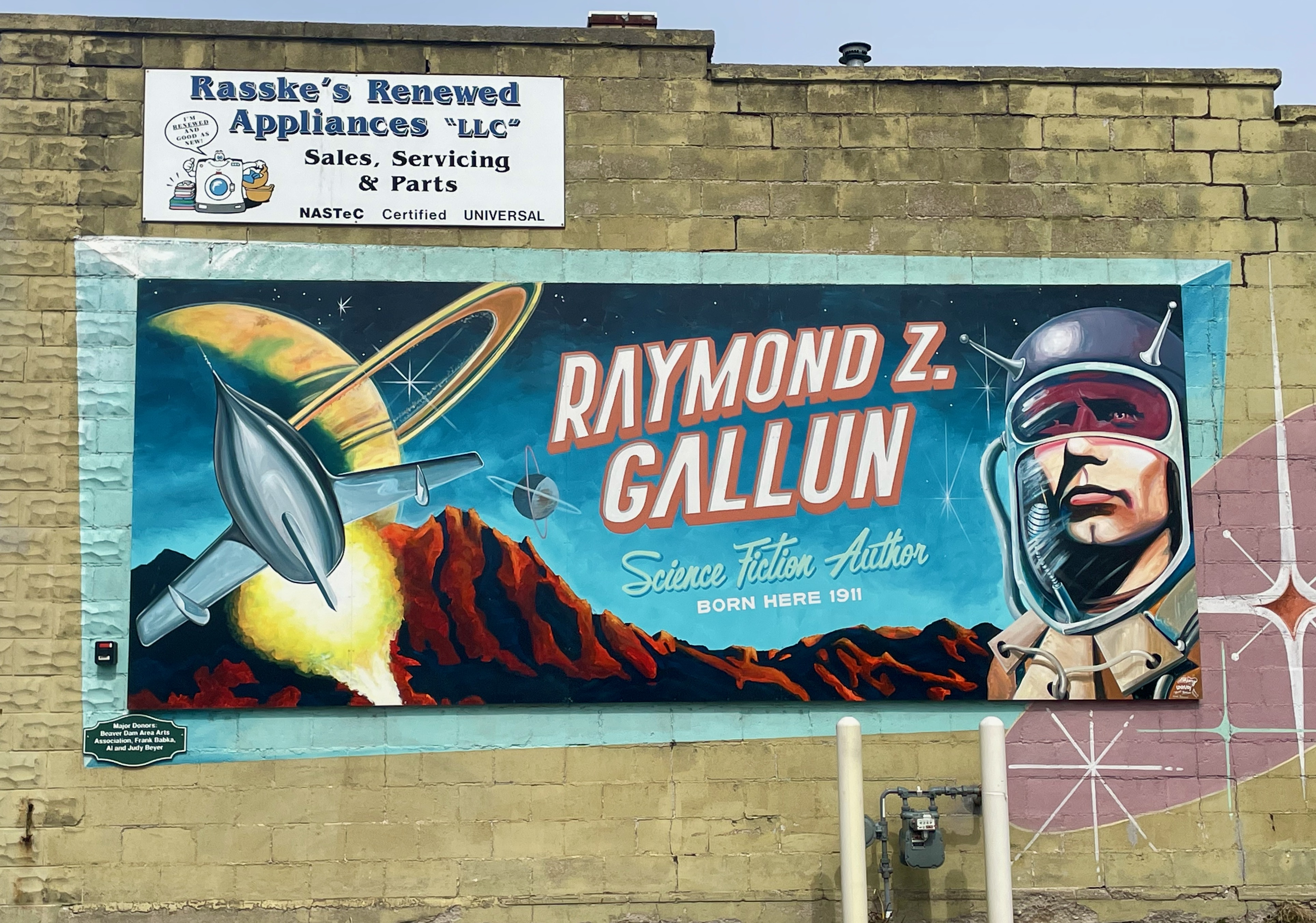
Mural honoring Gallun in his hometown of Beaver Dam.

== Bibliography ==
=== Novels ===
- Passport to Jupiter (1951)
- People Minus X (1957)
- The Planet Strappers (1961)
- The Eden Cycle (1974)
- Skyclimber (1981)
- Bioblast (1985)

=== Short fiction ===
- "The Space Dwellers" (1929)
- "The Crystal Ray" (1929)
- "The Revolt of the Starmen" (1932)
- "Old Faithful" (1934)
- "Avalanche" (1935, as by Dow Elstar)
- "The Son of Old Faithful" (1935)
- "Child of the Stars" (1936)
- "Seeds of the Dusk" (1938)
- "The Machine That Thought" (1939, as by William Callahan)
- "A Step Farther Out" (1950)
- "Big Pill" (1952)
- "Apollo at Go" (1963)
- The Best of Raymond Z. Gallun (collection, 1978)

=== Nonfiction ===
- "Editorial" (Ahoy!, March 1984)
- "Editorial" (Ahoy!, August 1984)
- Starclimber (1991)
