= The Dude (magazine) =

American men's magazines

- May, 1959 issue of The Dude (volume 3, Number 5)
- Editor: Bruce Elliott
- Categories: Men's magazines
- Frequency: Bi-monthly
- Publisher: Mystery Publishing Co., Inc.
- Founded: 1956
- Final issue: 1976
- Country: USA
- Based in: New York, New York
- Language: English

The Dude: The Magazine Devoted to Pleasure was a men's magazine of the 1950s that was published bi-monthly by the Mystery Publishing Co., Inc. at 48 West 48th Street, New York, New York. The magazine was published from August 1956 to 1976.

The magazine contained articles on style, music, society, politics, women, and contained seminude pictures of women. In March 1957 The Dude published work by William Faulkner.

The Dude cost 50 cents.

In Vol 6, No 4 of March 1962 featured a "New Fiction" by Nelson Algren an American author who lived in Chicago in the 1950s. The article was titled "God Bless the Lonesome Gas Man...For He Protects Us All", categorized as humor. The article is about the infamous People's Gas company and the industrialization of Chicago. It alludes to a bar, which Algren calls "The Poor Loser's Corner", in reality, it is a Ukrainian Village local dive bar, Rainbo Club. This historical Chicago bar is located on the corner of Division and Damen, where the fictional character is last seen standing under the eerie traffic lights.

Vol. 5, No. 2, November 1960 contains a piece by William Lindsay Gresham, an American novelist.

Vol.7, No. 5, May 1963 contains an article and photos of Marilyn Monroe.

Vol, 2, No. 3, January 1958 includes fiction by Robert Penn Warren titled a "Christmas Gift" and James T. Farrell.
