= Fossil (novel) =

1993 novel by Hal Clement

First edition (publ. DAW Books) Cover art by Romas Kukalis

Fossil is a science fiction book by American writer Hal Clement, as part of the Isaac's Universe series. It was first printed in November 1993. Copyright was reserved to him under his real name, Harry C. Stubbs, and the company he associated himself with, Tomorrow, Inc.

== Plot summary ==
On a medium-sized, low-gravity planet with a very slow rotational period, the side that is furthest from the sun is always a very hard mixture of frozen carbon dioxide, rock hard ammonia, and solid water ice, and the side that is closest, a sea of turbulent liquids and icebergs. The planet rotates so slowly that the part which is half ice and half ocean is constantly beset with troubling weather conditions, ranging from blizzards to unanticipated ice melts and earthquakes. It takes centuries if not thousands of years for the wobbling of the planet on the ecliptic to melt certain parts of the planet. It is also possible for the planet to have become locked in orbit, so the furthest side never melts. The tidal locking of the planet may have occurred hundreds of millions of years ago, and seasons appear to be limited to the slight wobbling of the planet on the ecliptic. Far from being an uninteresting planet, the ecliptic along which the planet travels is also tilted. Most of the colonies are located along the "coast" - the place in a murky half-shadow of constant night and constant day.

Scientific researchers of various kinds of alien species from all over the known universe have come to this planet to engage in an arduous archaeological expedition to unearth mysterious fossils from deep within the multi-kilometer thick icy crust. They have dug so deep that it is generally considered dangerous to dig any deeper. On some of the worlds throughout the galaxy, mysterious relics are found from an earlier civilization that no longer exists. Since the planet has almost no rock at its core, and enjoyed a rotational period for the first couple billion years of its existence, there is probably nothing to find, apart from fossils of earlier species once flourishing on the planet, but now extinct.

== See also ==
- List of science fiction novels
- Isaac Asimov
- Isaac's Universe
