= Angels and Spaceships =

1954 collection of science fiction and fantasy stories by Fredric Brown

- First edition
- Author: Fredric Brown
- Cover artist: "Kohs"
- Language: English
- Genre: Science fiction, fantasy
- Publisher: E. P. Dutton
- Publication date: 1954
- Media type: Print (hardcover)
- Pages: 224

Angels and Spaceships is a 1954 collection of science fiction and fantasy stories by American writer Fredric Brown. It was initially published in hardcover by E. P. Dutton; a later Bantam paperback edition was retitled Star Shine.

== Contents ==
- "Introduction" (original essay by author)
- "Pattern" (original)
- "Placet is a Crazy Place" (Astounding 1946)
- "Answer" (original)
- "Etaoin Shrdlu" (Unknown 1942)
- "Preposterous" (original)
- "Armageddon" (Unknown 1941)
- "Politeness" (original)
- "The Waveries" (Astounding 1945)
- "Reconciliation" (original)
- "The Hat Trick" (Unknown 1943)
- "Search" (original)
- "Letter to a Phoenix" (Astounding 1949)
- "Daisies" (original)
- "The Angelic Angleworm" (Unknown 1943)
- "Sentence" (original)
- "The Yehudi Principle" (Astounding 1944)
- "Solipsist" (original)

The original stories are generally very short vignettes.

== Reception ==
Anthony Boucher found the collection "contains a little of everything, from screwball fantasy to sober science fiction" and praised Brown's "sparkling originality and delightfully crisp writing." P. Schuyler Miller found the stories to be "good fun", though not so impressive as Brown's novel-length work. Groff Conklin called the book "perfectly delightful", with eight of Brown's "very best stories".
