= The Waveries =

- Short story by Fredric Brown
- Country: United States
- Language: English
- Genre: Science fiction

Publication
- Published in: Astounding
- Publication type: Periodical
- Media type: Print (newspaper, magazine, hardback & paperback)
- Publication date: January 1945

"The Waveries" is a science fiction short story by the American writer Fredric Brown, published in the January 1945 issue of Astounding Science Fiction and included in Brown's 1954 collection Angels and Spaceships.

== Plot ==
A few years in the future (1947 in the magazine version of the story, updated to 1957 in the book version) an incredibly powerful Morse code signal begins disrupting radio broadcasts. The signal is quickly identified as an "echo" of a landmark 1901 wireless test by Marconi, and is shortly followed by similar snippets of other early transmissions. All are extremely powerful, blanket the entire frequency spectrum, and repeat themselves in loops ranging from one-half to thirty seconds in length. After a period of initial confusion, the transmissions are triangulated and found to originate from space, in the direction of the constellation Leo. However, after a few days, the signals become non-directional; a prominent scientist is interviewed and explains that this can only mean that the mysterious radio sources have arrived on Earth.

A consensus slowly emerges among the scientific community that the transmissions are actually an exotic form of life, in the form of self-replicating electromagnetic wavelengths: each snippet of broadcast represents a discrete entity - a "wavery" or "invader," colloquially shortened to "vader." Experts can only speculate whether these entities are sentient, and caution that - even if they were - humans will probably never be able to communicate with them, as they are as different in kind from humans as humans are from insects. They do however predict that - as the vaders appear to metabolize electromagnetic radiation - radio will never be available again. Society begins to adjust to its absence, but after only a few additional weeks people notice that thunderstorms are no longer accompanied by lightning; shortly thereafter, all electrical devices start faltering. It becomes apparent that the vaders consume not only electromagnetic emissions, but all forms of electricity. As internal-combustion engines stop functioning, the government declares a state of emergency and launches a crash program to manufacture steam engines and breed draft animals.

The story skips forward a few years: there have been no major societal disruptions, but the U.S. has reverted to a late-Victorian technological level, with the return of steamships, horses, and buggies. There are no longer any means of rapid communication or mass entertainment. Brown portrays this development in nostalgic and idyllic terms: large cities are gradually emptying out, and the civic lives of small towns are reinvigorated by small newspapers, amateur theatricals, community orchestras, and a general slowing of the pace of life.

== Reception ==
The story was a favorite of Philip K. Dick, who described it as "[maybe] the most significant—startlingly so—story sci-fi has yet produced".
