= Letter to a Phoenix =

1949 short story by Fredric Brown

"Letter to a Phoenix" is a science fiction short story by American writer Fredric Brown, first published in the August 1949 issue of Astounding Science Fiction. It takes the form of an open letter to humanity from a 180,000-year-old man, attempting to convey a fundamental fact about humanity he has learned in the course of observing the rise and fall of multiple civilizations.

== Plot summary ==
The unnamed narrator gives a brief summary of his life. He explains he was born with a pituitary dysfunction, a few years before the invention of nuclear weapons. At the age of 23, a major nuclear war breaks out, and the narrator is in the course of his military service irradiated by a near-miss. Awakening in a hospital, he discovers that his pituitary condition has been cured, and that he is furthermore now aging at a drastically decelerated rate, approximately 15,000 times slower than normal; in the following 1800 centuries, he physically ages only eleven years. A side effect of his new state is that he no longer sleeps, as his circadian cycles has been similarly distorted; he now alternates between a 30-year period of wakefulness and a 15-year period of sleep, during which he must find a hiding place. The narrator relates how he has adapted to his immortality: he has found spouses - with whom he only stays for 30 years at a time, so as not to elicit suspicion - and has never pursued wealth or leadership positions, so as not to draw attention to himself. Aside from his immortality, he is vulnerable to the same physical dangers as any human.

The narrator makes fragmentary references to civilizational benchmarks he has witnessed, including interplanetary, interstellar, and even intergalactic travel, the planting of colonies on many worlds, and above all wars. He makes a distinction between "minor" nuclear wars, which result in "mere" Dark Ages - a few centuries during which technologies are not forgotten, but the industrial base for them is lost - and "blowups," which follow the invention of much more destructive weapons, represent a complete loss of continuity, and require the rebuilding of civilization from scratch. He notes that he has experienced six blowups.

The fundamental lesson that the narrator wishes to convey is that humanity is unique in a very specific way: humans have encountered several alien species, and have discovered a means of conducting a census of sentient species by remote detection of thought emanations. He informs the reader that the average lifetime of an intelligent species is approximately 50,000 years, inevitably followed by senescence, decline, and extinction. Humanity, however, is unique in not being subject to this pattern, because of its penchant for self-destruction and loss of continuity. In this sense, it is like a phoenix, which is continually reborn in an act of self-immolation, living forever. In something of a twist, the narrator names the six civilizations he has seen which have ended in blow-ups; the last of these are Mu and Atlantis, thereby overturning an unspoken implication that he is speaking from 180,000 years in the future. Finally, the narrator speculates that - given the effacing powers of erosion and the loss of cultural continuity - the civilization into which he was born may not have been the first one, and that humanity may have been passing through these cycles since long before his birth.

== Reception ==
Literary scholar Jack Seabrook has described it as "(t)hought-provoking rather than exciting" and "perhaps (the) best" of Brown's stories focusing on "social or political commentary".

Vernor Vinge said that he was "fascinated" by the story, and that it was the direct inspiration for the 1975 story "The Peddler's Apprentice" which he co-wrote with his then-wife, Joan D. Vinge.

James Nicoll, writing in 2018, felt that the story "has not aged well."
