= Nightmares and Geezenstacks =

1961 short story collection by Fredric Brown

- Author: Fredric Brown
- Cover artist: Hieronymus Bosch
- Language: English
- Genre: Horror
- Publisher: Bantam Books
- Publication date: July 1961
- Publication place: United States
- Media type: Print (paperback)
- Pages: 137

Nightmares and Geezenstacks is a short story collection consisting of 47 horror, science fiction and crime stories by American writer Fredric Brown. It was first published in 1961 by Bantam Books and most recently republished by Valancourt Books.

== Contents ==
- Nasty
- Abominable
- Rebound [“The Power”]
- Nightmare in Gray
- Nightmare in Green
- Nightmare in White
- Nightmare in Blue
- Nightmare in Yellow
- Nightmare in Red
- Unfortunately
- Granny’s Birthday
- Cat Burglar
- The House
- Second Chance
- Great Lost Discoveries I - Invisibility
- Great Lost Discoveries II - Invulnerability
- Great Lost Discoveries III - Immortality
- Dead Letter [“The Letter”]
- Recessional
- Hobbyist
- The Ring of Hans Carvel
- Vengeance Fleet [“Vengeance, Unlimited”]
- Rope Trick
- Fatal Error [“The Perfect Crime”]
- The Short Happy Lives of Eustace Weaver I
- The Short Happy Lives of Eustace Weaver II
- The Short Happy Lives of Eustace Weaver III
- Expedition
- Bright Beard
- Jaycee
- Contact [“Earthmen Bearing Gifts”]
- Horse Race
- Death on the Mountain
- Bear Possibility
- Not Yet the End
- Fish Story
- Three Little Owls (A Fable)
- Runaround [“Starvation”]
- Murder in Ten Easy Lessons [“Ten Tickets to Hades”]
- Dark Interlude · Fredric Brown & Mack Reynolds
- Entity Trap [“From These Ashes”]
- The Little Lamb
- Me and Flapjack and the Martians
- The Joke [“If Looks Could Kill”]
- Cartoonist [“Garrigan’s Bems”]
- The Geezenstacks
- The End [“Nightmare in Time”]

== Adaptations ==
In 1986, Nancy Doyne adapted The Geezenstacks into a teleplay for the series Tales from the Darkside.
