= Martians, Go Home =

1954 novel by Fredric Brown

- Dust-jacket from the first edition
- Author: Fredric Brown
- Language: English
- Genre: Science fiction
- Publisher: E. P. Dutton
- Publication date: 1955
- Publication place: United States
- Media type: Print (hardcover)
- Pages: 189
- OCLC: 5722014

Martians, Go Home is a science fiction comic novel by American writer Fredric Brown, published in the magazine Astounding Science Fiction in September 1954 and later by E. P. Dutton in 1955. The novel concerns a writer who witnesses an alien invasion of Earth by boorish little green men from Mars.

== Synopsis ==
The story begins on 26 March 1964. Luke Deveraux, the protagonist, is a 37-year-old sci-fi writer who is being divorced by his wife. Deveraux holes himself up in a desert cabin with the intention of writing a new novel (and forgetting the painful failure of his marriage). Drunk, he considers writing a story about Martians, when, all of a sudden, someone knocks on the door. Deveraux opens it to find a little green man, a Martian. The Martian turns out to be very discourteous; he insists on calling Luke 'Mack,' and has little in mind other than the desire to insult and humiliate Luke. The Martian, who is intangible, proves to be able to disappear at will and to see through opaque materials. Luke leaves his cabin by car, thinking to himself that the alien was but a drunken hallucination. He realises that he is wrong when he discovers that a billion Martians have come to Earth.

== Martians ==
Fredric Brown reprises the popular image of Martians as little green men, who are around 75 cm tall and have small torsos, long frayed limbs, and spherical bald heads. They have six fingers on each hand and wear boots and trousers. They consider the human race inferior and are both interested and amused by human behaviour. Unlike most other fictional Martian invaders, the Martians that Brown writes of do not intend to invade Earth by violence but instead spend their wakeful hours calling everyone 'Mack' or 'Toots' (or some regional variation thereof), reveal embarrassing secrets, heckling theatre productions, lampoon political speeches, and even provide cynical colour commentary to honeymooners' frustrated attempts at consummating their marriage. The nonstop acerbic criticism stops most human activity and renders many people insane, including Luke, whose stress-induced inability to see the little green maligners divides opinion on whether he should be considered mad or blessed.

== Reception ==
Galaxy reviewer Floyd C. Gale praised the novel, saying that although Brown was occasionally "carried away," he nevertheless "succeeded in writing a very funny book." In 1977, Richard A. Lupoff described it as "one of the most charming bits of SF-whimsy ever written [and] marvelous reading."

== Accolades ==
The novel is considered a classic of science fiction by the following works of reference:

- Annick Beguin, Les 100 principaux titres de la science-fiction, Cosmos 2000, 1981;
- Science-fiction. La bibliothèque idéale, Albin Michel, 1988;
- Reader poll of the Carnage mondain fanzine, 1989;
- Lorris Murail, Les Maîtres de la science-fiction, Bordas, col. ‘Compacts’, 1993;
- Stan Barets, Le science-fictionnaire, Denoël, col. ‘Présence du futur’, 1994.

== Film adaptation ==
In 1989, director David Odell adapted the novel into a movie of the same name with Randy Quaid playing the title character renamed to Mark Deveraux.

== Sources ==
- Tuck, Donald H. (1974). The Encyclopedia of Science Fiction and Fantasy. Chicago: Advent. p. 68. ISBN 0-911682-20-1.
