= H. R. Van Dongen =

American artist

Henry Richard Van Dongen (August 20, 1920 - February 27, 2010), often professionally known as H.R. Van Dongen, was an American artist best known for his science fiction magazine and book covers.

== Career ==
Born August 20, 1920, in Rochester, New York, to son of Henry van Dongen Sr., he had an older brother, Charles. He graduated from Irondequoit High School, and then attended the local Mechanics Institute (now Rochester Institute of Technology). He also studied art at the Phoenix School of Design in New York City. He found employment as graphic artist at Hart-Conway, a local advertising agency.

Van Dongen enlisted in the U.S. Army Air Corps in September 1942. He served as a B-24 gunner with the Eighth Air Force during World War II and spent 11 months as a prisoner of war after being shot down.

His first science fiction magazine cover was for the September 1950 issue of Super Science Stories. His work impressed John W. Campbell, editor of Analog Science Fiction and Fact, and he soon became one of the magazine's premiere artists. His first cover was for the August 1951 issue. He often alternated with Kelly Freas as the cover artist for Analog. Van Dongen did more than 40 covers for the magazine.

Van Dongen stopped working in science fiction in the early 1960s. In 1976, Lester del Rey convinced him to return to the genre to paint covers for Ballantine Books. He stayed with Ballantine until his professional retirement in 1987.

== Personal life and death ==
Van Dongen married Eleanor Bertha Leister on November 22, 1945. He preferred landscape painting in his spare time.

H.R. Van Dongen died on February 27, 2010, in Canandaigua, New York.
