= Philip K. Dick bibliography =

List of works by American science fiction, Philip K Dick

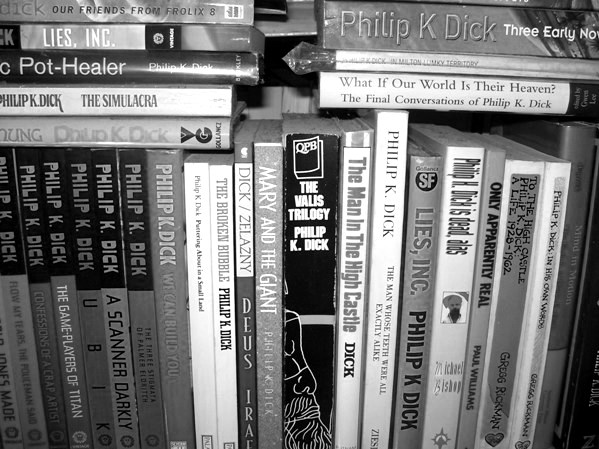
Some books by and about Philip K. Dick

The bibliography of Philip K. Dick includes 45 novels, 121 short stories, and 14 short story collections published by American science fiction author Philip K. Dick (December 16, 1928 – March 2, 1982) during his lifetime.

At the time of his death, Dick's work was generally known to only science fiction readers, and many of his novels and short stories were out of print. To date, a total of 45 novels have been published and translations have appeared in 25 languages. Six volumes of selected correspondence, written by Dick from 1938 through 1982, were published between 1991 and 2009.

The Library of America has issued three collections of Dick's novels. The first, published in June 2007, contained The Man in the High Castle, The Three Stigmata of Palmer Eldritch, Do Androids Dream of Electric Sheep? and Ubik, and was the first time science fiction was included in the LOA canon. The second collection was issued in July 2008, and included Martian Time Slip, Dr. Bloodmoney, Now Wait for Last Year, Flow My Tears, the Policeman Said, and A Scanner Darkly. The third collection was published in July 2009 and included A Maze of Death and the VALIS trilogy (VALIS, The Divine Invasion, and The Transmigration of Timothy Archer).

At least nine films have been adapted from Dick's work, the first being Blade Runner in 1982.

== Recurring themes in Dick's work ==
Five recurring philosophical themes in Dick's work have been classified by Philip K. Dick scholar Erik Davis:

- False realities
- Human vs. machine
- Entropy
- The nature of God
- Social control

Similarly, in Understanding Philip K. Dick, Eric Carl Link discussed eight themes or 'ideas and motifs':

- Epistemology and the Nature of Reality
- Know Thyself
- The Android and the Human
- Entropy and Pot Healing
- The Theodicy Problem
- Warfare and Power Politics
- The Evolved Human
- 'Technology, Media, Drugs and Madness'

== Published works ==
Dates in this bibliography are for completion of first (and usually only) draft. Publication dates follow separately.

- (+) indicates subsequent significant expansion
- (*) indicates subsequent revision or minor expansion
- (LOA#) indicates the volume of the Library of America omnibus (see below)

=== Novels by year of composition ===
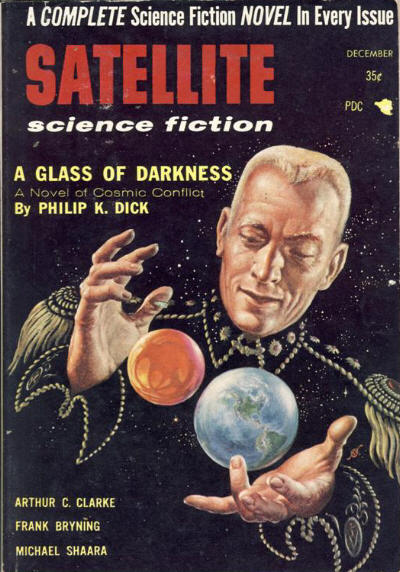
Dick's novel The Cosmic Puppets originally appeared in the December 1956 issue of Satellite Science Fiction as "A Glass of Darkness."

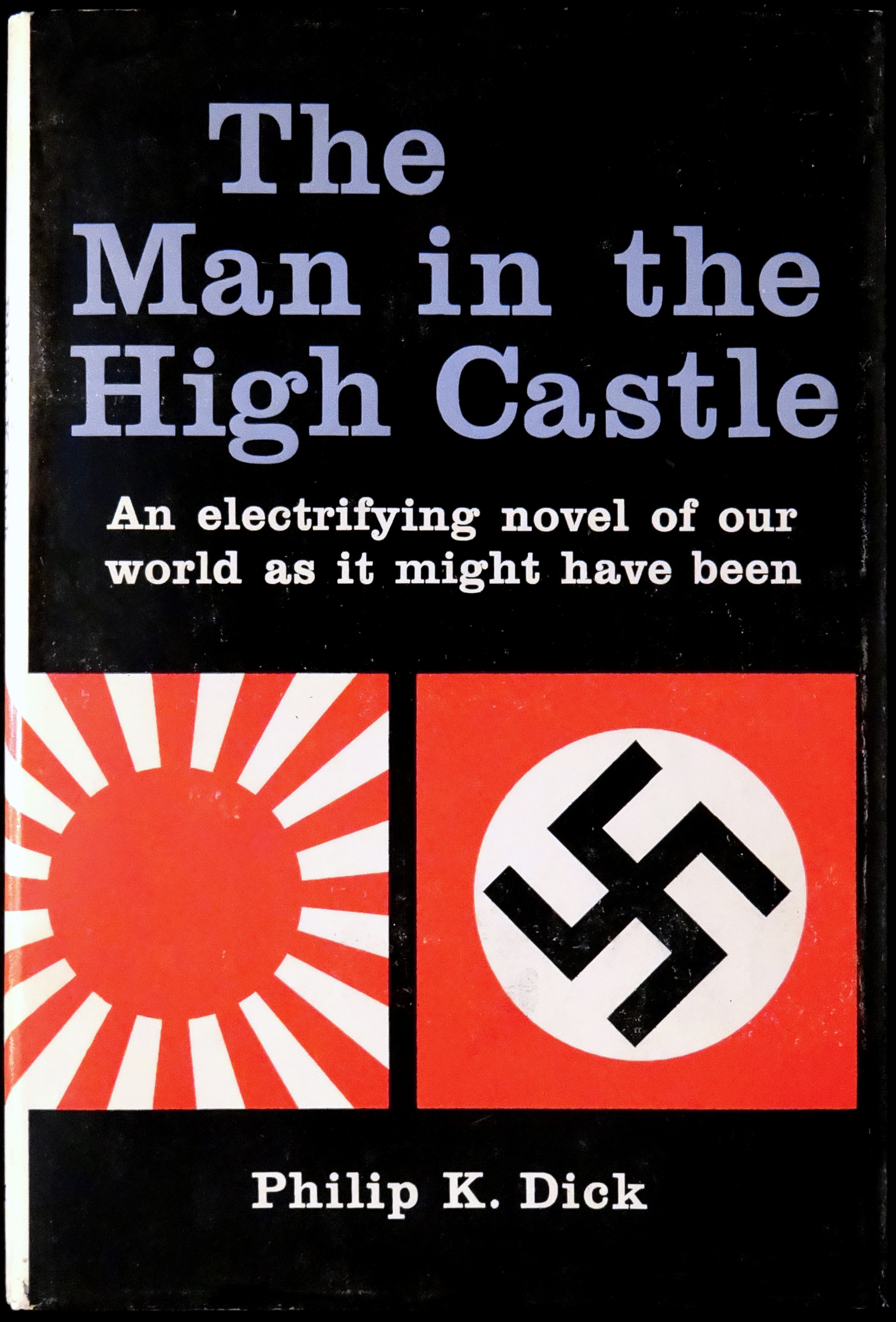
Cover for The Man in the High Castle

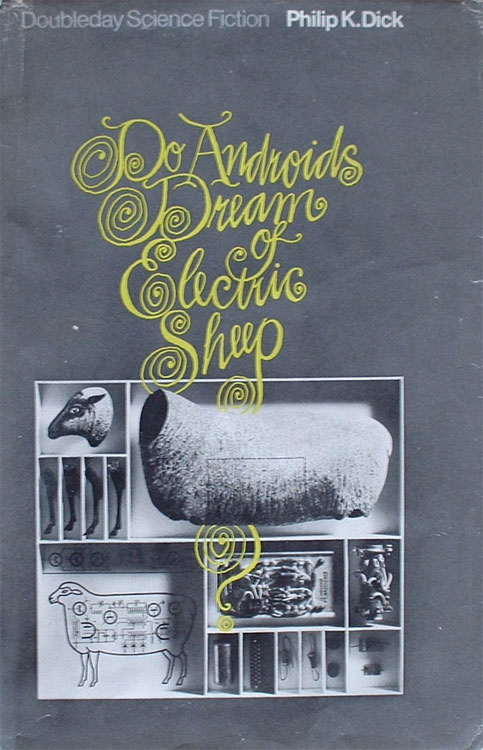
Cover for Do Androids Dream of Electric Sheep?

Year	Title	Published	Notes
1950	Gather Yourselves Together	1994	
1952	Voices from the Street	2007	
1953	Vulcan's Hammer	1960	+
1953	Dr. Futurity	1960	+
1953	The Cosmic Puppets	1957	*
1954	Solar Lottery	1955	*
1954	Mary and the Giant	1987	*
1954	The World Jones Made	1956	
1955	Eye in the Sky	1957	
1955	The Man Who Japed	1956	
1956	A Time for George Stavros		Manuscript lost
1956	Pilgrim on the Hill		Manuscript lost
1956	The Broken Bubble	1988	
1957	Puttering About in a Small Land	1985	
1958	Nicholas and the Higs		Manuscript lost.
1958	Time Out of Joint	1959	
1958	In Milton Lumky Territory	1985	
1959	Confessions of a Crap Artist	1975	
1960	The Man Whose Teeth Were All Exactly Alike	1984	
1960	Humpty Dumpty in Oakland	1986	
1961	The Man in the High Castle	1962	Hugo Award winner, 1963; LOA1
1962	We Can Build You	1972	First published as A. Lincoln, Simulacrum as a serial in Amazing Stories issues for November 1969 and January 1970.
1962	Martian Time-Slip	1964	LOA2; first published as All We Marsmen as a serial in Worlds of Tomorrow issues for August, October and December 1963.
1963	Dr. Bloodmoney, or How We Got Along After the Bomb	1965	Nebula Award nominee, 1965; LOA2
1963	The Game-Players of Titan	1963	
1963	The Simulacra	1964	
1963	The Crack in Space	1966	as Cantata-140 (1966)
1963	Now Wait for Last Year	1966	LOA2
1964	Clans of the Alphane Moon	1964	
1964	The Three Stigmata of Palmer Eldritch	1965	Nebula Award nominee, 1965; LOA1
1964	The Zap Gun	1967	First published as Project Plowshare as a serial in Worlds of Tomorrow issues for November 1965 and January 1966.
1964	The Penultimate Truth	1964	
1964	Deus Irae	1976	with Roger Zelazny *+
1964	The Unteleported Man	1966	as Lies, Inc. (1984) *+
1965	The Ganymede Takeover	1967	with Ray Nelson *
1965	Counter-Clock World	1967	+
1966	Do Androids Dream of Electric Sheep?	1968	Nebula Award nominee, 1968; LOA1
1966	Nick and the Glimmung	1988	For children
1966	Ubik	1969	LOA1
1968	Galactic Pot-Healer	1969	
1968	A Maze of Death	1970	LOA3
1969	Our Friends from Frolix 8	1970	
1970	Flow My Tears, the Policeman Said	1974	Nebula Award nominee, 1974; John W. Campbell Award winner, 1975; Hugo Award nominee, 1975; Locus Award nominee, 1975; LOA2 *
1973	A Scanner Darkly	1977	British Science Fiction Award winner, 1978; John W. Campbell Award nominee, 1978; LOA2 *
1976	Radio Free Albemuth	1985	
1978	VALIS	1981	LOA3
1980	The Divine Invasion	1981	British Science Fiction Award nominee, 1982; LOA3
1981	The Transmigration of Timothy Archer	1982	Nebula Award nominee, 1982; Locus Award nominee, 1983; LOA3
1982	The Owl in Daylight		Unfinished

==== Library of America ====
The Library of America has republished 13 of Dick's 45 novels:

2007
Four Novels of the 1960s: The Man in the High Castle/The Three Stigmata of Palmer Eldritch/Do Androids Dream of Electric Sheep?/Ubik ISBN 978-1-59853-009-4

2008
Philip K. Dick: Five Novels of the 1960s and 70s: Martian Time Slip / Dr. Bloodmoney / Now Wait for Last Year / Flow My Tears the Policeman Said / A Scanner Darkly ISBN 978-1-59853-025-4

2009
Philip K. Dick: VALIS and Later Novels: A Maze of Death/VALIS/The Divine Invasion/The Transmigration of Timothy Archer ISBN 978-1-59853-044-5

=== Short story collections ===
1955
A Handful of Darkness

1957
The Variable Man And Other Stories

1969
The Preserving Machine

1973
The Book of Philip K. Dick (reissued in 1977 as The Turning Wheel and Other Stories)

1977
The Best of Philip K. Dick

1980
The Golden Man

1984
Robots, Androids, and Mechanical Oddities

1985
I Hope I Shall Arrive Soon

1987
The Collected Stories of Philip K. Dick

1988
Beyond Lies the Wub

1989
Second Variety
The Father-Thing

1990
The Days of Perky Pat
The Little Black Box
The Short Happy Life of the Brown Oxford
We Can Remember It for You Wholesale

1991
The Minority Report
Second Variety

1992
The Eye of the Sibyl

1997
The Philip K. Dick Reader

2002
Minority Report
Selected Stories of Philip K. Dick

2004
Paycheck

2006
Vintage PKD

2009
The Early Work of Philip K. Dick, Volume One: The Variable Man & Other Stories. Prime Books. ISBN 978-1-60701-202-3
The Early Work of Philip K. Dick, Volume Two: Breakfast at Twilight & Other Stories. Prime Books. November 2009. ISBN 1-60701-203-0.

2013
The Best of Philip K. Dick. Introduction by David Gill, Philip K. Dick scholar Echo Point Books & Media. ISBN 978-0615561189

==== Comparison of editions ====
The five volumes of The Collected Stories of Philip K. Dick were re-published and sold separately by Gollancz and later by Citadel Twilight and by Subterranean Press. For the Citadel Twilight editions the volumes were renamed and two stories were moved from one volume to another. The following table provides a comparison of the corresponding volumes from the various editions.

published by Underwood-Miller	published by Gollancz	published by Citadel Twilight	published by Subterranean Press
The Collected Stories of Philip K. Dick Volume 1 (1987)	Beyond Lies the Wub (1988)	The Short Happy Life of the Brown Oxford (1990)	The King of the Elves (2010) "Menace React" added
The Collected Stories of Philip K. Dick Volume 2 (1987)	Second Variety (1989)	We Can Remember It for You Wholesale (1990) "Second Variety" removed "We Can Remember It for You Wholesale" added	Adjustment Team (2011) Contents reverted to original contents of Second Variety (1989)
The Collected Stories of Philip K. Dick Volume 3 (1987)	The Father-Thing (1989)	Second Variety (1991) "Second Variety" added	Upon the Dull Earth (2012) Contents reverted to original contents of The Father-Thing (1989)
The Collected Stories of Philip K. Dick Volume 4 (1987)	The Days of Perky Pat (1990)	The Minority Report (1991)	The Minority Report (2013)
The Collected Stories of Philip K. Dick Volume 5 (1987)	The Little Black Box (1990)	The Eye of the Sibyl (1992) "We Can Remember It for You Wholesale" removed	We Can Remember It for You Wholesale (2014) "Goodbye Vincent" added, "We Can Remember it for You Wholesale" added back

=== Short stories ===
1952
"Beyond Lies the Wub"
"The Gun"
"The Little Movement"
"The Skull"

1953

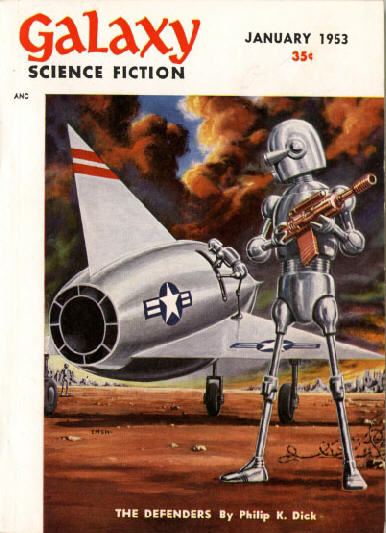
Dick's novelette "The Defenders" was the cover story for the January 1953 issue of Galaxy Science Fiction, illustrated by Ed Emshwiller

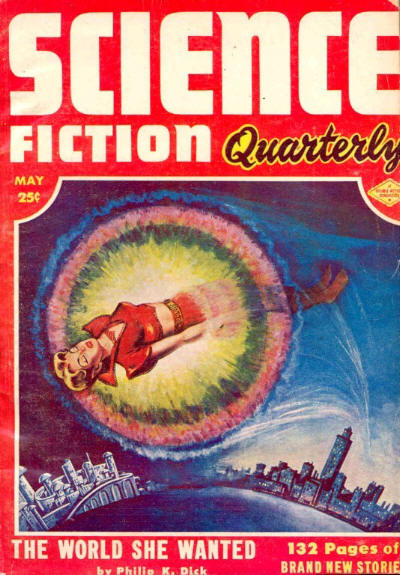
Dick's short story "The World She Wanted" took the cover of the May 1953 issue of Science Fiction Quarterly

"The Builder"
"Colony"
"The Commuter"
"The Cookie Lady"
"The Cosmic Poachers"
"The Defenders"
"Expendable"
"The Eyes Have It"
"The Great C" (adapted into the novel Deus Irae)
"The Hanging Stranger"
"The Impossible Planet"
"Impostor"
"The Indefatigable Frog"
"The Infinites"
"The King of the Elves"
"Martians Come in Clouds"
"Mr. Spaceship"
"Out in the Garden"
"Paycheck"
"Piper in the Woods"
"Planet for Transients"
"The Preserving Machine"
"Project: Earth"
"Roog"
"Second Variety"
"Some Kinds of Life"
"Tony and the Beetles"
"The Trouble with Bubbles"
"The Variable Man"
"The World She Wanted"

1954

"Adjustment Team"
"Beyond the Door"
"Breakfast at Twilight"
"The Crawlers"
"The Crystal Crypt"
"Exhibit Piece"
"The Father-thing"
"The Golden Man"
"James P. Crow"
"Jon's World"
"The Last of the Masters" (aka "Protection Agency")
"Meddler"
"Of Withered Apples"
"A Present for Pat"
"Prize Ship"
"Progeny"
"Prominent Author"
"Sales Pitch"
"Shell Game"
"The Short Happy Life of the Brown Oxford"
"Small Town"
"Souvenir"
"Strange Eden"
"Survey Team"
"Time Pawn"
"The Turning Wheel"
"Upon the Dull Earth"
"A World of Talent"

1955

"Autofac"
"Captive Market"
"The Chromium Fence"
"Foster, You're Dead!"
"The Hood Maker"
"Human Is"
"The Mold of Yancy"
"Nanny"
"Psi-man Heal My Child!"
"Service Call"
"A Surface Raid"
"War Veteran"

1956
"The Minority Report"
"Pay for the Printer"
"To Serve the Master"
"Vulcan's Hammer"

1957
"Misadjustment"
"The Unreconstructed M"

1958
"Null-O"

1959
"Explorers We"
"Fair Game"
"Recall Mechanism"
"War Game"

1963
"The Days of Perky Pat"
"If There Were No Benny Cemoli"
"Stand-by (also published as Top Stand-by Job)"
"What'll We Do with Ragland Park?"

1964

"Cantata 140"
"A Game of Unchance"
"The Little Black Box"
"Novelty Act"
"Oh, to Be a Blobel!"
"Orpheus with Clay Feet"
"Precious Artifact"
"The Unteleported Man"
"Waterspider"
"What the Dead Men Say"

1965
"Retreat Syndrome"

1966
"Holy Quarrel"
"We Can Remember It for You Wholesale"
"Your Appointment Will Be Yesterday"

1967
"Faith of Our Fathers"
"Return Match"

1968
"Not by Its Cover"
"The Story to End All Stories for Harlan Ellison’s Anthology Dangerous Visions"

1969
"The Electric Ant"
"The War with the Fnools"

1974
"The Pre-persons"
"A Little Something for Us Tempunauts"

1979
"The Exit Door Leads In"

1980
"I Hope I Shall Arrive Soon" (Originally titled "Frozen Journey".)
"Rautavaara's Case"
"Chains of Air, Web of Aether"

1981
"The Alien Mind"

1984
"Strange Memories of Death"

1987
"Cadbury, the Beaver Who Lacked"
"The Day Mr. Computer Fell Out of Its Tree"
"The Eye of the Sibyl"
"Stability"
"A Terran Odyssey"

1988
"Goodbye, Vincent"

=== Other short works ===
1987
"Fawn, Look Back" (novel outline)

1992
"The Different Stages of Love" (previously unpublished passage from Flow My Tears, the Policeman Said)

2010
"Menace React" (fragment)

=== Speeches ===
1972
"The Android and the Human" (Delivered in Vancouver, Canada)
1977
"If You Find This World Bad, You Should See Some of the Others" (Delivered in Metz, France)
1978
"How To Build A Universe That Doesn’t Fall Apart Two Days Later" (Undelivered, essay only)

=== Collected non-fiction ===
- 1988: The Dark Haired Girl
- 1995: The Shifting Realities of Philip K. Dick: Selected Literary and Philosophical Writings
- 2011: The Exegesis of Philip K. Dick, Jonathan Lethem and Pamela Jackson, eds. Houghton Mifflin Harcourt, publisher

=== Correspondence ===
- The Selected Letters of Philip K. Dick, 1938–1971. Grass Valley, California: Underwood Books, 1996 (Trade edition) ISBN 1-887424-20-2 (Slipcased edition) ISBN 1-887424-21-0
- The Selected Letters of Philip K. Dick, 1972–1973. Novato, California: Underwood-Miller, 1993 (Trade edition) ISBN 0-88733-161-0 (Slipcased edition) ISBN 0-88733-162-9
- The Selected Letters of Philip K. Dick, 1974. Novato, California: Underwood-Miller, 1991 (Trade edition) ISBN 0-88733-104-1 (Slipcased edition) ISBN 0-88733-105-X
- The Selected Letters of Philip K. Dick, 1975–1976. Novato, California: Underwood-Miller, 1992 (Trade edition) ISBN 0-88733-111-4 (Slipcased edition) ISBN 088733-112-2
- The Selected Letters of Philip K. Dick, 1977–1979. Novato, California: Underwood-Miller, 1993 (Trade edition) ISBN 0-88733-120-3 (Slipcased edition) ISBN 088733-121-1
- The Selected Letters of Philip K. Dick, 1980–1982. Nevada City, California: Underwood Books, 2009 (Trade edition) ISBN 978-1-887424-26-4 (Slipcased edition) ISBN 978-1-887424-27-1

=== Film adaptations ===
#	Film	Date	Director	Source work	Date	Type	TV Series or Sequel	Date
1	Blade Runner	1982	Ridley Scott	Do Androids Dream of Electric Sheep?	1968	Novel	Sequel: Blade Runner 2049	2017
2	Total Recall	1990	Paul Verhoeven	"We Can Remember It for You Wholesale"	1966	Short story	TV series: Total Recall 2070	1999
3	Confessions d'un Barjo	1992	Jérôme Boivin	Confessions of a Crap Artist	1975	Novel	–	–
4	Screamers	1995	Christian Duguay	"Second Variety"	1953	Short story	Sequel: Screamers: The Hunting	2009
5	Minority Report	2002	Steven Spielberg	"The Minority Report"	1956	Short story	TV series: Minority Report	2015
6	Impostor	2001	Gary Fleder	"Impostor"	1953	Short story	Episode of TV series: Out of This World, adapted by Terry Nation	1962
7	Paycheck	2003	John Woo	"Paycheck"	1953	Short story	–	–
8	A Scanner Darkly	2006	Richard Linklater	A Scanner Darkly	1977	Novel	–	–
9	Next	2007	Lee Tamahori	"The Golden Man"	1953	Short story	–	–
10	Radio Free Albemuth	2010	John Alan Simon	Radio Free Albemuth	1976	Novel	–	–
11	The Adjustment Bureau	2011	George Nolfi	"Adjustment Team"	1954	Short story	–	–
12	Total Recall	2012	Len Wiseman	"We Can Remember It for You Wholesale"	1966	Short story	TV series: Total Recall 2070	1999
13	–	–	–	"The Man in the High Castle"	1962	Novel	TV series: The Man in the High Castle	2015
14	01 - The Hood Maker 02 - Impossible Planet 03 - The Commuter 04 - Crazy Diamond 05 - Real Life 06 - Human Is 07 - The Father Thing 08 - Autofac 09 - Safe and Sound 10 - Kill All Others	–	–	"The Hood Maker" "The Impossible Planet" "The Commuter" "Sales Pitch" "Exhibit Piece" "Human Is" "The Father-thing" "Autofac" "Foster, You're Dead!" "The Hanging Stranger"	1955; 1953; 1953; 1954; 1954; 1955; 1954; 1955; 1955; 1953	Short stories	TV series: Electric Dreams	2017–2018
