= Second Variety (1991 collection) =

1991 collection of science fiction stories by Philip K. Dick

- Cover of the first edition
- Author: Philip K. Dick
- Language: English
- Genre: Science fiction
- Publisher: Citadel Twilight
- Publication date: 1991
- Publication place: United States
- Media type: Print (paperback)
- Pages: 414
- ISBN: 0-8065-1226-1
- OCLC: 50852265

Second Variety is a collection of science fiction stories by American writer Philip K. Dick. It was first published by Citadel Twilight in 1991 and reprints Volume III of The Collected Stories of Philip K. Dick with the addition of the story "Second Variety". Many of the stories had originally appeared in the magazines If, Science Fiction Adventures, Science Fiction Stories, Orbit, Fantasy and Science Fiction, Imagination, Future, Galaxy Science Fiction, Beyond Fantasy Fiction, Satellite, Science Fiction Quarterly, Imaginative Tales and Space Science Fiction. There is huge overlap with the 1997 The Philip K. Dick Reader: stories 1–20 and 24 are identical.

== Contents ==
- Introduction, by John Brunner
- "Fair Game"
- "The Hanging Stranger"
- "The Eyes Have It"
- "The Golden Man"
- "The Turning Wheel"
- "The Last of the Masters"
- "The Father-Thing"
- "Strange Eden"
- "Tony and the Beetles"
- "Null-O"
- "To Serve the Master"
- "Exhibit Piece"
- "The Crawlers"
- "Sales Pitch"
- "Shell Game"
- "Upon the Dull Earth"
- "Foster, You’re Dead"
- "Pay for the Printer"
- "War Veteran"
- "The Chromium Fence"
- "Misadjustment"
- "A World of Talent"
- "Psi-Man Heal My Child!"
- "Second Variety"
- Notes
