= The Father-Thing (collection) =

1989 collection of stories by Philip K. Dick

- Dust-jacket from the first edition
- Author: Philip K. Dick
- Language: English
- Genre: Science fiction
- Publisher: Gollancz
- Publication date: 1989
- Publication place: United Kingdom
- Media type: Print (hardback)
- Pages: 376
- ISBN: 0-575-04616-3
- OCLC: 59199069

The Father-Thing is a collection of science fiction stories by American writer Philip K. Dick. It was first published by Gollancz in 1989 and reprints Volume III of The Collected Stories of Philip K. Dick. It had not previously been published as a stand-alone volume. Many of the stories had originally appeared in the magazines If, Science Fiction Adventures, Science Fiction Stories, Orbit, Fantasy and Science Fiction, Imagination, Future, Galaxy Science Fiction, Beyond Fantasy Fiction, Satellite, Science Fiction Quarterly and Imaginative Tales.

== Contents ==
- Introduction, by John Brunner
- "Fair Game"
- "The Hanging Stranger"
- "The Eyes Have It"
- "The Golden Man"
- "The Turning Wheel"
- "The Last of the Masters"
- "The Father-Thing"
- "Strange Eden"
- "Tony and the Beetles"
- "Null-O"
- "To Serve the Master"
- "Exhibit Piece"
- "The Crawlers"
- "Sales Pitch"
- "Shell Game"
- "Upon the Dull Earth"
- "Foster, You’re Dead"
- "Pay for the Printer"
- "War Veteran"
- "The Chromium Fence"
- "Misadjustment"
- "A World of Talent"
- "Psi-Man Heal My Child!"
- Notes
