= The Philip K. Dick Reader =

1997 collection of science fiction stories by Philip K. Dick

- Cover of the first edition
- Author: Philip K. Dick
- Cover artist: Zina Saunders
- Language: English
- Genre: Science fiction
- Published: 1997 (Citadel Twilight)
- Publication place: United States
- Media type: Print (paperback)
- Pages: 422
- ISBN: 0-8065-1856-1
- OCLC: 36074558

The Philip K. Dick Reader is a collection of science fiction stories by American writer Philip K. Dick. It was first published by Citadel Twilight in 1997. Many of the stories had originally appeared in the magazines If, Science Fiction Adventures, Science Fiction Stories, Orbit, Fantasy and Science Fiction, Imagination, Future, Galaxy Science Fiction, Beyond Fantasy Fiction, Satellite, Imaginative Tales, Fantastic Universe and Space Science Fiction. It is identical in content and order to the edition of volume 3 of the Collected Stories of Philip K. Dick produced by the same publisher apart from the substitution of three stories in positions 21-23 of 24 and the omission of the end notes in the Collected Stories edition. At press time, stories 21 and 24 had already been made into successful movie adaptations and stories 22 and 23 had been optioned.

== Contents ==
1. "Fair Game" (1959)
2. "The Hanging Stranger" (1953)
3. "The Eyes Have It" (1953)
4. "The Golden Man" (1954)
5. "The Turning Wheel" (1954)
6. "The Last of the Masters" (1954)
7. "The Father-Thing" (1954)
8. "Strange Eden" (1954)
9. "Tony and the Beetles" (1954)
10. "Null-O" (1958)
11. "To Serve the Master" (1956)
12. "Exhibit Piece" (1954)
13. "The Crawlers" (1954)
14. "Sales Pitch" (1954)
15. "Shell Game" (1954)
16. "Upon the Dull Earth" (1954)
17. "Foster, You're Dead!" (1955)
18. "Pay for the Printer" (1956)
19. "War Veteran" (1955)
20. "The Chromium Fence" (1955)
21. "We Can Remember It for You Wholesale" (1966)
22. "The Minority Report" (1956)
23. "Paycheck" (1953)
24. "Second Variety" (1953)
