= The Best of Philip K. Dick =

1977 collection of science fiction stories by Philip K. Dick

- Cover of the first edition.
- Author: Philip K. Dick
- Cover artist: Vincent Di Fate
- Language: English
- Series: Ballantine's Classic Library of Science Fiction
- Genre: Science fiction
- Publisher: Del Rey Books
- Publication date: 1977
- Publication place: United States
- Media type: Print (paperback)
- Pages: xiv, 450
- ISBN: 0-345-25359-0
- OCLC: 2645491
- Dewey Decimal: 813/.5/4
- LC Class: PS3554.I3 B4
- Preceded by: The Best of C. M. Kornbluth
- Followed by: The Best of Fredric Brown

The Best of Philip K. Dick is a collection of science fiction stories by American writer Philip K. Dick. It was first published by Del Rey Books in 1977 as a volume in its Classic Library of Science Fiction. Many of the stories had originally appeared in the magazines Planet Stories, Fantasy and Science Fiction, Space Science Fiction, Imagination, Astounding Stories, Galaxy Science Fiction, Amazing Stories, Science Fiction Stories and Startling Stories, as well as the anthologies Dangerous Visions and Star Science Fiction Stories No.3.

== Summary ==
The book contains nineteen short works of fiction and an afterword by the author, together with an introduction by John Brunner.

== Contents ==
- "Introduction: The Reality of Philip K. Dick" (John Brunner)
- "Beyond Lies the Wub"
- "Roog"
- "Second Variety"
- "Paycheck"
- "Impostor"
- "Colony"
- "Expendable"
- "The Days of Perky Pat"
- "Breakfast at Twilight"
- "Foster, You're Dead!"
- "The Father-Thing"
- "Service Call"
- "Autofac"
- "Human Is"
- "If There Were No Benny Cemoli"
- "Oh, to Be a Blobel!"
- "Faith of Our Fathers"
- "The Electric Ant"
- "A Little Something for Us Tempunauts"
- "Afterthoughts by the Author"
