= Selected Stories of Philip K. Dick =

2002 collection of science fiction stories by Philip K. Dick

- Dust-jacket from the first edition
- Author: Philip K. Dick
- Language: English
- Genre: Science fiction, philosophical fiction
- Publisher: Random House
- Publication date: 2002
- Publication place: United States
- Media type: Print (hardback)
- Pages: xiv, 476
- ISBN: 0-375-42151-3
- OCLC: 49421787
- Dewey Decimal: 813/.54 21
- LC Class: PS3554.I3 A6 2002

Selected Stories of Philip K. Dick is a collection of science fiction stories by American writer Philip K. Dick. It was first published by Random House in 2002. Many of the stories had originally appeared in the magazines Planet Stories, Fantasy and Science Fiction, Imagination, Space Science Fiction, Astounding, Beyond Fantasy Fiction, Orbit, Galaxy Science Fiction, Fantastic Universe, Amazing Stories, Rolling Stone College Papers, Omni and Playboy.

== Contents ==
- Introduction, by Jonathan Lethem
- "Beyond Lies the Wub"
- "Roog"
- "Paycheck"
- "Second Variety"
- "Impostor"
- "The King of the Elves"
- "Adjustment Team"
- "Foster, You're Dead!"
- "Upon the Dull Earth"
- "Autofac"
- "The Minority Report"
- "The Days of Perky Pat"
- "Precious Artifact"
- "A Game of Unchance"
- "We Can Remember It for You Wholesale"
- "Faith of Our Fathers"
- "The Electric Ant"
- "A Little Something for Us Tempunauts"
- "The Exit Door Leads In"
- "Rautavaara's Case"
- "I Hope I Shall Arrive Soon"

== Sources ==
- Brown, Charles N.; William G. Contento. "The Locus Index to Science Fiction (2002)".
