= The Little Black Box (collection) =

1990 collection of stories by Philip K. Dick

- Dust-jacket from the first edition
- Author: Philip K. Dick
- Language: English
- Genre: Science fiction
- Publisher: Gollancz
- Publication date: 1990
- Publication place: United Kingdom
- Media type: Print (hardback)
- Pages: 395
- ISBN: 0-575-04845-X
- OCLC: 22627626

The Little Black Box is a collection of science fiction stories by American writer Philip K. Dick. It was first published by Gollancz in 1990 and reprints Volume V of The Collected Stories of Philip K. Dick. It had not previously been published as a stand-alone volume. Many of the stories had originally appeared in the magazines Worlds of Tomorrow, Galaxy Science Fiction, Amazing Stories, Fantasy and Science Fiction, Famous Science Fiction, Niekas, Rolling Stone College Papers, Interzone, Playboy, Omni and The Yuba City High Times.

== Contents ==
- Introduction, by Thomas M. Disch
- "The Little Black Box"
- "The War with the Fnools"
- "A Game of Unchance"
- "Precious Artifact"
- "Retreat Syndrome"
- "A Terran Odyssey"
- "Your Appointment Will Be Yesterday"
- "Holy Quarrel"
- "We Can Remember It for You Wholesale"
- "Not By Its Cover"
- "Return Match"
- "Faith of Our Fathers"
- "The Story to End All Stories for Harlan Ellison’s Anthology Dangerous Visions"
- "The Electric Ant"
- "Cadbury, the Beaver Who Lacked"
- "A Little Something for Us Tempunauts"
- "The Pre-persons"
- "The Eye of the Sibyl"
- "The Day Mr. Computer Fell out of its Tree"
- "The Exit Door Leads In"
- "Chains of Air, Web of Aether"
- "Strange Memories of Death"
- "I Hope I Shall Arrive Soon"
- "Rautavaara's Case"
- "The Alien Mind"
- Notes
