= Second Variety (1989 collection) =

Short story collection by Philip K. Dick

- Dust-jacket from the first edition
- Author: Philip K. Dick
- Language: English
- Genre: Science fiction
- Publisher: Gollancz
- Publication date: 1989
- Publication place: United Kingdom
- Media type: Print (hardback)
- Pages: 395
- ISBN: 0-575-04460-8
- OCLC: 19321845

Second Variety is a collection of science fiction stories by American writer Philip K. Dick. It was first published by Gollancz in 1989 and reprints Volume II of The Collected Stories of Philip K. Dick. It had not previously been published as a stand-alone volume. Many of the stories had originally appeared in the magazines Fantasy Fiction, Fantastic Universe, Space Science Fiction, Imagination, If, Amazing Stories, Science Fiction Quarterly, Startling Stories, Cosmos, Orbit, Astounding and Planet Stories. The 1990 Citadel collection We Can Remember It for You Wholesale is identical except that it has "We Can Remember It for You Wholesale" instead of "Second Variety".

== Contents ==
- Introduction, by Norman Spinrad
- "The Cookie Lady"
- "Beyond the Door"
- "Second Variety"
- "Jon’s World"
- "The Cosmic Poachers"
- "Progeny"
- "Some Kinds of Life"
- "Martians Come in Clouds"
- "The Commuter"
- "The World She Wanted"
- "A Surface Raid"
- "Project: Earth"
- "The Trouble with Bubbles"
- "Breakfast at Twilight"
- "A Present for Pat"
- "The Hood Maker"
- "Of Withered Apples"
- "Human Is"
- "Adjustment Team"
- "The Impossible Planet"
- "Impostor"
- "James P. Crow"
- "Planet for Transients"
- "Small Town"
- "Souvenir"
- "Survey Team"
- "Prominent Author"
- Notes
