= We Can Remember It for You Wholesale (collection) =

1990 collection of science fiction stories by Philip K. Dick

- Cover of the first edition
- Author: Philip K. Dick
- Cover artist: Norris Burroughs
- Language: English
- Genre: Science fiction
- Publisher: Citadel Twilight
- Publication date: 1990
- Publication place: United States
- Media type: Print (paperback)
- Pages: 381
- ISBN: 0-8065-1209-1
- OCLC: 50852119

We Can Remember It for You Wholesale is a collection of science fiction stories by American writer Philip K. Dick. It was first published by Citadel Twilight in 1990 and reprints Volume II of The Collected Stories of Philip K. Dick replacing the story "Second Variety" with "We Can Remember It for You Wholesale". Many of the stories had originally appeared in the magazines Fantasy Fiction, Fantastic Universe, Fantasy and Science Fiction, Imagination, If, Amazing Stories, Science Fiction Quarterly, Startling Stories, Cosmos, Orbit, Astounding, and Planet Stories.

== Contents ==
- Introduction, by Norman Spinrad
- "The Cookie Lady"
- "Beyond the Door"
- "Prominent Author"
- "We Can Remember It for You Wholesale"
- "Jon’s World"
- "The Cosmic Poachers"
- "Progeny"
- "Some Kinds of Life"
- "Martians Come in Clouds"
- "The Commuter"
- "The World She Wanted"
- "A Surface Raid"
- "Project: Earth"
- "The Trouble with Bubbles"
- "Breakfast at Twilight"
- "A Present for Pat"
- "The Hood Maker"
- "Of Withered Apples"
- "Human Is"
- "Adjustment Team"
- "The Impossible Planet"
- "Impostor"
- "James P. Crow"
- "Planet for Transients"
- "Small Town"
- "Souvenir"
- "Survey Team"
