= Vintage PKD =

2006 collection of fiction stories, novel excerpts and non-fiction by Philip K. Dick

- Cover of the first edition
- Author: Philip K. Dick
- Language: English
- Genre: Science fiction
- Publisher: Vintage Books
- Publication date: 2006
- Publication place: United States
- Media type: Print (paperback)
- Pages: 189 pp
- ISBN: 1-4000-9607-3
- OCLC: 62741556
- Dewey Decimal: 813/.54 22
- LC Class: PS3554.I3 A6 2006

Vintage PKD is a collection of science fiction stories, novel excerpts and non-fiction by Philip K. Dick. It was first published by Vintage Books in 2006.

== Contents ==
=== Excerpts from novels ===
- The Man in the High Castle
- A Scanner Darkly
- The Three Stigmata of Palmer Eldritch
- Ubik
- VALIS

=== Stories ===
- "The Days of Perky Pat"
- "I Hope I Shall Arrive Soon"
- "A Little Something for Us Tempunauts"

=== Essay ===
- "The Lucky Dog Pet Store" (Introduction to The Golden Man)

=== Letters ===
- "The Zebra Papers"
