= Robots, Androids, and Mechanical Oddities =

1984 collection of science fiction stories by Philip K. Dick

Robots, Androids, and Mechanical Oddities: The Science Fiction of Philip K. Dick
- Cover of the first edition
- Author: Philip K. Dick
- Language: English
- Genre: Science fiction
- Publisher: Southern Illinois University Press
- Publication date: 1984
- Publication place: United States
- Media type: Print (hardback)
- Pages: ix, 261
- ISBN: 0-8093-1159-3
- OCLC: 9970357
- Dewey Decimal: 813/.54 19
- LC Class: PS3554.I3 A6 1984

Robots, Androids, and Mechanical Oddities: The Science Fiction of Philip K. Dick is a collection of science fiction stories by American writer Philip K. Dick. It was first published by the Southern Illinois University Press in 1984 and was edited by Patricia S. Warrick and Martin H. Greenberg. The stories had originally appeared in the magazines Fantasy and Science Fiction, Galaxy Science Fiction, Space Science Fiction, Astounding, Future, Orbit, Science Fiction Stories, Imagination, Amazing Stories, Rolling Stone College Papers and Playboy.

== Contents ==
- Introduction, by Patricia S. Warrick & Martin H. Greenberg
- "The Little Movement"
- "The Defenders"
- "The Preserving Machine"
- "Second Variety"
- "Impostor"
- "Sales Pitch"
- "The Last of the Masters"
- "Service Call"
- "Autofac"
- "To Serve the Master"
- "War Game"
- "A Game of Unchance"
- "The Electric Ant"
- "The Exit Door Leads In"
- "Frozen Journey" (Title changed to "I Hope I Shall Arrive Soon".)
