= The Golden Man (collection) =

Short story collection by Philip K. Dick

- Cover of the first edition
- Author: Philip K. Dick
- Language: English
- Genre: Science fiction
- Publisher: Berkley Books
- Publication date: 1980
- Publication place: United States
- Media type: Print (paperback)
- Pages: 337 pp
- ISBN: 0-425-04288-X
- OCLC: 6687762

The Golden Man is a collection of science fiction stories by American writer Philip K. Dick. It was first published by Berkley Books in 1980. The stories had originally appeared in the magazines If, Galaxy Science Fiction, Beyond Fantasy Fiction, Worlds of Tomorrow, Science Fiction Stories, Orbit Science Fiction, Future, Amazing Stories and Fantasy and Science Fiction

== Contents ==
- Foreword, by Mark Hurst
- Introduction, by Philip K. Dick
- "The Golden Man" (1954)
- "Return Match" (1967)
- "The King of the Elves" (1953)
- "The Mold of Yancy" (1955)
- "Not By Its Cover" (1968)
- "The Little Black Box" (1964)
- "The Unreconstructed M" (1957)
- "The War with the Fnools" (1964)
- "The Last of the Masters" (1954)
- "Meddler" (1954)
- "A Game of Unchance" (1964)
- "Sales Pitch" (1954)
- "Precious Artifact" (1964)
- "Small Town" (1954)
- "The Pre-persons" (1974)
- Story Notes
- Afterword

== Reception ==
Thomas M. Disch reported that the collection included a wide range of work, from some of Dick's best to outright "turkeys", concluding "Dick is of that stature where even his failures merit publication."
