= Our Friends from Frolix 8 =

1970 science fiction novel by Philip K. Dick

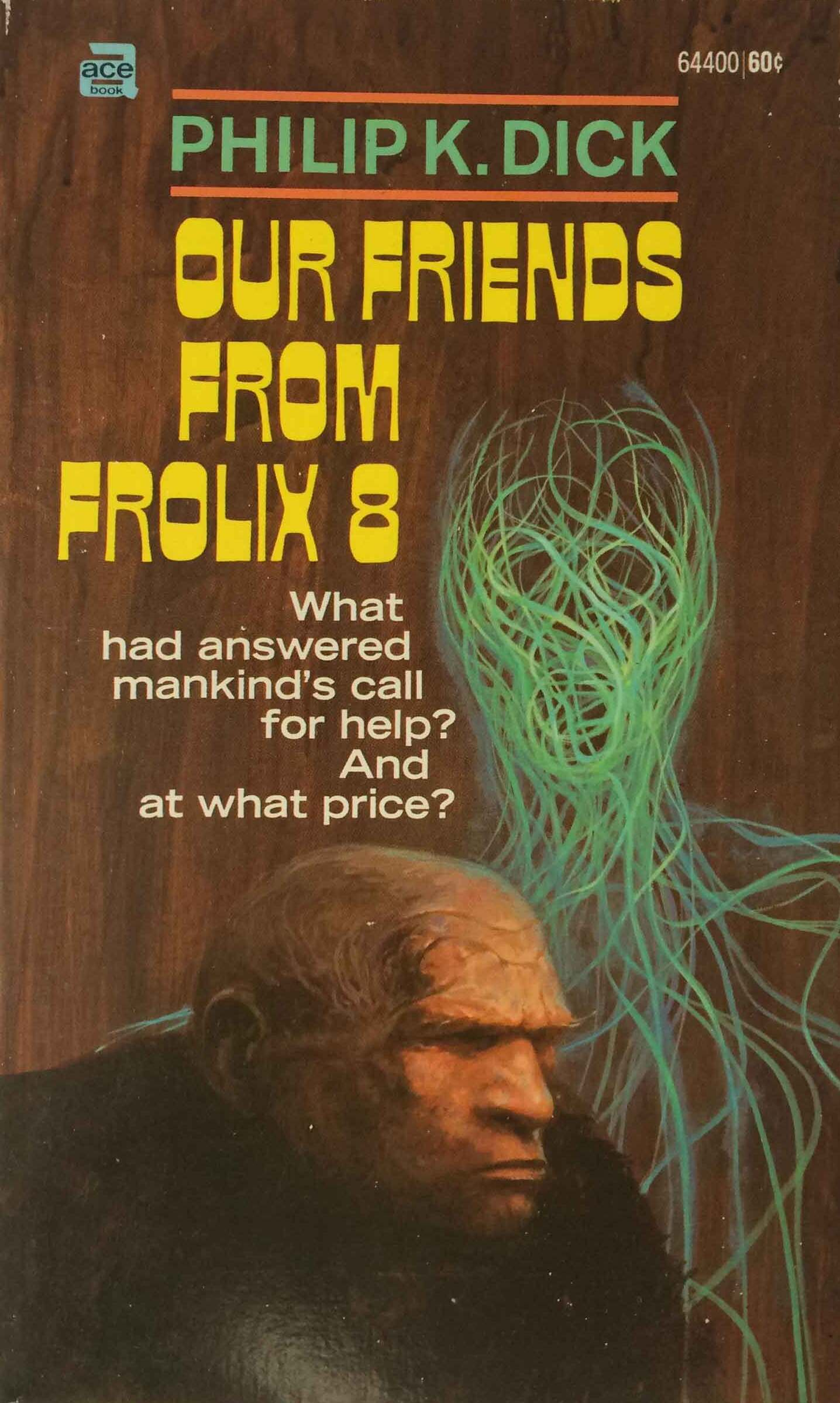
- Cover of first edition (paperback), illustrated by John Schoenherr
- Author: Philip K. Dick
- Language: English
- Genre: Science fiction
- Publisher: Ace Books
- Publication date: 1970
- Publication place: United States
- Media type: Print (paperback)
- Pages: 189
- ISBN: 0-441-64400-7
- OCLC: 8131785

Our Friends from Frolix 8 is a science fiction novel by American writer Philip K. Dick. It was written from 1968 to 1969 and was published in 1970 by Ace Books. The novel is set in the 22nd century, when humanity is ruled by mutated humans, "New Men" and "Unusuals", while normal "Old Men" are discriminated against. The story follows Nick Appleton, a low-class Old Man worker who becomes a subversive to the system, and Willis Gram, the Unusual ruler of the Earth. Separately, resistance leader Thors Provoni has left the planet to find an ally to the Old Men, finally returning with an alien from far away in space. The novel is best known for a single scene where the characters discuss the dead body of God having been found in space.

Frolix 8 was written on commission for Ace Books in a period where Dick was short on money, and he himself stated that the book was a "regression" and a "throwaway". The novel is generally viewed as a poorer effort by Dick, with scholars and critics criticizing it for its unoriginality, dialogue and plot; literary scholar Patricia S. Warrick commented that "if an award were given for the most sterile Dick novel, Our Friends from Frolix 8 (1970) would be one of the leading candidates." Some of its ideas were praised, and its themes and contents have been seen as a throwback to Dick's earlier novels. The scene involving the death of God was viewed as foreshadowing themes found in Dick's later works.

== Plot ==
In the 22nd century, (Note: The date given for the present year is inconsistent. It says the mutants have been in power for 50 years, since 2085, so the present day should be 2135, however 105-year-old Provoni says he was 18 in 2103, which would make the present year 2190.) the Earth is ruled by two classes of evolved superhuman men: New Men, who have incredible intelligence and enlarged heads, and Unusuals, who possess paranormal abilities such as telepathy, telekinesis and precognition. Old Men, those with neither of these sets of powers (who still compose most of the population), are oppressed and disgruntled. The state heavily polices and surveils them, and dissident Old Men who refuse to submit are placed in concentration camps on the moon. A resistance figure known as Thors Provoni, who long ago went deep into space to find help to put the Old Men back in power, has finally announced his impending return. He has found an ally in Morgo Rahn Wilc, a Frolixian from the Proxima system. The Frolixians are a race of large, sentient protoplasmic blobs.

Nick Appleton, a lowly tire regroover, is further disillusioned with the system after his son Bobby fails the civil service examination, as the test is geared toward passing only New Men and Unusuals. Meanwhile, authorities are holding Eric Cordon, the leader of the Under Men (the Old Men resistance), in prison and are preparing for his execution. This in combination with his son's exam failure radicalizes Appleton, and he falls for Charlotte "Charley" Boyer, a sixteen-year-old subversive who distributes Cordonite resistance literature together with her abusive alcoholic boyfriend. After the authorities discover that Appleton has become a subversive, they attempt to apprehend him and Charley, resulting in Appleton's arrest. Appleton's turn to subversion worries the authorities, as Appleton, unknowingly, is statistically significant as an average man. Appleton is brought before Willis Gram, the Council Chairman ruler, a mind-reading Unusual. Gram is insecure and dissatisfied with his wife, who he is plotting to kill. Through his observation of Appleton, he discovers and falls in love with Charley. Out of jealousy, he makes Appleton's profession of tire regrooving illegal.

While returning to Earth, Provoni has conversations with Morgo, who has encircled Provoni's ship, questioning Morgo about his intentions and discussing the nature of both of their species. The nature of the Frolixian species is to absorb and then consume, having peacefully eliminated all other animals on their home planet through sterilization to facilitate their expansion process. The Frolixians' claimed motive for helping mankind is to steal knowledge of Earth's unique creations, quaint things like typewriters and 3D film systems that the Frolixians find unique and interesting; Provoni worries the Frolixians may actually want to take over the Earth, having run out of space on their home planet. Provoni's ship eludes Earth's defenses and rapidly nears Earth, leading to paranoid fears among the ruling elite about the possibility of violent alien invasion and their potential overthrowing. Gram fears the return of Provoni and turns to a prominent New Man scientist, Amos Ild, to foresee the future. Ild predicts through the New Man science of "neutrologics" that Provoni will be defeated with certainty. Charley predicts that Provoni will win, based on nothing.

Provoni lands, and Morgo's body that is enveloping the ship guards it from all attempts to strike it down. Provoni is actually a New Man and an Unusual at the same time; Morgo removes all the powers of all other Unusuals and New Men through physically removing parts of their brains. This renders the Unusuals normal, but the New Men become intellectually disabled and like children. Charley and Appleton's vehicle crashes into an army vehicle responding to Provoni, killing Charley and injuring Appleton. The government collapses and Gram, having lost his ability to read minds, surrenders his power. In the end, a disempowered New Man expresses his thoughts about God in a childlike way.

== Background and publication history ==
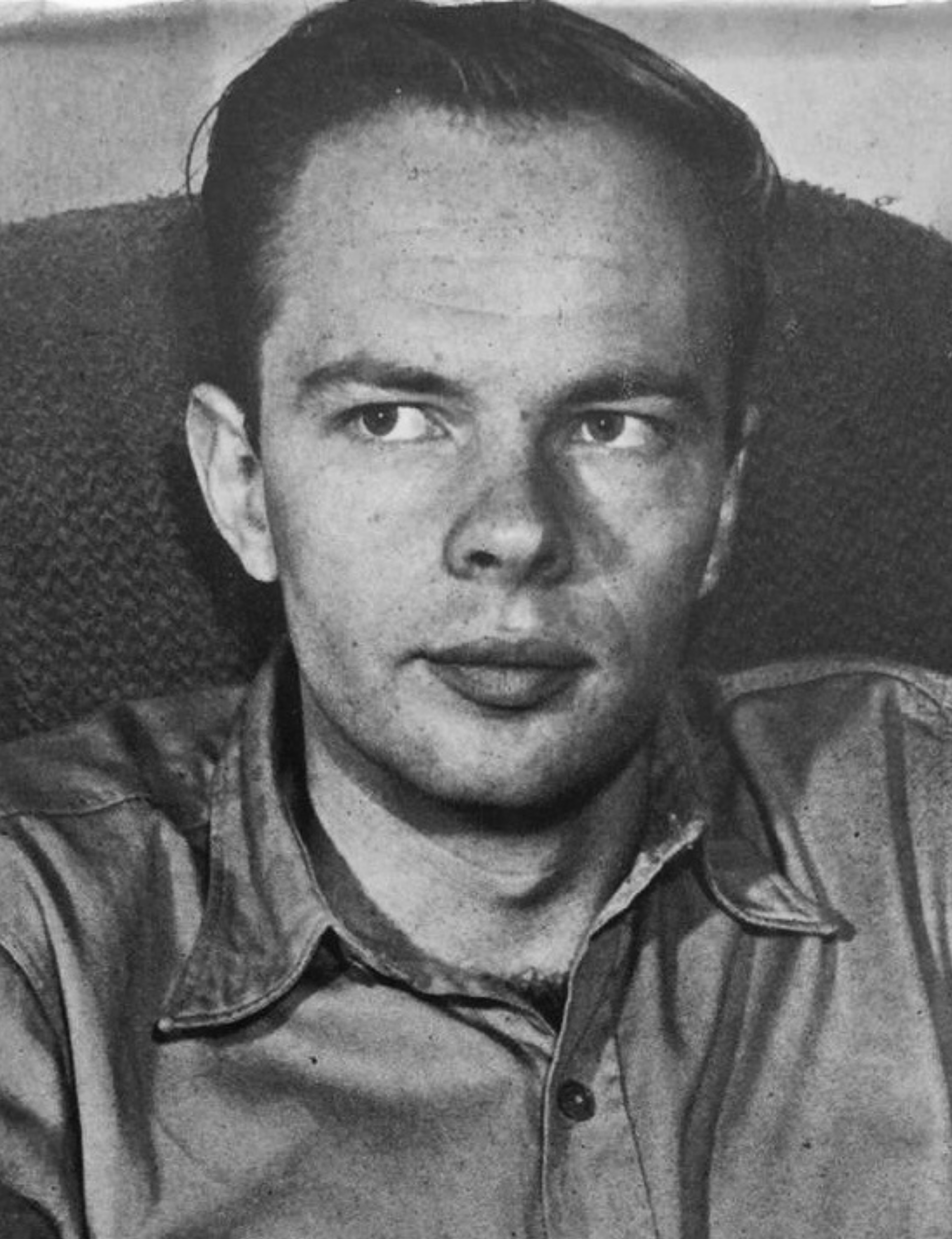
Philip K. Dick in the early 1960s, taken by Arthur Knight

Philip K. Dick was an American science fiction author, one of the most well known writers in the genre. The novel was written from 1968 to 1969, and completed 2 July 1969. The novel was commissioned by Ace Books, as Dick was short on money. Its contract called for 70,000 words, higher than 60,000 in previous contracts, which led to Dick assuming that Ace wanted a longer novel; he delivered it late as the contract had it due March 1969. Its working title was Our Friends from Frolix 5; its outline was initially completed November 6, 1968, and was eventually published in the 19th issue of the Philip K. Dick Society newsletter in January 1989 as Outline for Our Friends from Frolix 8. This outline differs in many ways from the final, published version.

While the book was being written, Dick said in a letter to Donald A. Wollheim, the editor-in-chief of Ace Books, that:

Not since EYE IN THE SKY have I so much enjoyed working on a novel. Usually I get up at noon; while writing this I got up at seven a.m. and tottered my way to the typewriter, my mind filled with dialog. There is nothing about reality-versus-illusion in it, no hallucinations, etc. I did depart from the latter part of the outline, but the book remains as the outline described it; I think it is fair to say that it is true to the outline.

He later called the book a "throwaway" and a "regression" and said he had simply written it for money. He said of the time that he wrote it that:

At that point I was beginning to become desperate because I was petrified, I mean ossified in my field. My structure, my characters were ossified. Everything.

Dick wrote the book in a period of personal problems, drug use, and an extreme writing schedule. There was a four year gap between Frolix 8 and Dick's next book, Flow My Tears, the Policeman Said, which was not published until 1974.

The book was first published in 1970 in paperback format by Ace Books. Other books of his in this period usually had their first printing in hardcover. The cover of the first edition paperback was illustrated by John Schoenherr. A French translation, Message de Frolix 8, was published by Éditions OPTA in their Anti-mondes collection, for presenting the best of science fiction. Frolix 8 was the 13th book of his to be translated into French. An Italian translation done by Gianni Montanari, Nostri amici di Frolix 8, was published by Fanucci Editore in 1999.

== Themes ==
The book explores themes of power and class struggle. Other themes include freedom of choice, commitment to a cause, and the involvement of other powers in human affairs, as the Frolixian's motives are often ambiguous. Douglas A. Mackey viewed the Frolixian as representing "the egoless moral integrity toward which humanity is rising". Other books of Dick had already dealt with the idea of society being controlled by a small group of men, including one of his earlier novels, Solar Lottery; both books similarly lead by space travels searching for other worlds. Charles Thorpe compared the struggle between the New and Old Men to the conflict between the Bes and Ges in another Dick's 1964 novel The Simulacra, comparing both to the rise of newer modes of societal advancement replacing older ones in American society. The book's emphasis on politically powerful characters is shared with The Simulacra, Now Wait for Last Year, and The Penultimate Truth.

Science fiction writer and scholar Kim Stanley Robinson described the ending of the book as a deus ex machina, but argued that the hopefulness of this ending was "ambiguous at best". The novel is most famous for a single joke, where Nick and Charley discuss that the corpse of God had been found in space:

"Listen to this, 'God tells us-'"

"God is dead," Nick said. 'They found his carcass in 2019. Floating out in space near Alpha."

"They found the remains of an organism advanced several thousand times over what we are," Charley said. "And it evidently could create habitable worlds and populate them with living organisms, derived from itself. But that doesn't prove it was God."

"I think it was God."

Robinson noted this as one of the earliest discussions of religion in Dick's works, which would show up more often in later novels.

The novel's placement among Dick's works of the time has been subject to debate. Academic Patricia S. Warrick said it was the end of what she called Dick's "Entropic" period. Mackey called Frolix 8 "in a sense a throwback"; Warrick said that themes common in Dick's novels from the mid 1950s to 1960s, like violence, economic exploitation, media manipulation, totalitarianism and loss of morals, were present here as well, though they only "stir[red] feebly." Jorge Rosa described the novel as "atypical" for that period of Dick's writings. Gregg Rickman argued otherwise, saying that it did belong in the surrounding period of Dick's writings, tying into other works of the time with Dick's overall concern being "a God-figure coming to save us". Rosa described the novel as a partial reversing of the premise of The Three Stigmata of Palmer Eldritch, with a character returning from space, but with the return in question happening instead at the end rather than the beginning, and with Provoni as a benign figure instead of an evil one like Palmer Eldritch.

== Reception ==
Academic Patricia S. Warrick said of Frolix 8 that "if an award were given for the most sterile Dick novel, Our Friends from Frolix 8 (1970) would be one of the leading candidates." Andrew M. Butler said it was dull in comparison to Dick's other novels of the time, and said that "dystopia meets space opera is all you can say about it". A contemporary review from the SF zine Luna Monthly praised Frolix 8 as a "readable and entertaining" book. They said it was easier to follow than most of the author's works, calling its plot well structured and noting its scene and POV shifts to be typical of him. Darrell Schweitzer, in the Science Fiction Review in 1978 called it "not top drawer Dick", but said that even "his middle drawers are more interesting than most", while a review in the British SF magazine Vector called it "a lively, entertaining book, abrim with ideas", that presents "no solutions to the various moral dilemmas" portrayed within.

The plot received criticism, particularly for its perceived lack of originality compared both to general SF and Dick's other works. Mackey called the plot thin compared to early 1960s books from Dick, with some of the weaknesses of more standard SF conventions appearing. He criticized its style as slack and the dialogue of the characters, which he characterized as babbling. Darko Suvin described the plot points as happening like a "succession of rabbits out of a hat, in a quite arbitrary way". Michael Rogers, writing for the Library Journal, described the novel as being "couched in the usual sf trappings", though noted it would appeal to those who were already fans of Dick and Blade Runner. Warrick said that in writing the book, Dick had taken from his old works ideas and hastily put them together, in what she described as a "haphazard arrangement held with staples and binder twine", with "not one original idea". Andrevon expressed a similar sentiment, saying that Dick had "merely systematically and inspiredly reused schemes he had once used infinitely better" in other works. Phillip Lumb, writing for the British newspaper the Eastern Daily Press, called it "a well thought out and convincing tale", saying that the story was written skillfully, but criticized the "rather rushed and unconvincing ending".

French reviewers were critical. Daniel Phi, writing in Horizons du Fantastique, disliked the novel, and Jean-Pierre Andrevon described it as "banal, empty, badly constructed, like a bad van Vogt novel" and said it was "as dull and worn-out as possible". Reviewing the French translation alongside A Maze of Death, Andervon said both novels were among his worst; while disliking both, he noted A Maze of Death as still better than Our Friends from Frolix 8, which he called a "great mediocrity". Valerio De Angelis and Umberto Rossi also compared it to the works of SF author A. E. van Vogt; they said that while it had a poorly constructed plot, it was at times an excellent satire of TV commentary. While describing it as "not successful", Warrick said it contained "passages rich with interesting ideas and characters", which allowed for a better understanding of Dick's creativity. She pointed out Provoni's character as an example of this. Andrevon criticized the setting as unbelievable with the powers of the New Men seeming to be nothing more than the ability to understand higher math even though they behaved "like idiots"; he said that the setting was "so tenuous, so hollow, so badly structured, that a gust of wind would be enough to topple it".
