= Impossible Planet =

Impossible Planet may refer to:

- "Impossible Planet", an episode of Philip K. Dick's Electric Dreams
- "The Impossible Planet", an episode of Doctor Who
- "The Impossible Planet" (short story), a short story by Philip K. Dick
