= Golden Man =

Goldan Man may refer to:

- "The Golden Man", a science fiction short story by American writer Philip K. Dick
- Golden Man (Kazakhstan)
