= Heliogabalus =

Heliogabalus may refer to:

- Elagabalus (c. 203–222), Roman Emperor
- Elagabalus (deity), a Syro-Roman sun god
- Heliogabalus, a fictional character in Philip K. Dick's novel Martian Time-Slip
