= Teep =

Teep or teeps may refer to:

- Teep kick or front kick, in martial arts
- Teep (decoration), facial decor
- Teeps, fictional characters with telepathic powers in "The Hood Maker" by Philip K. Dick
- TEEPS, an electric smoking system
- Technically, Environmentally and Economically Practicable, a waste management acronym
- Tom Parsons (cricketer) (born 1987), known as Teeps
- Total effective equipment performance (TEEP), a measure of overall equipment effectiveness

== See also ==
- Telepathy
- Tipi, also teepee, is a cone-shaped tent
