= Mary and the Giant =

Novel by Philip K. Dick

- Cover of first edition (hardcover)
- Author: Philip K. Dick
- Language: English
- Genre: novel
- Publisher: Arbor House
- Publication date: 1987
- Publication place: United States
- Media type: Print (hardback & paperback)
- Pages: 230 pp
- ISBN: 0-87795-850-5
- OCLC: 14691945
- Dewey Decimal: 813/.54 19
- LC Class: PS3554.I3 M3 1987

Mary and the Giant is an early, non-science fiction novel written by Philip K. Dick in the years between 1953 and 1955, but not published until 1987.

== Plot introduction ==
In 1953, Joseph Schilling arrives in Pacific Park, Southern California. He establishes a small music shop, and later, Danny and Beth Coombes join him. Mary Anne Reynolds is also interviewed for a position at the shop, but backs off after Schilling touches her. After leaving home, Carleton Tweaney, an African-American lounge singer (and her lover) finds her a new home. However, Beth has already slept with Joseph, and now moves on to Carleton. Provoked by her affair, Danny tries to shoot Carleton, but instead dies himself. Carleton and Mary Anne break up, and she decides to work for Schilling after all, as well as becoming sexually involved with him, despite a forty-year age difference. He helps her to rent and renovate her own apartment, but Mary Anne decides to live in a dilapidated African American neighbourhood instead. In an epilogue, she has married Paul Nitz, a pianist who works with Carleton.

The author himself once described the novel as "a retelling of Mozart's Don Giovanni, with Schilling seduced and destroyed by a young woman".

== See also ==
- Bibliography of Philip K. Dick
