= The Broken Bubble =

Novel by Philip K. Dick

- Cover of first edition (hardcover)
- Author: Philip K. Dick
- Language: English
- Genre: Novel
- Publisher: Arbor House
- Publication date: 1988
- Publication place: United States
- Media type: Print (hardback & paperback)
- Pages: 246
- ISBN: 1-55710-012-8
- OCLC: 17412624
- Dewey Decimal: 813/.54 19
- LC Class: PS3554.I3 B76 1988

The Broken Bubble is an early mainstream novel by American science fiction writer Philip K. Dick. It was written around 1956 under the longer title The Broken Bubble of Thisbe Holt but was rejected for publication in the 1950s, as were all of Dick's "straight" (non-SF) novels at the time. It was published in hardcover posthumously with a shortened title in 1988.

== Plot summary ==
The lives of two couples intertwine in mid-1950s California, and all learn important lessons about life. Jim Briskin is a classical music DJ. He and his ex-wife Patricia Gray are still very much in love but have divorced because he is sterile. The two divorcees meet a teenaged married couple named Art and Rachael and essentially swap partners.

Pat passionately loves the youthful but dysfunctional Art, almost as though he were her child, and the two of them have an abusive relationship in which he gives her a black eye. Meanwhile, Jim and Rachael hook up and Rachael offers to ditch Art and move to Mexico with Jim where he will adopt her baby and raise it as his own. In the end, however, maturity prevails and they all return to their original partners.

Miss Thisbe Holt of the original title is actually a very minor character in the book. She is a well-endowed stripper who performs at an optometrists convention which occurs near the very end of the novel. Her act consists of climbing naked into a large clear plastic ball which the optometrists then roll around the hotel suite to more thoroughly examine her ample personal assets. The ball is demolished when it's later filled with debris and pushed off the hotel roof by the inebriated optometrists.

The shortened title seems more obviously appropriate in that its lack of specificity allows it to do double duty in serving as a metaphor symbolizing the irreversible effects of the various life-altering events that occur within the orbits of the main characters.

== See also ==
- Bibliography of Philip K. Dick
