= Puttering About in a Small Land =

Novel by Philip K. Dick

- Cover of first edition (hardcover)
- Author: Philip K. Dick
- Language: English
- Publisher: Academy Chicago Publishers
- Publication date: 1985
- Publication place: United States
- Media type: Print (hardback & paperback)
- Pages: 291
- ISBN: 0-89733-149-4
- OCLC: 12371493
- Dewey Decimal: 813/.54 19
- LC Class: PS3554.I3 P8 1985

Puttering About in a Small Land is an early non-science fiction novel by American science fiction author Philip K. Dick. It was written sometime in 1957, but remained unpublished until it was released posthumously in 1985.

== Plot summary ==
In 1944, Virginia Watson and Roger Lindahl meet in Washington DC. They marry after Roger divorces his first wife Teddy and abandons his daughter by her as well. Their subsequent move to Los Angeles to work in a munitions factory proves extremely profitable. But Roger spends the money far faster than it took them to earn it. By 1953, Roger has opened a television sales and repair shop, while Virginia is trying to enroll their 7-year-old son Gregg in an expensive boarding school in Ojai against Roger's wishes.

Liz Bonner, another parent, persuades Roger to agree to Gregg's enrollment by offering to share the perilous and exhausting driving duties involved in transporting their children over the nearby mountains to and from Ojai.

There is a particular private exchange between Roger Lindahl and Marion Watson, Virginia's mother, that very graphically depicts Roger's highly immature, volatile and unpredictable nature. The trigger for his outburst is the realization that his hostile mother-in-law (as a favor only to her daughter) plans on providing substantial financial backing for his business.

But there is yet another financial interloper afoot. "Chic" or Charles Bonner, Liz's husband, wants to buy into Roger's shop as a partner, but Lindahl declines his offer and promptly begins an affair with a very accommodating Liz. Virginia finds out, although Chic remains unaware, and she hectors Roger into letting her assume legal ownership of the shop with Chic. Unfortunately, however, both marriages have been irreparably damaged. Chic and Liz end up getting divorced. Roger and Virginia remain tenuously married, and a philandering Roger remains in contact with Liz through the private school. The final chapter closes with ever-impulsive Roger dumping Gregg off at home, pilfering a carload of expensive T.V. sets from the store and hightailing it to Chicago.

== See also ==
- Bibliography of Philip K. Dick
