= A Maze of Death =

1970 novel by Philip K. Dick

- Cover of first edition (hardcover)
- Author: Philip K. Dick
- Language: English
- Genre: Science fiction
- Publisher: Doubleday
- Publication date: 1970
- Publication place: United States
- Media type: Print (Hardcover & Paperback)
- Pages: 216

A Maze of Death 1971 Paperback Library edition.

A Maze of Death is a 1970 science fiction novel by American writer Philip K. Dick. Like many of Dick's novels, it portrays what appears to be a drab and harsh off-world human colony and explores the difference between reality and perception. It is one of his few books to examine the human death instinct and capacity for murder and is one of his darkest novels.

== Synopsis ==
The plot revolves around fourteen colonists of the planet Delmak-O. They are: Betty Jo Berm, a linguist; elderly Bert Kosler, settlement custodian; Maggie Walsh, a theologian; Ignatz Thugg, who oversees thermoplastics; Milton Babble, a physician; Wade Frazer, a psychologist; Tony Dunkelwelt, a geologist; Glen Belsnor, who specialises in telecommunications; Susie Smart, a typist; Roberta Rockingham, a sociologist; Ben Tallchief, a naturalist; Seth and Mary Morley, a marine biologist couple; and Ned Russell, an economist.

The colonists travel in one-way rockets consecutively to Delmak-O to take part in an unknown colonization project. After all landed, their assignment should be communicated via satellite. However, the communication system fails, leaving the colonists without contact to the outside world. Thus, the colonists try to identify their task and explore Delmak-O.

Delmak-O seems to be inhabited by both real and artificial beings and enormous cube-shaped, gelatinous objects ("tenches") that duplicate items presented to them and give out advice, in anagrams reminiscent of the I Ching. In addition, various members of the group report sightings of a large "Building." As various calamities continue to befall each character, part of the group ventures out to find the mysterious structure. Each member of the group perceives the Building's entrance motto, and thus its purpose, differently.

One by one, the characters Tallchief, Smart, Berm, Dunkelwelt, Kosler and Walsh either kill themselves or are killed under mysterious circumstances. During a fight between the remaining colonists Seth Morley is shot through the shoulder causing an artery to be severed. While recovering from an attempt to repair the artery, Morley is abducted by armed men who kill Belsnor. They put Morley aboard a small flying craft but Morley overpowers them and takes control of the craft. With it he discovers that Delmak-O seems in fact to be Earth, and he returns to the group to report this.

The group then comes to the conclusion that they are all criminally insane and part of a psychiatric experiment in rehabilitation. Once they admit to having killed the other members they conclude that the experiment must have been a failure. It is at this point that they notice that each of them is tattooed with the phrase, "Persus 9." They decide to ask a tench what this means but doing so causes the tench to explode and the world around them to crumble to pieces.

All of them, including the colonists thought to be dead, awake to find that they are actually the crew of the spaceship Persus 9, stranded in orbit around a dead star with no way of calling for help. Their experiences had been a kind of virtual reality, a computer-generated religion that synthesized their beliefs. Their dormancy should save energy of the ship's life support systems for the unlikely case someone would detect the stranded ship and rescue them. It becomes clear that they already completed several cycles of virtual reality dormancy, due to the gradual disintegration, each more nightmarish than the previous one. Seth Morley is depressed by this and wonders whether it would be better to let all the air out from the ship and thus kill them all rather than live out the rest of their lives engaging in virtual realities. However, a deity known as the Intercessor, supposedly existing only in the virtual reality program and not a part of the "real" world, appears before Morley and stops him, stating that death is for each individual to decide for themselves. It offers Morley a choice of possible forms to be reborn as, and he decides on "a cactus on some warm world... to be asleep but still aware of the sun and of myself". The Intercessor guides him into the stars, stating he will "live and sleep for a thousand years".

The others, unconcerned with his disappearance, embark on another hallucination which resembles the previous one, only without Seth Morley.

== Reception ==
Palmer (2003) presents the novel as an allegoric and starkly misanthropic depiction of generation ships, in which to the cast of human characters, "murders are simply the way in which the collective, expressing the animosities that have built up while they have been marooned, eliminates this or that unpopular [individual]." Suvin et al. (2002) note, "Most of A Maze is a banalized ontology, with insufficient narrative control and a plot of successive murders [...] a la Christie's And Then There Were None, which is pulled back into epistemology in the last dozen pages."

== See also ==
- "Faith of Our Fathers"
- Simulated reality
