= The Crack in Space =

1966 novel by Philip K. Dick

- Cover of first edition (paperback)
- Author: Philip K. Dick
- Cover artist: Jerome Podwil
- Language: English
- Genre: Science fiction
- Publisher: Ace Books
- Publication date: 1966
- Publication place: United States
- Media type: Print (hardback & paperback)
- Pages: 190

The Crack in Space is a 1966 science fiction novel by American writer Philip K. Dick. In the United Kingdom, it has been published under the title of the original novella, Cantata 140, published in the July 1964 issue of The Magazine of Fantasy & Science Fiction. This original title refers to the short title in English, Sleepers Awake, of J.S. Bach's Cantata BWV 140 and the novel's 'bibs', the millions sleeping in suspended animation. Both are based on the short story Prominent Author. The common elements are the Jiffi-scuttler transport device, the company, Terran Development, that manufactures it (and still exists to play a large role in the later works), and a summary of Prominent Author as an event of the past in chapter 2. The "crack in space" is a defect in Jiffi-scuttler operation that allows access to the Earth (in Prominent Author) and to parallel Earths (in the later works) at various times and locations, beyond its intended use of providing near-instant transport between specific locations on the Earth in the present.

== Plot summary ==
On a future Earth (c. 2080 CE) overwhelmed with severe difficulties related to overpopulation, a portal is discovered that leads to a parallel world. Jim Briskin, campaigning to be the first Black president of the United States, believes that the new "alter-Earth" could be colonized and become a home for the seventy million people that are being kept in cryopreservation. Known as bibs, these are people - mostly non-caucasians - who decided to be "put to sleep" until a time when the overpopulation problem is solved.

Briskin is a social conservative, who does not support the Golden Doors of Bliss orbital brothel, and opposes widespread abortion access. There are two dominant US political parties, the "Republican Liberals" and the "States Rights Conservative Democrats" who run CLEAN, a racist frontgroup that opposes Briskin's candidacy, although higher-income white American voters support him. Terraforming becomes a pivotal election issue, until a warp drive malfunction in a "'scuttler" tube results in the discovery of an apparently uninhabited alternate world, an 'alter-Earth' where Homo sapiens either never evolved or lost in competition with other early hominids. In this case, the point of divergence appears to have occurred between one and two million years ago, as Homo erectus, also known as Sinanthropus, Pithecanthropus or Peking Man, is the dominant species. In reference to the latter designation, the explorers refer to the indigenous hominids of this world as "Pekes."

There is a hasty initial colonization attempt. The minimum time period necessary for all of the tens of millions of "bibs" to emigrate is estimated to be twenty years. In order to cut this down to 5 years the rift is temporarily closed so a new power supply can be installed which will theoretically quadruple the width of the rift. When this action is completed, however, it is discovered that one hundred years has elapsed in the parallel world. During this time the conjoined twin businessman George Walt, who had run the Golden Doors of Bliss satellite brothel, had emigrated into the parallel world during initial colonization and set himself up as a "wind god". He spent those hundred years teaching and filling in technological gaps in the Peke's world as well as learning many new ideas from them. He also apparently assisted in sabotaging the colonization effort, as it would not exactly be in his own best interest were word to leak out that he was merely a mutated Homo sapiens.

After all the decades-consuming preparations have been completed, however, George Walt eventually sets a trap so that whenever the rift eventually re-opens, the "Pekes" can power it from their side and keep it from closing.

This procedure allows the Pekes to begin an invasion of Earth, but they abruptly depart en masse when it is finally revealed, as George Walt originally feared, that their wind god is actually just a wind bag; that is to say, he's just another lying, deceiving, untrustworthy member of the species Homo sapiens. The colonization attempt from Earth is thereby aborted, and Briskin, being newly elected, is left at the story's end to deal with the consequences during his next two presidential terms.

== Sources ==
- Rossi, Umberto. "Postfazione", in Philip K. Dick, Svegliatevi, dormienti, Roma: Fanucci, 2002, pp. 239–247.
- Butler, Andrew M. (2001). Philip K. Dick. Pocket Essentials. ISBN 978-1-903-04729-3.
- Mackey, Douglas A (1988). Philip K. Dick. Boston: Twayne. ISBN 0805775153.

== See also ==
- 1966 in literature
