= Patricia S. Warrick =

American academic

- Patricia Scott McArt (later Warrick), from a 1946 publication
- Born: Patricia DeEtte Scott; February 6, 1925; LaGrange, Indiana, U.S.
- Died: February 23, 2023 (age 98); Green Bay, Wisconsin, U.S.
- Other name: Patricia McArt
- Occupations: College professor, literary scholar, editor

Patricia DeEtte Scott Warrick (February 6, 1925 – February 23, 2023) was an American literary scholar and editor, interested in science fiction and technology. She was a professor of English at the University of Wisconsin–Oskosh, Fox Cities, from 1966 to 1996. She was president of the Science Fiction Research Association in the 1980s. She co-edited Machines That Think (1984) with Isaac Asimov and Martin H. Greenberg.

== Early life and education ==
Scott was born in LaGrange, Indiana, the daughter of Ross Scott and DeEtte Ulman Scott. She graduated from LaGrange High School in 1943. She earned a bachelor's degree in biochemistry from Indiana University Bloomington, and a second bachelor's degree in English at Goshen College. She earned a master's degree in English at Purdue University. She completed doctoral studies in 1977 at the University of Wisconsin–Milwaukee, with a dissertation titled "The Cybernetic Imagination in Science Fiction".

== Career ==
Warrick taught at Lawrence University from 1965 to 1966. She was a professor of English at the University of Wisconsin–Oskosh, Fox Cities campus, from 1966 to 1986. She was president of the Science Fiction Research Association (SFRA) from 1983 to 1984. "If fiction is to survive, it has no choice but to write about science and technology," she said in a 1986 interview. "And fiction will survive because inventing stories is a vital part of being human." In 2004 she received the Thomas D. Clareson Award for Distinguished Service from the SFRA. There is a Patricia A. Warrick Scholarship, named for her in 2006.

== Publications ==
=== As author ===
In addition to her scholarship, Warrick wrote a self-published historical novel, Charles Babbage and the Countess (2007).

- "The Circuitous Journey of Consciousness in Barth’s Chimera" (1976)
- "Ethical Evolving Artificial Intelligence" (1977)
- "The Labyrinthian Process of the Artificial: Dick's Androids and Mechanical Constructs" (1979)
- The Cybernetic Imagination in Science Fiction (1980, based on her dissertation)
- "The Encounter of Taoism and Fascism in The Man in the High Castle" (1980)
- "The Contrapuntal Design of Artificial Evolution in Asimov’s "The Bicentennial Man"" (1981)
- "Now We Are Fifteen: Observations on the Science Fiction Research Association by Its President" (1984)
- "Power Struggles and the Man in the High Castle" (1987)
- Mind in motion: The fiction of Philip K. Dick (1987)
- "Asimov and the Morality of Artificial Intelligence" (2002)

=== As editor ===
- American Government Through Science Fiction (1974, edited with Martin H. Greenberg and Joseph Olander)
- Anthropology Through Science Fiction (1974, edited with Martin H. Greenberg and Carol Mason)
- Introductory Psychology Through Science Fiction (1974, edited with Martin H. Greenberg and Harvey Katz)
- Political Science Fiction: An Introductory Reader (1974, edited with Martin H. Greenberg)
- School and Society Through Science Fiction (1974, edited with Martin H. Greenberg and Joseph Olander)
- Sociology Through Science Fiction (1974, edited with Martin H. Greenberg, Joseph Olander, and John W. Milstead)
- Social Problems Through Science Fiction (1975, edited with Martin H. Greenberg, Joseph Olander, and John W. Milstead)
- The New Awareness: Religion Through Science Fiction (1975, edited with Martin H. Greenberg)
- Marriage and Family Through Science Fiction (1976, with Martin H. Greenberg, Joseph Olander, and Val Clear)
- Run to Starlight: Sports through Science Fiction (1976, with Martin H. Greenberg and Joseph Olander)
- Science Fiction: Contemporary Mythology (1978, edited with Martin H. Greenberg and Joseph Olander)
- Robots, Androids, and Mechanical Oddities: The Science Fiction of Philip K. Dick (1984, edited with Martin H. Greenberg)
- Machines that Think: The Best Science Fiction About Robots and Computers (1984, 1991, edited with Isaac Asimov and M. H. Greenberg)

== Personal life ==
Scott married her first husband, physician Bruce A. McArt, in 1946; they had three children, and divorced. She married James E. Warrick in 1965; they divorced in 1972, remarried in 1973, and divorced again in 1977. She was badly injured in a fall in 2000. She died in Green Bay, Wisconsin in 2023, at the age of 98. (Her older brother, paleobotanist Richard A. Scott (1921–2024), survived her and lived to be 102.)
