= The Story to End All Stories for Harlan Ellison's Anthology Dangerous Visions =

- Short story by Philip K. Dick
- Language: English
- Genre(s): science fiction, horror, post-apocalyptic, dystopian, flash fiction

Publication
- Published in: Niekas
- Publication type: science fiction fanzine
- Publisher: Ed Meskys
- Publication date: 1968

"The Story to End All Stories for Harlan Ellison's Anthology Dangerous Visions" (1968) is a 117-word short story by Philip K. Dick, written as an addendum, or spiritual sequel to "Faith of Our Fathers". It is a simply written account of a decadent, dystopian, post-apocalyptic society, characterised by inter-species sex, infanticide, and cannibalism. The story is symbolic and satirical, reflecting ideas of divinity and the consequences of war, themes which figure large in the author's writing.

It was first published in the science-fiction fanzine Niekas, before finding its way into Dick's own The Eye of the Sibyl. The latter portion of the story's title refers to the sci-fi anthology Dangerous Visions (1967), edited by Harlan Ellison, in which "Faith of Our Fathers" first appeared. Dangerous Visions has been credited as a milestone of sex and sexuality in speculative fiction; sex is a major motif in "Stories", especially the non-mainstream varieties.
