= In Milton Lumky Territory =

Novel by Philip K. Dick

- Dust-jacket from the first trade edition
- Author: Philip K. Dick
- Cover artist: Barclay Shaw
- Language: English
- Genre: Novel
- Publisher: Dragon Press
- Publication date: 1985
- Publication place: United States
- Media type: Print (Hardback)
- Pages: 213
- ISBN: 0-911499-09-1
- OCLC: 12195177

In Milton Lumky Territory is a realist, non-science fiction novel authored by Philip K. Dick. Originally written in 1958, but rejected by prospective publishers, this book was eventually published posthumously in 1985 by Dragon Press. It was published in two editions. Fifty copies were bound in quarter leather and included a signature from one of the author's canceled checks but were not jacketed. Nine hundred fifty copies were published with a cloth binding and included a dust jacket. It was reprinted in paperback in 2006.

== Plot ==
In 1958, 24-year-old Bruce "Skip" Stevens is a buyer for a national warehouse chain. He passes through his hometown of Montario, Idaho whilst en route to Boise on business. He visits a one-time girlfriend, Peg Googer, and meets a strangely-familiar 34-year-old woman named Susan Faine, who has just divorced her husband. He realises he remembers her as Miss Reuben, his loathed fifth-grade teacher back in 1944.

Bruce quits his job and moves from Reno, Nevada to live with Susan in Boise. Within a few days, they are sleeping together and get married in a trip to Reno. Susan brings him on as a business partner of her typewriter shop.

The disillusioned but experienced travelling paper salesman Milton Lumky informs Bruce about a new Japanese electric typewriter model. He and Milton drive up to Seattle to buy some, but a flare-up of Milton's nephritis means Bruce has to leave him near the Washington-Oregon border. Milton asks Bruce if he's an atheist: Bruce laughs hysterically.

Returning to Boise with the typewriters, Susan points out they are Spanish language keyboards and are unusuable for American typists. Bruce plans to offload the unsellable typewriters to his former warehouse employer, which Susan opposes. Susan informs the warehouse of Bruce's intentions behind his back, and they offer to buy the typewriters at a fair but unprofitable price. Bruce decides to try altering all the machines himself and sell them at the shop. Returning to Boise, he informs Susan of his decision and sets to work, only to return the next morning to find that Susan has fired him and is selling all the typewriters to the warehouse chain.

Distraught, Bruce rents a room and daydreams about being in fifth grade again, where he writes Susan an essay about a future where they successfully sell the Japanese typewriters and they open up a store in Montario. Suddenly, Bruce and Susan make up, are able to sell the typewriters, open up shop in Montario, ultimately move to Denver following a purchase of an expanded facility, hear of Milton's death from nephritis, and live happily ever after. As the ending follows on immediately from the daydream without explanation, it is unclear if this happened in real life or is a continuation of Bruce's dream.

== Sources ==
- Brown, Charles N.; William G. Contento. "The Locus Index to Science Fiction (1984–1998)".
- Andrew Butler: The Pocket Essential Philip K. Dick: Harpenden: Pocket Essentials: 2007: ISBN 1-904048-92-7
- Chalker, Jack L.; Mark Owings (1998). The Science-Fantasy Publishers: A Bibliographic History, 1923-1998. Westminster, MD and Baltimore: Mirage Press, Ltd. p. 201.
