= A World of Talent =

- Short story by Philip K. Dick
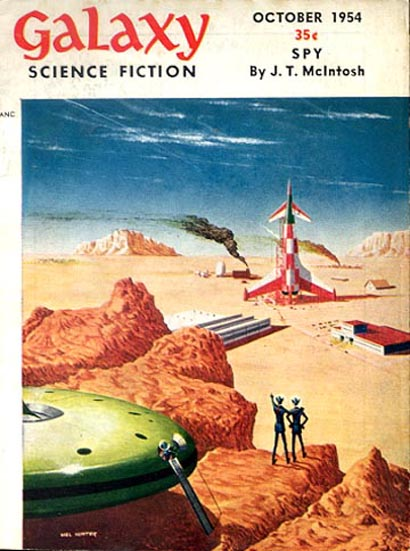
- Genre(s): Science fiction

Publication
- Published in: Galaxy Science Fiction
- Publication date: October 1954

"A World of Talent" is a science fiction short story by American writer Philip K. Dick, first published in Galaxy Science Fiction magazine (October 1954).

== Plot summary ==
The story is set on a separatist Earth colony where the society is becoming dominated by mutants with psionic abilities. The colony is protected from Earth by an enormously powerful but infantile mutant called Big Noodle. The central character is a precog, Curtis or Curt, who uncovers the existence of 'anti-psi's' - humans with the ability to cancel out or nullify the powers of the psionic mutants.

He attempts to get the non-psychic or 'Norm'-led government to officially recognize the anti-psi's, knowing that this could balance out the corrupting power that the psi's would soon possess over the rest of humanity. He is thwarted, however, by the powerful psi Corps of mutants, who murder his anti-psi lover, Patricia Ann Connley or Pat.

Curt has a young son, Tim, who, though seemingly a somewhat autistic, untalented 'norm', is actually the ultimate precog. This is due to both his ability to travel in time and his power to change the course of events as well. In the end, an older Tim appears to his father from the future, telling him that he was right about the need to balance the power of the psi's. His compassion for his father in the wake of Curt's recent loss compels him to alter the timeline in a very specific way.

== Notes ==
- Dick very much disliked the insistence of people like John W. Campbell, that stories should positively portray psionics (beings with extrasensory powers as telepathy, telekinesis and precognition). This story was one of his replies, showing the price of these talents, and the distorted personalities that could result - chiefly through the perspective of a withdrawn little boy.
- The character of Tim is a precursor to Manfred Steiner, a character in Dicks's 1964 novel, Martian Time-Slip. It is one of four of his short stories to be expanded into a novel.
- Philip K. Dick's 1969 novel Ubik contained characters who were anti-psis, one of whom shares the name Patricia Conley.
