= Autofac =

1955 science fiction short story by Philip K. Dick

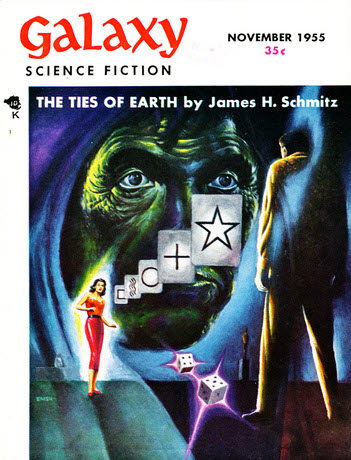
- "Autofac" was originally published in the November 1955 issue of Galaxy Science Fiction (not to be confused with cover featuring author James H. Schmitz).
- Author: Philip K. Dick
- Genre: Science fiction
- Published in: Galaxy Science Fiction
- Publication date: November 1955

"Autofac" is a 1955 science fiction novelette by American writer Philip K. Dick that features one of the earliest treatments of self-replicating machines (and Dick's second, after his 1953 novelette Second Variety). It originally appeared in the November 1955 issue of Galaxy Science Fiction, and was reprinted in several collections, including The Variable Man published in 1957, and Robots, Androids, and Mechanical Oddities published in 1984.

It was adapted by Travis Beacham for an episode of the 2017 TV series, Philip K. Dick's Electric Dreams, with the same name as the short story.

== Plot ==
Three men wait outside their settlement for an automated delivery truck. Five years earlier, during the Total Global Conflict, a network of hardened automatic factories ("autofacs") had been set up with cybernetic controls that determine what food and consumer goods to manufacture and deliver. Human input had been lost, and the men planned disruption to try to establish communication and take over control. They destroy the delivery, but the truck radios the autofac and unloads an identical replacement, then prevents them from reloading items. They act out being disgusted with the milk delivery and are given a complaints checklist. In a blank space, they write improvised semantic garble—"the product is thoroughly pizzled".

The autofac sends a humanoid data collector that communicates on an oral basis but is not capable of conceptual thought, and they are unable to persuade the network to shut down before it consumes all resources.

Their next strategy sets neighbouring autofacs in competition with each other for rare resources and succeeds in creating military conflict between the autofacs. After the autofac conflict seems to be resolved, the men explore the ruins of a destroyed autofac to see if there are any industrial machines that can be salvaged. They locate a hidden level. Inside they find that the factory is self-replicated, and sending out "metal seeds" configured to make miniature autofacs.

== Reception ==
The novelette was said to "poignantly captured the concern of its moment" and to "portray a future of vast warehouses and automated delivery of goods, a system which is eerily recognizable to this day".

== Translations ==
- French: "Le Règne des robots", anonymous, August 1956, in "Galaxie Anticipation" issue 33

== Television version ==
The TV series Philip K. Dick's Electric Dreams includes a one-hour episode based on the story, with considerable differences in the plot and outcome.
