= The Father-thing =

1954 science fiction short story by Philip K. Dick

"The Father-Thing" is a 1954 science fiction short story by American writer Philip K. Dick. It first appeared in the December 1954 issue of The Magazine of Fantasy & Science Fiction. The story focuses on a child's realization that his father has been replaced by something inhuman. The story is typical of Dick's short fiction of the period.

== Synopsis ==
8-year old Charles Walton is stunned to find two versions of his father conversing in the garage. To his horror, the one that is not his father sits down to dinner. In the garage, he finds the desiccated remains of his father.

Charles enlists the neighborhood bully and another child for help. They realize that the father-thing acts like an automaton and must be controlled by something. The kids find a foot-long burrowing creature of some kind. As they try to destroy it, the father-thing grabs Charles.

During the climactic struggle, Charles gets free and hides in a cluster of bamboo. He finds a pod growing a version of his mother and another growing his replacement. The father-thing recaptures Charles and stirs Charles' duplicate. As the father-thing prepares to feed Charles to his duplicate, both replicas collapse. Charles is relieved to learn that while he was hiding, the other kids poured kerosene down the creature's burrow and set it on fire. When the creature died, so did its creations.

== Background ==
The story comes from a kernel of Philip K. Dick's childhood memories. He recalled:

"I always had the impression, when I was very small, that my father was two people, one good, one bad. The good father goes away and the bad father replaces him. I guess many kids have this feeling. What if it were so? This story is another instance of a normal feeling, which is in fact incorrect, somehow becoming correct ... with the added misery that one cannot communicate it to others. Fortunately, there are other kids to tell it to. Kids understand: they are wiser than adults - hmmm, I almost said, 'Wiser than humans.'"

In early September 1953, Dick reworked the ending of the story with the editors of The Magazine of Fantasy & Science Fiction, Anthony Boucher and J. Francis McComas. They felt it ended too abruptly, and Dick decided to have the other children return to save Charles.

The premise was widely used in fiction of the time. Works like Invasion of the Body Snatchers, especially popular in the 1950s, expressed the fear that people are not what they seem to be. Dick's story is typically more personal because it is not about the invasion of a community, but of a family. The second installment of Jack Finney's The Body Snatchers was serialized in Collier's the same month that Dick's story appeared.

The Father-Thing is the U.S. Underwood-Miller (1987) and UK title of the third collected volume of Dick's short stories, retitled Second Variety after "Second Variety" was moved from Volume 2 by Citadel.

== Adaptations ==
In 2017, writer-director Michael Dinner adapted the story as an episode of the TV series Philip K. Dick's Electric Dreams, starring Greg Kinnear as the Father.

== See also ==
- Capgras delusion
- "Folie à Deux" (The X-Files)
- The Hanging Stranger
- Human disguise
- "The New Mother"
