= Martian Time-Slip =

1964 science fiction novel by Philip K. Dick

Martian Time Slip
- Cover of first edition (paperback)
- Author: Philip K. Dick
- Language: English
- Genre: Science fiction Philosophical fiction
- Publisher: Ballantine Books
- Publication date: 1964
- Publication place: United States
- Media type: Print (Hardcover & Paperback)
- Pages: 220

Martian Time-Slip is a 1964 science fiction novel by American writer Philip K. Dick, set in a colony on Mars, with themes of mental illness, the physics of time, and the dangers of centralized authority.

The novel was first published under the title All We Marsmen, serialized in the August, October and December 1963 issues of Worlds of Tomorrow magazine. The subsequent 1964 publication as Martian Time-Slip is virtually identical, with different chapter breaks.

== Plot summary ==
Jack Bohlen is a repairman who emigrated to Mars to flee from his bouts of schizophrenia. He lives with a wife and a young son, and lives on the frontier edge of one of the settlements. Mars is a struggling colony, where conflicts from the overpopulated Earth (largely based in Cold War-era relationships) are loosely projected onto the planet. In order to encourage investment and migration from Earth, however, the colony's biggest problems are kept secret. One of these problems is that space travel causes genetic mutations and "abnormal births."

Bohlen has a chance encounter with Arnie Kott, the hard-nosed leader of the Water Workers' Union, when both Bohlen's and Kott's 'copters are called to assist a group of critically dehydrated Bleekmen, the original inhabitants of Mars who are thought to be genetically similar to the Khoekhoe of Earth. Bohlen rebukes Kott for his hesitance to help the Bleekmen, an act that angers Kott. For his help, the Bleekmen give Bohlen a sacred "water witch" that they say will protect him.

After visiting with his ex-wife, Anne Esterhazy, about their own "anomalous" child, Kott hears of the theories of Dr. Milton Glaub, a psychotherapist at Camp Ben-Gurion, an institution for those afflicted with pervasive developmental disorders. Glaub believes that mental illnesses may be altered states of time perception. Kott becomes interested in Manfred Steiner, an autistic boy at Camp B-G in the hopes that the boy can predict the future—a skill Kott would find useful to his business ventures. Manfred's father, Norbert Steiner, was a popular importer of contraband luxury items who just committed suicide. Kott then makes a move to take over the business, unbeknownst to Norbert's assistant, Otto Zitte.

Kott then asks Dr. Glaub to lend him Manfred (now fatherless) so that he can build a machine that will slow down his interactions with people and allow Manfred to communicate with them (and thus, for Kott to also know the future). For this task, Kott leases (and eventually buys out) Bohlen's contract from his current employer so that he can work on building the device full-time. Bohlen takes a liking to Manfred but the assignment stresses him out because he fears that contact with the mentally ill may cause him to relapse. Bohlen also begins an affair with Kott's mistress, Doreen Anderton.

The narrative turns to the perspective of Manfred, who is afraid of a future only he can see, in which he is a decrepit old man, confined to a bed on life-support, living in a derelict medical compound called AM-WEB, a dumping ground for forgotten people like him. We later learn that he is obsessed with this vision and thus cannot focus on the present.

Meanwhile, Bohlen's father, Leo—a wealthy land speculator from Earth—arrives to stake a claim to the seemingly worthless Franklin D. Roosevelt mountain range after receiving an insider tip that the United Nations plans to build a huge apartment complex there. Kott learns that a speculator with a fake name has arrived and becomes obsessed with figuring out where they are buying land so that he can buy it first (Manfred's prognostications become the main mechanism for this task).

On the trip out to the range with his father, Bohlen brings along Manfred, who draws a picture while they stake their claim to the land. The drawing shows the forthcoming apartment complexes, but in a dilapidated state, far in the future. Bohlen realizes that Manfred can indeed predict the future and connects the name "AM-WEB" on the building to how co-op apartment complexes are named on Earth.

On an earlier repair assignment, Bohlen was sent to service the simulacra at the Public School, where lessons are taught by robotic simulations of historical figures. These figures are deeply disturbing to Bohlen as they remind him of his own schizoid episodes where he perceived people around him as non-living robots. When he takes Manfred to the school during an assignment, the simulacra begin acting strangely, as it seems Manfred is altering their functionality. Bohlen is asked to take Manfred away, but then has a psychotic break, seeing the world from Manfred's perspective and subsequently suffering a debilitating panic attack. Dr. Glaub arrives to escort them both out and warns Bohlen to avoid Manfred because he will cause him to revert into permanent psychosis.

The narrative then turns to the crux of the story—a meeting between Kott, Bohlen and Kott's mistress, Doreen, at Kott's home, with Manfred in tow. Bohlen shows Kott the future drawing by Manfred and explains that his father was the speculator from Earth, who has already registered his purchase of the entire FDR Range. Until this meeting, he had no idea what Kott was up to, and he apologizes for the misunderstanding. The episode is actually previewed three times, in successive chapters, from each character's perspective (though partly through Manfred's eyes—and possibly Bohlen's), before it actually occurs in the narrative's real timeline. In each repetition, however, the events are more surreal and the perceptions more hallucinatory. When the events of the story finally reach the crucial point where Bohlen explains the bad news (something he intensely fears after having foreseen a deadly outcome), he himself does not experience it (or at least, he cannot remember it later). Bohlen's awareness stops as he and Doreen arrive at Kott's home and picks up after they leave. He only knows that he and Kott parted ways, superficially friends (with Kott forgiving him) but actually enemies.

During the repetition of this episode, it becomes clear that Heliogabalus, Kott's Bleekman servant, is easily able to communicate with Manfred (mostly through telepathy). Heliogabalus explains that, from Manfred's point of view, (Earth) humans are strange beings who live in a world of fractured time where they disappear from one place and reappear in another and otherwise move in a jerky, uncoordinated manner. Heliogabalus, to Manfred, moves smoothly and gracefully (we later learn that all Bleekmen are like this to Manfred).

Pressured by Kott, Heliogabalus reveals that the Bleekmen's sacred rock, "Dirty Knobby", could possibly be used as a time travel portal that Manfred may be able to open. Kott centers his interest in altering the past on two goals: revenge on Bohlen and claiming the FDR mountains before his father, Leo, does. Heliogabalus warns Kott that it would be dangerous to attack Bohlen because he possesses a "water-witch". (Interestingly, in the latter half of the story, Dr. Glaub increasingly attempts to intervene on Bohlen's behalf, and it is unclear if this is something to do with the water-witch, Manfred's manipulation of time, or if Dr. Glaub is descending into his own psychotic break). Heliogabalus also explains that Manfred will only help him if Kott promises to send him back to Earth, changing the future so he never ends up in the horrifying AM-WEB building.

Kott takes Manfred on the pilgrimage to "Dirty Knobby" and is transported back in time, to the point where he first appeared in the novel (emerging from a sybaritic bath-house run by the Union). He soon finds himself repeating the actions that led him to meet Bohlen while simultaneously dealing with perceptual distortions (essentially Manfred's cold, dark perception of reality). He is unable to get to the FDR mountains to plant his stake, being compelled by law to go to the aid of the dehydrated Bleekmen, just as he did before. There he again encounters Bohlen, as he did originally, but in attempting to shoot him, Kott is first struck by a Bleekman's poisoned arrow. In his pain and anguish, he wishes only to return to his original timeline and vows to give up his revenge.

Kott awakens back at Dirty Knobby and realizes he has failed to change the past. Thankful to be back home, he decides to give up on his schemes, abandon Doreen, and let Bohlen get on with his life. He still desires to help Manfred, but Manfred has wandered off during the purported "time-travel" episode (i.e., nothing that Kott did in the "past" appears to affect the current timeline).

Leaving Dirty Knobby, Kott waves to a 'copter overhead, thinking it is Bohlen and Doreen. Instead it is Otto Zitte, whose business he had earlier bombed. After the suicide of Norbert Steiner, Kott, his best customer, elected to take over Norbert's contraband business. Zitte, Norbert's assistant, beat him to the punch, so Kott's men destroyed the smuggler's storage facility and the adjacent property, leaving a message that "Arnie Kott doesn't like what you stand for". Zitte then shoots Kott, who believes he is in another of Manfred's distorted realities. Bohlen and Doreen land in Kott's own 'copter and take Kott back to Lewistown. Kott dies en route, believing to the last that he was only experiencing another hallucination. Meanwhile, Manfred has fallen in with a group of Bleekmen leaving the FDR Mountains in the wake of the UN's commencing construction.

Bohlen returns to his wife, Silvia, who had been seduced by Zitte on his sales round. Despite both admitting to infidelity (Jack with Doreen and Silvia with Zitte), they decide to maintain their marriage. Next door at the Steiner's, there is a disturbance, and Norbert's widow runs screaming into the night. Barging in, Bohlen and Silvia see a decrepit old man in a wheelchair, festooned with tubes, accompanied by Bleekmen. Bohlen realizes it is the future Manfred. He had saved himself from AM-WEB and has now come back through time to see his family and thank Bohlen.

In a subdued final scene, Bohlen and his father are out searching for Steiner's widow in the darkness, with voices "business-like and competent and patient", apparently intent on helping Manfred say goodbye to his mother.

== Critical reception ==
Critical reception of Martian Time-Slip has been mostly positive, with critics praising the novel for its handling of historical erasure, colonialism, immigration, and mental illness. Susan Weeber argues that the colonization of the Bleekmen of Mars is a metaphor for the Western colonization of indigenous peoples. The efforts of the Public School to maintain a "correct" version of history, justified in the novel by a desire to prevent mental illness, are seen by Weeber as efforts to erase marginalized perspectives. Martian Time-Slip's "near-future" setting, culturally similar to 1960s America, reinforces its position as a contemporary critique. Elena Corioni argues that Martian Time-Slip was ahead of its time in terms of its handling of climate change. She notes that the possibility of humans escaping the consequences of climate change by colonizing Mars is becoming more of a possibility than science fiction, and that the novel is an effective criticism of that idea. Colonists displace the Bleekmen, who were able to live sustainably on Mars indefinitely, in favor of creating a broken capitalist dystopia that is destined to destroy the climate of Mars the same way it destroyed the climate of Earth.

== Proposed film adaptations ==
Brian Aldiss tried to convince Stanley Kubrick to make a film based on the novel but Kubrick was not interested, recalling "Stanley simply swept my suggestion out of the way. No discussion. No time to be wasted."

In 2013, writer-director Dee Rees planned to create a film adaptation of Martian Time-Slip. Although ultimately she did not complete the film, her efforts introduced her to Isa Dick Hackett, Dick's daughter, and led to the creation of the anthology television series Electric Dreams, which is based on Dick's work.

== Audiobooks ==
- A Martian Time-Slip audiobook — read by Grover Gardner (possibly under his alias Tom Parker), unabridged, approximately 9 hours over 6 audio cassettes — was released in 1998.
- A second unabridged audiobook version of Martian Time-Slip was released in 2007. Also read by Grover Gardner, it runs approximately 9.5 hours over 8 CDs. It was released under the title Martian Time-Slip and The Golden Man, and also includes a reading of Dick's short story "The Golden Man."

== See also ==
- United Nations in popular culture
