= Now Wait for Last Year =

1966 novel by Philip K. Dick

- Cover of first edition (hardcover)
- Author: Philip K. Dick
- Language: English
- Genre: Science fiction
- Publisher: Doubleday
- Publication date: 1966
- Publication place: United States
- Media type: Print (hardback & paperback)
- Pages: 214

Now Wait for Last Year is a 1966 science fiction novel by American writer Philip K. Dick. It is set in 2055, when Earth is caught between two galactic powers in an interstellar conflict, Dr. Eric Sweetscent and his wife Kathy get addicted to a powerful drug that appears to cause time travel. The doctor's patient is the world leader, UN Secretary General. Of the twenty-eight novels Dick published in the 1960s and 1970s, this novel is one of the five chosen to represent this period of his career in The Library of America series, Volume Two.

== Plot summary ==
Set during a war between the 'Starmen (inhabitants of the planet Lilistar) and six-limbed insectoid creatures called the reegs, Now Wait for Last Year is the story of Eric Sweetscent, an organ-transplant doctor who gets wrapped up in Earth-Lilistar politics. At the onset of the story, Sweetscent is the personal org-trans surgeon for Virgil Ackerman, the president of Tijuana Fur & Dye. Using an extraterrestrial amoeba which can imitate the cell-structure of anything it touches, TF&D had been the largest manufacturer of synthetic furs on the planet. But like all major corporations on Earth, TF&D has been requisitioned to produce for the war effort.

Ackerman invites Sweetscent to "Wash-35", a recreation of his boyhood native Washington DC in a simulated 1935 and his vacation getaway on Mars, where he announces an ulterior motive in the retreat. Waiting for them when they arrive is a guest—Gino Molinari, the elected leader of Earth. Known as "the Mole", he is rumored to have the enigmatic ability to come back from the dead, and he has requested the services of Sweetscent. Ackerman gladly passes Sweetscent on to Molinari.

Meanwhile, Sweetscent's wife, Kathy, tries JJ-180, a new hallucinogenic drug which proves to be highly toxic and addictive. The effects of JJ-180 are not clear at first, however, only hours off of it, Kathy finds herself unable to function and violently craving JJ-180 again. She is visited by 'Starmen who claim the reegs invented JJ-180 as a chemical weapon against the 'Starmen and Terrans, also stating that there is no known cure for the drug's addiction and 'That's why we put you on it'. Kathy is now a slave to JJ-180.

The 'Starmen inform Kathy of her husband's new position with Molinari and suspect the latter's possible defection to the reegs. Kathy is promised more JJ-180 if she agrees to spy on her husband for Lilistar. Threatened with deportation, Kathy capitulates and agrees to their terms. Eventually, she takes a second dose of the drug as her ability to function becomes nearly impossible due to the effects of the withdrawal. Jumping into a taxi-cab, both she and the cab are plunged back in time to the 1930s. As the effects of the drug wear off, they slowly make their way back to the present time, uncertain as to whether the past they visited was their own or an alternate one.

An increasingly paranoid Kathy sets off to visit her husband. Under his new employer Eric Sweetscent is let in on certain State secrets: Molinari seems to have a psychosomatic condition that mirrors any illness or disease of anyone in his vicinity. The effects of this condition appear to be real, yet the Mole pulls through every time, always returning from the brink of death.

Molinari, like everyone else, has realized that in siding with the 'Starmen Earth has doomed itself to the wrong side of a losing war. However, there does not seem to be any safe way of defecting to the reegs, and Molinari fears that his deteriorating health will not instill confidence in the Terrans should the 'Starmen retaliate, as they are certain to do. Sweetscent is shown footage of a healthier, younger Molinari in uniform and is led to believe that an android look-alike of the President has been created for public appearances, a notion that does not account for the fact that there is at least one other Molinari on the premises, a bullet-ridden corpse that is being preserved for use in the event of certain possible future developments.

Kathy arrives to inform her husband of her addiction, and in an effort to motivate him to find a cure she slips a pill of JJ-180 into his drink. Without enough time to be furious, Eric slips a year into the future of an alternate world where his colleagues inform him that he disappeared the day Kathy came to visit. Sweetscent also witnesses that in the new timeline Earth has sided with the reegs and Lilistar has lost the war.

Upon returning to the present of his own timeline, Sweetscent is eager to present this information to Molinari, who reveals that he too has been taking JJ-180, and that the effect is different for each user. Certain users are sent to the past, while others are sent to the future. Each trip is in an alternate universe, and therefore no one can effectively change their own past or future. However, aside from minor details, events in all observed universes seem to be moving in the same direction, and therefore, information obtained from one alternate world's future will most likely be applicable to another.

In Molinari's case he slips sideways in time under the drug's influence and is able to pull alternate versions of his present self into his own timeline and then keep them there. Having learned the secret to Molinari's alter-aliases as well as confirming the feasibility of an alliance with the reegs, Eric takes a larger dose of JJ-180 which propels him further into the future. While there, he obtains a cure for JJ-180's addiction, an item of wide accessibility in the future, as well as obtaining more information about the possible future of the war in his own timeline. He also gathers information as to the effects of JJ-180 on the brain as he is increasingly worried about Kathy's mental condition. Taking a fraction of a pill so as to not immediately return to his own time, Eric again ends up one year in his own future where the 'Starmen have occupied Earth after learning of the Terrans' defection to the reegs. He is arrested by a 'Star patrol but saved by his future self, who informs him that Ackerman and the rest of the crew at TF&D have taken a stand against Lilistar, using Ackerman's getaway on Mars as their hideout.

Now knowing the general future history of the next few years, Eric returns to his own time where his wife's mental condition is deteriorating every day. He resolves to check her into a clinic and is sent into deep reflection about the nature of their relationship. Feeling that he would be justified, he attempts to arrange an affair with a younger girl at Molinari's recommendation. However, he backs out of it and begins to slip into a deep depression while reflecting on his life. He goes to Mexico to purchase poison with which to commit suicide. Deciding against it at the last second, Eric watches as the 'Starmen begin their invasion of Earth.

Deciding that he is destined to join Ackerman's resistance against the 'Starmen, Eric enters an automated cab bound for TF&D, asking it what it would do if its wife suffered from brain-damage without possibility of recovery (which Eric had confirmed by contacting his future self). After pointing out that robots do not marry, the cab hypothetically concludes that it would stay with her. Life, argues the cab, is made up of a series of circumstances, different for each person. To leave one's wife would be to say that he requires a uniquely easier set of circumstances than what has been provided. That reasoning, to the cab, was an irrational way of thinking. Eric agrees and decides to stay with his wife despite the challenges presented by her condition, and in the closing paragraph is commended by the cab for being a 'good man'.

== Interpretations ==
Now Wait for Last Year deliberately breaks with the traditional conventions of science fiction, which primarily demand scientific plausibility. Instead, the temporal paradoxes and parallel universes that appear in the plot serve as metaphors to depict cultural division and existential moral questions. As in many of his other works, his characters inevitably find themselves in situations where the line between objective reality, drug-induced hallucinations, and artificial simulations becomes completely blurred. In Now Wait For Last Year it’s the drug JJ-180. Even a single dose leads to a fatal addiction and forces users into uncontrolled time travel. The drug affects the characters differently: While Kathy Sweetscent travels into the past, her husband Eric moves into the future, and Molinari travels laterally into alternative versions of the present to forge alliances with his own parallel selves. Dick uses these disorienting effects to explore the nature of human ethics. In a world that is full of cynical, lonely people under constant oppression, moral behavior is often determined by what one consciously chooses not to do. Moreover the use of JJ-180 causes permanent brain damage in Kathy, Which causes Eric to think how to handle the responsibility of his sick wife.

== Bibliography ==
- Dick, Philip K. (2008). Five novels of the 1960s & 70s. New York: Library of America. ISBN 978-1-59853-025-4.
- Umland, Samuel J., ed. (1995). Philip K. Dick: Contemporary Critical Interpretations. Westport: Greenwood Press. ISBN 0-313-29295-7.
- Link, Eric Carl, ed. (2010). Understanding Philip K. Dick. Columbia: University of South Carolina Press. ISBN 978-1-570-03855-6.
- Robinson, Kim Stanley (1984). The Novels of Philip K. Dick. Ann Harbor: UMI Rerearch Press. ISBN 0-8357-1589-2.
