= The War with the Fnools =

1969 short story by American writer Philip K. Dick

"The War with the Fnools" is a science fiction short story by American writer Philip K. Dick. It was first published in Galaxy magazine in 1969.

The Fnools are invaders who appear to be two-foot-tall human beings. They take on the guise of Volkswagen mechanics, ethnic circus performers, and similar roles, unaware that they stand out for being unusually short. Then a Fnool discovers that if one of their kind partakes in an activity associated with "vice" (initially tobacco, and then, separately, alcohol), all Fnools gain two feet in height. When they do these the Fnools become indistinguishable from human beings, albeit temporarily, before one engages in sex and they all become inhumanly tall.

Dick said of the story:

Well, once again we are invaded. And, humiliatingly, by a lifeform which is absurd. My colleague Tim Powers once said that Martians could invade us simply by putting on funny hats, and we'd never notice. It's a sort of low-budget invasion. I guess we're at the point where we can be amused by the idea of Earth being invaded. (And this is when they really zap you.)
