= Not by Its Cover =

Short story by American writer Philip K. Dick

"Not by Its Cover" is a science fiction short story by American writer Philip K. Dick, a "loose sequel" to his first published science fiction short story, "Beyond Lies the Wub". The story continues the former's theme of immortality, although not focusing on a living Wub itself, but rather its fur.

== Plot ==
Wub fur, so the story suggests, continues to live after the "death" of the Wub, and as such is highly prized owing to its postmortem production of a luxurious pelt that has numerous, albeit trivial, human applications. One such application is its use as a book cover by a Mars-based publisher who issues a new Latin volume of Lucretius' poem De Rerum Natura (On the Nature of Things).

Lucretius's poem represents one of the best preserved ancient sources of the materialist philosophy known as Epicureanism, which espoused a teleological metaphysical formula of atoms, randomness and determinism, an ethical doctrine promoting hedonism and, most notably for Dick's story, personal annihilation at death.

Dick's story begins with the book publisher receiving numerous complaints by purchasers of the Wub-covered volume of Lucretius. Many changes to essential passages in the text have been discovered; those originally advocating personal annihilation now suggest a postmortem eschatological state. Detective work by the publisher and his copyist reveals that non-Wub covered volumes did not experience similar amendments and furthermore that no amendments were made to the proofs sent to the printers. The remainder of the story provides a humorous and philosophically interesting counterpointing of the annihilatory statements in Lucretius' poem and the Wub fur that, somehow, amends it.

The publisher continues to experiment with the nature of volumes bound in Wub fur, including the Bible, which demonstrates similar amendments to the Lucretius poem. In the end, the publisher decides to take the test one step further, following the messages in the modified passages to see if the Wub fur can preserve other items—including bodies—in the same way it preserves itself.

== Reception ==
Dick said of the story:

Here I presented what used to be a wish on my part: that the Bible was true. Obviously, I was at a sort of halfway point between doubt and faith. Years later I'm still in that position; I'd like the Bible to be true, but—well, maybe if it isn't we can make it so. But, alas, it's going to take plenty of work to do it.

== Sources ==
- The Three Stigmata of Philip K Dick
- Epicureanism after Epicurus: the Influence of Epicurus on Western Thought
