= Fair Game (short story) =

1959 short story by Philip K. Dick

"Fair Game" is a science fiction short story written by Philip K. Dick in 1953 and first published in 1959 in If Magazine. The story was re-published in the third collected volume of Dick's short stories, The Father-thing in 1987.

== Plot ==
"Fair Game" centers on a man who believes he is being watched by something "god-like". Ultimately, the reader learns that the man is nothing more than game for malevolent creatures using Earth as a hunting ground.
