= The Impossible Planet (short story) =

1953 science fiction short story by Philip K. Dick

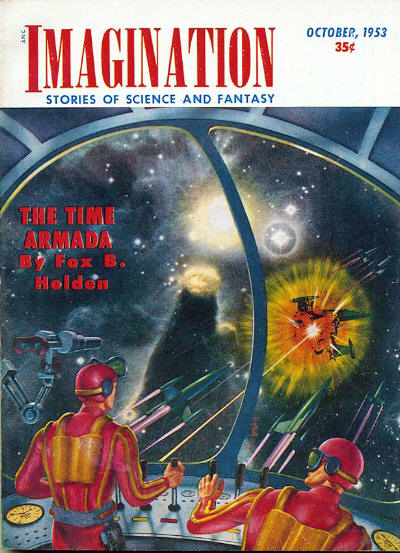
"The Impossible Planet" was originally published in the October 1953 issue of Imagination.

"The Impossible Planet" is a science fiction short story by American writer Philip K. Dick, first published in the October 1953 issue of Imagination. It has been reprinted over 30 times, including Brian Aldiss's 1974 Space Odysseys anthology. It was also published in Dutch, French, German and Italian translations. The writer originally submitted it to the Scott Meredith Literary Agency on February 11, 1953, with the title "Legend."

== Plot ==
A 350-year-old woman asks the captain of an interplanetary ship to take her to Earth. As Earth is believed to be a myth, the captain finds a record of a planet that is not called "Earth" but has one moon, and is in a star system of nine planets. The four main characters take the journey to this inhospitable destination: the captain, his more ethical crew member, the old woman, and the woman's robotic servant.

== Adaptation ==
The story was adapted and directed by David Farr as an episode of the Channel 4/Amazon Video anthology series Philip K. Dick’s Electric Dreams. The script is somewhat faithful to Dick's original story, but with the addition of a romantic sub-story, and with a more ambiguous ending.

=== Plot ===
Space tourism guide Brian Norton routinely augments the experiences of tourists with lighting tricks. While not conning the customers, he seeks a promotion and transfer to the tourism agency's corporate offices to please his upwardly-mobile girlfriend, Barbara. Norton and cynical space tourism agency branch manager Ed Andrews are approached by a 342-year-old woman, Irma Louise Gordon. Facing death from a heart condition and nearly completely deaf, Irma offers them each five times their annual salary to take her on a trip to Earth. As they are not sure the planet still exists, having been evacuated centuries before due to solar flares, they head for a similar planet. Irma's protective robot servant, RB29, deduces and maintains the subterfuge. Irma has a very specific dream about her grandparents swimming in a river in Carolina, and wants to re-enact this with Norton, who closely resembles her grandfather.

=== Cast ===
- Jack Reynor as Brian Norton
- Benedict Wong as Ed Andrews
- Geraldine Chaplin as Irma Louise Gordon
- Georgina Campbell as Barbara
- Malik Ibheis as RB29
