= War Veteran =

1955 short story by Philip K. Dick

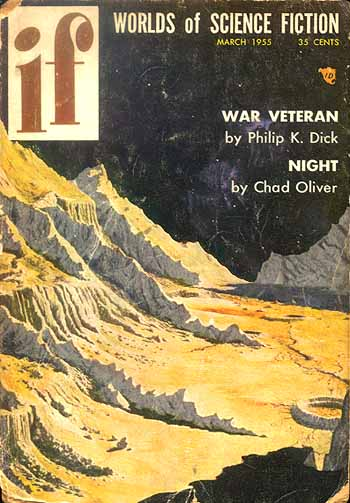
"War Veteran" was published in the March 1955 issue of If

"War Veteran" is a science fiction novelette by American writer Philip K. Dick. It was first published in If magazine in March 1955.

== Plot summary ==
The plot concerns an old man who claims to have travelled back in time from a future in which Earth has lost a devastating war to its own Martian and Venusian colonies. The man turns out to be a synthetic human, designed to trick the Earth people into believing they could never win the war, forcing them to make peace. This type of android is a forerunner of the type appearing in Dick's novel Do Androids Dream of Electric Sheep? and its film adaptation.

A similar, supposedly time-displaced "war veteran" character appears in Dick's novel The Zap Gun.
