= The Trouble with Bubbles =

1953 short story by Philip K. Dick

"The Trouble With Bubbles" is a 1953 science fiction short story by American writer Philip K. Dick. The story first appeared in If magazine, September 1953, and was first printed in book form in Second Variety, volume two of the five-volume The Collected Stories of Philip K. Dick, in 1987.

== Plot summary ==
The story is set in a future where mankind has attempted to reach other intelligent lifeforms through space exploration, and found nothing. In light of this yearning to connect with other lifeforms, people can buy a plastic bubble known as a Worldcraft, the tagline of which reads "Own Your Own World!". The owner of the Worldcraft is able to create a whole universe, controlling all the variables inherent to its development. Within the universe, lifeforms just like humans exist.

In the story we see Nathan Hull, the protagonist, attending a contest to judge who has created the best Worldcraft universe. A contestant subsequently smashes and destroys her bubble after being announced the winner. Hull, feeling the immorality of the control owners have over the lives within the bubbles, works to have laws passed against creating any more Worldcrafts. At the end of the story, Hull is about to drive through a newly built tunnel to Asia when an earthquake breaks it up, implying his world is a Worldcraft as well.

== See also ==
- Simulated reality
