= Pay for the Printer =

1956 short story by Philip K. Dick

"Pay for the Printer" is a science fiction short story by American writer Philip K. Dick. It was first published in Satellite Science Fiction, in October 1956. Manuscript dated January 28, 1954.

== Plot ==
In a war-ravaged future, humanity has come to depend on an alien species known as the Biltongs, possessed of the ability to replicate items identically – although the copies only last for a short time. When the Biltongs become decrepit, the humans are forced to rediscover the skill of building.

== Synopsis ==
The earth is devastated after a conflict involving the explosion of H-bombs. There are very few remnants of civilization and the lands are devastated due to the fact it doesn't rain anymore.

Allen Fergesson is a member of the Pittsburgh colony, the story begins in his car where he's with Charlotte, a member of a decaying colony where the Biltong is sick, and a mysterious man they picked up on the road. When they arrive at the colony everything is falling apart, they meet Ben trying to fuel his car at the gas station. They pick him up and then go to Charlotte's apartment but there are cracks all over the walls and wobbly scaffolding surrounds the building. She tries to get into the building but a structure falls on her, nobody is competent and the workers are only voluntary civilians. After finding new clothes for Charlotte which have turned to ashes they arrive at the Biltong which is formed of a yellow protoplasm topped by pseudopodia. Inside there's a core made of filaments. The alien seems tired and is surrounded by empty eggs, indeed the Biltongs have become sterile after they stay on Earth. Allen presents to the alien originals object that weren't previously duplicated in hopes of bringing him life again, but it fails. During their attempts, the group meets a man named John Dawes who presents the Biltong with a crude, hand-carved cup, which the Biltong also fails to copy. The crowd surrounding them becomes agitated when they see Allen's brand new car and a riot breaks out. Ben and Charlotte get away with the car.

Allen ends up with Dawes, a survivor of the Chicago colony which collapsed due to the death of their Biltong. He shows to Allen the mug of wood he made along with the primitive knife that made it and shares with him the importance of handcrafting instead of duplicating. He begins to show them that agriculture and arable land have not been fully lost, and how groundwater can still be used for irrigation. Dawes reiterates the importance of self-reliance, contrasting his stable hand-carved cup with the rapidly disintegrating prints of the remaining Biltong. Allen notes a cigarette lighter Dawes has, wondering if they'll be able to produce a tool of that caliber. Dawes replies: "not in our time, too many steps in between. But by God we're moving that way!" ending the story on a hopeful note.
