= The Days of Perky Pat =

1963 science fiction short story by Philip K. Dick

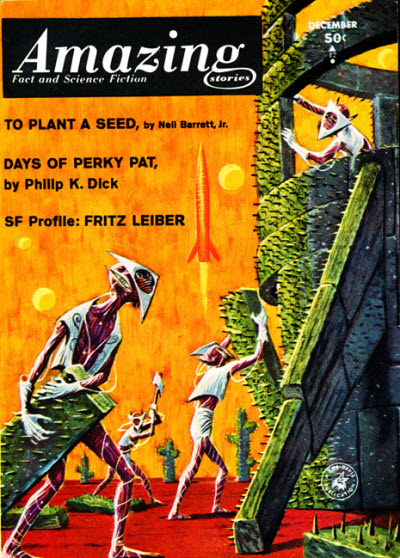
"The Days of Perky Pat" was originally published in the December 1963 issue of Amazing Stories

"The Days of Perky Pat" is a science fiction short story by American writer Philip K. Dick, first published in 1963 in Amazing magazine.

== Plot ==
In this short story, survivors of a global thermonuclear war live in isolated enclaves in California, surviving off what they can scrounge from the wastes and supplies delivered from Mars. The older generation spend their leisure time playing with the eponymous doll in an escapist role-playing game that recalls life before the apocalypse — a way of life that is being quickly forgotten. At the story's climax, a couple from one isolated outpost of humanity plays a game against the dwellers of another outpost (who play the game with a doll similar to Perky Pat dubbed "Connie Companion") in deadly earnest. The survivors' shared enthusiasm for the Perky Pat doll and the creation of her accessories from vital supplies is a sort of mass delusion that prevents meaningful re-building of the shattered society. In stark contrast, the children of the survivors show absolutely no interest in the delusion and have begun adapting to their new life.

== References in other works ==
Elements of the story were later incorporated into Dick's novel The Three Stigmata of Palmer Eldritch, written in 1964 and published in 1965, in which a Perky Pat simulation game is induced by drugs and miniature models.

David Cronenberg's 1999 film eXistenZ, which involves a virtual reality game that blurs reality and fantasy, visually refers to the Dick short story when its two stars, Jude Law and Jennifer Jason Leigh, consume fast food from containers marked "Perky Pat's".
