= Tony and the Beetles =

1953 short story by Philip K. Dick

"Tony and the Beetles" is a science fiction short story by American writer Philip K. Dick, first published in Orbit Science Fiction, No.2, in 1953.

The story is told from the point of view of a young boy, Tony, living on an alien world that humans have conquered. The native species are beetle like creatures called the Pas-udeti, some of whom Tony has befriended. As news reaches the planet that the war has turned against the humans, Tony attempts to carry on his daily life, to disastrous effect.
