= Exhibit Piece =

1954 science fiction short story by Philip K. Dick

"Exhibit Piece" is a 1954 science fiction short story by American writer Philip K. Dick. The story is an early exploration of the concept of shifting realities, a common theme in Dick's subsequent works. The protagonist is a future historian of the 20th century who finds himself shifting in time from the future to that time period. At first, it is unclear whether he is merely a man from the past imagining a future life, or vice versa.

The ending of the story remains ambiguous, as it is revealed that with the use of a "time gate", the man may have actually traveled through time. After a confrontation with his boss from the future through the time gate, they advise him that he needs to be euthanized and that they will deconstruct the exhibit, as they believe he has gone mad. The man, confident that they cannot travel via the time gate to get him and that destruction of the exhibit will simply close the time gate, returns to his home in the 20th century, only to read in the newspaper that Russia has created a bomb that will result in the destruction of the world.

It remains unclear whether the man has indeed traveled in time or has simply suffered from a mental collapse that has completely distorted his view of reality.

This is similar to Dick's later fiction, in which the concept of a fixed "reality" became increasingly ambiguous.

The plot was considerably modified when used as the basis for the episode "Real Life" in the TV series Philip K. Dick's Electric Dreams.
