= Human Is =

1955 science fiction short story by Philip K. Dick

"Human Is" is a science fiction short story by American writer Philip K. Dick. It was first published in Startling Stories, Winter 1955. The plot centers on the crisis facing a woman whose cold and emotionally abusive husband returns from a survey mission to the dying planet Rexor IV, changed for the better—his psyche was replaced by a Rexorian, glad to have escaped the confines of its dying planet.

The story was adapted by Jessica Mecklenburg for an episode of the 2017 TV series, Philip K. Dick's Electric Dreams.
