= The Hood Maker =

1955 short story by Philip K. Dick

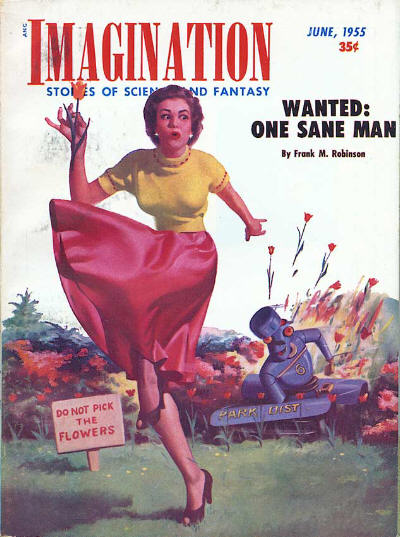
"The Hood Maker" was originally published in the June 1955 issue of Imagination.

"The Hood Maker" is a short story by Philip K. Dick, originally published in the June 1955 issue of the magazine Imagination. It was adapted by Matthew Graham into an episode for the 2017 TV series, Philip K. Dick's Electric Dreams.

== Plot ==
The Free Union, a repressive regime, uses people with telepathic powers called "teeps" to root out and eliminate its political opponents. Walter Franklin, a government appointee, is caught up in a struggle between the teeps and ordinary humans when he receives a hood which blocks his thoughts from being read. He is accused of subversion, called "deviation" by a teep named Ernest Abbud and forced to flee. When he meets the titular "hood maker", James Cutter, he learns a secret that could put an end to the teeps' plans to seize power.

== TV adaptation ==
The story was loosely adapted by Matthew Graham for Philip K. Dick's Electric Dreams, which aired on September 18, 2017 on Channel4 in the UK.

The whole emphasis is different. The Free Union, a repressive regime, uses people with telepathic powers called "teeps" to root out and eliminate its political opponents. The telepaths are unhappy and oppressed, and the entire society is run down and violent. All telepaths have skin markings on their face for unexplained reasons.

Agent Ross, a police detective, is given a telepathic woman as a partner. He also learns that someone is distributing hoods that block telepathy.
