= A Little Something for Us Tempunauts =

1975 short story by Philip K. Dick

- Short story by Philip K. Dick
- Country: United States
- Language: English
- Genre(s): Science fiction

Publication
- Published in: Final Stage (ISBN 0883270358)
- Publication type: Anthology
- Publisher: Charterhouse
- Media type: Print
- Publication date: 1974

"A Little Something for Us Tempunauts" is a science fiction short story by American writer Philip K. Dick. It was first published in the anthology Final Stage in 1974.

== Plot summary ==
Time travelers from the United States, called tempunauts, are sent only a few days into the future rather than a century as was intended. In this near-future, they learn their return from the future was fatal to them.

Addison Doug, one of the tempunauts, believes that they are trapped with the rest of the Earth in a closed time loop, forever doomed to repeat the period between their starting their trip and their fatal return. Having found out the cause of their fatal return journey, they have to decide whether to change or not to change their return journey in order to get out of the loop. Doug decides to sabotage "reentry" unbeknownst to the others—by smuggling a mass of car engine parts into the time machine—to both at the same time (and completely contradictorily) find resolution in death and close the time-loop, freezing all of humanity, and possibly the whole universe, in endless repetition of a single week.

== Reception ==
Strange Horizons noted the story's "slipstreamish effect of contemporary strangeness". The Encyclopedia of Science Fiction mentioned its "grim" nature.

== Background ==
Dick said in his afterword for The Best of Philip K. Dick:

In this story I felt a vast weariness over the space program, which had thrilled us so at the start—especially the first lunar landing—and then had been forgotten and virtually shutdown, a relic of history. I wondered, if time-travel became a "program" would it suffer the same fate? Or was there an even worse possibility latent in it, within the very nature of the paradoxes of time-travel?"
