= I Hope I Shall Arrive Soon =

1980 short story by American writer Philip K. Dick

"I Hope I Shall Arrive Soon" is a short story by American writer Philip K. Dick. The short story was first published in Playboy in December 1980, under the title "Frozen Journey".

== Plot summary ==
In the story, a man (Victor Kemmings) regains consciousness during a failed attempt at cryosleep on board a spaceship. According to what seems to be the ship's artificial intelligence, it cannot repair the malfunction and cannot wake him, so Kemmings is doomed to remain conscious but paralyzed through the ship's entire ten-year-long journey. To maintain his sanity, the A.I. claims it will replay Kemmings's memories to him. However, these memories become contaminated by deep-seated childhood guilt and neurotic anxieties, causing each simulated experience to deteriorate. The ship then asks Kemmings what he wants most, and he answers that he wants the trip to be over and to arrive at his new home. The A.I. constructs such a scenario and appears to recycle it repeatedly.The narrative suggests that during the journey, the ship contacts Kemmings's ex-wife Martine and arranges for her to meet him at the actual destination. When someone claiming to be Martine appears at what seems to be the journey's end, Kemmings cannot accept this as reality and insists it is yet another simulation. However, the story remains fundamentally indeterminate about whether Kemmings ever truly arrives, whether Martine is real, or whether the entire narrative, including the ship's apparent thoughts and plans, is itself part of Kemmings's deteriorating consciousness trapped in an endless recursive loop.

Like most of Philip K. Dick's work, I Hope I Shall Arrive Soon involves a questioning of what it is to be human and of what reality is. The story also has a theme of guilt, as the memories of the passenger are spoiled by the guilt he retains about his past actions.
