= The Hanging Stranger =

1953 science fiction short story by Philip K. Dick

"The Hanging Stranger" is a science fiction-horror short story by American writer Philip K. Dick, originally published in December 1953 in the magazine Science Fiction Adventures. It has been reprinted in several anthologies, and published in French, Italian and German. It was adapted by Dee Rees into the episode "Kill All Others" or "K.A.O." for the 2017 television series Philip K. Dick's Electric Dreams. A book was also released to republish "The Hanging Stranger" along with the nine other stories on which the Electric Dreams episodes were based.

== Plot ==
The protagonist, a store owner Ed Loyce, is disturbed when he sees a stranger hanging from a lamppost, but finds that other people consider the apparent lynching unremarkable.

He finds evidence that alien insects have taken over the town. He manages to get out, and talks to the police commissioner, who believes him. After getting all the information about what Ed knows, the commissioner explains that the body was hung to see whether anyone reacted to it, revealing anyone they did not have control over. He then takes Ed outside and hangs him from a telephone pole.

== TV adaptation ==
=== Plot ===
The television adaptation differs from the short story in having a more political focus. The protagonist, Philbert Noyce, played by Mel Rodriguez, is an unmotivated quality-control worker in an automated factory. Noyce hears and sees the phrase "kill all others" used during a television appearance by the sole candidate for the presidency in the one-party state of MexUsCan. Few others acknowledge seeing or hearing the message, but many are affected by it. Only one of Noyce's co-workers seems to believe what he says about the message and the political system. He becomes increasingly agitated by this policy statement and his totalitarian society over the course of the episode. His wife, workmates, and fellow citizens remain unconcerned by the "kill all others" message and by their society's heavy-handed responses to his concerns. A new, large, illuminated "kill all others" billboard appears with what looks like a body hanging in front of it, which does not appear to bother anyone. Noyce, now evading the authorities, who have identified him as an "other" and having his flight being broadcast on live television, climbs up on the billboard. He yells "we're all others!" and verifies that it is a real person in the noose by jumping onto him before falling off the billboard. His body is eventually hung in the place of the previous one.

=== Cast ===
- Mel Rodriguez as Philbert Noyce
- Sarah Baker as Maggie Noyce
- Jason Mitchell as Lenny
- Glenn Morshower as Ed
- Louis Herthum as Supervisor
- DuShon Monique Brown as Peace Sergeant
- Vera Farmiga as the Candidate
