= Faith of Our Fathers (short story) =

- Short story by Philip K. Dick
- Language: English
- Genre: Science fiction

Publication
- Published in: Dangerous Visions
- Publication type: Anthology
- Publisher: Doubleday
- Media type: Print (Hardcover)
- Publication date: 1967

"Faith of Our Fathers" is a science fiction short story by American writer Philip K. Dick, first published in the anthology Dangerous Visions (1967).

== Plot summary ==
Tung Chien is a Vietnamese bureaucrat in a world that has been conquered by Chinese-style atheist communism, where the population is kept docile with hallucinogenic drugs. When a street vendor gives Tung an illegal anti-hallucinogen, he discovers that the Party leader has a horrible secret.

== Reception ==
Algis Budrys said that "the first three-quarters of (the) story appear to be very good", and that although "Dick knows his hallucinogens very well", in "Faith of Our Fathers" "he makes sense only to himself".

"Faith of Our Fathers" was nominated for the 1968 Hugo Award for Best Novelette.

Dick later said about this story:

The title is that of an old hymn. I think, with this story, I managed to offend everybody, which seemed at the time to be a good idea, but which I've regretted since. Communism, drugs, sex, God — I put it all together, and it's been my impression since that when the roof fell in on me years later, this story was in some eerie way involved.

and

I don't advocate any of the ideas in Faith Of Our Fathers; I don't, for example, claim that the Iron Curtain countries will win the cold war—or morally ought to. One theme in the story, however, seems compelling to me, in view of recent experiments with hallucinogenic drugs: the theological experience, which so many who have taken LSD have reported. This appears to me to be a true new frontier; to a certain extent the religious experience can now be scientifically studied... and, what is more, may be viewed as part hallucination but containing other, real components. God, as a topic in science fiction, when it appeared at all, used to be treated polemically, as in OUT OF THE SILENT PLANET. But I prefer to treat it as intellectually exciting. What if, through psychedelic drugs, the religious experience becomes commonplace in the life of intellectuals? The old atheism, which seemed to many of us—including me—valid in terms of our experiences, or rather lack of experiences, would have to step momentarily aside. Science fiction, always probing what is about to be thought, become, must eventually tackle without preconceptions a future neo-mystical society in which theology constitutes as major a force as in the medieval period. This is not necessarily a backward step, because now these beliefs can be tested—forced to put up or shut up. I, myself, have no real beliefs about God; only my experience that He is present... subjectively, of course; but the inner realm is real too. And in a science fiction story one projects what has been a personal inner experience into a milieu; it becomes socially shared, hence discussable. The last word, however, on the subject of God may have already been said: in A.D. 840 by John Scotus Erigena at the court of the Frankish king Charles the Bald. "We do not know what God is. God Himself does not know what He is because He is not anything. Literally God is not, because He transcends being." Such a penetrating—and Zen—mystical view, arrived at so long ago, will be hard to top; in my own experiences with psychedelic drugs I have had precious tiny illumination compared with Erigena.

== See also ==
- A Maze of Death
