= The Golden Man =

Science fiction short story by Philip K. Dick

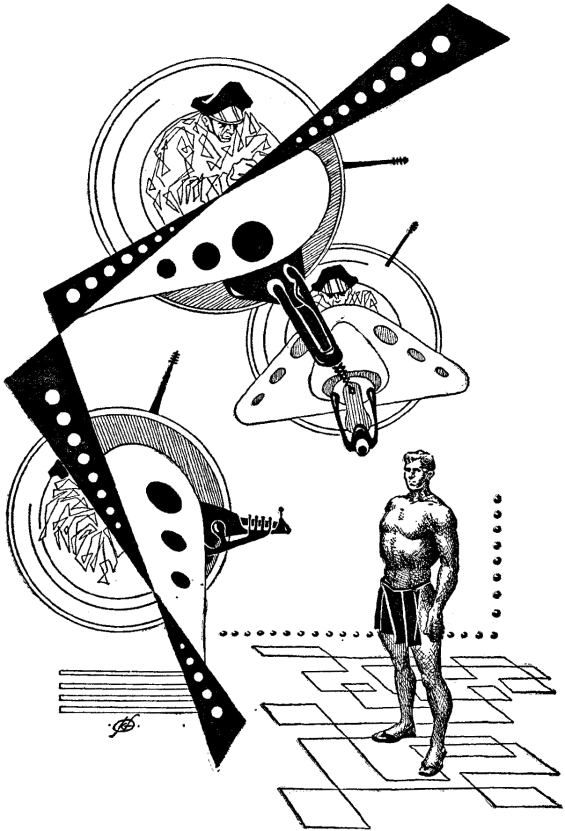
Illustration by Frank Kelly Freas for "The Golden Man" in If : Worlds of Science Fiction (April 1954)

"The Golden Man" is an 11,600-word science fiction short story by American writer Philip K. Dick. It was received by the Scott Meredith Literary Agency on June 24, 1953, and first published in the April 1954 issue of If magazine. The story was illustrated by Kelly Freas in its original publication. The story is set in a post-apocalyptic future where the existence of potentially powerful mutants has become a reality. The mutants are seen as dangerous and have been hunted to death by human beings for years. A golden-skinned mutant called Cris is captured by the government, which attempts to execute him. However, his appearance and abilities to see into the future allow him to escape.

== Plot summary ==
The protagonists of the story are a government agent and his fiancée who are members of a government agency tasked with tracking down and sterilizing or eliminating mutants – individuals with physical abnormalities and superhuman powers (such as mind reading or telekinesis) that make them a threat to normal humans. The eponymous "Golden Man" is a beautiful yet feral young man named Cris with gold-colored skin and the proportions of a Greek god. He possesses no language but has the ability to see into the future (specifically, the ability to see all possible outcomes from any single action, described in the story as similar to a chess player with the ability to see all possible moves 5 steps ahead). The agency manages to capture Cris after surrounding him so completely that his precognition tells him there's no way out, at which point he simply surrenders himself. The agency takes him back to their fortified laboratory to study his abilities and to execute him. However, unknown to the agency, Cris's physical perfection and noble-looking countenance influences the fiancée into freeing him. He then seduces her and makes his escape as she provides a distraction to aid him. The story ends with the protagonist reflecting on how animal instincts have triumphed over human intellect, and how that is the new direction evolution will take if Cris continues to breed children with his abilities.

== Reception ==
In the Story Notes for the collection The Golden Man, Dick wrote of the eponymous short story:

Here I am saying that mutants are dangerous to us ordinaries, a view which John W. Campbell, Jr. deplored. We were supposed to view them as our leaders. But I always felt uneasy as to how they would view us. I mean, maybe they wouldn't want to lead us. Maybe from their superevolved lofty level we wouldn't seem worth leading. Anyhow, even if they agreed to lead us, I felt uneasy as where we would wind up going. It might have something to do with buildings marked SHOWERS but which really weren't.

== Film adaptation ==
The film Next, a very loose adaptation of "The Golden Man", was released in 2007. It was directed by Lee Tamahori and stars Nicolas Cage as Cris Johnson and co-stars Julianne Moore, Jessica Biel, Thomas Kretschmann, and Peter Falk.
