= Impostor (short story) =

Short story by Philip K. Dick

"Impostor" is a science fiction short story by American writer Philip K. Dick. It was first published in Astounding SF magazine in June 1953.

== Plot ==
Spence Olham, a member of a team designing an offensive weapon to destroy invading aliens known as the Outspacers, is confronted by a colleague and accused by security officer Major Peters of being an android impostor designed to sabotage Earth's defenses. The impostor's spaceship was damaged and has crashed just outside the city. The android is supposed to detonate a bomb on the utterance of a deadly code phrase. Olham, in an attempt to clear his name and prove his humanity, manages to escape his captors and return to Earth after they fail to kill him on the Moon. Upon reaching Earth, Olham contacts his wife, Mary, but is soon ambushed by security officers waiting for him by his house. Out of options and with Major Peters' forces closing in, Olham decides to prove he is a human by finding the crashed Outspacer spaceship and recovering the android's body from the wreckage. The discovery of a bloody knife by the wreckage indicates to Olham that Peters was correct and that the real Spence Olham had already been killed. The android, now aware of the truth of its existence, proclaims "If that's Olham, then I must be..." causing the bomb to detonate, the explosion visible even to the Outspacers of Alpha Centauri.

== Adaptations ==
The story was adapted in 1962 as an episode of the British science fiction television series Out of This World. Like most episodes of the show, it was wiped and is now lost, although an incomplete audio-only recording has survived and is available on DVD.

Whispers, the season 2, episode 14 of Star Trek: Deep Space Nine, released in 1994.

Impostor, a feature film based on the story, was released in 2001 starring Gary Sinise, Madeleine Stowe and Vincent D'Onofrio.

== See also ==
- 1953 in science fiction
- Science Fiction Golden Age
