= Sales Pitch (short story) =

1954 science fiction short story by Philip K. Dick

- Short story by Philip K. Dick
- Country: United States
- Language: English
- Genre(s): Science fiction short story

Publication
- Published in: Future Science Fiction
- Publication type: Periodical
- Media type: Print
- Publication date: June 1954

"Sales Pitch" is a science fiction short story by American writer Philip K. Dick, first published in Future Science Fiction magazine, June 1954. The premise is the omnipresent, intrusive and even aggressive advertising and marketing. At the end of the story, the protagonist is driven mad by a robot who can forcefully market himself, and refuses to take no for an answer. The subject was of concern to Dick, and features in his early works such as The Man Who Japed.

== Ending ==
In 1978, Dick said of the story:

When this story first appeared, the fans detested it. I read it over, perplexed by their hostility, and could see why: it is a superdowner story, and relentlessly so. Could I rewrite it, I would have it end differently. I would have the man and the robot, i.e. the fasrad, form a partnership at the end and become friends. The logic of paranoia of this story should be deconstructed into its opposite; Y, the human-against-robot theme, should have been resolved into null-Y, human-and-robot-against-the-universe. I really deplore the ending. So when you read the story, try to imagine it as it ought to have been written. The fasrad says, 'Sir, I am here to help you. The hell with my sales pitch. Let's be together forever.' Yes, but then I would have been criticized for a false upbeat ending, I guess. Still, the ending is not good. The fans were right."

For a 1989–1990 radio series, Sci Fi Radio produced an audio play version of this story which is now available for free download. The story was adapted by Tony Grisoni for the episode "Crazy Diamond" of the 2017 TV series Philip K. Dick's Electric Dreams.
