= The Short Happy Life of the Brown Oxford (collection) =

1990 collection of science fiction stories by Philip K. Dick

- Cover of the first edition
- Author: Philip K. Dick
- Language: English
- Genre: Science fiction
- Publisher: Citadel Twilight
- Publication date: 1990
- Publication place: United States
- Media type: Print (paperback)
- Pages: 404
- ISBN: 0-8065-1153-2
- OCLC: 21741228
- Dewey Decimal: 813/.54 21
- LC Class: PS3554.I3 A6 2002b

The Short Happy Life of the Brown Oxford is a collection of science fiction stories by American writer Philip K. Dick. It was first published by Citadel Twilight in 1990 and reprints Volume I of The Collected Stories of Philip K. Dick. Many of the stories had originally appeared in the magazines Fantasy and Science Fiction, Planet Stories, If, Galaxy Science Fiction, Imagination, Space Science Fiction, Fantastic Story Magazine, Amazing Stories, Future, Cosmos, Fantasy Fiction, Beyond Fantasy Fiction, Thrilling Wonder Stories and Startling Stories. The collection was reprinted by Citadel Press in 2003 under the title Paycheck and Other Classic Stories.

== Contents ==
- Preface, from a letter to John Betancourt
- Foreword, by Steven Owen Godersky
- Introduction, by Roger Zelazny
- "Stability"
- "Roog"
- "The Little Movement"
- "Beyond Lies the Wub"
- "The Gun"
- "The Skull"
- "The Defenders"
- "Mr. Spaceship"
- "Piper in the Woods"
- "The Infinites"
- "The Preserving Machine"
- "Expendable"
- "The Variable Man"
- "The Indefatigable Frog"
- "The Crystal Crypt"
- "The Short Happy Life of the Brown Oxford"
- "The Builder"
- "Meddler"
- "Paycheck"
- "The Great C"
- "Out in the Garden"
- "The King of the Elves"
- "Colony"
- "Prize Ship"
- "Nanny"
- Notes
