= The Collected Stories of Philip K. Dick =

1987 collection of science fiction stories by Philip K. Dick

- One of the limited edition releases
- Author: Philip K. Dick
- Language: English
- Genre: Science fiction
- Publisher: Underwood-Miller
- Publication date: 1987
- Publication place: United States
- Media type: Print (hardback)
- Pages: xxii, 404 (vol. I) xiii, 395 (vol. II) xiii, 376 (vol. III) xi, 380 (vol. IV) ix, 395 (vol. V)
- ISBN: 0-88733-053-3
- OCLC: 15182853
- LC Class: PS3554.I3 A15 1987

The Collected Stories of Philip K. Dick is a collection of 118 science fiction stories by American writer Philip K. Dick. It was first published by Underwood-Miller in 1987 as a five volume set. See Philip K. Dick bibliography for information about the mass market reprints.

Many of the stories had originally appeared in the magazines Fantasy and Science Fiction, Planet Stories, If, Galaxy Science Fiction, Imagination, Space Science Fiction, Fantastic Story Magazine, Amazing Stories, Future Science Fiction, Cosmos, Fantasy Fiction, Beyond Fantasy Fiction, Thrilling Wonder Stories, Startling Stories, Fantastic Universe, Science Fiction Quarterly, Astounding, Science Fiction Adventures, Science Fiction Stories, Orbit, Satellite Science Fiction, Imaginative Tales, Fantastic, Worlds of Tomorrow, Escapade, Famous Science Fiction, Niekas, Rolling Stone College Papers, Interzone, Playboy, Omni and The Yuba City High Times.

== Contents ==
=== Volume I, Beyond Lies the Wub ===
- Preface from a letter to John Betancourt
- Foreword by Steven Owen Godersky
- Introduction by Roger Zelazny
- Stability
- Roog
- The Little Movement
- Beyond Lies the Wub
- The Gun
- The Skull
- The Defenders
- Mr. Spaceship
- Piper in the Woods
- The Infinites
- The Preserving Machine
- Expendable
- The Variable Man
- The Indefatigable Frog
- The Crystal Crypt
- The Short Happy Life of the Brown Oxford
- The Builder
- Meddler
- Paycheck
- The Great C
- Out in the Garden
- The King of the Elves
- Colony
- Prize Ship
- Nanny
- Notes

=== Volume II, Second Variety ===
- Introduction by Norman Spinrad
- The Cookie Lady
- Beyond the Door
- Second Variety
- Jon's World
- The Cosmic Poachers
- Progeny
- Some Kinds of Life
- Martians Come in Clouds
- The Commuter
- The World She Wanted
- A Surface Raid
- Project: Earth
- The Trouble with Bubbles
- Breakfast at Twilight
- A Present for Pat
- The Hood Maker
- Of Withered Apples
- Human Is
- Adjustment Team
- The Impossible Planet
- Impostor
- James P. Crow
- Planet for Transients
- Small Town
- Souvenir
- Survey Team
- Prominent Author
- Notes

=== Volume III, The Father-Thing ===
- Introduction by John Brunner
- Fair Game
- The Hanging Stranger
- The Eyes Have It
- The Golden Man
- The Turning Wheel
- The Last of the Masters
- The Father-Thing
- Strange Eden
- Tony and the Beetles
- Null-O
- To Serve the Master
- Exhibit Piece
- The Crawlers
- Sales Pitch
- Shell Game
- Upon the Dull Earth
- Foster, You’re Dead
- Pay for the Printer
- War Veteran
- The Chromium Fence
- Misadjustment
- A World of Talent
- Psi-Man Heal My Child!
- Notes

=== Volume IV, The Days of Perky Pat ===
- "How Do You Know You're Reading Philip K. Dick?", by James Tiptree, Jr.
- "Autofac"
- "Service Call"
- "Captive Market"
- "The Mold of Yancy"
- "The Minority Report"
- "Recall Mechanism"
- "The Unreconstructed M"
- "Explorers We"
- "War Game"
- "If There Were No Benny Cemoli"
- "Novelty Act"
- "Waterspider"
- "What the Dead Men Say"
- "Orpheus with Clay Feet"
- "The Days of Perky Pat"
- "Stand-by"
- "What'll We Do with Ragland Park?"
- "Oh, to Be a Blobel!"
- Notes

=== Volume V, The Little Black Box ===
- Introduction by Thomas M. Disch
- "The Little Black Box"
- "The War with the Fnools"
- "A Game of Unchance"
- "Precious Artifact"
- "Retreat Syndrome"
- "A Terran Odyssey"
- "Your Appointment Will Be Yesterday"
- "Holy Quarrel"
- "We Can Remember It for You Wholesale"
- "Not By Its Cover"
- "Return Match"
- "Faith of Our Fathers"
- "The Story to End All Stories for Harlan Ellison’s Anthology ''Dangerous Visions''"
- "The Electric Ant"
- "Cadbury, the Beaver Who Lacked"
- "A Little Something for Us Tempunauts"
- "The Pre-persons"
- "The Eye of the Sibyl"
- "The Day Mr. Computer Fell out of its Tree"
- "The Exit Door Leads In"
- "Chains of Air, Web of Aether"
- "Strange Memories of Death"
- "I Hope I Shall Arrive Soon"
- "Rautavaara's Case"
- "The Alien Mind"
- Notes

=== Missing Short Stories ===
The following stories are ones that were left out of this collection.

- "Goodbye, Vincent" (unpublished until after this collection was compiled)
- "Menace React" (only a fragment remains, and it was unpublished until after this collection was compiled)
- "Time Pawn" (1954; later expanded into the 1960 novel Dr. Futurity)
- "Vulcan's Hammer" (1956; later expanded into the 1960 novel Vulcan's Hammer)
- "A Glass of Darkness" (1956; later expanded into the 1957 novel The Cosmic Puppets)

== Publication states ==
The set was published in four states:

- 3 copies were quarterbound in calfskin with a handmade slipcase and the (deceased in 1982) author's signature tipped in.
- 100 copies were bound in red buckram, slipcased, with the author's signature taken from his canceled checks, laid in.
- 405 copies were bound in tan and brown cloth, slipcased, but without signature. (400 of these are numbered from 101–500 and 5 are presentation copies.)
- 800 copies were bound with a yellow-orange binding and did not have a slipcase.

The volumes were not sold individually. All sets except the trade edition (800 copies) also included a chapbook, "Brief Synopsis for An Alternate World Novel: The Acts of Paul, an outline for a novel that was never written.

== Sources ==
- Brown, Charles N.; William G. Contento. "The Locus Index to Science Fiction (1984–1998)".
- Chalker, Jack L.; Mark Owings (1998). The Science-Fantasy Publishers: A Bibliographic History, 1923–1998. Westminster, MD and Baltimore: Mirage Press, Ltd. pp. 673–674.
