= Beyond Lies the Wub (collection) =

1988 collection of science fiction stories by Philip K. Dick

- Dust-jacket from the first edition
- Author: Philip K. Dick
- Language: English
- Genre: Science fiction
- Publisher: Gollancz
- Publication date: 1988
- Publication place: United Kingdom
- Media type: Print (hardback)
- Pages: 404
- ISBN: 0-575-04407-1
- OCLC: 18070610

Beyond Lies the Wub is a collection of science fiction stories by American writer Philip K. Dick. It was first published by Gollancz in 1988 and later comprised Volume I of The Collected Stories of Philip K. Dick. Many of the stories had originally appeared in the magazines Fantasy and Science Fiction, Planet Stories, If, Galaxy Science Fiction, Imagination, Space Science Fiction, Fantastic Story Magazine, Amazing Stories, Future, Cosmos, Fantasy Fiction, Beyond Fantasy Fiction, Thrilling Wonder Stories, Startling Stories. The collection was reprinted by Citadel Press in 2003 under the title Paycheck and Other Classic Stories.

== Contents ==
- Preface, from a letter to John Betancourt
- Introduction, by Roger Zelazny
- "Stability"
- "Roog"
- "The Little Movement"
- "Beyond Lies the Wub"
- "The Gun"
- "The Skull"
- "The Defenders"
- "Mr. Spaceship"
- "Piper in the Woods"
- "The Infinites"
- "The Preserving Machine"
- "Expendable"
- "The Variable Man"
- "The Indefatigable Frog"
- "The Crystal Crypt"
- "The Short Happy Life of the Brown Oxford"
- "The Builder"
- "Meddler"
- "Paycheck"
- "The Great C"
- "Out in the Garden"
- "King of the Elves"
- "Colony"
- "Prize Ship"
- "Nanny"
- Notes
