= A Handful of Darkness =

1955 book by Philip K. Dick

- Dust-jacket from the first edition
- Author: Philip K. Dick
- Language: English
- Genre: Science fiction and fantasy
- Publisher: Rich & Cowan
- Publication date: 1955
- Publication place: United Kingdom
- Media type: Print (hardback)
- Pages: 224

A Handful of Darkness is a collection of science fiction and fantasy stories by American writer Philip K. Dick. It was first published by Rich & Cowan in 1955 and was Dick's first hardcover book.

The stories originally appeared in the magazines Galaxy Science Fiction, Astounding Stories, The Magazine of Fantasy & Science Fiction, Fantastic Universe, If, Amazing Stories, Imagination, Fantastic Story Magazine, Science Fiction Stories, Beyond Fantasy Fiction and Fantasy Fiction.

== Contents ==
- "Colony"
- "Impostor"
- "Expendable"
- "Planet for Transients"
- "Prominent Author"
- "The Builder"
- "The Little Movement"
- "The Preserving Machine"
- "The Impossible Planet"
- "The Indefatigable Frog"
- "The Turning Wheel"
- "Progeny"
- "Upon the Dull Earth"
- "The Cookie Lady"
- "Exhibit Piece"
