= Paycheck (collection) =

2004 collection of science fiction stories by Philip K. Dick

- Dust-jacket from the first edition
- Author: Philip K. Dick
- Language: English
- Genre: Science fiction
- Publisher: Gollancz
- Publication date: 2003
- Publication place: United Kingdom
- Media type: Print (hardback)
- Pages: 312
- ISBN: 0-575-07001-3
- OCLC: 53123257

Paycheck is a collection of science fiction stories by American writer Philip K. Dick. Although the collection appears with a 2003 copyright, it was first published by Gollancz in February, 2004. Many of the stories had originally appeared in the magazines Imagination, Startling Stories, Amazing Stories, Fantasy and Science Fiction and Galaxy Science Fiction.

== Contents ==
- "Paycheck"
- "Nanny"
- "Jon’s World"
- "The Little Movement""
- "Breakfast at Twilight"
- "Small Town"
- "The Father-Thing"
- "The Chromium Fence"
- "Autofac"
- "The Days of Perky Pat"
- "Stand-by"
- "A Little Something for Us Tempunauts"
- "The Pre-persons"
