= The Preserving Machine =

1969 collection of science fiction stories by Philip K. Dick

- Cover of the first edition
- Author: Philip K. Dick
- Cover artist: Leo and Diane Dillon
- Language: English
- Genre: Science fiction
- Publisher: Ace Books
- Publication date: 1969
- Publication place: United States
- Media type: Print (paperback)
- Pages: 317

The Preserving Machine is a collection of science fiction stories by American writer Philip K. Dick. It was first published by Ace Books in 1969 with cover art by Leo and Diane Dillon as part of their Ace Science Fiction Specials series. The stories had originally appeared in the magazines Fantasy and Science Fiction, Galaxy Science Fiction, Beyond Fantasy Fiction, If, Amazing Stories, Planet Stories, Worlds of Tomorrow, Imagination and Satellite.

A hardcover issue of this book was released through the Book-of-the-Month Club (USA) in late 1969 and remained available through 1970. It is an octavo-sized book, bound in gray textured paper boards, stamped in green on the spine, in a dust-cover with "Book Club Edition" printed in lieu of the price on the bottom front flap. Other hardcover editions were published in 1971 and 1972 respectively by Victor Gollancz Ltd, London, and the Science Fiction Book Club, Newton Abbot, Devon.

== Contents ==
- "The Preserving Machine"
- "War Game"
- "Upon the Dull Earth"
- "Roog"
- "War Veteran"
- "Top Stand-By Job"
- "Beyond Lies the Wub"
- "We Can Remember It for You Wholesale"
- "Captive Market"
- "If There Were No Benny Cemoli"
- "Retreat Syndrome"
- "The Crawlers"
- "Oh, to be a Blobel!"
- "What the Dead Men Say"
- "Pay for the Printer"

== Sources ==
- "Internet Speculative Fiction Database".
- Contento, William G. "Index to Science Fiction Anthologies and Collections". Archived from the original on January 7, 2008.
