= Paycheck (disambiguation) =

A paycheck is a paper document issued by an employer to pay an employee for services rendered.

Paycheck may also refer to:

- "Paycheck" (short story), a 1953 short story by Philip K. Dick
- Paycheck (film), a 2003 film adaptation of the Philip K. Dick short story
- Paycheck (collection), a 2004 collection of stories by Philip K. Dick
- Beyond Lies the Wub (collection) or Paycheck and Other Classic Stories, a 1988 collection of stories by Philip K. Dick

== People with the surname ==
- Johnny Paycheck (1938–2003), American country music singer

== See also ==
- Paychex, a payroll outsourcing company
