= The Book of Philip K. Dick =

1973 collection of science fiction stories by Philip K. Dick

- Cover of the first edition.
- Author: Philip K. Dick
- Illustrator: Jack Gaughan (frontispiece)
- Cover artist: Karel Thole
- Language: English
- Series: The Book of ... series
- Genre: Science fiction
- Publisher: DAW Books
- Publication date: 1973
- Publication place: United States
- Media type: Print (paperback)
- Pages: 187
- Preceded by: The Book of Frank Herbert
- Followed by: The Book of Gordon Dickson

The Book of Philip K. Dick is a collection of science fiction stories by American writer Philip K. Dick. It was first published by DAW Books in 1973 as the fourth volume in its Book of ... series. The book was subsequently published in the United Kingdom by Coronet in 1977 under the title The Turning Wheel and Other Stories. The stories had originally appeared in the magazines Startling Stories, Science Fiction Stories, Galaxy Science Fiction, Orbit Science Fiction, Imaginative Tales and Amazing Stories.

== Contents ==
- "Nanny"
- "The Turning Wheel"
- "The Defenders"
- "Adjustment Team"
- "Psi-Man"
- "The Commuter"
- "A Present for Pat"
- "Breakfast at Twilight"
- "Shell Game"

== Sources ==
- Contento, William G. "Index to Science Fiction Anthologies and Collections". Archived from the original on January 7, 2008.
- Jaffery, Sheldon (1987). Future and Fantastic Worlds. Starmount House. p. 15. ISBN 1-55742-002-5.
