= The Variable Man (collection) =

1957 collection of stories by Philip K. Dick

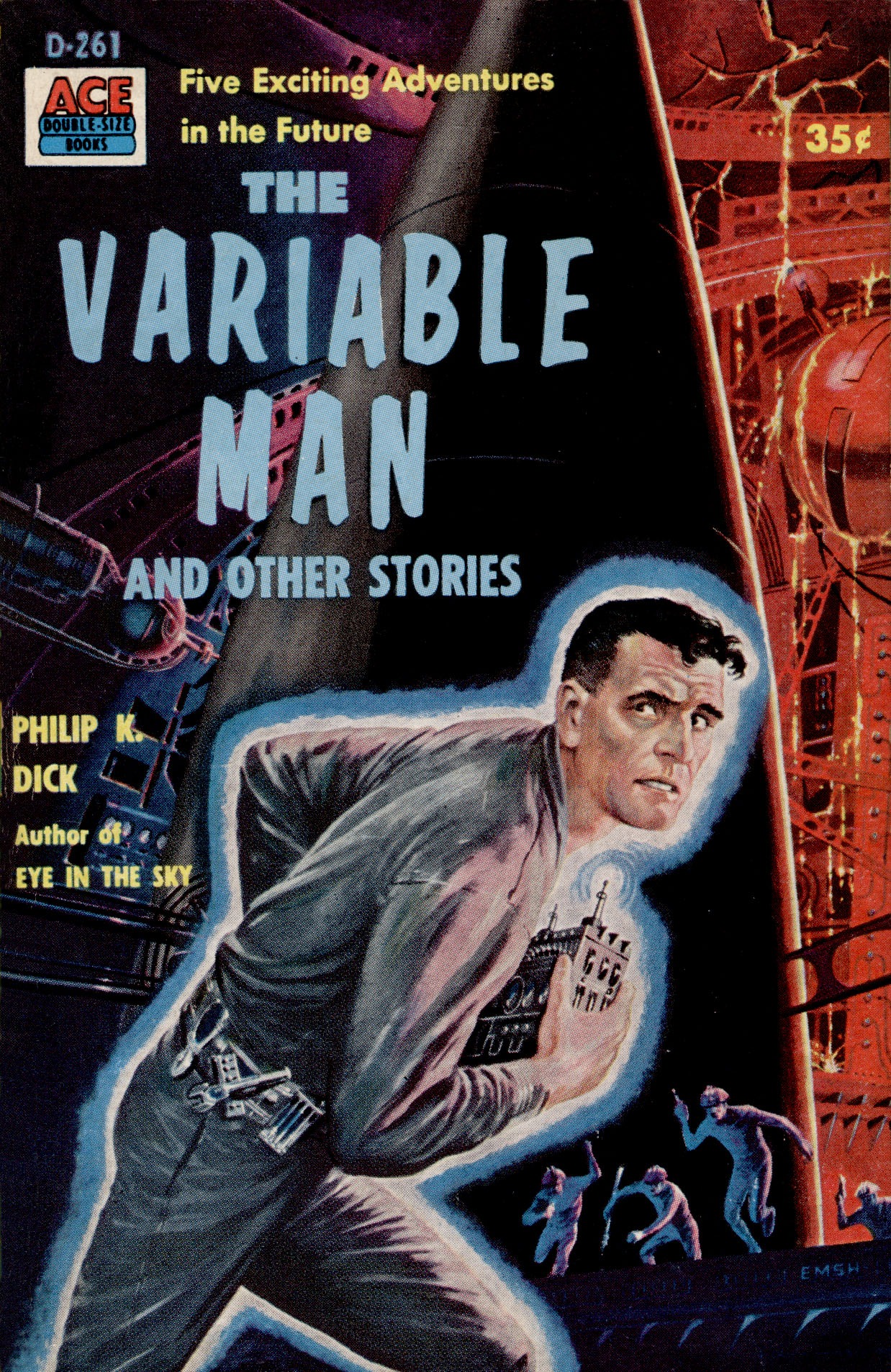
- Cover of the first edition
- Author: Philip K. Dick
- Language: English
- Genre: Science fiction
- Publisher: Ace Books
- Publication date: 1957
- Publication place: United States
- Media type: Print (paperback)
- Pages: 255

The Variable Man is a collection of science fiction stories by American writer Philip K. Dick. It was first published by Ace Books in 1957. The stories had originally appeared in the magazines Space Science Fiction, Fantastic Universe and Galaxy Science Fiction.

== Contents ==
- "The Variable Man", 1953
- "Second Variety", 1953
- "The Minority Report", 1955
- "Autofac", 1955
- "A World of Talent", 1954
