= Alexander Leydenfrost =

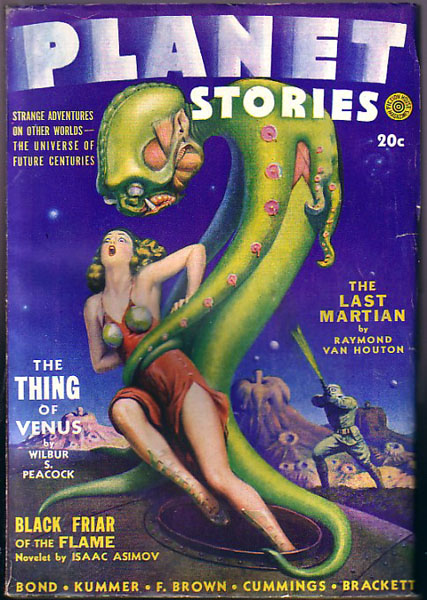
A characteristic Planet Stories cover, by Alexander Leydenfrost. Planet was one of the magazines to make the "bug-eyed monster", or "BEM", a staple of sf art.

Alexander Leydenfrost (Baron Sándor Leidenfrost) (March 18, 1888 in Debrecen – June 1961) was a Hungarian-born American industrial designer and illustrator. He was a baron in the Austro-Hungarian monarchy, with his family title dating back to the 16th century. Upon moving to the United States in the 1920s Leydenfrost altered the spelling of his name in an attempt to correct the mispronunciation of his name, and also changed his name from Sándor to the equivalent "Alexander".

Leydenfrost studied at the Royal Academy of Fine and Applied Arts of Budapest. In 1919, he was appointed as a professor of 'industrial design' at the Royal Joseph Technical University, also in Budapest. The collapse of Austria-Hungary caused him to emigrate to the United States in 1923, where he began working for the well known artist-illustrator William Andrew Pogany, designing stage sets and painting large murals, as well as being a featured regular in magazine publications. In 1929, Leydenfrost went to work for world-renowned industrial designer Norman Bel Geddes, developing Toledo Scale designs and also the re-design of the Chrysler Airflow. He was also involved with the design of the 1939 New York World's Fair Pavilion for General Motors.

In 1939 Leydenfrost turned from his career as an industrial designer to that of a professional illustrator-artist. He briefly worked for the science fiction magazine Planet Stories before being signed by Life magazine. Life needed someone who could illustrate unfolding events in Europe, and Leydenfrost's photo-realistic style filled the need. He continued to illustrate for Life throughout his career, in addition to other major magazines including Skyways, Liberty, Look, Popular Science and Esquire. Despite the small body of work he created for Planet Stories, many science fiction enthusiasts consider his artwork for that magazine to be that publication's finest.
