= The Variable Man =

1953 science fiction novella by Philip K. Dick

"The Variable Man" is a science fiction novella by American writer Philip K. Dick, which he wrote and sold before he had an agent. It was first published in the British magazine Space Science Fiction (British version) Vol. 2 No. 2, July 1953, and in the American version in September 1953, with the US publication illustrated by Alex Ebel. Despite the magazine cover dates, it is unclear whether the first publication was in the United Kingdom or in the United States where magazines tended to be published further ahead of their cover dates than in the UK. The Variable Man can be found in several collections of Dick's short stories, including The Variable Man and The Short Happy Life of the Brown Oxford.

== Copyright status ==
"The Variable Man" is in the public domain in the United States because it was published there between January 1, 1950, and December 31, 1963, but copyright was not renewed with the United States Copyright Office within the time frame beginning on December 31 of the 27th year of the copyright and running through December 31 of the following year. When renewal registration was not made within the statutory time limit, copyright expired at the end of its first term and protection was lost permanently.

== Plot summary ==
The human race has achieved space travel and begun to spread out from Earth, but is limited by an old and corrupt Centauran Empire, ruled from Proxima Centauri. The Empire fully encircles the Terran solar system and will not allow the humans to grow beyond it. Terra and the Centauran Empire effectively become locked in a cold war, with each side watching the other, but neither side attacking. Terra uses the almost prophetic SRB machines to calculate their chances to win a war versus Centauri and updates these calculations with each new development.

Terra eventually comes up with a concept for a bomb, called Icarus, that Proxima cannot defend against because it travels at faster-than-light (FTL) speeds. Icarus started as an experimental transport device, but the build-up of mass near light speed caused a huge explosion when the first prototype returned to sub-light speed, destroying the inventor and most of his equipment. Development of Icarus as a weapon alters the calculated odds in Terra's favour. There are two problems; the first is that another FTL device has not been made to work, and the second is the existence of a man from the past brought to the present. He is an "unknown variable" that confuses the SRB machines, making it impossible to accurately calculate the odds. That man is Thomas Cole, who became known as the Variable Man.

Cole is a man from 1913, the time just before the First World War. He is accidentally brought into the story's present by a "time bubble" that was used for research about the past. The authorities attempt to capture him, but he evades them and goes on the run. It is discovered that Cole has a genius for intuitively understanding and repairing machines, which he used to earn money as a repairman in his own time and again while on the run. Other characters speculate such abilities were more common in the pre-WWI era that produced inventors like Thomas Edison. The engineer working on the FTL bomb realizes the Variable Man might be able to make Icarus function and manages to track him down. Cole agrees to help on the understanding he will then be sent back to his own time with a quantity of precious metals to buy equipment for his repair business.

Cole eventually succeeds, and an Icarus device is launched toward Proxima Centauri with the intention of destroying the star and its planets while Earth's fleet attacks the empire's forces in space. The device fails to affect its target, leading to a crushing defeat for Terra.

Investigation reveals the star did not explode because Cole had made the Icarus device function fully according to its inventor's intentions, solving the problem that had destroyed the prototype. Instead of a powerful bomb, humanity now has a working FTL drive that cannot be intercepted by the Centaurans. The Terran authorities realize they are now free to travel beyond the limits of the Centauran Empire and there is no further need for war.
