= Strange Eden =

- Short story by Philip K. Dick
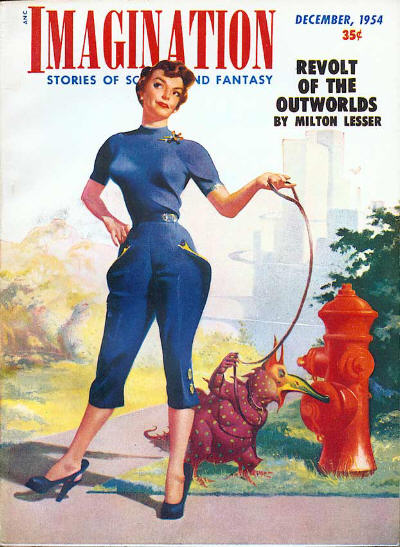
- Country: United States
- Language: English
- Genre(s): Science-fiction

Publication
- Published in: Imagination
- Publication type: Magazine
- Publication date: 1954

"Strange Eden" is a science fiction short story by American writer Philip K. Dick. It was first published in Imagination magazine during 1954, found under Second Variety and Other Classic Stories by Philip K. Dick in pp. 111–121.

== Plot ==
Brent is part of a planetary survey team led by Captain Johnson. The crew lands on a world that is unspoiled and Edenic, but also unnerves Johnson. The captain chooses to leave the planet, deeming it unnecessary for the survey. This puts him at odds with Brent, who wishes to search for non-human life. Seeing that the captain is unwilling, Brent explores the planet on his own. He encounters several large lion-like creatures that appear to be of no threat.

Brent also encounters a beautiful, immortal woman who states that her kind have been in contact with humanity throughout history and are responsible for its progression as a species. This causes Brent to theorize that her kind were likely responsible for humanity's myths, legends, and religions. The woman also remarks that she has learned his language via other Terran encounters and that she has been monitoring the ship's communications. Greatly attracted to the woman as she resembles an old lover, Brent tries to rape her after she mentions Johnson. She easily repels him using a protective belt, after which she demands that Brent leave. He refuses, causing her to both admire his bravery and chastise his foolishness. The woman agrees to sleep with Brent, but warns him afterwards that the encounter will change him. Despite seeing that she clearly does not care what will happen to him, Brent chooses to remain and promises that he will not blame her after he changes.

The woman is then shown approaching the survey team spaceship and informing Johnson that Brent will remain with her and the other men. Before he leaves the planet Johnson sees a large lion-like creature following the woman and later sees it express a human gesture, implying that the beast is Brent and that the other creatures he encountered were formerly human as well.

== Publication ==
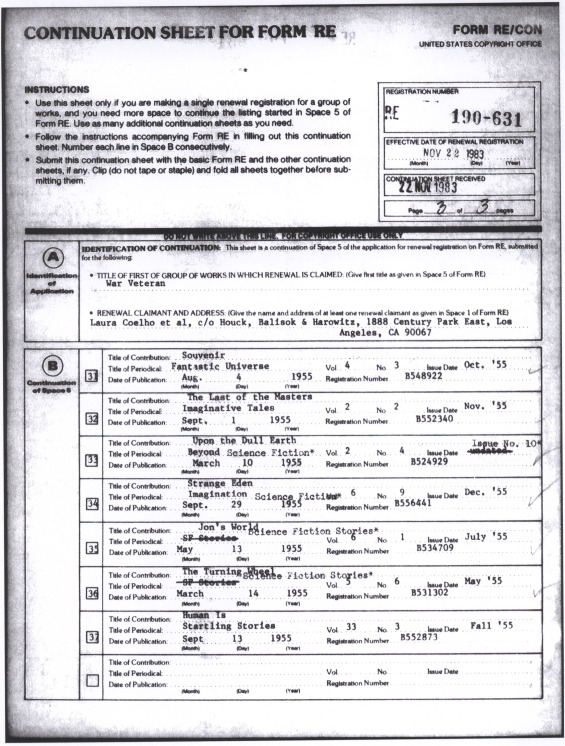
A copyright renewal notice listing the short story's publication date as December 1955.

"Strange Eden" was first published in the December 1954 issue Imagination magazine. It was first republished in collection format as part of the third volume of The Collected Stories of Philip K. Dick, which itself was later republished as the 1989 collection The Father-Thing. It has since been republished in several other collections of Dick's work, such as The Philip K. Dick Reader, and has been translated into both German and French.

In the 1983 copyright renewal for "Strange Eden" and other stories written by Dick, the publication date was listed as December 1955. SFFaudio, a speculative fiction website, has posited that this mistake places the story in the public domain as it did not contain the correct date and not renewed within the correct time period (1982) to extend copyright protections.

An audiobook adaptation of the story, narrated by Kate Rudd, was released as part of the audiobook collection The Collected Stories of Philip K. Dick: Volume 1 in 2010, through Brilliance Audio.

== Themes ==
Ellen Greenham has noted that "Strange Eden" contains the fantasy of an ideal represented by the cosmos, an ideal that "is ever expected and never found within the space-time of the universe". She states that the survey team encounters an Edenic world similar to their own, which makes the character of Captain Johnson uncomfortable as he is both aware of humanity's potential to degrade their environment as well as his awareness that "He may seek refuge in the desire for a pristine world in which to live, but he knows this is wishful thinking for something he has never had."
