= The Infinites =

1953 short story by Philip K. Dick

"The Infinites" is a science fiction short story by American writer Philip K. Dick, first published in 1953 in the May issue of Planet Stories. It has since been republished several times, including in Beyond Lies the Wub in 1988 and in The Collected Stories of Philip K. Dick.

== Plot summary ==
The plot centers around a crew of three on board a spaceship which scouts asteroid fields for new materials which can be mined. Led by Crispin Eller, the crew (which consists of second in command Blake and Silvia) land on an asteroid and send a pack of hamsters in order to check the radiation levels. Upon retrieving the hamsters, they discover that they've received a large doses of radiation and are lifeless.

Later, the crew themselves pass out of radiation and wake up several days later. Their hair falls out, their nails as well, and their heads swell to a larger size. Pondering over the changes, the crew realizes that the radiation has vastly increased their evolution, and that they've evolved millions of years in a matter of days. Blake insists on going back to Earth so they can assume control with their powerful minds, while Eller is more cautious. A fight breaks out, and Blake kills Silvia with energy he creates himself. As Blake is about to kill Eller, several large orbs of energy appear and destroy Blake. It is revealed that the orbs of energy are actually the hamsters which have received the radiation first, and have evolved millions of years and are now nothing but pure energy. The beings then revive Silvia and undo their evolution before leaving.
