= The Gun (short story) =

1952 short story by Philip K. Dick

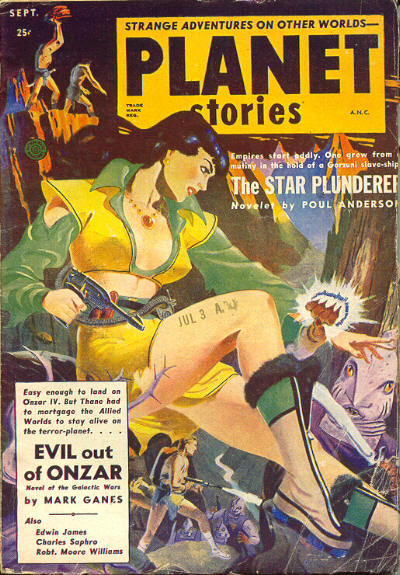
September 1952 issue of Planet Stories

"The Gun" is a science fiction short story by American writer Philip K. Dick, first published in 1952 September issue of Planet Stories, and later published in Beyond Lies the Wub in 1984. "The Gun" has been published in Italian, German, French and Polish translations.

== Plot summary ==
The plot centers around a group of space explorers who investigate a planet which appears deserted. However, they are shot down and crash land on the planet. While repairing their ship, a team of explorers sets to survey the surrounding area, where they discover the ruins of an ancient city. Upon further investigation, it is revealed that the gun which shot them down is in the city, and is programmed to shoot anything down which enters the airspace above the city. They examine the gun and discover that it is protecting a tomb directly underneath it—a tomb which contains artifacts, film and photographs of a lost civilization. In order to prevent themselves from being shot down by the same gun while attempting to leave the planet, they destroy the gun and take the artifacts with them. As they leave the planet, hoping to return one day, it is revealed that several automatized machines have begun to repair and reload the gun once more.
