= The Cookie Lady (short story) =

1953 short story by Philip K. Dick

- Short story by Philip K. Dick
- Country: United States
- Language: English
- Genre: Horror short story

Publication
- Published in: Fantasy Fiction
- Media type: Print, magazine
- Publication date: June 1953

"The Cookie Lady" is a horror short story by the American writer Philip K. Dick. It was originally published in the June 1953 issue of the magazine Fantasy Fiction.

== Plot summary ==
Bernard "Bubber" Surle is a young boy who enjoys visiting Mrs. Drew, a lonely old widow who bakes him cookies. He visits her after school every day and reads to her after eating cookies. Mrs. Drew, who has almost no company, enjoys having him. One day, she begins to undergo a transformation while he is there, becoming younger. Bubber, however, returns home very tired. His parents make him promise that his next visit will be his last. The next day, he stays longer, and Mrs. Drew is reverted to her younger self. Bubber, however, is drained of his physical energy, and while walking home he is reduced to dust and is carried away by the wind.
