= The Skull (short story) =

1952 science fiction story

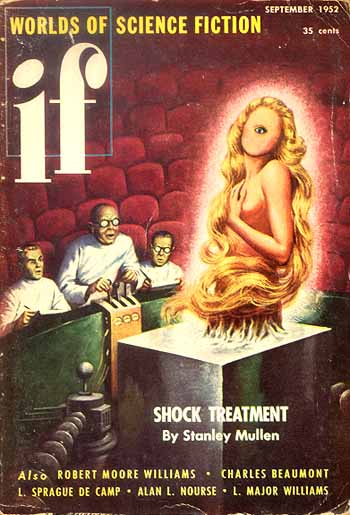
"The Skull" was originally published in the September 1952 issue of If

"The Skull" is a science fiction short story by American writer Philip K. Dick, first published in 1952 in If, and later in The Collected Stories of Philip K. Dick. It has since been republished several times, including in Beyond Lies the Wub in 1988.

== Plot synopsis ==
Conger, the protagonist, is given a chance to get out of jail if he agrees to kill a man who had died 200 years ago in the 1960's. This man gave a speech urging non-violent lifestyle before being arrested and killed by police. Months later those that listened to this speech reported seeing the man again after his death and believed it a sign of his divinity. From the teachings of the man emerged a cult that quickly spread, eventually becoming opposed to technological and industrial advancement. Conger is given a skull from which he can identify the man, and is sent back in time in a capsule. First arriving several months after the man's death, Conger then travels back to a few days prior to when the man will give his speech. During this, Conger falls under suspicion of being a Communist as he is dressed up strangely and has a strange accent. As Conger prepares for the man's arrival, he discovers that the skull is his own, and he is the man who will change the world. As the time for the man's speech arrives, police and a town mob surround Conger. Due to the use of time travel, Conger realizes that even though he will die, another version of himself will reappear in a few months, as if resurrected. He tells the gathered crowd: "Those who take lives will lose their own. Those who kill, will die. But he who gives his own life away will live again!"
