= Alex Ebel =

Science fiction artist (1932–2013)

Alex Ebel (November 14, 1932 – December 6, 2013) was a science fiction and fantasy illustrator. Ebel painted the poster for the original Friday the 13th (1980), and an unused poster for Friday the 13th Part 2.

== Books ==
His illustrations for book covers include Galaxies and The Sun by Isaac Asimov, Evil Earths by Brian Aldiss, Ability Quotient by Mack Reynolds, Homefaring by Robert Silverberg and one of his most famous, The Left Hand of Darkness by Ursula K. Le Guin.

== Magazines ==
His art for magazines includes Space Science Fiction, Heavy Metal and Fantastic Story Magazine.

In addition, he illustrated for World Book.
