= Retreat Syndrome =

1965 short story by American writer Philip K. Dick

"Retreat Syndrome" is a 1965 short story by American writer Philip K. Dick. The story contains some common Dick themes such as a questionable reality and drug use. It was first published in Worlds of Tomorrow Science Fiction and was later reprinted the collections The Preserving Machine (1969), The Preserving Machine and Other Stories (1977), We Can Remember It For You Wholesale (2000) and The Eye of the Sibyl and Other Stories (2004).

== Plot summary ==
The story follows John Cupertino, a man seemingly under medical care, and his quest to find the truth behind the memory of him killing his wife.

It begins as Cupertino is caught speeding by police officers who suspect he may be on the drug 'Frohedadrine' and suggest that he probably believes he is not on Earth but is in the midst of a drug-induced guilt-fantasy and is actually at home on Ganymede. Cupertino disputes this and states he knows he is on Earth but is concerned that something strange is happening to him. To prove this he reaches out with his hand towards the dashboard. His hand disappears within the heavily-padded dashboard. The officers see this and contact Cupertino's full-time doctor, Dr. Hagopian. Cupertino tells the officers he believes this is happening because of the death of his wife, Carol.

Cupertino then has a conversation with Dr. Hagopian in which he tells the doctor that the reason he killed his wife was to stop her from telling the media that there was to be an uprising to free Ganymede. Dr. Hagopian gives Cupertino an address where he says Carol is currently living. Cupertino says this cannot be, as she was unmistakably dead after he left her, shot between the eyes with a laser beam. The doctor tells Cupertino he knows this is his detailed memory, but convinces him to go anyway, saying that Carol was there the night he killed her and therefore may be able to tell him how he obtained his false memory.

Cupertino arrives at Carol's address in Los Angeles at 6 in the morning. She invites him in and gives him coffee. He says she doesn't look a day older, even though the last time he saw her was three years ago. She tells him that the night he tried to kill her he received no false memory but was aware he failed in killing her. He apparently was offered by the district attorney a choice of mandatory psychiatric help or formal charges for attempted murder. She tells him the false memory was implanted after he visited Dr. Edgar Green, the psychologist at his employer, Six-Planet Educational Enterprises, just before he left Ganymede, and they did this because they knew he had told her of the planned uprising and he was supposed to commit suicide from remorse and grief but instead booked passage to Terra (Earth).

Cupertino speaks to Dr. Hagopian while at Carol's and tells him he believes he is actually a prisoner on Ganymede and what he is experiencing at Carol's is an illusion. Hagopian tells him this is not true, he is actually on Terra but is not a free man for the fact that he must remain a patient of his as part of the District Attorney's orders. Cupertino tells Hagopian that he has learned Carol is employed by the parent company of Six-Planet Educational Enterprises, Falling Star Associates. He believes she was sent down to earth as a watchdog to see that he remained loyal and would not tell of the proposed uprising on Ganymede. Hagopian tells Cupertino that this cannot be the case as the uprising happened three years ago and is a matter of historical fact. Ganymede and two other moons overthrew Terra and became self-governing in the Tri-Lunar war of 2014.

Cupertino returns to his apartment and contacts Dr. Edgar Green of Six-Planet Educational Enterprises. He requests his case history be sent to him. He comes to the conclusion that they could easily tamper with the file in order to hide any procedure of memory implant. He receives the file and finds that it contains no reference to the implant. He sends the file off for analysis and requests a blood fraction test from Dr. Hagopian for traces of Frohedadrine. The doctor tells him this would not matter; if he still believes the theory that he is a prisoner on Ganymede, then all these things would be illusory too. Hagopian tells Cupertino that Carol is actually a prisoner on Ganymede and that is where he visited her. She is imprisoned because she told Terra of the planned revolt. The doctor tells him that the guilt of him telling Carol and causing the Terra to be alerted of the revolt by Ganymede caused him to retreat into a fantasy world. He tells the doctor that to test his memory of killing Carol, he will return to Los Angeles and try and kill her again. If she is already dead then it will prove impossible.

The story continues in Hagopian's office, with Cupertino looking through the Los Angeles Times, searching for the story of the recent murder of his wife. His search is in vain, as Hagopian tells him that he was not permitted to go to Los Angeles because the authorities knew he planned violence. Cupertino tells him he is sure he killed her, walking into her office and shooting her with a laser while her co-workers watched. Hagopian says he now has a delusional memory of killing her twice now. The doctor calls Carol to prove this on a video phone. When Cupertino sees Carol on the display and she acknowledges him, he asks to return to his apartment. On the way home he admits to himself there are gaps in his logic but realizes he could try once more to kill her. He directs his car to Los Angeles to where he believes his wife will be sleeping.
