= Paycheck (film) =

2003 American science fiction action film by John Woo

- Theatrical release poster
- Directed by: John Woo
- Written by: Dean Georgaris
- Based on: "Paycheck" by Philip K. Dick
- Produced by: John Woo; John Davis; Terence Chang; Michael Hackett
- Starring: Ben Affleck; Aaron Eckhart; Uma Thurman; Paul Giamatti; Colm Feore; Joe Morton; Michael C. Hall
- Cinematography: Jeffrey L. Kimball
- Edited by: Christopher Rouse; Kevin Stitt
- Music by: John Powell
- Production companies: Paramount Pictures; DreamWorks Pictures; Davis Entertainment; Lion Rock Entertainment
- Distributed by: Paramount Pictures (United States and Canada); DreamWorks Pictures (International)
- Release date: December 25, 2003
- Running time: 119 minutes
- Country: United States
- Language: English
- Budget: $60 million
- Box office: $117.2 million

Paycheck is a 2003 American science fiction action film directed and produced by John Woo. It was written by Dean Georgaris, based on the 1953 short story by Philip K. Dick. Starring Ben Affleck, Aaron Eckhart, and Uma Thurman, with Paul Giamatti, Colm Feore, Joe Morton, and Michael C. Hall in supporting roles, the film follows a reverse engineer who finds himself hunted by both the FBI and a tech CEO after his memory is erased.

Paycheck was released on December 25, 2003, by Paramount Pictures in North America and DreamWorks Pictures internationally to negative reviews from critics and grossed $117.2 million against a $60 million budget. Woo did not direct another American feature film until Silent Night (2023).

== Plot ==
In the near future, Michael Jennings is a reverse engineer who creates improved versions of clients' competitors' technology. To protect his clients' intellectual property and himself, Jennings undergoes memory wipes to remove knowledge of his engineering with aid of his friend Shorty. College roommate James Rethrick, the CEO of technology company Allcom, offers Jennings a three-year contract which requires him to stay on Allcom's campus, with payment in company stock. After being injected with a memory marker, Jennings tours the campus, flirts with biologist Dr. Rachel Porter and meets Rethrick's business partner, physicist William Dekker.

Three years later, Jennings wakes from the memory wipe. Rethrick congratulates him on his Allcom stock, valued at over US$92 million. Jennings attempts to access the funds through his lawyer and discovers he'd recently given the stock away. An envelope claiming to hold his possessions at the time he entered Allcom contains nothing but unfamiliar items. Jennings is detained by the FBI and Agent Dodge accuses Jennings of accessing classified government designs that had been taken by Dekker, who is now dead. The confused Jennings finds a means to escape using the items in the envelope. Rethrick's right-hand man John Wolfe observes Jennings evade the FBI, and tells Rethrick they have a problem. As Jennings and Shorty try to figure out what happened, a lottery number announced on television matches those on a fortune cookie message in the envelope. Jennings realizes he must have built a machine to see into the future, and planted items in the envelope to help fix things.

When Rethrick tries to use Jennings' machine, he finds it jury-rigged to go offline after Jennings left. Rethrick studies Jennings' routine at Allcom and discovers he became romantically involved with Porter, and left a secret message to meet her at a cafe later that day. Rethrick sends a body double to coerce Jennings into relinquishing the envelope, but the real Porter rescues Jennings. They elude the FBI and Rethrick's men. While hiding, they find microdots on the envelope that reveal newspaper headlines from the future. While Allcom becomes incredibly successful with the device, it leads to crises on the stock markets, international political strife, a pandemic and a U.S. launched pre-emptive nuclear strike. Jennings and Porter agree to destroy the machine. The FBI has also started an investigation into Allcom.

Using the last items in the envelope, Jennings and Porter gain access to Allcom's machine. Jennings repairs the circuit he rigged and booby-traps the machine to self-destruct. He uses the machine one last time to see himself being shot at by an FBI agent in the catwalks above. When Rethrick, Wolfe, and other men arrive, Jennings and Porter escape to the catwalks. Wolfe tries to use the machine to track Jennings, while Rethrick corners the pair on the catwalk. FBI agents storm the lab, and one appears on the catwalk, the same tableau that Jennings had seen. As the FBI fires, a watch from the envelope beeps, and Jennings dodges the bullet which kills Rethrick. Wolfe is killed when the machine blows up. As the FBI agents inspect the room, Dodge finds the watch Jennings had used, hides it, and declares him dead.

Jennings, Porter, and Shorty arrive in the countryside. Shorty has rescued a pair of red-rumped parrots Porter had been raising at Allcom. Recalling the fortune cookie message from the envelope, Jennings looks in the cage and finds a lottery ticket for the winning jackpot of US$90 million.

== Cast ==
- Ben Affleck as Michael Jennings, a reverse engineer
- Uma Thurman as Rachel Porter, a biologist and Jennings's lover
- Aaron Eckhart as James Rethrick, a billionaire CEO and Jennings' former friend
- Colm Feore as John Wolfe, Rethrick's right-hand man
- Peter Friedman as Attorney General Brown
- Paul Giamatti as Shorty, Jennings's friend
- Michael C. Hall as Agent Klein
- Ivana Milicevic as Maya-Rachel, the double for Rachel
- Kathryn Morris as Rita Dune
- Joe Morton as Agent Dodge
- Serge Houde as William Dekker
- Callum Keith Rennie as Jude – Guard

Additionally, Krista Allen appears as The Projection in a 3D computer Michael developed.

== Production ==
The film began development in 1996 when the short story was optioned by Caravan Pictures. Prior to John Woo being selected to direct, Brett Ratner was in talks to direct; Kathryn Bigelow was also considered. Matt Damon was offered the role of Michael Jennings, but declined as he did not want to do another amnesia film after The Bourne Identity (2002).

The film includes several of director Woo's trademarks, including two Mexican standoffs, the appearance of a dove and a birdcage similar to the one seen in 1992's Hard Boiled.

== Reception ==
=== Critical response ===
Rotten Tomatoes gives Paycheck an approval of 27% based on 153 reviews, with an average rating of 4.7/10. The site's critics consensus states, "Though Dick's short story has an intriguing premise, Woo reduces it to a lot of meaningless chases, shoot-outs, and explosions." On Metacritic it has a weighted average score of 43 out of 100 based on 34 critics, indicating "mixed or average reviews". Audiences surveyed by CinemaScore gave the film a grade B− on an A+ to F scale.

Scott Tobias of The A.V. Club gave the film a positive review, calling it a "smart thriller" and praising "Woo's wonderful sense of timing and rhythm." Chris Barsanti of Film Threat also praised Paycheck, calling it "one of the more competent and reassuring action movies to come out for quite some time."

Roger Ebert gave the film two stars (out of four), saying that he "enjoyed the movie" but felt that it "exploits [Philip K. Dick's story] for its action and plot potential, but never really develops it." K. J. Doughton of Film Threat called the film "John Woo lite," and a "neutered variation on his earlier, superior works." James Berardinelli gave the film one-and-a-half stars out of four, calling it "a bad film, complete with lackluster acting, brainless writing, and uninspired direction."

About the movie's reception, John Woo said: "I was fine with the sci-fi in Paycheck because there wasn't too much. I had intended to make an Alfred Hitchcock-style movie out of it, something more about suspense and thrills than guns and shooting, but unfortunately the script wasn't written that way. It didn't work well for the suspense, and it didn't come out the way I wanted it to be, not as Hitchcockian. But at least it was nice working with Ben Affleck."

=== Awards ===
Ben Affleck won a Golden Raspberry Award for Worst Actor for his performance in Paycheck and two others: Gigli and Daredevil. After asking why he did not get his trophy, he was presented the Razzie live on Larry King Live a week later, and promptly broke it. The broken trophy was sold on eBay for enough money to cover the hall rental for the following year's ceremonies. While hosting Saturday Night Live, Ben Affleck joked that he would have walked out of the premiere and asked for his money back until he realized he was in the movie.

== See also ==
- List of adaptations of works by Philip K. Dick
