= Mr. Spaceship =

- Short story by Philip K. Dick
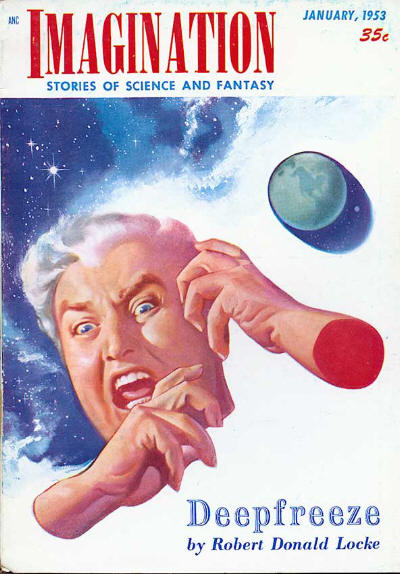
- "Mr. Spaceship" was originally published in the January 1953 issue of Imagination

Publication
- Published in: Imagination
- Published in English: January 1953

"Mr. Spaceship" is a science fiction novelette by American writer Philip K. Dick, first published in Imagination in January 1953, and later in The Collected Stories of Philip K. Dick. It has since been republished several times, including in Beyond Lies the Wub in 1988.

== Plot summary ==
The story is set in the distant future, where humanity is at war with "Yuks", an alien life form which does not use mechanical spaceships nor constructions but instead relies on life forms to power their technology. The war has been going on for a long time and humanity has not been able to come up with a solution against the life-form based ships and mines that the Yuks use. One day a team of researchers led by Philip Kramer decide to build a spaceship which is powered by a human brain and they find the ideal candidate in Kramer's old professor, a dying man who volunteers to donate his brain to the project.

The spaceship is built and on the first test run into outer space the team discovers that the professor made some changes to the ship, giving him—or rather, his brain—full control over the entire ship. Sensing trouble, the team flees the empty ship being piloted by the professor and evacuate into outer space. Later, the spaceship returns and kidnaps Kramer and his wife. On board the ship, the professor's brain informs them that they will be looking for a new planet to colonize to try and start a new and better world. The professor decides on this colonization because he sees no hope in humanity and what he feels it has become: a species which desires, above all else, war.
