= Out in the Garden =

1953 short story by Philip K. Dick

"Out In The Garden" is a science fiction short story by American writer Philip K. Dick, first published in 1953 in the magazine Fantasy Fiction. It has since been republished several times, including in the collections Beyond Lies the Wub in 1988.

== Plot summary ==
The story is about a wife who spends most of her time in the garden with her duck, reading and meditating, while the duck is chasing spiders to eat. Her husband is inside the house all the time. One day, the woman gives birth to their son, and the man, tired of the duck, kills it. A few years later, the man is uncertain whether he is the father of the son, since the boy seems to be in the garden all the time. The boy asks his father if he wants to play with him in the garden, and the father agrees, only to find the boy is eating spiders.
