= The Short Happy Life of the Brown Oxford =

- Short story by Philip K. Dick
- Language: English

Publication
- Published in: The Magazine of Fantasy & Science Fiction
- Publication type: Magazine
- Publisher: Fantasy House, Inc.
- Publication date: January, 1954

"The Short Happy Life of the Brown Oxford" is a science fiction short story by American writer Philip K. Dick, first published in the January, 1954 edition of The Magazine of Fantasy & Science Fiction and later in Beyond Lies the Wub in 1984 and in The Short Happy Life of the Brown Oxford, a collection of Philip K. Dick short stories, in 1990.

== Plot summary ==
The story is told from a first person perspective of a young man and his friend, a scientist named Doc Rupert Labyrinth (also appearing in Dick's short story "The Preserving Machine"), who develops a new device called The Animator, which gives life to otherwise inanimate objects. Doc thinks that the machine does not work, and sells it to the narrator for 5 dollars. The narrator leaves his shoe in the machine, and discovers the following day that the shoe has become alive. Doc and the narrator catch the shoe and stuff it in a drawer, while Doc returns to the university to get his fellow professors to witness the shoe. Meanwhile, the narrator loses the shoe, as it escapes and leaves the house. Shortly later, the shoe returns and uses the Animator to animate a woman's shoe for companionship, and when Doc and his fellow professors, and the press, return, they witness the two shoes, moving across the lawn, disappearing into a hedge.
