= Piper in the Woods =

1953 short story by Philip K. Dick

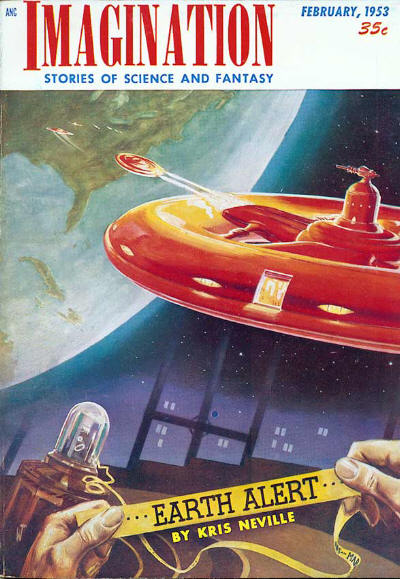
"Piper in the Woods" was originally published in the February 1953 issue of Imagination.

"Piper in the Woods" is a science fiction short story by American writer Philip K. Dick, first published in 1953 in Imagination, and later in The Collected Stories of Philip K. Dick. It has since been republished several times, including in Beyond Lies the Wub in 1988.

== Plot summary ==
Henry Harris, an army doctor at a garrison on Earth is puzzled by a case of a soldier who returns from the asteroid Y-3, and claims that he's a plant. When several more men return from Y-3, each thinking they're a plant, Harris travels to the asteroid to solve the puzzle. He soon finds out that the soldiers claim that a certain indigenous people on the asteroid called "Pipers", who live in the woods, made them realize that they're plants. Harris ventures into the woods and discovers that Pipers do not exist, they were merely invented by the soldiers to cope with the pressure of their jobs. The soldiers relaxed by simply turning into plants, or their minds thought so. Harris returns to earth and contemplates all the work that lies ahead of him. He unpacks his suitcases, which, rather than carrying clothes, contain soil from Y-3. Harris lays the soil on the ground, lies in it like a plant, and goes to sleep.
