= The Indefatigable Frog =

1953 science fiction short story by Philip K. Dick

"The Indefatigable Frog" is a science fiction short story by American writer Philip K. Dick, first published in the July 1953 edition of Fantastic Story Magazine, and later in The Collected Stories of Philip K. Dick. It has since been republished several times, including in Beyond Lies the Wub in 1988.

The story centers around two college professors, Hardy and Grote, who argue about one of Zeno's Paradoxes, called The dichotomy paradox, where a frog wants to get up from a well, but each jump is half of the previous one. That way, Hardy argues, the frog will never exit the well, while Grote argues the opposite: that the frog will eventually escape from the well.

The Dean of the college wants to settle this age-old paradox and instructs the two professors to create an experiment with the frog. Hardy and Grote do exactly that: they send the frog down a large tube and subject it to an energy field which reduces the size of the frog in half for each leap. The frog eventually becomes so small that it disappears. Grote goes into the tube to figure out what happened, while Hardy flicks on the switch, forcing Grote down the tube. Grote is halved in size as he progresses, and the smooth floor of the tube eventually becomes huge rocks and boulders as he nears microscopic size. Grote disappears, and Hardy claims that the frog never made it across and that he was right. In the end, Grote—and the frog—became so small that they passed through the molecules of the tube, away from the field and back to their original size.
