= Stability (short story) =

Short science fiction story by Philip K. Dick (published 1987)

"Stability" is a short science fiction story by Philip K. Dick, first written around 1947, but not published until 1987 in Volume I of The Collected Stories of Philip K. Dick. The story is set in the far future, where civilization never progresses; the government has determined it to have reached its peak, and to prevent declination, society is forcibly kept in a state of "Stability".

== Plot summary ==
Robert Benton, through the use of his gigantic, detachable white wings, leaps off a roof and flies into the darkness of the night sky. He sees many others who are flying in the darkness as well. The others invite him to participate in night races, but he declines. Instead, he continues to move upward into the “higher air”, coasting on air currents until he arrives at the “City of Lightness” where he is summoned to a meeting at the Control Office via a bright “winking” light, which he spots from above and then flies down to meet.

At the Control Office, Benton is informed that a patent application he filed for an invention has been unsuccessful, as the invention could threaten Stability. Benton is surprised, because as far as he was aware he had not filed any such application. Returning home with a set of plans and prototype device given "back" to him by the office, he discovers it to be a time machine.

Activating the device, Benton finds himself transported to an unknown point in history and confronted with what appears to be a living city contained in a glass globe. Despite being warned not to by a mysterious voice claiming to be a "guardian" against evil, Benton feels compelled to take the globe; it then telepathically informs him how to use the machine to return to his own time. Benton does so, but travels to a point in time shortly before he originally left, and deposits his "invention" and the plans at the Control office as a patent application, creating a bootstrap paradox.

After Benton leaves, the Controllers deduce what has happened and go to Benton's home in order to end the threat to Stability. Discovering Benton and the city, one Controller recounts hearing an ancient story of an evil city that had been enclosed in glass for the protection of everyone else. The Controllers attempt to take the globe from Benton, but it breaks, releasing a strange mist, and Benton loses consciousness.

Benton awakes to find himself living in a city where the human inhabitants exist only to service "their Machines". However, neither he nor anyone else has any memory of things being any different; as far as they are aware, life has always been like this.
