= The Crawlers (short story) =

1954 short story by Philip K. Dick

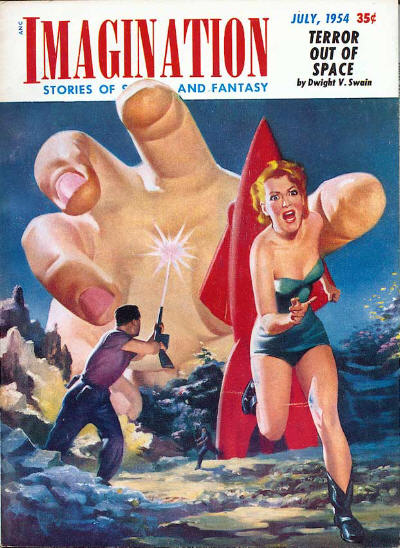
"The Crawlers" was originally published in the July 1954 issue of Imagination

"The Crawlers" is a science fiction short story by American writer Philip K. Dick. Submitted under the title "Foundling Home", it was first published as "The Crawlers" in Imagination magazine, July 1954.

A film adaptation was announced for production by Edward R. Pressman starting in 2014.

== Plot summary ==
The story starts out from the point of view of a crawler constructing one of its curious hives. The crawler seems sentient and to genuinely enjoy building its odd dwelling.

The story is set in a small Midwestern town, with references later in the story to mysterious "pools" which seem to cause mutations. Certain families in the area have begun to give birth to abnormal children – "crawlers" – with long, soft, pale, elongated bodies. They have poisonous stings (one crawler stung a dog, who promptly turned black and hard, and died soon after) and pulpy exteriors, and seem to emit a kind of glue that allows them to build. The crawlers seem to love building, and a colony of survivors, crawlers who were not killed by disgusted parents, have set up a hive not far from the town. A government official proposes a plan to move the crawlers to an island, where they can be alone, unpersecuted and with the ability to build as much as they like.

The story ends the same way it started; from the point of view of a crawler. The crawler mentions how happy the colony is, and that building is progressing quickly. He comments on how the crawlers will soon reach the mainland, and then work will begin in earnest. The story ends, however, on an uncertain note – some of the crawlers have had children, and those children are not crawlers, but "throwbacks" – us.
