= Nanny (short story) =

- Short story by Philip K. Dick
- Country: USA
- Language: English
- Genre: science fiction

Publication
- Published in: Startling Stories
- Publication date: 1955

"Nanny" is a science fiction short story by American writer Philip K. Dick, first published in 1955 in Startling Stories and later in The Book of Philip K. Dick (1973) and The Collected Stories of Philip K. Dick. It has since been republished several times, including in Beyond Lies the Wub in 1988.

== Plot summary ==
The story takes place in the future, when every family has a mechanical robot as a Nanny. A family of four has an older model Nanny, and every night, when the family goes to sleep, the nanny and the neighbor's nanny, which is a different model, meet in the back yard and fight. The Nanny gets damaged and must be repaired, which frustrates the family, as they're advised to upgrade to a newer model.

One day, the kids take the Nanny to the park, where it is attacked and destroyed by another, much larger and more powerful, Nanny. Their father, upset with this, goes and buys a brand new Nanny, the toughest model available. The kids are excited, but later, their new Nanny destroys the Nanny of another family, whose father is forced to buy another Nanny, an even bigger one.

== Adaptation ==
The story was likely the basis for "The People's Choice" story in EC Comics Weird Science comic book and corresponding episode of HBO's Perversions of Science. Although not substantially verifiable, the stories are virtually identical and EC Comics was known for borrowing adaptation ideas.
