= The Pre-Persons =

Short story by Philip K. Dick

"The Pre-Persons" is a science fiction short story by American writer Philip K. Dick. It was first published in Fantasy and Science Fiction magazine, October 1974.

The story was an anti-abortion response to Roe v. Wade. Dick imagines a future where the United States Congress has decided that abortion is legal until the soul enters the body. The specific instant is defined by the administration, at present the moment a person has the ability to perform simple algebraic calculations (around the age of 12).

The main protester – a former Stanford mathematics major – demands to be taken to the abortion center, since he claims to have forgotten all his algebra.
