= The Chromium Fence =

1955 short story by Philip K. Dick

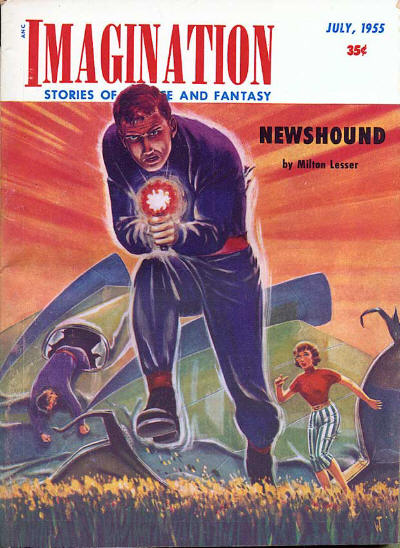
"The Chromium Fence" was originally published in the July 1955 issue of Imagination.

"The Chromium Fence" is a science fiction short story by American writer Philip K. Dick, first published in Imagination magazine in July 1955.

The story is set in a future where political differences have been reduced to trivialities, the "purists" are pitted against the "naturalists". The purists wish to make the adoption of cosmetic changes (sweat glands removed, teeth fixed and so on) compulsory. The purist and naturalist mantra in this story is shown as one extreme manifestation of the brain-washing. The central character, Don Walsh, seems the only sane man left and refuses to join either side. Eventually, however, he is forced to act and pays the ultimate price.

== Publication history ==
This story was never reprinted anywhere after its single appearance in the bottom-market magazine Imagination, until the appearance of Dick's collected stories in 1987.

Dick's agency attempted to sell the story to the New Yorker magazine by describing it as a 'New York story' set in the future.
