= Prize Ship =

1954 short story by Philip K. Dick

"Prize Ship" is a science fiction short story by American writer Philip K. Dick. It was first published in 1954 in Thrilling Wonder Stories and later in The Collected Stories of Philip K. Dick, Volume One: Beyond Lies The Wub and later trade editions of the collected stories.

== Plot summary ==
The story is set several hundred years into the future, when a space portal vital to Earth's colonies in the far reaches of space is taken over by the hostile species Ganymedes, who threaten to blow it up unless Earth starts paying them a tax on everything that passes through the portal. Earth ponders whether to go to war with them, but they manage to capture a Ganymedean space ship, which they think can help them in the upcoming war.

A group of four military and scientists take the ship, which resembles a globe, on a test run, and find themselves in a foreign land which looks like Earth. They encounter people living there, who are a few inches tall, and live in miniature society. The crew goes back to the ship, and sets the instruments to take them the opposite way, there they find themselves in a world where humans are a lot larger than them, and barely make it back to Earth. They conclude that the space ship is useless, and decide to hand it back to the Ganymedes, who reveal to them that it is in fact not a space ship, but a time machine. The scientists conclude that the observed differences in size were caused by the expanding universe.

== Expanding Universe ==
The fanciful abuse of the concept of expanding universe that has ordinary objects such as human beings, horses and buildings becoming larger over time, instead of its usual meaning that certain celestial objects become more distant from each other over time, is also used in the later short story "Prominent Author".
