= The Little Movement =

1952 fantasy short story by Philip K. Dick

"The Little Movement" is a fantasy short story by American writer Philip K. Dick, first published in 1952 in The Magazine of Fantasy & Science Fiction, and later in The Collected Stories of Philip K. Dick. It has since been republished several times, including in Beyond Lies the Wub in 1988, and in 2003 in Paycheck.

The plot centers around a group of toys who plan on taking over the world, but are having trouble with adults, so they mainly focus on children. The story follows a boy whose father buys him a toy robot called My Lord, who instructs the boy to keep silent of its plan and to go to Don's Toyland and pick up a shipment of toy guns and tanks. However, the boy's current toys, led by a teddy bear and a rabbit, spoil The Lord's plan, and it is revealed that the teddy bear and the Boy's current toys have destroyed several robots like The Lord, who were sent from "The Factory", to take over their child owners.
