= Roog (story) =

1951 science fiction short story by American writer Philip K. Dick

"Roog" is a science fiction short story by American writer Philip K. Dick. It was his first sold work, although not his first published story.

== Plot summary ==
"Roog" is a story told from the point of view of a dog named Boris, who observes his masters carefully storing food in containers outside of their house day after day. Unbeknownst to the dog, these are the humans' garbage cans. The dog is later horrified to witness some food being "stolen" by garbage men who the dog believes are predatory carnivores from another planet. The dog comes to know these beings as "Roogs', and tries to warn his master of each "theft" with cries of "Roog! Roog!" The humans, unable to comprehend the hound's message, think the dog is just being rowdy. Thus, they attribute the sound the dog makes to be the sound that all dogs make when they are excited, "Roog! Roog!" The tale concludes with the animal being somewhat distraught, barking "ROOG!" very loudly at the garbage men before they make off once more with trash in their garbage truck.

== Publication ==
The inspiration for Boris, the dog in "Roog", was based on a real dog named Snooper, who belonged to one of Dick's neighbors. Snooper would become very alarmed every time the garbage men arrived to pick up trash, and this inspired Dick to write the short story.

"Roog" was written in November 1951 and appeared in The Magazine of Fantasy & Science Fiction (February 1953, page 123) without illustrations. During this time Dick worked in a record store. In an essay prefacing a collection of his short stories published in 1978, Dick recalled the story's gestation, as well as discussing its plot, its general themes and his reaction at the time. Dick relates that he contacted Anthony Boucher, a sci-fi/fantasy publisher, editor and fellow writer whom Dick recalls as a kind friend. Dick wrote, "Without [Boucher's] help I'd still be in the record business. I mean that very seriously." As a young man, Dick was very pleased with the publication, and wondered if he could quit his job at the record store and work full-time as an author, while the older Dick (27 years on) dismissed that aspiration as delusional.

Soon after the original publication of "Roog", Boucher attempted to get it published once more, in a science fiction anthology being compiled by a person Dick refers to as "Ms. J.M." (Judith Merrill Interview with Lupoff). However, she disliked the story, finding it obscure and hard to understand. She also criticized Dick's description of the garbage men as inaccurate, apparently unable to see that the description is from the protagonist dog's perspective. Despite Dick explaining the story in a letter to J.M. regarding the themes of the work, she rejected the story. Boucher, however, proceeded to publish it, and it remains in print, at one time even appearing in a high school literature textbook.

== Reception ==
Dick regarded Roog as "quite a serious story". Dick explained in the introduction to The Collected Stories of Philip K. Dick that "Roog" "tells of fear, it tells of loyalty, it tells of obscure menace and a good creature who cannot convey knowledge of that menace to those he loves". Furthermore, Aaron Barlow suggests an insightful connection of the story to the nature and themes of his writings:

By the end of "Roog," however, Dick has encouraged speculation that the "garbagemen" really might be aliens held off by dogs the aliens call "Guardians.”

Boris faces two problems. First, though he barks that "Roogs" are coming, no one understands. He cannot communicate his warning. Second, his "Roogs" may be a delusion instead of a real danger. Boris cannot tell which; he doesn't even know that he could, in fact, be wrong. He has seen the paperboy and barked at him, taking him, without any evidence, as a Roog. [...]

Dick gives no hint of any "truth" behind Boris's subjective perceptions. Whatever the case, Boris's inability to communicate his concern leaves the matter moot and leads him to fear the breakdown of his world of suburban dog-life—and leads Dick to think about Boris's situation in human terms. [...]

As a dog, Boris views the human world through the blanket distortion of canine point-of-view. Yet what he sees subjectively may be "real" — just as it may be a mask or a deception created through his own limited perceptual abilities. That these "may"s exist concerned Dick a great deal. Perhaps the blanket distortion of human point-of-view makes experience as difficult for us to decipher as for Boris.

Perhaps Boris, finally, is something like the poor fantasy writer no one listens to. Like, hmm, Phil Dick. Like any struggler for communication, particularly for communication that transcends individual, varied perception.
