= Upon the Dull Earth =

1954 short story by Philip K. Dick

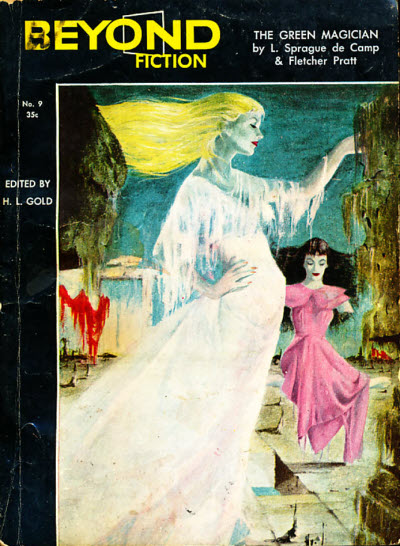
- "Upon the Dull Earth" was originally published in the November 1954 issue of Beyond.
- Author: Philip K. Dick
- Genre: fantasy
- Publication date: 1954

"Upon the Dull Earth" is a fantasy short story by American writer Philip K. Dick, first published in November 1954 in Beyond Fantasy Fiction.

Both the title and the protagonist's name are taken from Shakespeare's The Two Gentlemen of Verona, Act IV, scene ii:

Then to Silvia let us sing,

That Silvia is excelling;

She excels each mortal thing

Upon the dull earth dwelling;

To her let us garlands bring

— William Shakespeare, The Two Gentlemen of Verona

== Plot summary ==
By offering up the blood of a lamb, Silvia, the protagonist of "Upon the Dull Earth," is able to summon creatures she identifies as angels. She thinks that the creatures are her ancestors, and she is sure that one day she will join them. At the same time, though, it is not clear whether the creatures are really good, as Silvia thinks, or wicked. Their behavior and their relation with Silvia scare the girl's relatives and Rick, her boyfriend. Rick thinks that Silvia's behavior is very dangerous, as "the white-winged giants ... can sear [her] to ash". During a quarrel with Rick, the girl accidentally cuts herself. Unwillingly, Silvia's blood summons the creatures. Unable to control their power, the angel-like giants burn Silvia's body and leave only "a brittle burned-out husk".

Unable to accept his lover's death, Rick tries to bring Silvia back. He manages to contact the light-creatures who apparently belong to a higher realm of being and he manages to speak with Silvia. The girl now lives in the realm of the angel-like creatures, but she wants to come back and she explains that they made a mistake when they took her away. The creatures think that bringing Silvia back could be dangerous. Besides, Silvia explains that in order to come back she needs "some shape to enter" because there are no "material forms" in the higher continuum. She would have to take something from the human world, "something of clay".

Silvia manages to come back, but the effects of her return are disastrous. As soon as she appears in front of Rick, Silvia realizes that something has gone wrong and that she has taken the place of someone else. In fact, she has taken her sister's body. There is a scene in which Rick sees Betty Lou (Silvia's sister) change and become Silvia, but it is just the beginning of the nightmare atmosphere which engulfs the story's ending. In fact, the process of transformation is not over. Slowly, every member of Silvia's family becomes Silvia. Rick runs away in fright. The girl has assumed the role of a revenant who invades the body and mind of any living person and spreads like a virus, a curse. After a useless flight, after he has seen service-station attendants, waitresses and common people change into Silvia before his very eyes, Rick looks at himself in a mirror and sees his face slowly becoming Silvia's. Suddenly, the man is gone and only Silvia remains. The girl finds herself alone and does not understand what has happened.

== Adaptations ==
"Upon the Dull Earth" was adapted into an audio drama, "Silvia's Blood", by The Truth.
