= Breakfast at Twilight =

- Short story by Philip K. Dick
- Country: United States
- Language: English
- Genre(s): Science fiction short story

Publication
- Published in: Amazing Stories
- Publication type: Periodical
- Media type: Print
- Publication date: July 1954

"Breakfast at Twilight" is a science fiction short story by American writer Philip K. Dick. It was received by the Scott Meredith Literary Agency on January 17, 1953 and first published in Amazing Stories, July 1954. It appears in the second volume reprint of Philip K. Dick's short stories Second Variety.

== Plot ==
After experiencing a terrifying explosion, a middle-class American family finds their home in the middle of a wasteland. American soldiers burst in looking for survivors and supplies, under the family's amazed and frightened eyes. The soldiers are just as surprised, finding the home filled with items that are no longer available, and carrying away their food, along with various other unconstitutional acts.

The soldiers explain that their home is one of the few to survive the ongoing nuclear war, which is now largely automated with underground factories on both sides of the conflict building missiles and destroying the other country square by square. The soldiers and family soon realize the home is out of its own time continuum, apparently having been blasted into the future by the force of the bombs. They find that the date is not long in the future; the war escalated to nuclear exchange shortly after the time they left.

The soldiers tell the family a second wave of missiles will be arriving, intended to destroy anything that survived the first wave, and offer to take the family into a shelter. After some discussion, they refuse, considering it better to chance that the second wave will blast them back to their own time than live in this largely lifeless future.

The gambit succeeds and the family finds themselves in their own time, but with their house destroyed. Neighbors rush to the home, where the father, Tim McLean, agrees that the problem was an exploding central heating system. Then he comments, "I should have got it fixed ... I should have had it looked at a long time ago. Before it got in such bad shape ... before it was too late", a metaphor for the start of the war which may now be unavoidable.

== Reception ==
Reviewer Steven Owen Godersky proclaimed in his review that "Phil Dick's third major theme is his fascination with war and his fear and hatred of it. One hardly sees critical mention of it, yet it is as integral to his body of work as oxygen is to water."
