= The Builder (short story) =

1953 short story by Philip K. Dick

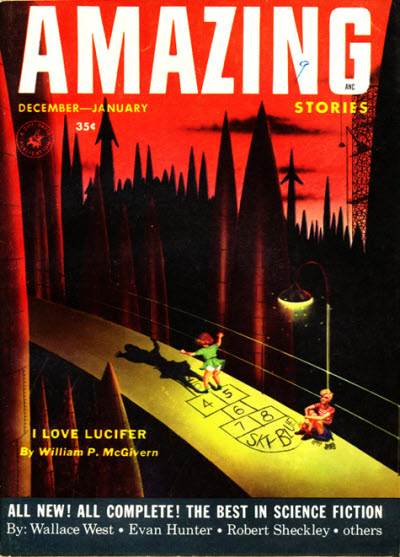
"The Builder" was originally published in the December 1953 issue of Amazing Stories

"The Builder" is a science fiction short story by American writer Philip K. Dick. It was first published in the magazine Amazing Stories, in December, 1953-January 1954, with illustration by Ed Emshwiller. Dick had submitted many short stories to magazines and made approximately fifteen sales before becoming a client of the Scott Meredith Literary Agency. This was his first SMLA submission, received by SMLA on July 23, 1952. His second SMLA submission was Meddler, received by SMLA on July 24, 1952. The SMLA file card for "The Builder" shows it was submitted to mainstream magazines The Atlantic Monthly and Harper's before it was submitted to Amazing Stories and has an SMLA sub-agent's notation, "IT ISN'T SCIENCE FICTION".

== Plot summary ==
The story centers around a man named Elwood living with his family in 1950s suburbia. He builds a boat in his back yard, to great annoyance to his wife and neighbors. When they ask him why he builds it, he tells them he doesn't know. Elwood exhibits post traumatic stress disorder, and shuns most people around him, including his family and co-workers. One day, he decides to go home in the middle of his job to work on the boat. He gazes at the boat, wondering why he's building it. As it starts raining, he finally realizes why.

== Reception ==
According to Steven Owen Godersky: "Phil Dick's third major theme is his fascination with war and his fear and hatred of it. One hardly sees critical mention of it, yet it is as integral to his body of work as oxygen is to water."
