= Beyond Lies the Wub =

Short story by Philip K. Dick

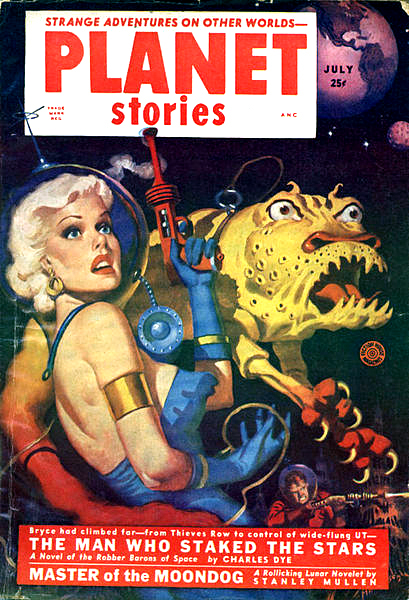
July 1952 issue of Planet Stories

"Beyond Lies the Wub" is a science fiction short story by American writer Philip K. Dick. It was his first published genre story, originally appearing in Planet Stories in July 1952. It was first collected in The Preserving Machine in 1969, and was included in The Best of Philip K. Dick in 1977. It was the title story for the first volume of the original edition of Dick's collected stories. Translations of "Beyond Lies the Wub" have appeared in Dutch, French, German, Italian, Polish and Spanish; and the story has been included in more than a dozen anthologies.

== Plot ==
Peterson, a crew member of a spaceship loading up with food animals on Mars, buys an enormous pig-like creature known as a "wub" from a native just before departure. Franco, his captain, is worried about the extra weight but seems more concerned about its taste, as his ship is short of food. However, after takeoff, the crew realizes that the wub is a very intelligent creature, capable of telepathy and maybe even mind control.

Peterson and the wub spend time discussing mythological figures and the travels of Odysseus. Captain Franco, paranoid after an earlier confrontation with the Wub which left him temporarily paralyzed, bursts in and insists on killing and eating the wub. The crew becomes very much opposed to killing the sensitive creature after it makes a plea for understanding, but Franco still makes a meal out of him. At the dinner table, Captain Franco apologises for the "interruption" and resumes the earlier conversation between Peterson and the Wub - which now has apparently taken over the Captain's body.

== Reception and analysis ==
"Beyond Lies the Wub" was Dick's first published genre story, originally appearing in Planet Stories in July 1952.

Brian M. Stableford observed that this story "already encapsulated the whimsical paranoia that characterizes almost all his work in the genre". Richard Bleiler likewise concurred that the story was indicative of "the direction that his career was to take".

== References in other works ==
The theme of the Wub was revisited by Dick in his later short story "Not by Its Cover" (1968), which has been described as a "loose sequel" to the 1952 story.

In The Zap Gun the image of a "Venusian wub" is used in a maze game as a creature trapped in a maze to which the player becomes telepathically and empathically connected.
