= The King of the Elves =

- Short story by Philip K. Dick
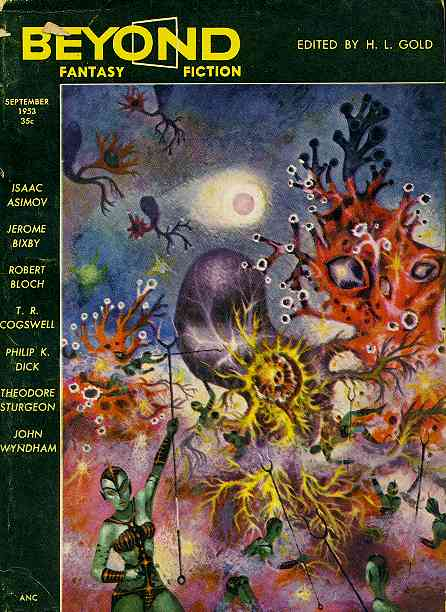
- Language: English
- Genre: Fantasy

Publication
- Published in: Beyond Fantasy Fiction
- Publication type: Magazine
- Publisher: H. L. Gold
- Publication date: September 1953
- Publication place: United States

"The King of the Elves" is a fantasy short story by American writer Philip K. Dick, first published in the September 1953 issue of Beyond Fantasy Fiction.

== Plot summary ==
Shadrach Jones is an old man who owns and runs a gas station in the fictional town of Derryville, Colorado, along an old highway fallen into disrepair due to it having been replaced by a modern interstate highway. One night he counts the money he made that day and realizes that although his income is meager, it is enough to sustain a humble lifestyle that suits him. He then looks outside and sees sickly elves standing in the rain in front of his store. He invites them inside his home to comfort them and learns that they are an army with their king, who is ill and needs rest. They tell him that they are at war with trolls. Shadrach allows them to sleep in his bedroom while he sleeps in his living room.

During the night, Shadrach feels foolish for believing in the existence of elves, and goes to check on them. He finds that the King of the Elves has died in his bed, but his last command to his subjects was that they should make Shadrach the new King of the Elves and have him lead them into battle against the trolls. Shadrach looks in the mirror and sees his aged face; immediately he thinks to tell his friend Phineas Judd of his royal status. The next day Shadrach tells Phineas that he is king, and by the end of the day the local community has all heard this news. Away from Shadrach, they question among themselves whether he actually believes that he is king, and why he would say this, and whether he is trying to get more customers for his gas station.

That night, a messenger elf comes to Shadrach and tells him that he must help his staff develop battle plans against the trolls at a meeting tonight under the oak tree on Phineas’ property. Shadrach thinks of his dinner, of being ready to serve customers the next day, and of the opinions of his human peers, and suggests that the elf choose a different person to be king. Still, he commits to attend the meeting. When he goes to attend at the appointed time the cold weather bothers him and on the way he passes Phineas at his home. When Phineas invites him inside for a short while, Shadrach gets comfortable inside and forgets his commitment as they reflect on their long friendship. At Phineas' advice, Shadrach decides to return home to be warm and comfortable. As Phineas takes Shadrach outside, Shadrach realizes in the moonlight that Phineas is an inhuman, beastly troll.

Phineas attacks Shadrach as legions of trolls pour from the shadows. Shadrach calls for help and fights the trolls as best he can while elves rush to his rescue. In the end, Shadrach has fought effectively and killed many trolls, including Phineas. The elves reveal that Phineas was the Great Troll, and are awed that he has been defeated. With the trolls routed, Shadrach expresses a desire to return to his life as a gas station attendant, and the elves respect this. But after seeing his dilapidated home and gas station, he reconsiders and accepts being King of the Elves.

== Possible film adaptation ==
In April 2008, Walt Disney Animation Studios announced a 3D animated feature film adaptation, titled King of the Elves. The film was originally to have been directed by Aaron Blaise and Robert Walker (directors of Brother Bear), and produced by Chuck Williams.

Originally slated for release in 2012, the film was reported as shelved in December 2009. By July 2010, King of the Elves had gone back into development and it was being directed by Chris Williams, director of Bolt. About a year into Williams' effort, he decided that this was not the film he wanted to make and left the project.
