= Colony (novelette) =

1953 short story by Philip K. Dick

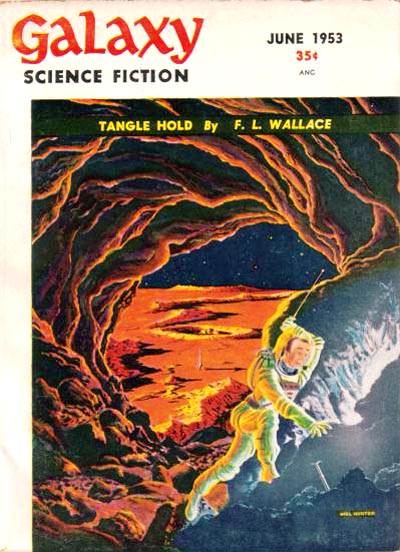
"Colony" was originally published in the June 1953 issue of Galaxy Science Fiction.

"Colony" is a science fiction novelette by American writer Philip K. Dick. It was first published in Galaxy magazine, June 1953. The plot centers on an expedition to an uncharted planet, on which the dominant, predatory alien life form is capable of precise mimicry of all kinds of objects. The size and complexity of the mimicked object can vary from simple doormats to whole spaceships with the larger objects usually attempting to trap and "absorb" humans, similar to carnivorous plants.

The story was adapted for radio for the series X Minus One, airing on October 10, 1956.

== Plot ==
Major Lawrence Hall and Lieutenant Friendly are in a laboratory on an foreign planet called Planet Blue. After three weeks on the planet, they have determined that there are absolutely no harmful life forms, bacteria, pathogens, or pests there. The planet appears completely pure, harmonious, and untouched, almost like the Garden of Eden. Both of them worry that humans would ruin this idyllic place through deforestation, pollution, and destruction. After Friendly leaves the lab and Hall continues working alone, something unexpected happens: The microscope suddenly comes to life and tries to kill Hall. Hall manages to destroy the microscope with his last ounce of strength. Hall then goes to a room where Commander Stella Morrison is holding a meeting about the planet’s future use.

After Morrison reprimands him for breaking the rules by interrupting the conference, and Wood wonders if he's drunk, Lieutenant Friendly becomes concerned. Hall hoarsely orders Friendly to follow him to the lab immediately. Back in the laboratory, Friendly tries to figure out what's got Hall so upset. When Hall points to his microscope, Friendly is surprised to find that the device has vanished without a trace. Hall claims to have destroyed the microscope. Friendly suspects it’s a prank. He bends down and pulls Hall’s very own microscope out of a black plastic box under the lab table; undamaged and in its usual spot.

Hall notices the familiar notch on the fine-tuning knob and the slightly bent clamp on the stage. He touches it cautiously and is left puzzled: Just a few minutes ago, Hall had blasted it; now it stands before him, completely intact. Concerned for Hall’s mental health, Friendly suggests a psychological test. The analysis reveals a severe mental disorder and instability. Back in his quarters, he doubts his own sanity, but then remembers that after the incident he detected metallic particles in the air of the lab; proof that he must indeed have fired at something.

To calm himself down, Hall takes a shower. When he reaches for a towel after his shower, it, too, comes to life: It wraps itself around his wrist, pulls him against the wall, and presses itself over his mouth and nose to suffocate him. Hall struggles desperately, causing the towel to suddenly let go of him; he falls to the floor and loses consciousness. After Hall regains consciousness and begins to get dressed, his belt comes to life. It constricts around his waist like a constrictor snake, trying to crush him. Only when Hall reaches for his blaster does the belt let go. Hall sits down, exhausted, on a chair, but its armrests immediately close around him as well. Since he’s already holding the blaster, he fires six shots at it until the chair goes limp and releases him.

Utterly exhausted, Hall goes to see Commander Stella Morrison. Morrison confronts him with the data from the Psyche Tester, which confirms his severe instability. Hall decides to tell her the truth: He tells her about the microscope, the towel, the belt, and the chair. He suspects that this might be the dangerous characteristic of the planet they’ve been searching for. Morrison doesn’t believe a word of it and has Hall arrested instead. Morrison explains that his experiences must be classified as psychotic delusions and that, for his own safety and that of everyone else, he will be placed under the custody of Captain Taylor until he can be sent back to Earth for evaluation. When he reaches Taylor’s office, accompanied by two guards, he is met with a horrific sight: Captain Taylor is lying on the floor, in danger of suffocating. A red-and-white rug has wrapped itself tightly around his body and is constricting him ever more tightly. At the last moment, he manages to free Taylor and render the rug harmless.

Hall immediately contacts Commander Morrison, whereupon a general alarm is declared for the entire base. Later, four ordinary, harmless objects are found on Morrison’s desk: the microscope, the towel, the belt, and the red-and-white rug. Hall explains that this is the most puzzling aspect of the situation: All four items had previously been completely destroyed by the blaster, yet they are now back in their places, intact, and all laboratory analyses show them to be entirely ordinary, inorganic, and stable objects. Hall ultimately concludes that it wasn’t the real objects that attacked them, but something else that simply looked exactly like those objects. At the same time, further attacks, this time fatal, occur aboard the base, involving Lieutenant Dodds and Lieutenant Fulton.

It is now clear to Hall that this is an organic life form that perfectly mimics objects much like a chameleon does for camouflage. Hall also speculates that it might be a kind of infinitely divisible protoplasm. Although the creatures can be killed with blasters—five or six have already been destroyed—it is impossible to search the entire base. A widespread extermination agent (a poison or corrosive substance for spraying) is needed, just as humanity once used against the mimicry snails on Venus. The constant threat is fraying everyone’s nerves, while at the same time the death toll continues to rise. To destroy the creatures once and for all and prevent them from spreading to other planets, Hall plans to release highly toxic gas throughout the entire laboratory. He suspects that the concentration of the creatures is highest in the laboratory, since all the original samples were brought here and the infiltration began in this very place. After the gas is released, seemingly normal objects throughout the room begin to melt and lose their shape: A specimen cabinet liquefies into a gelatinous mass and slides off the table onto the floor. Bunsen burners, glass flasks, test tube racks, and chemical shelves melt together.

A large glass bell jar falls to the ground in front of Hall as a mushy lump. He can clearly make out the cell nucleus, the cell wall, and the vacuoles in the cytoplasm these are gigantic, individual cells. Since the gas supplies are insufficient to clean the entire base, Morrison suggests requesting reinforcements to clear the entire planet with poison gas and destroy all life forms even if only a dead world remains afterward. Morrison contacts a nearby spaceship under the command of Captain Daniel Davis. To prevent the creatures from boarding the ship disguised as objects, they decide on radical measures: Since the creatures apparently can only mimic inorganic matter (such as clothing, belts, or boots), the entire crew is to leave the planet completely naked and without any equipment or personal belongings. Captain Daniel Davis finally lands on the planet and opens the airlock, but no one comes out. In reality, the base’s crew had already boarded a spaceship shortly before but it turned out to be one of the creatures.

== Background ==
In 1976, Dick said:

The ultimate in paranoia is not when everyone is against you but when everything is against you. Instead of "My boss is plotting against me," it would be "My boss's phone is plotting against me." Objects sometimes seem to possess a will of their own anyhow, to the normal mind; they don't do what they're supposed to do, they get in the way, they show an unnatural resistance to change. In this story I tried to figure out a situation which would rationally explain the dire plotting of objects against humans, without reference to any deranged state on the part of the humans. I guess you'd have to go to another planet. The ending of this story is the ultimate victory of a plotting object over innocent people.
