= Expendable (short story) =

Short story by Philip K. Dick

"Expendable" is a science fiction short story by American writer Philip K. Dick. It was first published in The Magazine of Fantasy and Science Fiction issue of July 1953. The plot centers on an unnamed human being caught in the middle of the ongoing, million year conflict between the degenerate descendants of the insects (Earth's original inhabitants) and humans (the invading species).

Dick later explained where the inspiration for the story came from: "I got the idea when a fly buzzed by my head one day and I imagined (paranoia indeed!) that it was laughing at me."
