= The Preserving Machine (short story) =

1953 short story by Philip K. Dick

"The Preserving Machine" is a science fiction short story by American writer Philip K. Dick. It was first published in the June 1953 issue of Magazine of Fantasy and Science Fiction, and is included in a later collection of the same name, The Preserving Machine.

"The Preserving Machine" was originally a companion piece to another Doc Labyrinth story, "Left Shoe, My Foot", later published as "The Short Happy Life of the Brown Oxford".

== Plot summary ==
Doc Labyrinth fears for the safety of the fragile works of high culture, particularly classical music, in the event of the apocalypse. Accordingly, he orders a machine to be built that will transform musical scores into animals capable of surviving and defending themselves on their own. The machine successfully transforms several composers' works into various animals-- Bach pieces into little beetles, Schubert songs into a lamb-like creature, and so forth. The Doctor, joyful at his success, releases them into the world; but when he finds them later, he finds that they have undergone evolution—they have grown claws, stingers, and fed on one another. When the Bach beetles are fed back into the machine, the resultant musical scores have also changed, become wild and chaotic, with all their beauty and harmony lost.

== See also ==
- The Gold Bug Variations
- The Xenotext
