= Meddler (short story) =

Science fiction short story by Philip K. Dick

"Meddler" is a science fiction short story by American writer Philip K. Dick. It was first published in Future Science Fiction, October 1954 with illustration by Virgil Finlay. Dick had submitted many short stories to magazines and made approximately fifteen sales before becoming a client of the Scott Meredith Literary Agency. This was his second SMLA submission, received by SMLA on July 24, 1952. His first SMLA submission was The Builder, received by SMLA on July 23, 1952.

== Synopsis ==
A government Council illegally makes Time Dips into the future with escalation of adverse consequences following each time-dip. The protagonist, Hasten, is sent in a Time Car as a last-ditch attempt to learn how this meddling worked its destructive force and how to correct the problem. Hasten eventually learns his return trip is apparently the ultimate cause.

== About the story ==
In 1978, Dick said about "Meddler":

Within the beautiful lurks the ugly; you can see in this rather crude story the germ of my whole theme that nothing is what it seems. This story should be read as a trial run on my part; I was just beginning to grasp that obvious form and latent form are not the same thing. As Heraclitus said in fragment 54: “Latent structure is master of obvious structure,” and out of this comes the later more sophisticated Platonic dualism between the phenomenal world and the real but invisible realm of forms lying behind it. I may be reading too much into this simple-minded early story, but at least I was beginning to see in a dim way what I later saw so clearly; in fragment 123, Heraclitus said, “The nature of things is in the habit of concealing itself,” and therein lies it all.
