= Paycheck (novelette) =

1953 science fiction novelette by Philip K. Dick

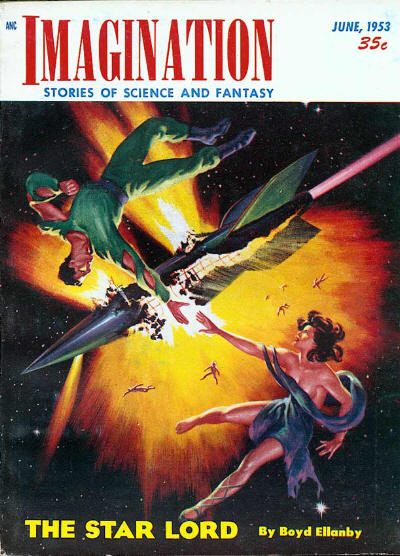
"Paycheck" was originally published in the June 1953 issue of Imagination.

"Paycheck" is a science fiction novelette by American writer Philip K. Dick, written on July 31, 1952 and first published in the June 1953 issue of Imagination. The story was later made, with various alterations, into the film Paycheck in 2003 directed by John Woo and starring Ben Affleck.

== Plot summary ==
Jennings, a talented electronic engineer, has accepted a secret contract with Rethrick Construction. The terms of the contract state that he will work for two years on a secret project after which he will have his memory of the time erased and will be paid an inordinate sum. It is implied that this type of working contract has replaced non-disclosure agreements in business and is commonplace. He wakes up to find that during his tenure he decided to forgo the payment of money and instead receive an envelope of trinkets. Rethrick states that this in itself is not unusual and that people often change their mind as to their method of payment during the course of contracts.

Soon after exiting the building he discovers that in the two years he has forgotten, America has become a police state—he is seized by the Security Police who want to know what Rethrick is doing. One of the trinkets he received as payment enables his escape from the police. Jennings soon realizes that the only way to secure his safety is to blackmail Rethrick as to who will be able to shield him from the government. Using several more of the trinkets, he is able to make his way back to Rethrick's hidden facility. He has also realized that during his tenure at Rethrick Industries he worked on a machine that allowed people to view the future and the trinkets are part of a carefully crafted plan to ensure his survival.

When he finally enters Rethrick's complex, it dawns on him that there is much more going on than the construction of an illegal device that can show the future. Rethrick is building an army to support a revolution which would free the country from the oppressive government. The story concludes with Jennings successfully blackmailing Rethrick into allowing him to join the company in a partner-like capacity.

The trinkets that Jennings received as payment are as follows:

- A length of fine wire (allows him to short out and open the door of a police car)
- A bus token (allows him to quickly board a bus and escape the Security Police)
- A ticket stub (tells him where Rethrick's building is)
- A green strip of cloth (a worker's armband, enabling him to enter Rethrick's building)
- A code key (opens a rear exit from Rethrick's building)
- Half of a broken poker chip (permits entry to a gambling den where he hides from both the Company and the police)
- A parcel receipt (permits access to material stored in a bank that allows him to blackmail Rethrick into protecting him from the government)

== Critical analysis ==
Dick said of the story: "How much is a key to a bus locker worth? One day it's worth 25 cents, the next day thousands of dollars. In this story I got to thinking that there are times in our lives when having a dime to make a phone call spells the difference between life and death. Keys, small change, maybe a theater ticket -- how about a parking receipt for a Jaguar? All I had to do was link this idea up with time travel to see how the small and useless, under the wise eyes of a time traveler, might signify a great deal more. He would know when that dime might save your life. And, back in the past again, he might prefer that dime to any amount of money, no matter how large."

Critic Zack Handlen remarked, "This is still early Dick, which means that while interesting concepts are introduced, and there’s some play with identity -- Jennings develops an overwhelming faith in the prescience of his past self, a faith which most people can’t ever have in their present versions, and by the end he’s even referring to that past guy as a separate person -- the primary focus is nabbing you and keeping you entertained. ... A solid piece of work all around."

== See also ==
- Drug-induced amnesia § In popular culture
- Mind control in popular culture
