= Planet Stories =

20th-century American pulp science fiction magazine

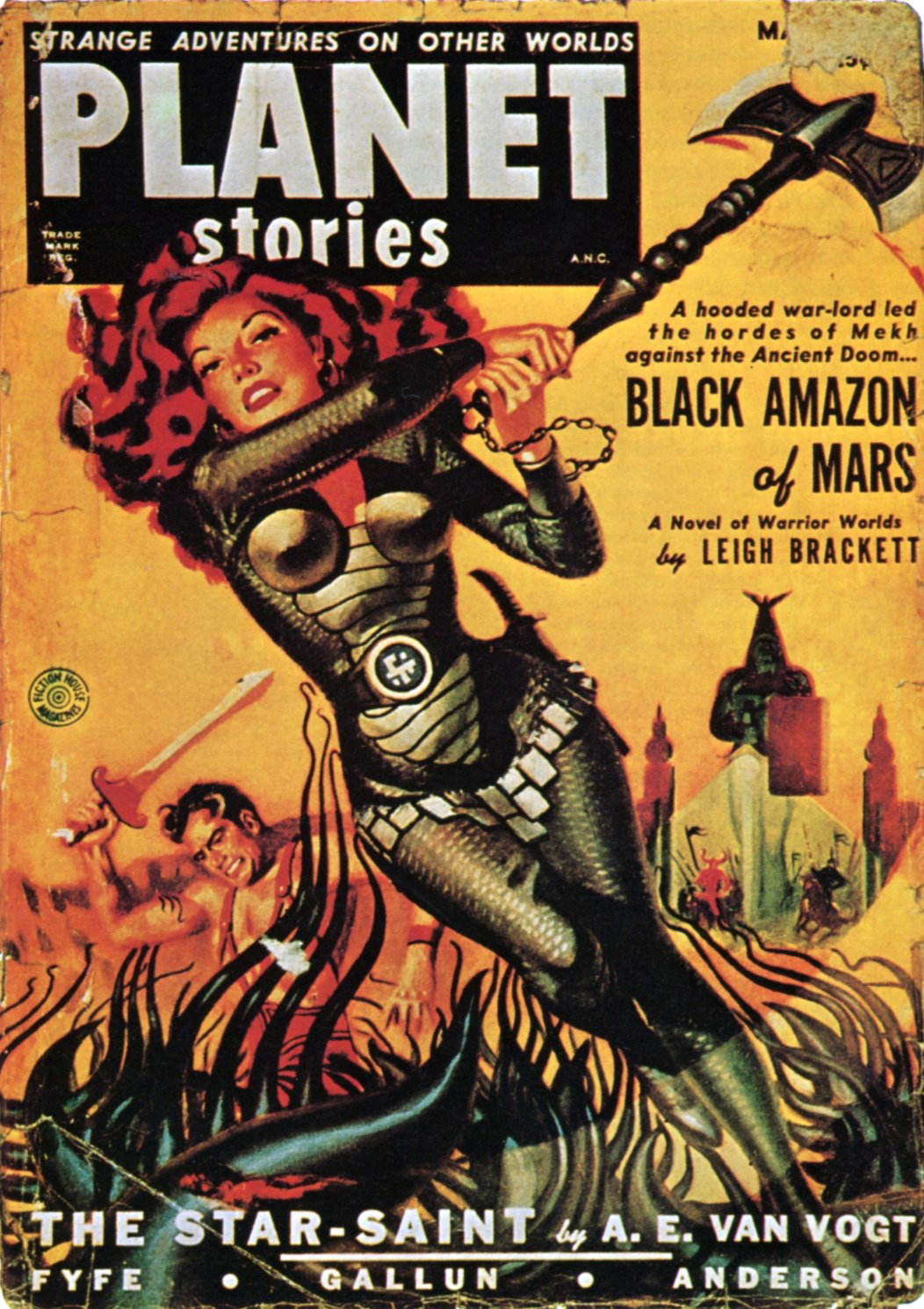
The March 1951 issue of Planet Stories; art by Allen Anderson

Planet Stories was an American pulp science fiction magazine, published by Fiction House between 1939 and 1955. It featured interplanetary adventures, both in space and on some other planets, and was initially focused on a young readership. Malcolm Reiss was editor or editor-in-chief for all of its 71 issues. Planet Stories was launched at the same time as Planet Comics, the success of which probably helped to fund the early issues of Planet Stories. Planet Stories did not pay well enough to regularly attract the leading science fiction writers of the day, but occasionally obtained work from well-known authors, including Isaac Asimov and Clifford D. Simak. In 1952 Planet Stories published Philip K. Dick's first sale, and printed four more of his stories over the next three years.

The two writers most identified with Planet Stories are Leigh Brackett and Ray Bradbury, both of whom set many of their stories on a romanticized version of Mars that owed much to the depiction of Barsoom in the works of Edgar Rice Burroughs. Bradbury's work for Planet included an early story in his Martian Chronicles sequence. Brackett's best-known work for the magazine was a series of adventures featuring Eric John Stark, which began in the summer of 1949. Brackett and Bradbury collaborated on one story, "Lorelei of the Red Mist", which appeared in 1946; it was generally well-received, although one letter to the magazine complained that the story's treatment of sex, though mild by modern standards, was too explicit. The artwork also emphasized attractive women, with a scantily clad damsel in distress or alien princess on almost every cover.

== Publication history ==
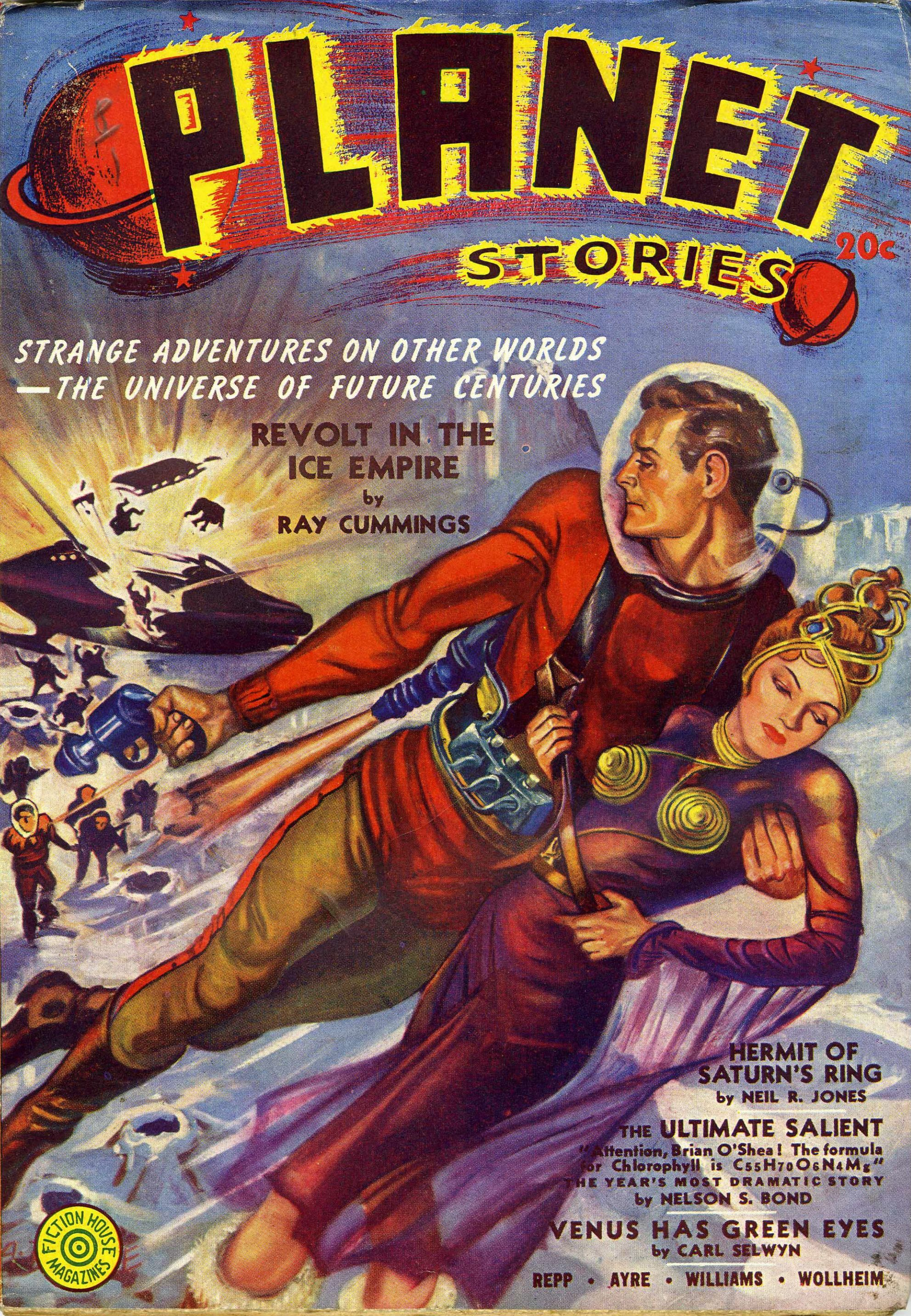
The Fall 1940 issue of Planet Stories; art by Albert Drake

Although science fiction (sf) had been published before the 1920s, it did not begin to coalesce into a separately marketed genre until the appearance in 1926 of Amazing Stories, a pulp magazine published by Hugo Gernsback. By the end of the 1930s the field was undergoing its first boom. Fiction House, a major pulp publisher, had run into difficulties during the Depression, but after a relaunch in 1934 found success with detective and romance pulp titles. Fiction House's first title with sf interest was Jungle Stories, which was launched in early 1939; it was not primarily a science fiction magazine, but often featured storylines with marginally science fictional themes, such as survivors from Atlantis. At the end of 1939, Fiction House decided to add an sf magazine to its lineup; it was titled Planet Stories, and was published by Love Romances, a subsidiary company that had been created to publish Fiction House's romance titles. The first issue was dated Winter 1939. Two comics were launched at the same time: Jungle Comics and Planet Comics; both were published monthly, whereas Planet Stories was quarterly, and it is quite likely that the success of the comics funded the early issues of the pulps.

Malcolm Reiss edited Planet Stories from the beginning, and retained editorial oversight and control throughout its run, though he was not always the named editor on the masthead; when other editors were involved, his title was "managing editor". The first of these sub-editors was Wilbur S. Peacock, who took over with the Fall 1942 issue and remained until Fall 1945, after which he was replaced by Chester Whitehorn for three issues, and then by Paul L. Payne, from Fall 1946 to Spring 1950.

With the Summer 1950 issue the editorship passed to Jerome Bixby, who was already editing Jungle Stories. Soon thereafter Planet Stories switched from a quarterly to bimonthly schedule. Bixby lasted a little over a year; Malcolm Reiss took over again in September 1951, and three issues later, in March 1952, Jack O'Sullivan became editor. A contemporary market survey records that in 1953, payment rates were only one to two cents per word; this was substantially less than the leading magazines of the day. (Note: In 1944 the rates were one to one-and-a-half cents per word.) Planet Stories returned to a quarterly schedule beginning with the Summer 1954 issue, but the pulp market was collapsing, and the Summer 1955 issue was the final one.

== Contents and reception ==
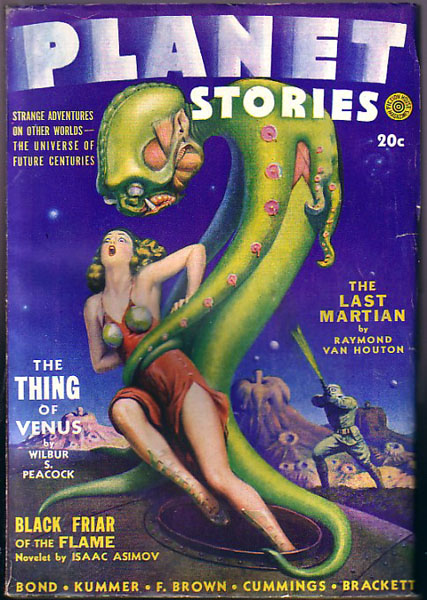
A characteristic Planet Stories cover, by Alexander Leydenfrost. Planet Stories was one of the magazines to make the "bug-eyed monster", or "BEM", a staple of science fiction art.

Fiction House apparently made the decision to launch Planet Stories so quickly that there was little time for Reiss to obtain new stories, so he worked with Julius Schwartz and other authors' agents to fill the first issue. The results were unremarkable, but Reiss was energetic, and was able to improve the quality of fiction in succeeding issues, though he occasionally apologized to the readers for printing weak material. The magazine was exclusively focused on interplanetary adventures, often taking place in primitive societies that would now be regarded as "sword and sorcery" settings, and was aimed at a young readership; the result was a mixture of what became known as space opera and planetary romances—melodramatic tales of action and adventure on alien planets and in interplanetary space. Planet Stories relied on a few authors to provide the bulk of its fiction in the early years, with Nelson Bond providing eight lead stories, some of them novels. Fourteen more were written by Ray Cummings and Ross Rocklynne; and Leigh Brackett was also a regular contributor, with seventeen stories in total published over the lifetime of the magazine.

The letter column in Planet Stories was titled "The Vizigraph"; it was very active, with long letters from an engaged readership. It often printed letters from established writers, and from fans who would go on to become well known professionally: Damon Knight's letters are described by sf historian Mike Ashley as "legendary"; and Robert Silverberg commented in a letter in the Summer 1950 issue that Ray Bradbury "certainly gets some original ideas, if not good ones". The editors put a good deal of effort into keeping the letter column friendly and lively; contemporary writer and editor Robert Lowndes recalls that "Reiss was sincere and urbane; Wilbur [Peacock] enjoyed taking his coat off and being one of the crowd".

Despite the focus on melodramatic space adventure, the fiction in Planet Stories improved over the next few years, largely due to the work of Brackett and Bradbury. Both writers set many of their stories on a romanticized version of Mars that owed much to the Barsoom of Edgar Rice Burroughs. Brackett's writing improved during the 1940s from formulaic pulp adventure to a more mature style, and she became the most accomplished writer of planetary romances of her day. She wrote a well-received series of stories featuring adventurer Eric John Stark, which began in the Summer 1949 Planet Stories with "Queen of the Martian Catacombs". Her work had a strong influence on other writers, in particular Gardner F. Fox, Lin Carter and Marion Zimmer Bradley, Brackett later argued that "the so-called space opera is the folk-tale, the hero-tale of our particular niche in history". Also arguing in support of Planet Stories, science fiction critic John Clute has commented that "the content was far more sophisticated than the covers".

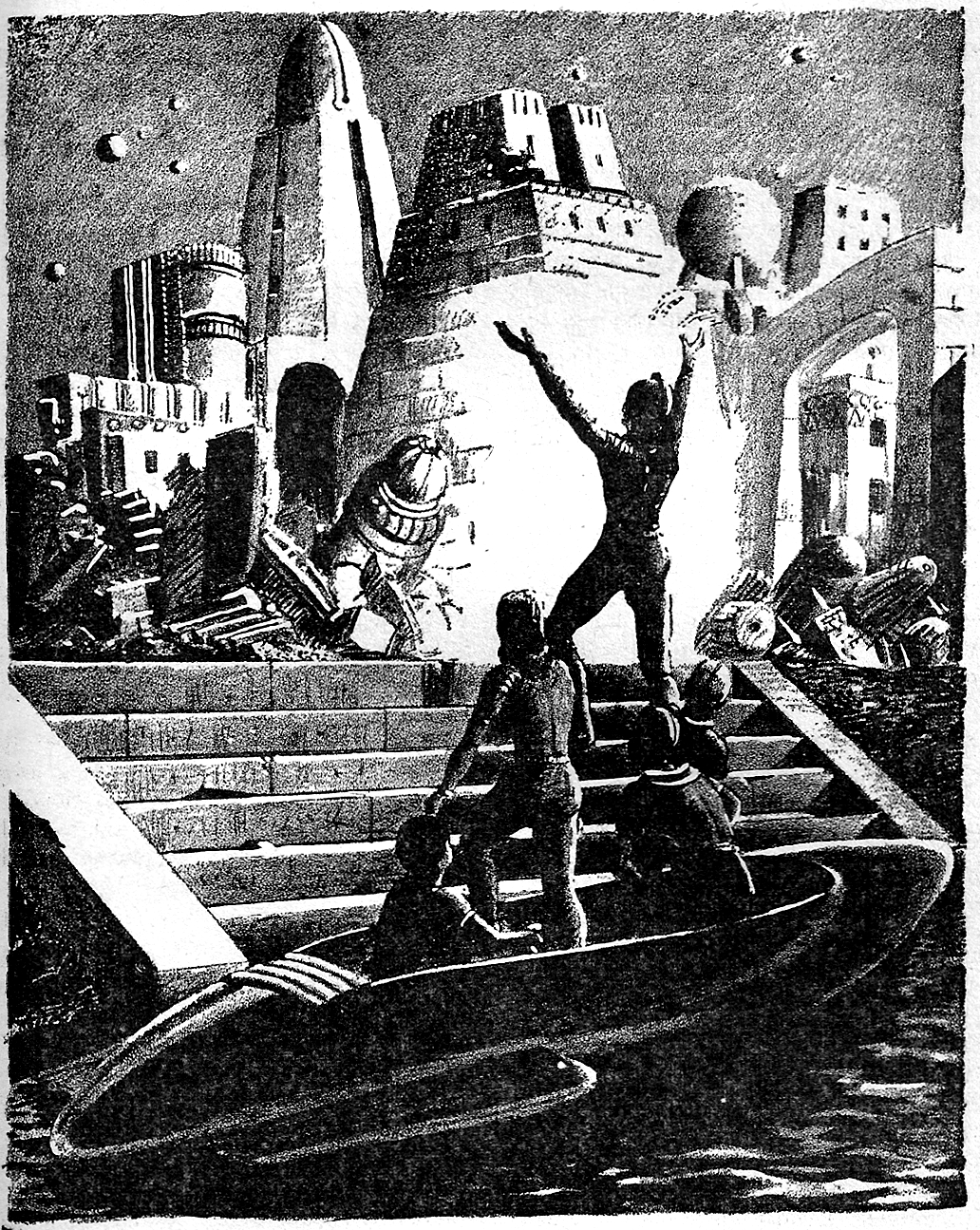
Interior illustration by Alexander Leydenfrost for Bradbury's "The Million Year Picnic"

Bradbury's work for Planet Stories included two of the stories that he later incorporated into The Martian Chronicles, including "The Million Year Picnic"; only one other story in the series had appeared before this. He also collaborated on a story with Brackett, "Lorelei of the Red Mist", based on an idea of hers, which appeared in the Summer of 1946. His stories for Planet demonstrate his reservations about the advance of technology, in particular "The Golden Apples of the Sun" (November 1953), and "A Sound of Thunder" (January 1954, reprinted from the June 28, 1952 issue of Collier's Weekly). (Note: According to Thomas Clareson, this "seems to be the one reprint Planet Stories used".) Bradbury's work in Planet Stories is regarded by one pulp historian, Tim de Forest, as "the magazine's most important contribution to the genre".

Several other well-known writers appeared in Planet Stories, including Isaac Asimov, Clifford Simak, James Blish, Fredric Brown and Damon Knight. Asimov's story, originally titled "Pilgrimage", appeared in 1942; Asimov had been unable to sell the piece elsewhere, and rewrote it numerous times for different editors, adding a religious element at John Campbell's request, and removing it again when Malcolm Reiss asked for further changes. Reiss bought it but changed the name to "Black Friar of the Flame". (Note: The story has often been regarded as Asimov's worst, though Asimov himself felt that this was partly due to the weak title, and that one or two of his earlier stories were weaker.)

Jerome Bixby, who took over as editor in 1950, was a published writer and was knowledgeable about sf, though he had primarily written western fiction. In his short tenure he did much to improve the magazine, persuading the established writers to produce better material and finding unusual variations on the interplanetary adventure theme such as Poul Anderson's "Duel on Syrtis" in March 1951, about an Earthman tracking an alien on Mars, and Theodore Sturgeon's "The Incubi on Planet X", about aliens who kidnap Earth women. After Bixby's departure in 1952, Planet Stories' major contribution to the genre was the discovery of Philip K. Dick, whose first sale, "Beyond Lies the Wub", appeared in the July 1952 issue. Dick went on to sell another four stories to Planet Stories over the next two years, including "James P. Crow", in which a human suffers discrimination in a world of robots.

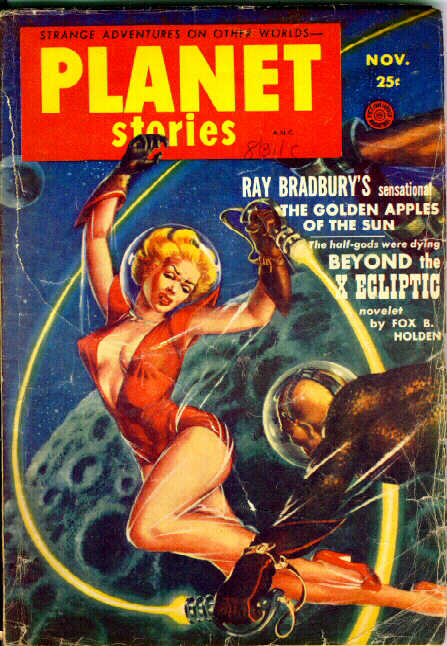
The November 1953 Planet Stories, by Kelly Freas, showing the "sexual dimorphism" mentioned by Harry Harrison, and also showing the new cover logo that was adopted from the Spring 1947 issue

Planet Stories clearly targeted a young readership, and the simultaneous launch in 1939 of Planet Comics may have been instrumental in attracting young readers to science fiction, but Ashley suggests that it is more likely that Planet Stories attracted experienced readers of the genre who "still yearned for the early days of sf". Critic and sf historian Thomas Clareson has commented that "Planet seemed to look backward towards the 1930s and earlier", an impression that was strengthened by the extensive use of interior artwork by Frank Paul, who had been the cover artist for the early Gernsback magazines in the 1920s. Paul's distinctive style was strongly associated with the early years of the field. The cover art was also melodramatic, with beautiful women—sometimes human, sometimes princesses from other planets—and threatening aliens. The subheading on the cover read "Strange Adventures on Other Worlds – The Universe of Future Centuries" until the end of 1946.

Although almost every story that appeared in Planet could be described as space opera, there was some variety of approach to the basic themes. Earth was sometimes threatened, but more often the action took place on other worlds, bringing Earthmen into local conflicts. This often involved beautiful native princesses, though the romantic storylines were stereotyped. Some respite from these depictions of women was provided by Leigh Brackett, who described her own heroines as "usually on the bitchy side—warm-blooded, hot-tempered, but gutty and intelligent" (with "bitchy" intended as a compliment). During World War II, it was in Planet Stories that a reader was most likely to come across a female character who could fight, instead of merely being fought over. Sex itself had long been taboo in the pulp magazines, but some stories in Planet depicted sexuality more directly than the competing magazines would. The readers were not always accepting; one reader in a letter in 1949 supported "jettisoning the taboos", but a letter writer in 1946 objected to "Lorelei of the Red Mist", saying that he needed "a pint of Listerine to wash the dirty taste out of my mouth". The cover artwork generally emphasized sex as well, with what sf author and critic Harry Harrison sardonically referred to as "sexual dimorphism in space": heavy, functional spacesuits for the men, and transparent suits through which bikinis or swimsuits could be seen for the women.

Hannes Bok contributed much of the interior artwork, and the covers were often by Allen Anderson during the early years. Later, Kelly Freas became a frequent cover artist. One of the best artists to work on Planet was Alexander Leydenfrost, whose work, according to Clareson, "epitomized much of what Planet Stories represented in the 1940s", though his cover artwork was less impressive than his black-and-white interior illustrations. Artist and sf historian David Hardy has described Leydenfrost's black and white illustrations as "almost Rembrandtian in his use of light and shade".

== Bibliographic details ==
		Spring			Summer			Fall			Winter	
	Jan	Feb	Mar	Apr	May	Jun	Jul	Aug	Sep	Oct	Nov	Dec
1939												1/1
1940			1/2			1/3			1/4			1/5
1941			1/6			1/7			1/8			1/9
1942			1/10			1/11			1/12			2/1
1943			2/2		2/3				2/4			2/5
1944			2/6			2/7			2/8			2/9
1945			2/10			2/11			2/12			3/1
1946			3/2			3/3			3/4			3/5
1947			3/6			3/7			3/8			3/9
1948			3/10			3/11			3/12			4/1
1949			4/2			4/3			4/4			4/5
1950			4/6			4/7			4/8		4/9	
1951	4/10		4/11		4/12		5/1		5/2		5/3	
1952	5/4		5/5		5/6		5/7		5/8		5/9	
1953	5/10		5/11		5/12		6/1		6/2		6/3	
1954	6/4		6/5		6/6		6/7		6/8			6/9
1955			6/10			6/11						
Issues of Planet Stories, showing volume/issue number. Underlining indicates that an issue was titled as a quarterly (e.g. "Fall 1949") rather than as a monthly. The colors identify the editors for each issue: Malcolm Reiss Wilbur S. Peacock Chester Whitehorn Paul L. Payne; Jerome Bixby Jack O'Sullivan

The editorial succession at Planet was:

- Malcolm Reiss: Winter 1939 – Summer 1942.
- Wilbur S. Peacock: Fall 1942 – Fall 1945.
- Chester Whitehorn: Winter 1945 – Summer 1946.
- Paul L. Payne: Fall 1946 – Spring 1950.
- Jerome Bixby: Summer 1950 – July 1951.
- Malcolm Reiss: September 1951 – January 1952.
- Jack O'Sullivan: March 1952 – Summer 1955.

Planet Stories was a pulp-sized magazine for all of its 71 issues. It was 128 pages for most of its existence, and was priced at 20 cents. With the November 1950 issue the page count was cut to 112, and the price went up to 25 cents. The page count was reduced to 96 for one issue in March 1952, but then returned to 112 until Summer 1954, when it was again reduced to 96 pages for the last five issues.

Planet began as a quarterly. A brief attempt was made to switch to a bimonthly schedule in 1943; a March and May issue appeared, but the next issue was titled Fall 1943, inaugurating another quarterly period. The Fall 1950 issue was followed by November 1950, and this began a bimonthly period that lasted until May 1954, which was followed by a Summer 1954 issue. A quarterly schedule resumed until the end; unusually, the winter issue that year was dated Winter 1954/55, rather than with a single year. The volume numbering was consistent throughout the magazine's publication, with five volumes of 12 issues and a final volume of 11, but there were three errors in the volume numbering printed on the spine (though not on the masthead): issue 5/10 was given as 5/8 on the spine; issue 5/11 was given as 6/3 on the spine; and issue 6/11 was given as 6/12 on the spine.

A British reprint edition appeared between March 1950 and September 1954; the issues were numbered but not dated, and were heavily cut, with only 64 to 68 pages. There are twelve issues known; a thirteenth has been rumored but not seen by any sf bibliographers. The publisher was Pembertons, though some sources indicate that Streamline Publications was the publisher of the first issue. Issues 7 and 8 of the British edition also contained nonfiction material reprinted from Startling Stories and Thrilling Wonder. A Canadian edition was published by American News Co., from Fall 1948 to March 1951 (a total of twelve issues); these were identical to the corresponding U.S. editions.

=== Related publications ===
In the summer of 1950 Fiction House launched a companion magazine to Planet. It was titled Two Complete Science-Adventure Books; the policy was to print two novels in a single magazine. It appeared three times a year and lasted until the spring of 1954. In 1953 Fiction House launched a reprint magazine, Tops in Science Fiction, selecting the contents from the backfile of stories that had appeared in Planet. It only lasted for two issues, the second of which received almost no distribution.

A derivative anthology, The Best of Planet Stories #1, appeared in 1975 from Ballantine Books, edited by Leigh Brackett, containing seven stories reprinted from between 1942 and 1952. It was intended to be the first of a series, but no further volumes appeared.

== See also ==
- History of science fiction

== Sources ==
- Ashley, Michael (1976) [First edition 1975]. The History of the Science Fiction Magazine Vol. 2 1936–1945. Chicago: Henry Regnery Company. ISBN 0-8092-8002-7.
- Ashley, Mike (2000). The Time Machines:The Story of the Science-Fiction Pulp Magazines from the Beginning to 1950. Liverpool: Liverpool University Press. ISBN 0-85323-865-0.
- Ashley, Mike (2005). Transformations: The Story of the Science Fiction Magazines from 1950 to 1970. Liverpool: Liverpool University Press. ISBN 0-85323-779-4.
- Asimov, Isaac (1979). In Memory Yet Green. Garden City: Doubleday. ISBN 0-385-13679-X.
- Brackett, Leigh (July 1944). "The Science-Fiction Field". Writer's Digest. 24: 27.
- Carter, Paul A. (1977). The Creation of Tomorrow: Fifty Years of Magazine Science Fiction. New York: Columbia University Press. ISBN 0-231-04211-6.
- Clute, John (1995). Science Fiction: The Illustrated Encyclopedia. New York: Dorling Kindersley. ISBN 0-7894-0185-1.
- Clute, John; Nicholls, Peter (1993). The Encyclopedia of Science Fiction. New York: St. Martin's Press, Inc. ISBN 0-312-09618-6.
- de Camp, L. Sprague (1953). Science-Fiction Handbook: The Writing of Imaginative Fiction. New York: Hermitage House.
- de Forest, Tim (2004). Storytelling in the Pulps, Comics and Radio: How Technology Changed Popular Fiction in America. Jefferson, NC: MacFarland. ISBN 0-7864-1902-4.
- Holdstock, Robert, ed. (1978). Encyclopedia of Science Fiction. London: Octopus Books. ISBN 0-7064-0756-3.
- Kyle, David (1977). The Pictorial History of Science Fiction. London: Hamlyn. ISBN 0-600-38193-5.
- Tuck, Donald H. (1982). The Encyclopedia of Science Fiction and Fantasy: Volume 3. Chicago: Advent: Publishers, Inc. ISBN 0-911682-26-0.
- Tymn, Marshall B.; Ashley, Mike (1985). Science Fiction, Fantasy and Weird Fiction Magazines. Westport CT: Greenwood Press. ISBN 0-313-21221-X.
