= John Raymond science fiction magazines =

American magazines published 1952 to 1954

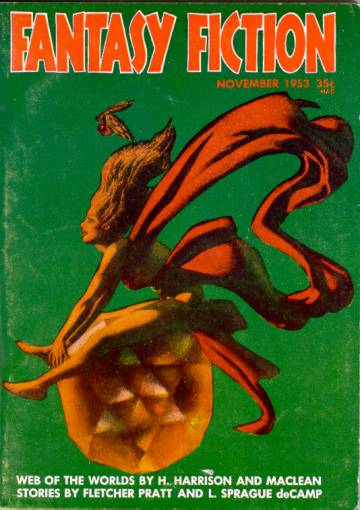
Cover by Hannes Bok for the last issue of Fantasy Magazine

Between 1952 and 1954, John Raymond published four digest-size science fiction and fantasy magazines. Raymond was an American publisher of men's magazines who knew little about science fiction, but the field's rapid growth and a distributor's recommendation prompted him to pursue the genre. Raymond consulted and then hired Lester del Rey to edit the first magazine, Space Science Fiction, which appeared in May 1952. Following a second distributor's suggestion that year, Raymond launched Science Fiction Adventures, which del Rey again edited, but under an alias. In 1953, Raymond gave del Rey two more magazines to edit: Rocket Stories, which targeted a younger audience, and Fantasy Magazine, which published fantasy rather than science fiction.

All four magazines were profitable, but Raymond did not reinvest the profits in improving the magazines and was late in paying contributors. Del Rey persuaded Raymond to invest some of the profits back into the magazines, but nothing came of this and, when del Rey discovered that Raymond was planning to cut rates instead, he resigned. Two of the magazines continued for a short time with Harry Harrison as editor, but by the end of 1954 all four magazines had ceased publication.

The magazines are well regarded by science fiction historians. They carried fiction by many names well known in the field or who later became famous, including Isaac Asimov, Philip K. Dick, Robert E. Howard, and John Jakes.

== Publication history ==
American science fiction magazines first appeared in the 1920s with the launch of Amazing Stories, a pulp magazine published by Hugo Gernsback. World War II and its attendant paper shortages interrupted the expanding market for the genre, but by the late 1940s the market began to recover again. In October 1950, the first issue of Galaxy Science Fiction appeared; it reached a circulation of 100,000 within a year, and its success encouraged other publishers to enter the field. John Raymond, at that time primarily a publisher of men's magazines, was told by his distributor that science fiction was a growing field; Raymond knew nothing about science fiction so he asked Lester del Rey for advice, and then offered del Rey the job of editor on the new magazine. Del Rey was initially hesitant, but eventually agreed to become the editor of Space Science Fiction; the first issue was dated May 1952. When another distributor approached Raymond to ask if he would be interested in publishing a science fiction title, he suggested to del Rey that this second magazine should focus on action stories. The result was Science Fiction Adventures, which appeared in November that year. Raymond decided to expand further, launching Fantasy Magazine in March 1953, and Rocket Stories, which like Science Fiction Adventures was aimed at a juvenile readership, the following month. Ziff-Davis had launched Fantastic, a rival fantasy magazine, in 1952, and once Fantasy Magazine appeared, they threatened to sue Raymond because of the similarity of the titles, so Raymond renamed the magazine Fantasy Fiction from the second issue onwards.

Del Rey used several pseudonyms for these magazines: he edited the last issue of Fantasy Magazine as "Cameron Hall", and edited Rocket Stories as "Wade Kaempfert"; for Science Fiction Adventures he edited as "Philip St. John" and used another alias, "R. Alvarez", as the publisher's name. Del Rey hired Michael Shaara, later a Pulitzer Prize-winning author, as associate editor.

Raymond's management of the magazines was chaotic, according to del Rey. There was no fixed schedule; one day Raymond told del Rey that the magazines would be switching to a monthly schedule, but nothing came of this. Raymond would simply decide that copy was due the very next day for one of them, which meant that del Rey had to scramble to find material ready to use—since Raymond paid on publication, del Rey did not acquire an inventory of stories ahead of time to use when needed. This made it harder for him to keep to the plan of targeting each magazine to a particular readership. Del Rey sometimes had to write a story overnight to have a lead story for an issue: "it was a miserable way to run a magazine", he recalled. Raymond did give del Rey complete control of story purchasing; as a favor to del Rey, John Campbell, the influential editor of Astounding Science-Fiction, called Raymond and convinced him that it was necessary to let the editor make the fiction decisions.

All four magazines made money. The break-even circulation for each magazine was 45,000; Fantasy Magazine was selling about 70,000 an issue, and Science Fiction Adventures did nearly as well. Both Space Science Fiction and Rocket Stories had distribution problems, which harmed circulation, but they were still profitable. The money was not reinvested in the magazines, and del Rey proposed to Raymond that they increase the per-word rate paid to authors, pay earlier instead of on publication, and increase del Rey's own remuneration. Del Rey calculated the increased circulation that would be needed for these investments to show a net profit, and threatened to resign unless Raymond approved the changes. Raymond agreed, but did nothing to put the new plan into effect, and when del Rey went to the offices to complain because he had heard that some authors had not been paid, he was told by the art director that Raymond, who was not there, had decided to cut payment rates to one cent per word, only include art by the art director, and cut the page count on all the magazines to 144 pages. Del Rey resigned, and later recalled that "Raymond informed everyone that I'd been fired, and his lawyer threatened to sue me for slander and libel because I'd returned the manuscripts to authors, stating that the new rate was in effect. My reply convinced the lawyer to lay off."

Raymond hired Harry Harrison to replace del Rey for three of the magazines; Harrison would not take on Fantasy Magazine as he felt he knew too little about the fantasy genre. Raymond hired Fletcher Pratt for Fantasy Magazine instead; Pratt assembled a fifth issue, but would not pass the manuscripts to Raymond until the authors were paid. Raymond did not pay, and the fifth issue never saw print. The other titles did not last much longer; Space Science Fiction never saw an issue with Harrison's name as editor, and only one more issue of Rocket Stories and three of Science Fiction Adventures appeared, the final issue of the latter being dated May 1954.

== Contents and reception ==
=== Space Science Fiction ===
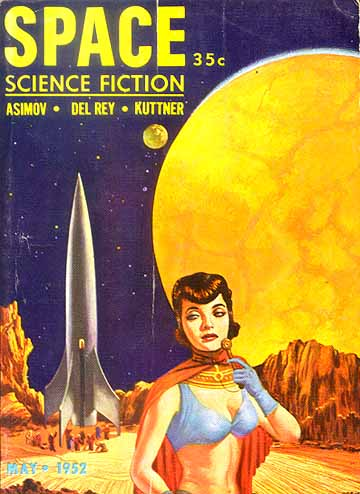
Cover of the first issue of Space Science Fiction, by Paul Orban

In his editorial for the first issue of Space Science Fiction, del Rey declared that the title did not restrict the magazine to fiction about space, interpreting space as "extension in all directions", including fantasy, though as it turned out Fantasy Magazine became the outlet for the fantasy stories del Rey acquired. "Our only taboo will be against dullness", del Rey claimed and, according to science fiction historian Mike Ashley, "by and large del Rey kept his word". The first issue of Space Science Fiction was put together from what del Rey was able to acquire quickly. He worked with Frederik Pohl's literary agency to find stories, and contributed the lead story, "Pursuit", himself, under the pseudonym "Philip St. John". Other contributors to the first issue included Henry Kuttner, with "The Ego Machine", one of his humorous robot stories, and Isaac Asimov, with "Youth". Del Rey also wrote the lead story for the second issue, under another alias, "Erik van Lhin". The cover layout changed to mirror the inverted "L" format used by Galaxy, the cover artwork being reduced in size and a strip of color at the left and top edges of the cover. Del Rey again obtained material from well-known writers: Clifford Simak, Fletcher Pratt, and Murray Leinster appeared. The issue also included "The God in the Bowl", the first of Robert E. Howard's unpublished Conan the Barbarian stories to be revised for publication by L. Sprague de Camp; de Camp had obtained H. P. Lovecraft's notes on the story, and those were published as well.

Later issues featured three serialized novels: H. Beam Piper's Ullr Uprising, T. L. Sherred's Cue for Quiet, and Poul Anderson's The Escape, which was cut short after one installment when the magazine ceased publication. It was later published in full, retitled Brain Wave. Del Rey also bought Algis Budrys' first sale, "Walk to the World", which appeared in the November 1952 issue, and published some of Philip K. Dick's early stories, including "Second Variety", which appeared in the May 1953 issue. Other contributors included Damon Knight and James E. Gunn. Interior artists included Paul Orban, Kelly Freas, Peter Poulton and Alex Ebel; Hannes Bok and Earle Bergey were among the cover artists.

=== Science Fiction Adventures ===
Science Fiction Adventures was initially intended to contain more action-oriented stories than Space Science Fiction. Del Rey explained his goals for the magazine in an editorial in the first issue: "We also feel that science fiction isn't meant to be educational. It is primarily fiction, not a discourse on science. The science in the stories should be acceptable, of course ... But the problems of the people in the stories must be stressed more than the gadgets they use." Fiction in the first issue included The Fires of Forever, a novel by Chad Oliver, stories by L. Sprague de Camp and C. M. Kornbluth, and a non-fiction article by del Rey. In the opinion of science fiction historians Ted Krulik and Bruce Tinkel, the magazine improved over its first year; they particularly praise Police Your Planet, a novel by del Rey that began serialization in the March 1953 issue under the pseudonym Erik van Lhin, and Raymond Gallun's Ten to the Stars. Well-known writers from whom del Rey was able to obtain stories included Algis Budrys, Robert Sheckley, Ross Rocklynne, and Wilmar Shiras. When Harrison took over as editor, he had little time to make his mark on the magazine, but notable stories during his tenure include Kornbluth's novel The Syndic, which was serialized in Harrison's first two issues. Harrison also printed "The Hanging Stranger", an early Philip K. Dick story, in the December 1953 issue, and Thomas Scortia's first sale, "The Prodigy", in the March 1954 issue. Many of the cover artists were well-known in the field, including Alex Schomburg, Mel Hunter, Ed Emshwiller, and H. R. Van Dongen. Interior artists included Roy Krenkel, Kelly Freas and Paul Orban.

A series of articles about science fiction appeared, including William Tenn's "The Fiction in Science Fiction", described by Krulik and Tinkel as "one of the first to treat science fiction as a serious form of literature". Damon Knight, one of the most important literary critics of science fiction to emerge from within the genre, contributed a series of book reviews; he had begun the column, titled "The Dissecting Table", in 1950 in the short-lived magazine Worlds Beyond, and continued it in Science Fiction Adventures. Ashley considers that it although it took some time for the effects of Knight's reviews to appear, the column drove "a wedge into the [science fiction] world and [began] to separate what was good from what was bad". After Science Fiction Adventures folded, Knight's column continued, in Future Science Fiction and elsewhere, and Knight's criticism was later collected into In Search of Wonder, which won a Hugo Award in 1956.

In Ashley's opinion, the magazine quickly developed into one of the stronger science fiction (SF) magazines of the day, and Krulik and Tinkel agree, describing it as "one of the more interesting and better edited SF magazines to appear in the 1950s. It was a shame that the publisher did not care about the magazine; Science Fiction Adventures could have been one of the most successful magazines of the 1950s."

=== Rocket Stories ===
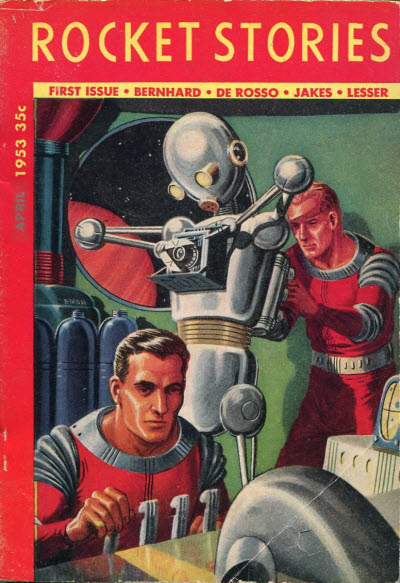
Cover of the first issue of Rocket Stories; art by Ed Emshwiller

Rocket Stories was aimed at a more juvenile audience than Raymond's other science fiction magazines, and del Rey openly acknowledged the similarities between space opera stories and Westerns in his editorials, writing "We aren't calling the magazine science fiction, for the same reason that stories of the old west were never called science or invention fiction. Colt, in inventing the revolver, made that west possible, and the men who are working on the rockets will make our future possible." He persuaded Algis Budrys to write a straightforward Western translated into science fiction terms, titled "Blood on My Jets", and under the house name Wade Kaempfert printed stories by two Western writers, Noel Loomis and H. A DeRosso. Other fiction contributors included Poul Anderson, Milton Lesser, George O. Smith, and John Jakes; artists included Ed Emshwiller, Paul Orban, and Kelly Freas. Science fiction historian E. F. Casebeer considers that the magazine published some good material, and that it contained "far more than its covers and title might imply".

=== Fantasy Magazine ===
For Fantasy Magazine, Del Rey declared an editorial policy focused on modern fantasy, rather than gothic horror: "Fantasy...is a game of logic. Like fairy chess, it should be a game of logic where the basic rules are flexible, filled with some delightful surprise to twist the mind out of the rut, and must be played with consummate skill to be at all interesting." This approach placed Fantasy Magazine in the newer fantasy tradition begun by Unknown in 1939 and carried on by Beyond Fantasy Fiction, rather than the older gothic tradition then exemplified by Weird Tales. The first issue of Fantasy Magazine contained a Conan story by Robert E. Howard, edited by L. Sprague de Camp and rewritten by del Rey, based on Howard's story "The Black Stranger"; another Conan story, also rewritten by de Camp, followed later in the year. Del Rey published work by Algis Budrys, L. Sprague de Camp, John Wyndham, Clark Ashton Smith, Philip K. Dick, Katherine MacLean, Harry Harrison and Robert Sheckley, and obtained covers from Hannes Bok for all four issues of the magazine. Ashley describes the magazine as "another high-quality product", and "highly collectible", and science fiction historian Russell Letson agrees: "[it] combined attractive appearance...with above-average fiction", and comments that it ceased publication "long before its potential was exhausted". It was popular with the readership of the day; science fiction historian David Kyle says that it "won considerable acclaim", and Donald Tuck, a science fiction bibliographer and encyclopedist, records that "many fantasy enthusiasts rated it the best fantasy magazine since Unknown".

== Bibliographic details ==
	Year	Jan	Feb	Mar	Apr	May	Jun	Jul	Aug	Sep	Oct	Nov	Dec
Space Science Fiction	1952					1/1				1/2		1/3	
Space Science Fiction	1953		1/4	1/5		1/6		2/1		2/2			
Science Fiction Adventures	1952											1/1	
Science Fiction Adventures	1953		1/2	1/3		1/4		1/5		1/6			2/1
Science Fiction Adventures	1954			2/2		2/3							
Fantasy Magazine	1953			1/1			1/2		1/3			1/4	
Rocket Stories	1953				1/1			1/2		1/3			
Volume/number for all issues of all four magazines. The colors indicate the editor; Lester del Rey for all issues except the last three Science Fiction Adventures and the last Rocket Stories, which were edited by Harry Harrison

Each issue of each of the four magazines was digest-sized, 160 pages, and priced at 35 cents, and the publisher in each case was John Raymond. The publishing company used was Science Fiction Publications for the first issue of Science Fiction Adventures, Future Publications for the remaining issues of Science Fiction Adventures and for Fantasy Magazine, and Space Publications for Space Science Fiction and Rocket Stories. The editorial succession is given in the table at right. Del Rey used a pseudonym for his editing work in some cases: the first two issues of Rocket Stories were edited under the house name "Wade Kaempfert", and the first six issues of Science Fiction Adventures were edited under one of del Rey's aliases, "Philip St. John". For the last issue of Fantasy Magazine del Rey used the house name "Cameron Hall" as the editor.

A British edition of Space Science Fiction was issued by Archer Press in 1952 and 1953; these were undated, but numbered from 1/1 to 2/3, with five issue numbers to a volume. These reprinted the US issues unchanged, except that the first US issue was printed as the British volume 2 number 3, and the second through eighth US issues were printed as the first through seventh UK issues.

== Sources ==
- Ashley, Michael (1976). "Introduction: From Bomb to Boom". In Ashley, Michael (ed.). The History of the Science Fiction Magazine Vol. 3 1946–1955. Chicago: Contemporary Books, Inc. pp. 13–109. ISBN 0-8092-7842-1.
- Ashley, Mike (1985). "Space Science Fiction". In Tymn, Marshall B.; Ashley, Mike (eds.). Science Fiction, Fantasy and Weird Fiction Magazines. Westport, Connecticut: Greenwood Press. pp. 585–587. ISBN 0-3132-1221-X.
- Ashley, Mike (2005). Transformations: The Story of the Science Fiction Magazines from 1950 to 1970. Liverpool: Liverpool University Press. ISBN 0-85323-779-4.
- Casebeer, E. F. (1985). "Rocket Stories". In Tymn, Marshall B.; Ashley, Mike (eds.). Science Fiction, Fantasy and Weird Fiction Magazines. Westport, Connecticut: Greenwood Press. pp. 488–490. ISBN 0-3132-1221-X.
- Edwards, Malcolm; Nicholls, Peter (1993). "SF Magazines". In Clute, John; Nicholls, Peter (eds.). The Encyclopedia of Science Fiction. New York: St. Martin's Press. pp. 1066–1071. ISBN 0-312-09618-6.
- Krulik, Ted; Tinkel, Bruce (1985). "Science Fiction Adventures (1952–1954)". In Tymn, Marshall B.; Ashley, Mike (eds.). Science Fiction, Fantasy and Weird Fiction Magazines. Westport, Connecticut: Greenwood Press. pp. 520–524. ISBN 0-3132-1221-X.
- Kyle, David (1977) [1976]. The Pictorial History of Science Fiction. London: Hamlyn. ISBN 0-600-38193-5.
- Letson, Russell (1985). "Fantasy Magazine". In Tymn, Marshall B.; Ashley, Mike (eds.). Science Fiction, Fantasy and Weird Fiction Magazines. Westport, Connecticut: Greenwood Press. pp. 268–270. ISBN 0-3132-1221-X.
- Stone, Graham (1977). Index to British Science Fiction Magazines: Vol 1: Contents Lists. Sydney: Australian Science Fiction Association. ISBN 0-9598342-2-2.
- Strauss, Erwin (1966). Index to the S-F Magazines, 1951–1965. Cambridge, Massachusetts: MIT Science Fiction Society. OCLC 746542.
- Tuck, Donald H. (1982). The Encyclopedia of Science Fiction and Fantasy: Volume 3. Chicago: Advent Publishers. ISBN 0-911682-26-0.
