= Imaginative Tales =

American science fiction magazine

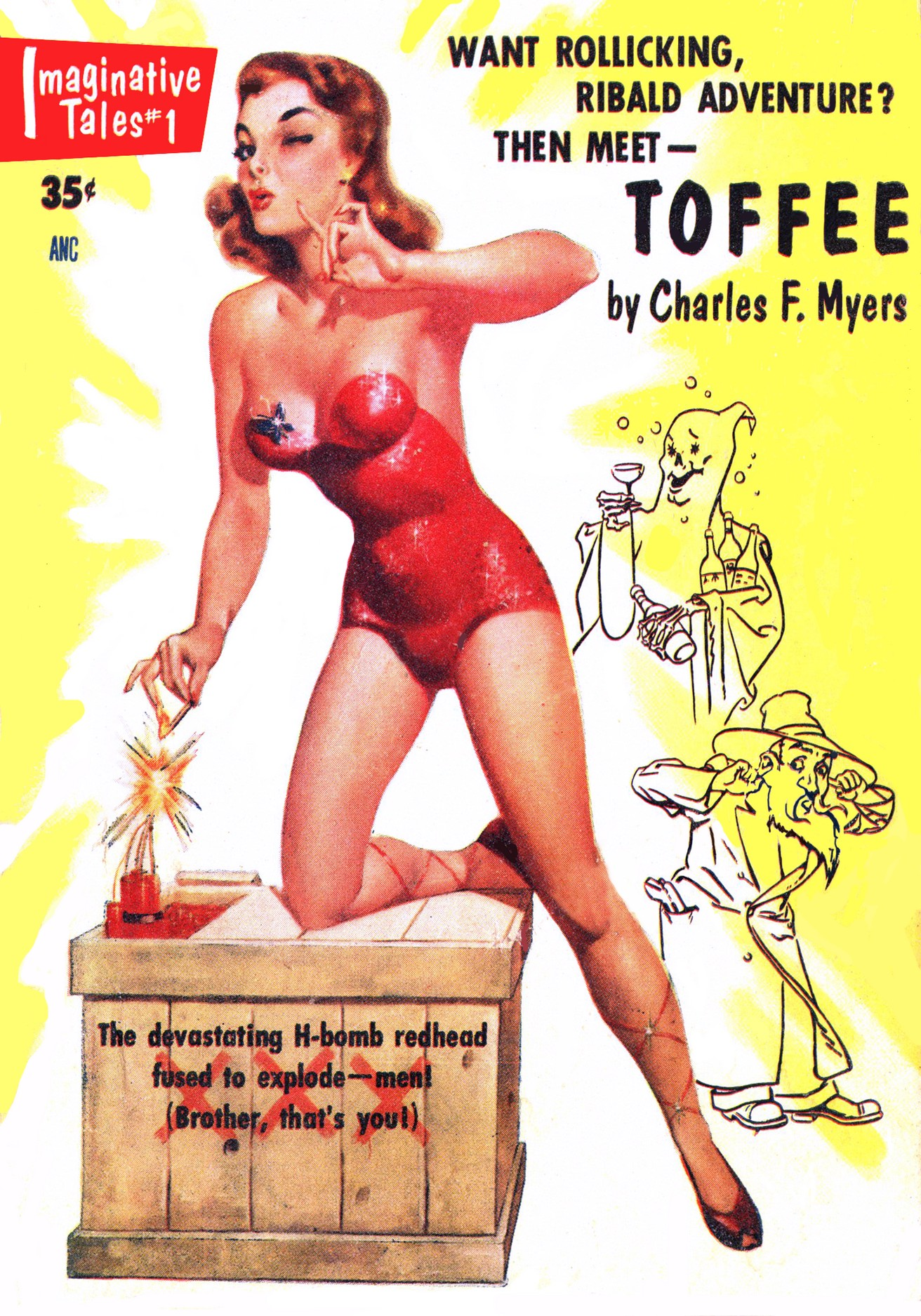
- Debut issue of Imaginative Tales, September 1954; cover by Harold W. McCauley
- Editor: William Hamling
- Categories: Fantasy, science fiction
- Format: Digest
- Publisher: Greenleaf Publishing
- Founded: 1954
- Final issue: 1958
- Country: United States

Imaginative Tales was an American fantasy and science fiction magazine launched in September 1954 by William Hamling's Greenleaf Publishing Company. It was created as a sister magazine to Imagination, which Hamling had acquired from Raymond A. Palmer's Clark Publishing. Imaginative Tales began as a vehicle for novel-length humorous fantasy, early issues featuring stories by Charles F. Myers and Robert Bloch. After a year, Hamling switched the focus to science fiction and it became similar in content to Imagination, publishing routine space operas. In 1958, with public interest in space high, Hamling changed the title to Space Travel, but there was little effect on sales. Magazine circulation was suffering because of the rise of the paperback, and the liquidation in 1957 of American News Company, a major magazine distributor, made it even harder for small magazines to survive. Hamling eventually ceased publication of both Imaginative Tales and Imagination in 1958, preferring to invest the money in Rogue, a men's magazine he had started in imitation of Playboy in 1955.

== Publication history ==
Issues of Imaginative Tales showing volume/issue number
Year	Jan	Feb	Mar	Apr	May	Jun	Jul	Aug	Sep	Oct	Nov	Dec
1954									#1		#2	
1955	#3		#4		#5		1/6		2/1		2/2	
1956	3/1		3/2		3/3		3/4		3/5		3/6	
1957	4/1		4/2		4/3		4/4		4/5		4/6	
1958	5/1		5/2		5/3		5/4		5/5		5/6	
William and Frances Hamling were editors throughout the run. The title changed to Space Travel with the July 1958 issue.

American science fiction (sf) magazines first appeared in the 1920s with the launch of Amazing Stories, a pulp magazine published by Hugo Gernsback. World War II and its attendant paper shortages interrupted the expanding market for the genre, but by the late 1940s, the market had begun to recover again. From a low of eight active magazines in 1946, the field expanded to 20 in 1950, and a further 22 had commenced publication by 1954. One of these new titles was Imagination, launched at the end of 1950 by Raymond Palmer, who had recently left Ziff-Davis, where he had edited Amazing Stories. In September 1950, Ziff-Davis made the decision to move to New York from Chicago, and Palmer quickly sold Imagination to William Hamling, a Ziff-Davis editor who did not want to relocate and who, like Palmer, chose instead to become an independent publisher. In 1954, Hamling started a fantasy magazine as a companion to Imagination. He titled it Imaginative Tales; science fiction historian Mike Ashley comments that this was surprisingly late for Hamling to start a second title since it might have been more profitable earlier in the sf magazine boom, which was fading by late 1954.

When Hamling announced the magazine, in an editorial in Imagination, he said "We actually don't know whether it's a magazine or paperback in magazine form", adding that it would usually carry book-length works. The format of the magazine was initially similar to that of Galaxy Science Fiction Novels, a series of digest-sized novels started in 1950 as a companion to Galaxy Science Fiction.

Frank M. Robinson, a science fiction writer who was friends with Hamling, suggested changing the title from Imaginative Tales to Caravan and printing men's adventure fiction. Hamling knew Hugh Hefner, the publisher of Playboy, and Hefner set up a lunch with Playboy's distributor to talk over the idea. The distributor was unimpressed, and Hamling instead pitched the idea of a magazine that would compete with Playboy. The result was Rogue, which was more profitable than either of Hamling's science fiction titles. (Note: In Robinson's memoir, he recalls the conversation as having taken place after the title change to Space Travel, but he must be mistaken since Rogue's first issue is dated December 1955.)

By the late 1950s, paperbacks were displacing magazines on newsstands, and there was widespread resistance among dealers to stocking new magazines. A further blow came in 1957 with the collapse of American News Company, the most important US magazine distributor. The resulting disruption spelled the end for many sf titles. Hamling retitled Imaginative Tales to Space Travel with the July 1958 issue, hoping to cash in on public interest in the early years of the space program. There was no impact on sales, though Ashley attributes this to the lack of interest among book dealers in new magazines. At the end of 1958, both the science fiction titles were axed, and Hamling invested the money in Rogue instead.

== Contents and reception ==
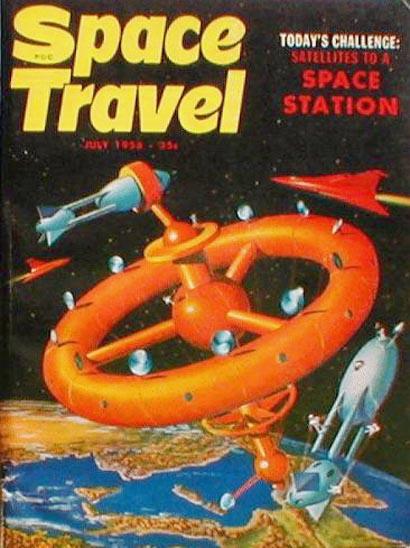
The first issue under the new title, Space Travel, dated July 1958. The cover art is by Malcolm Smith.

While at Ziff-Davis, Hamling had become familiar with Fantastic Adventures, the fantasy companion to Ziff-Davis's Amazing Stories, and he was a fan of Charles F. Myers' "Toffee" stories, which had appeared in Fantastic Adventures from the late 1940s. These were humorous stories about a man and his beautiful imaginary girlfriend, Toffee, with what sf historian Joe Sanders calls an "exaggerated pose of naughtiness": nakedness was implied but never directly described, and sex was only hinted at. Hamling printed several "Toffee" stories in Imagination, and when he launched Imaginative Tales, he reprinted Shades of Toffee, a book-length story that had appeared in the June 1950 Fantastic Adventures, in the first issue. The first six issues included novels in the same vein by either Charles Myers or Robert Bloch, and short fiction soon began to appear. With the seventh issue, dated September 1955, Hamling converted Imaginative Tales to more closely resemble Imagination, printing science fiction rather than fantasy.

Mike Ashley describes the contents from this point on as "unremarkable space opera"; regular contributors included some of the same writers who wrote for Imagination, including Geoff St. Reynard and Dwight V. Swain. Hamling obtained stories from Edmond Hamilton, who Sanders considers "the most readable of the novelists", but he also printed Raymond Palmer's "The Metal Emperor"—"a dreadful Shaveristic adventure" according to Ashley, and "possibly the worst story published in either of Hamling's magazines", according to Sanders. Henry Slesar's first sale, "The Brat", appeared in the November 1955 issue. Other writers included many authors who had been regular contributors to Amazing Stories—Hamling was familiar with these writers from his time at Ziff-Davis.

Non-fiction features appeared once Hamling gave up on the novels-only format: a letter column, editorials, and an sf movie news column, "Scientifilm Marquee", contributed by Forrest Ackerman. With the title change to Space Travel, science articles by Henry Bott and Guenther Schmidt were added.

== Bibliographic details ==
All 26 issues were digest-sized, edited by William Hamling and published by Hamling's Greenleaf Publishing Company, based in Evanston, Illinois. The schedule was bimonthly and was completely regular. Issues were initially labelled with a number only, and no volume; from the sixth issue this changed to a volume/number format. There were five volumes, all with six issues except the second volume, which had two. The first issue was 160 pages, and all remaining issues were 128 pages. The price was 35 cents throughout the run.

== Sources ==
- Ashley, Michael (1976). The History of the Science Fiction Magazine Vol. 3 1946–1955. Chicago: Contemporary Books. ISBN 978-0-8092-7842-8.
- Ashley, Mike (2005). Transformations: The Story of the Science Fiction Magazines from 1950 to 1970. Liverpool: Liverpool University Press. ISBN 978-0-85323-779-2.
- Day, Donald B. (1952). Index to the Science-Fiction Magazines 1926–1950. Portland, Oregon: Perri Press.
- Edwards, Malcolm; Nicholls, Peter (1993). "SF Magazines". In Clute, John; Nicholls, Peter (eds.). The Encyclopedia of Science Fiction. New York: St. Martin's Press. pp. 1066–1071. ISBN 978-0-312-09618-2.
- Robinson, Frank M. (2017). Not So Good a Gay Man. New York: Tor. ISBN 978-0-7653-8209-2.
- Sanders, Joe (1985). "Imaginative Tales". In Tymn, Marshall B.; Ashley, Mike (eds.). Science Fiction, Fantasy and Weird Fiction Magazines. Westport, Connecticut: Greenwood Press. pp. 347–350. ISBN 978-0-313-21221-5.
- Strauss, Erwin S. (1966). Index to the S-F Magazines, 1951–1965. Cambridge, Massachusetts: MIT Science Fiction Society.
- Weinberg, Robert (1988). A Biographical Dictionary of Science Fiction and Fantasy Artists. Westport, Connecticut: Greenwood Press. ISBN 0-313-24349-2.
