= Rogue (magazine) =

Men's magazine

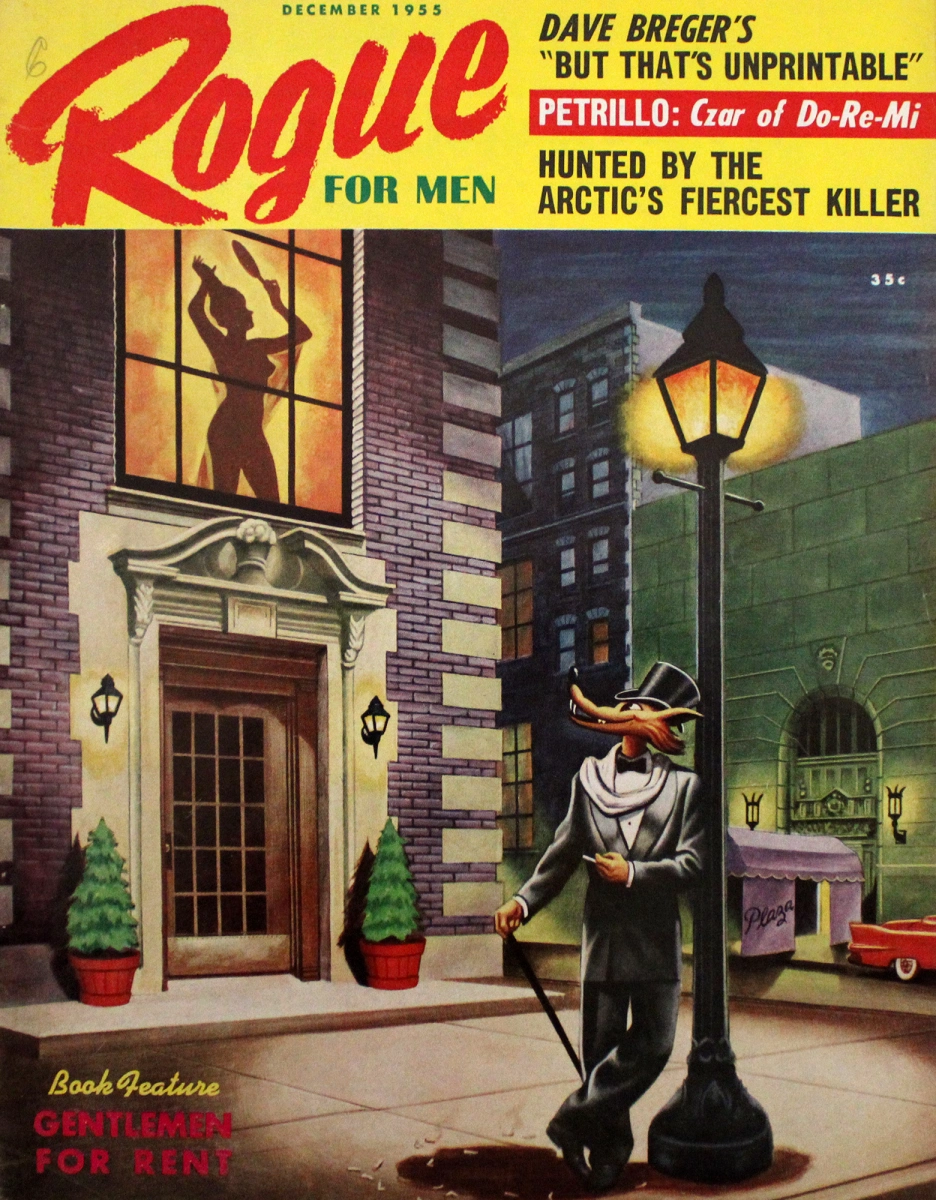
Cover of the first issue of Rogue, December 1955

Rogue was a Chicago-based men's magazine published by William Hamling from 1956 until 1965. Founding editor Frank M. Robinson was succeeded by other editors including Harlan Ellison and Bruce Elliott. The magazine was subtitled "Designed for Men."

== Rogue: Designed for Men ==
The magazine was a direct competitor to Playboy (the first American magazine to present female nudity and sexually oriented material in a relatively sophisticated format), offering nude and semi-naked photographs and sex advice aimed at a male audience. Rogue featured a wider array of fiction and science fiction than Playboy, along with coverage of jazz by Ted White and others. The first two magazine articles written by Hunter S. Thompson appeared in Rogue in 1961. Other contributors included J. G. Ballard, Brian Aldiss, Graham Greene, Damon Knight, Fritz Leiber, Richard Matheson, Frederik Pohl, William Saroyan, Philip Wylie, and, while still in high school, Steven E. de Souza. Departments were written by Alfred Bester, Robert Bloch, and Fredric Brown.

== Greenleaf Publishing Company ==
In 1950, Ziff-Davis moved its offices to New York City. Hamling declined to go with the company to New York due to family ties and was permitted to form a publishing company of his own instead.

Previously, Hamling had organized the Greenleaf Publishing Company in Chicago. The company was at different times known as Greenleaf Classics, Reed Enterprises, Corinth Publications, Regency Publications, Blake Pharmaceuticals, Phenix Publishing, and Freedom Publishing. His wife, science fiction author Frances Deegan Yerxa Hamling, worked closely with him in the early years of his publishing company.

Imagination published its first issue in October 1950. No editorial credit given for the first two issues; however, the editorials and letter column responses were signed "RAP", initials associated with Raymond A. Palmer. The first two issues were published by Clark Publishing Company, which also published Palmer's similar-looking Other Worlds. However, Hamling was the editor and publisher, and Ray Palmer was the front. Although Hamling credits Palmer as the editor in response to a letter in the February 1951 issue of Fantastic Adventures, the last issue of that magazine which Hamling edited. Hamling became notorious for the layers of insulation he kept between his activities, his fronts, and even between himself and co-workers and employees. With the third issue Imagination became an "official" Greenleaf property, as did Imaginative Tales when it was launched in September 1954.

While publishing Imagination, Hamling also worked as an editor for a time at a small office on Chicago's North Side on a magazine at PDC (Publisher’s Development Corporation) named Today’s Man where a fellow employee was Hugh Marston Hefner. Hamling’s boss was George von Rosen. The first fellow employee to befriend Hamling was von Rosen's promotion director, Hugh Hefner, who had already decided to quit and start a magazine of his own.

Operating as Greenleaf Publishing Company, he published Imagination and its later companion Imaginative Tales (September 1954 – May 1958, 26 issues), later re-titled Space Travel (July–November 1958), until September 1958. Neither survived the decade and the death of their distributor, American News Company. Hamling regularly purchased cartoons from struggling artist Hugh Hefner.

The name for the publishing company came from the telephone exchange (Greenleaf) where he was living at the time in Evanston, Illinois.

=== Rogue: Designed for Men ===
Greenleaf Publishing Company initially published science fiction magazines and a spectrum of similar publications, and it was not until November 1955 that Greenleaf published the first issue of Rogue (although it had a cover date of December), a magazine that was competitive with Playboy, a magazine dealing with sex which had been published for about two years at this time. In 1953, as a solo and unidentified effort, Hugh Hefner's Playboy V1#1 appeared without a date late in the year [November]. It was an almost immediate success with that calendar photo of Marilyn Monroe being reused to its best advantage.

About Playboy and Hugh Hefner, Hamling states in a letter to his friend and lawyer Stanley Fleishman: "I remember my friend Hugh Hefner coming to me in 1953 to propose an idea for a magazine to be called Playboy. Hef was talented but poor and his passion had been a fantasy. He was a struggling cartoonist and had been working in a clerical capacity at Esquire. I had been buying fantasy cartoons from him for several years (they were so bad I never published them but he needed the money and to this day we have a running routine where I threaten to issue them as a nostalgic bonanza but defer to his pleadings of personal embarrassment) and one evening he and his charming wife, Millie [Mildred "Millie" Williams], visited Fran and me, and I responded to his suggestion of Playboy with the remark, 'Hef, you can't sell sex to the American public.' Today Hef is still talented, but he is no longer poor. My quote has since become a standard joke in the fourth estate.

"...That night brought another turning point in my life. While I refused financial participation in Playboy (the greatest economic error in publishing history) I helped him secure authors and artists and indeed over the early years provided a training school for his editorial and art personnel. I trained the editors, and he hired them away..."

In October 1955 Hamling began the non-science fiction men's magazine Rogue, initially subtitled "for Men" (later "Designed for Men"), a clear imitation of Playboy. After a young Hugh Hefner sought out the experienced publisher, his fellow ex-von Rosen employee, and offered him a significant stake (50%) to partner with him at the time of its startup on a new idea he had for a magazine for men. The magazine was to be called Playboy. Hamling turned him down—and kicked himself for doing so for years thereafter.

Greenleaf, then, published Rogue and a photographic magazine in book form called Model Art, as well as different numbers of science fiction publications. Rogue began much as Imagination had before it, there in the Hamling basement on Fowler Avenue in Evanston. Hamling and his wife, Frances, sat side by side and worked on it together, business as usual.

Hefner thought he was helping his friend, Hamling, change Space Travel, a science fiction digest, into a men's book, by hooking Hamling up with his distributor. Not wanting to set Hamling up as a competitor, he set restrictions on the new Rogue—no slick paper stock, no four-color reproduction, or full-page cartoons, and certainly no centerfold.

Hamling was the editor and publisher, his wife, Frances, was the executive editor, and Frank M. Robinson was the first managing editor. Henry Botts, a friend of Hamling, became the first associate editor. Lead fiction was by a hot science fiction author, Harlan Ellison who became associate editor with the third issue (April 1956).

The first issue of Rogue was published in November 1955, with a December release date. Following Hefner's successful lead with the first issue of Playboy, that first issue of Rogue contained "A New Aspect of Marilyn Monroe," with a full-page photo of the star hiding behind a towel, plus five more nice publicity photos all by Andre de Dienes.

The initial cover price of the magazine was 35 cents, and it remained that way until January 1960 when it was raised to 50 cents. In just one more year, the cover price was raised to 60 cents and remained at that figure for the rest of the life of the Greenleaf magazine.

Three issues later Frank M. Robinson left for the first time.

In the beginning, both Playboy and Rogue were distributed by Empire News, and in 1955 attempts were made by the Post Office to ban these magazines. The services of Thurman Arnold, Abe Fortas, and Paul Porter were obtained in Washington, D.C., and Judge Thurman Arnold represented Rogue before the district court in Washington, where an injunction was granted against the government and the magazine received the right to use the mails. The adjudication took place in 1957. Second-class mailing privileges were granted, and within thirty days Playboy received the same relief.

Under the watchful eye of publisher William Hamling, Rogue became a close competitor of Playboy and as a Greenleaf publication was at the press from December 1955 until December 1965. Rogue was well known for its racy cartoons, although always filled with plenty of provocative semi-nude photos, what set Rogue apart from all other competitors was the great science fiction and fantasy, along with other fiction from notable authors.

Editors (at one time or another) at Greenleaf Publishing—the parent company—included Harlan Ellison, Algis Budrys, Larry Shaw, and Bruce Elliott. Robert Bloch ("Basic Bloch"), Alfred Bester ("Bester’s World"), and Mack Reynolds (as the foreign travel editor) all had regular columns, articles, and fiction published. Hunter S. Thompson, Lenny Bruce, Charles Beaumont, Arthur C. Clarke, Fritz Leiber, J. G. Ballard, Ben Hecht, Graham Greene, William Saroyan, Philip Wylie, George Clayton Johnson, William F. Nolan, Wilson Tucker, and Robert Silverberg also popped up sometimes. Many of these authors worked for Playboy and the Rogue editors got a lot of submissions with Hugh Hefner's fingerprints on them. No other men’s magazine—or science-fiction magazine or digest, for that matter—ever had that much editorial talent in depth.

One such story on this order was "All of Us Are Dying," by George Clayton Johnson which appeared in the October 1961 issue. In this there is a character with interchangeable personalities who is so plastic in his emotional make-up that he can be mistaken by anybody for practically anyone else that they may happen to know. Later it was produced as a script by Rod Serling as "The Four of Us Are Dying" for his The Twilight Zone television anthology series.

In that same October 1961 issue, Hunter S. Thompson saw his first story appear in print, "Big Sur: The Tropic of Henry Miller."

Rogue was a Playboy imitator from its very beginning, but so were 90% of all girlie magazines that started in the 1950s so that can’t be held against them. Rogue had higher than average production standards and the early covers painted by Lester W. Bentley, Hans Zoff, and Lloyd Rognan, with the libidinous Wolf mascot were quite eye-catching. The Wolf mascot, Rogue’s version of the Playboy Rabbit logo, appeared on every early cover, and lasted from the first issue through the 18th issue, February 1958.

In 1950, Lloyd Rognan returned to the States from Europe to polish his skills a bit more at the Chicago Art Institute, which he did from 1951 to 1953. From 1953 to early 1955 he worked for the advertising agency of Jahn Ollier. By late 1955 he was married, living in Glenview, Illinois, and a freelance full-time artist on his own. Glenview was near Evanston, the home of Bill Hamling's Greenleaf Publishing Company. Time and again Lloyd’s work (based on hand-painted gouache watercolor paintings for the cover of Rogue by Hans Zoff) appears on the early covers of Rogue for Men magazine, Imaginative Tales, Imagination, Fate, and others.

In 1957 seven issues of Rogue appeared.

In 1958 business at Rogue was so good that both Imagination and Imaginative Tales were no longer needed to make Hamling money, so in October, they discontinued devoting full time to Rogue. Coupled with the recent liquidation of the major US distributor for magazines, American News Company, Hamling ceased publication of his science fiction digests and began to concentrate solely on Rogue. The company offices were moved from the Hamling basement to the Graphics Arts Building at Sherman and Dempster in Evanston.

Time passes and everything changes in bits and giant steps. Rogue is doing nicely and looks promising, and a little money comes rolling in. The Hamlings get a brand-new house in Highland Park, a step up from Evanston, and Rogue gets an office of its own.

Also, in January 1958, the last Rogue cover done by Lloyd Rognan appeared. With the February issue, attractive young women begin to adorn the Rogue covers.

In 1958 nine issues of Rogue appeared.

And then Hefner sold his distribution contract, for a reported $1 million. This left his old distributor with no "sophisticated" men's magazine unless Rogue was upgraded, which it was—to slick paper, full color, full-page cartoons, and a centerfold.

In mid-1959, Frank M. Robinson, having recently left his job at Science Digest, went back to work for Hamling as associate editor on the revamped, now slick magazine. Hamling was, of course, still the editor and publisher. And his wife, Frances, was the executive director.

After Rogue became established Hamling also brought Harlan Ellison back again as another associate editor (although it was a "secret front" to disguise his real activity—starting the Greenleaf pornographic paperback business with Hamling's first imprint, Nightstand Books). And Lenny Bruce was brought on board as a columnist.

Frank M. Robinson even managed to bring his old childhood friend, Charles McNutt, a regular contributor to Playboy under his Charles Beaumont alias, as a regular contributor to Rogue as C.B. Lovehill.

In 1959 Hamling began to publish two lines of adult books under the false front name of Blake Pharmaceutical Company, in offices housed at the back of the same building as Rogue.

Even though competing with Playboy, throughout the early formative years Rogue was hampered by the head start Hugh Hefner had already gained; while Rogue remained 80 pages, Playboy grew by leaps and bounds to 120, 150, etc.

Although unrecognized, Rogue often beat Playboy to the punch, as when they were the first to publish excerpts from Lenny Bruce's autobiography, several issues before Playboy reprinted the same excerpts in late 1964 and early 1965. Ajay Budrys, now an editor at Playboy, hushed up the offer before Hamling could sue.

The new, revamped Rogue began in 1959, with a review of the movie, The Intruder, based on a book by Charles Beaumont. Frank M. Robinson, William F. Nolan, and George Clayton Johnson (friends of Beaumont's), all on set with star William Shatner, for the review, were invited by Beaumont to appear in bit parts.

In 1959 nine issues of Rogue appeared. Rogue finally began to look like Playboy with the September 1959 issue.

Beginning in 1960 Hamling began to visit friends and family in Palm Springs and Beverly Hills and decided to move his home and business to that state. In 1964 Hamling moved his family to Palm Springs. When Hamling first moved to California, Greenleaf continued to publish the magazine (Rogue). A subsequently formed corporation, Corinth, published pornographic paperback books, and Reed Enterprises was organized to do the book distribution. Later, in 1966 and 1967 the book and magazine publishing was consolidated under the Greenleaf banner and Corinth was liquidated, so there remained Greenleaf and Reed Enterprises, only.

At the beginning of 1960, after a few months at Rogue and Nightstand, Harlan Ellison left Rogue and Nightstand, to return to New York City. In his absence, a total of 31 books were produced by the book division staff.

Hamling went to New York and bribed Ellison to come back to Rogue and Nightstand with the further inducement of more money and the start of a line of clean paperbacks, including the writings of Harlan Ellison, that became known as Regency Books.

In late 1960, Harlan Ellison, along with his new wife Billie, moved to Evanston where Harlan was employed by William Hamling at Rogue. He quickly became established in an apartment in Evanston late that year and went back to work editing Nightstand Books and doing an initial set-up for Regency Books.

Never one to dodge political controversy, Rogue published a first-person article on SNCC—the Student Nonviolent Coordinating Committee—by a staffer for Regency Books, Jerry Demuth., and "Balladeers & Billy Clubs", an article about the so-called "Beatnik Riot" (a police assault upon a peaceful Greenwich Village protest by folksingers led by Izzy Young) by Ted White, Rogue music critic.

Only seven issues of Rogue appeared in 1960. But in 1961 Rogue hits its stride becoming a monthly with twelve issues that year, as with both 1962 and 1963.

By early 1961, when Earl Kemp was hired on at Blake Pharmaceutical and while Ellison was still there, they were working in a 4-room office suite in the Graphics Arts Building and there was no name on the door.

The first Regency book was Firebug by Robert Bloch, covered by the Dillons. The second was Gentleman Junkie by Harlan Ellison, a cover by the Dillons. The sixth was Memos From Purgatory, again by Harlan Ellison, cover by the Dillons—and then Ellison was finished.

In 1961, after Harlan started Regency Books, twelve titles were published that first year, but Harlan was gone before the year was over, divorcing his wife, Billie, and moving to Hollywood—to write. Meanwhile, in the front office, Rogue was planning on going monthly.

In 1962, a nineteen-year-old Bruce Glassner was hired to fill the fourth editor office at Blake.

Rogue was chugging right along as a monthly at 82 pages and selling for 60 cents a copy. In the back-office suite, the Blake crew produced 130 titles or 10.9 books per month. They were selling extremely well and there was a constant demand for more.

In the fall of 1962, Rogue lost its distributor and had to arrange for another, Kable, to take over in mid-year. Ajay Budrys left for Playboy Press. And Frank M. Robinson stole Bruce Glassner (who wrote under a couple of bylines—Robert Courtney and Mike Williams—as well as his column, "Bruce’s Bag"), now twenty, and had him transferred to the Rogue staff, initially as an assistant editor, later associate editor, as was Frank's new hire David Stevens who wrote the Rogue About Town column for the next two years—their starting salaries were $100 a week! And at Blake Larry Shaw briefly replaced Ajay Budrys and was in turn replaced by everyone's old friend and drinking buddy from Rogue, Bruce Elliott (in mid-1963 during the office coup).

Bruce Elliott was a minor science fiction writer before working at Rogue. Of the eight science fiction stories he wrote during the 1950s, the most notable was "Asylum Earth."

Rogue added eight pages, a circulation and ad department, and a new executive editor, Bruce Elliott, who introduced the staff to the three-hour drinking lunch. The staff played, rather than devoting their time to Rogue, while Hamling was in San Diego, setting up his move to Palm Springs, and the new revamped adult book enterprise.

Soon Rogue, the company, had twenty-nine employees, counting the salesmen, and art staff.

Eventually, in late 1963 Hamling realized his mistake, and eased Bruce Elliott out of his executive editor position at Rogue and into Blake...and then out of Blake. Elliott returned to New York City and committed suicide by walking into heavy rush hour traffic in November 1972, lapsing into a coma and dying four months later. Earl Kemp replaced him at Blake.

The classic Rogue staff was formed as Frank M. Robinson replaced Bruce Elliott a top editor at Rogue as Hamling promoted him from managing editor to Editor-in-Chief, and Bill Mackle became managing editor (within six months he was hired away by Playboy). Ron Bradford was the senior art director with Terry Rose in the art department. Patty O’Brien was the receptionist. And Earl Kemp became boss of the Blake paperback division.

When Bruce Elliott, Terry Rose, and business manager Art Johns and his crew of ad salespeople failed after six issues of Rogue to increase revenues, they were all fired.

Next, Rogue cartoonist Phil Interlandi was hired away by Playboy. In revenge, Frank decided to run Hefner's cartoons, but as an afterthought decided not to, not realizing that by doing so, he paved his way to a later job working for Playboy.

In 1964 only six issues of Rogue appeared.

Finally, Rogue ran out of steam when regional distributors decided not to send Hamling money owed as they decided to longer distribute to small towns as well. So, Hamling cut the staff in half, but retained Bruce Glassner, the editor of "Bruce’s Bag," and Frank's right-hand man, David Stevens.

In late 1965, Frank M. Robinson, along with art director Dick Thompson, went to Commerce, California to check out their new printer. In the next issue, Bruce Glassner accompanied Frank and quit upon his return to Chicago. In the following issue, David Stevens accompanied Frank.

Rogue never could compete with Playboy and was eventually sold. The next issue, the sixth to appear that year, the last Greenleaf issue carrying the remaining Greenleaf staff on the masthead, was published in December 1965. Of note, the December 1965, 86th issue, the last Greenleaf production, contained: "Hey Look," an interview with Harvey Kurtzman who was a comic book writer at EC Comics who invented Mad magazine, and wrote Little Annie Fanny for Playboy.

With the technical demise of Rogue, Frank M. Robinson was offered a job by A.C. Spectorsky at Playboy but refused. However, he recommended David Stevens, who stayed at Playboy for more than thirty years, writing non-fiction accounts of his far-flung adventures.

For a brief period, Hamling tried to commute from California to Evanston, to keep Rogue running, but it became unproductive. By late 1965 the word was out to the staff members to find another job in a real hurry, and they did, one by one, leave for greener pastures.

Finally, before the end of the year, Rogue was "sold" as a property and the magazine, under Greenleaf's ownership, ceased with the December 1965 issue. Only that wasn't quite the case. The February/March 1966 issue, V11#1, was published by Douglas Publishing Company, Inc., 7046 Hollywood Boulevard, Los Angeles, California but it was an issue prepared by the Greenleaf Rogue staff.

Finally, Hamling sold the magazine. The final Greenleaf-produced issue was already in preparation and was sent to the Douglas Publishing Company, Inc., the new publisher. The Rogue indicia were not on the issue, nor was the masthead. The last issue contained Fred Pohl’s "Day Million" (Feb. 1966) which won a Hugo Award, and George Bamber’s "The Man Who Could Not Feel." Alfred Bester's column hung on to that issue, as did the final Rogue About Town column by Dave Stevens—titled "Hippity Hobbit", a tribute to J. R. R. Tolkien.

The existence and influence of Rogue have had a powerful effect on American culture due to the broad editorial, artistic, and writing talent it utilized. The Oxford English Dictionary has even determined that Fred Pohl's original story "Day Million" is especially worthy of a citation for first-time use originating a new phrase into the English language. "They met cute," which appears in the middle of the story.

As a Greenleaf publication, Rogue had a lifespan of exactly ten years. After Greenleaf, as a Douglas publication, Rogue continued for an additional 15 years.

Frank M. Robinson followed Hamling to San Diego, hired to spy on Vice President Earl Kemp. Frank lasted one month working for the revamped adult book business, and went freelance once again.

=== Adult paperbacks ===
All of William "Bill" Hamling's publications, such as Imagination and Imaginative Tales, are as noteworthy for the entertaining characters involved in their publication as they are as magazines in their own right. Bill Hamling not only founded Rogue, one of the early US men's magazines but went on to develop a pornography publishing empire that eventually ran him afoul of President Nixon and the FBI in the 1970s and landed him in jail, along with Earl Kemp, his long-time friend, managing editor of his various enterprises and vice-president of Greenleaf.

In New York City, popular young science fiction writer Robert Silverberg discovered adult paperback publisher Bedside Books. Then (1959), Silverberg was looking for new markets to conquer. Adult paperback publisher Bedside Books looked like a natural. In short order, Silverberg was selling them manuscripts that appeared under the bylines of David Challon and Mark Ryan. Silverberg realized the new market direction could be the answer to many writers’ wildest dreams in the very soon.

Harlan Ellison, along with his wife Charlotte [Stein], was preparing to move to Evanston, Illinois, to work for William Hamling as an associate editor for Rogue. Silverberg approached Ellison with the glorious possibilities for the future of energetic young writers and had him all primed and ready for William Hamling so Ellison could lay out the road map to Silverberg's glorious vision in front of Hamling. Everyone thought Ellison was in Evanston to work on Rogue, Hamling's Playboy-type men's magazine. Even Harlan thought so at times, and talked about it incessantly, thereby furthering his modest reputation.

Hamling liked the idea of the proposed books and grasped the concept of the throwaway sleazy paperback firmly in his hands. After a bit of formulation, Hamling sent Ellison back to New York City to start the money-making wheels in motion.

Harlan Ellison went straight to Robert Silverberg to report on his success with Hamling in the initial set-up phase of the operation. It was Silverberg, not Ellison, who took the proposal to Scott Meredith of the Scott Meredith Literary Agency that eventually opened the doors to the fabled black box clandestine enterprise that virtually flooded the country with hard-core pornography. Thus, as Hamling began publishing Nightstand Books virtually all its books were fed to it via black boxes (normal submissions were in gray boxes) and a Grand Central Station post office box.

The books not only fetched an immediate $1,000 in payment, but they also earned royalties which Hamling paid promptly. In 1960 and 1961, Silverberg was writing a book every other week for this series, many of them published under the ‘Don Elliott’ pseudonym. Others writing these books included Lawrence Block and Donald Westlake who subsequently rewrote several of his as mystery novels.

Harlan Ellison, in 1959, came into his own. William Hamling was taking Ellison's proposition literally and setting him up to be the King of Pornography at Blake Pharmaceuticals right down the hallway from Rogue magazine under Hamling's watchful eyes. All Harlan had to do was figure out how to make it all work, locate the pieces, grease up the machine, and get it running. It wasn’t easy being the only first and original genuine King of Pornography.

In the beginning, those books appeared under the imprint of Nightstand Books and were produced by a corporation named Freedom Publishing Company. Illinois corporate law, at the time, required three legal Illinois residents to become a corporation. Freedom Publishing were three ex-coworkers from the Ziff-Davis Chicago era William L. Hamling, Raymond A. Palmer, and Richard S. Shaver. However, since both Palmer and Shaver had become residents of Wisconsin, Freedom Publishing was closed. Now a defunct Illinois corporation it was purchased cheaply by William Hamling. After his purchase two titles were published every month by his new re-incorporated company, Blake Pharmaceuticals, in Evanston, Illinois.

Once reincorporated, Hamling redirected Blake Pharmaceuticals into publishing pornography and Harlan Ellison was running the whole show while seemingly running Rogue instead. In those days, despite the popular acceptance of hard-core pornography in movie theaters all across the country, an operation like Blake Pharmaceuticals was at the very least frowned upon and was kept, as much as possible, completely under cover.

Producing Nightstand Books turned out to be more work than Harlan Ellison had originally expected to be involved with while operating Blake Pharmaceuticals. So much so that, in early 1960, Harlan quit. He returned to New York City where he stayed with Ted White, a jazz reviewer for Rogue at the time, for a while. Harlan did, however, continue to write cover blurbs for the books from there for a long time, at $45 per blurb. For a while, it was Harlan's major source of income.

Back home at Blake Pharmaceuticals, Frank M. Robinson, under orders from his boss at Rogue, filled in as editor of Nightstand Books with the help of some reliable freelance editors. Evanston was home to Northwestern University, the Medill School of Journalism, etc., and overflowed with an abundance of competent, willing freelancers. Only Frank didn't like being forced to help with the operation and felt he had his hands full being the real editor of Rogue.

At the same time, in New York, Harlan Ellison was arrested in early September 1960 for possession of a handgun, brass knuckles, and a switchblade. He briefly resided in The Tombs and wrote a real piss-off report about it that inspired William Hamling again. All he needed was for Harlan to return to Evanston and take over where he left off, only this time it would be under the brand-new disguise as editor of Regency Books, which would appear and pretend to be a straight book publisher. One of the earliest titles, Hamling assured him, would be Memos From Purgatory, Harlan's fictionalized account of his arrest and incarceration.

Harlan Ellison was once again crowned King of Pornography at Blake Pharmaceuticals, now aka Regency Books.

In 1961, Ajay Budrys replaced Ellison. Earl Kemp began his tenure at Blake, along with the introduction of two new lines, Idle-Hour Books and Leisure Readers. Simultaneously, Larry Shaw was hired.

Shaw briefly replaced Budrys when he left to work for Playboy Press, in their book division. Shortly after that, Larry Shaw accepted the job he wanted and dreamed over all the time he worked at Blake, as an editor for one of the imprints of Blake's competing Milton Luros pornography organization, American Arts Enterprises, in Los Angeles.

Finally, after years of patiently waiting, Earl Kemp inherited the crown of the King of Pornography by default; he was the only one Bill Hamling could trust to hang around for a while. Earl Kemp became the fourth King of Pornography at Blake Pharmaceuticals and held onto the crown for a full decade.
