= Psi-man Heal My Child! =

1955 short story by Philip K. Dick

Illustration from short story in Imaginative Tales (November 1955)

"Psi-man Heal My Child!" is a science fiction short story by American writer Philip K. Dick, originally published in the November 1955 issue of the magazine Imaginative Tales. It also has the alternative titles "Psi-Man" and "Outside Consultant", and appeared, among others, in Dick's short story collections The Book of Philip K. Dick and Second Variety.

== Plot summary ==
The story revolves around a group of "Talents", people with varying psychoactive powers in a post-apocalyptic setting. The remaining survivors of humanity are hunkered down in isolated communities and can only leave with permission from their military leaders. The main plot of the story follows a family who chooses to have a Talent heal their daughter of cancer instead of the harsh treatments of their local hospital. A side plot follows one of the Talents, who has the power to traverse time, repeatedly attempting to change the present by returning to the past.

== Reception ==
Australian science fiction author Damien Broderick wrote "this trope of a paranormal power to move back and forth in time is at the heart of this story, which presents a grim post-nuclear future in which a small gathering of the psi-gifted attempt to maintain themselves while helping heal the blighted normals ... it is not a satisfying adventure story, but it is the truth of Philip K. Dick".

== See also ==
- Psi
- Paranoid fiction
