= Frances Yerxa =

American writer and editor (1917–2019)

Frances Yerxa Hamling
- Hamling, from a 1970 newspaper
- Born: September 23, 1917; Onondaga, Michigan, US
- Died: March 3, 2019; Caldwell, Idaho US (buried in hometown)
- Occupation(s): Writer, editor
- Spouses: Leroy Yerxa, WIlliam L. Hamling
- Children: 6

Frances Ferris Yerxa Hamling (September 23, 1917 – March 3, 2019) was an American science fiction writer and editor.

== Early life ==
Frances Ferris was born in Onondaga, Michigan, the daughter of Harry Longley Ferris and Ora M. Sherd Ferris. She graduated from high school in 1935.

== Career ==
Frances Yerxa wrote essays and science fiction, under various bylines (possibly including "Frances M. Deegan", though this may also have been a separate writer). She also assisted her second husband in editing pulp magazines. She was managing editor of the magazines Imagination and Imaginative Tales from 1953 to 1958, and executive editor of Rogue, a men's magazine. As an officer of Greenleaf Publishing, she was a co-defendant with her husband in 1965, when the company was charged with copyright infringement. In 1976, her ex-husband Hamling served several months in prison for publishing obscene works.

Yerxa's essays for science fiction publications were on various topics, from comets and telescopes to "ancient barbering customs", Cambodian dance, and Atlantis. She chaired the auction and registration committees at the tenth World Science Fiction Convention, known as Chicon II, in 1952.

In 1964, Frances Hamling and her husband bought a fully-furnished Arthur Elrod house in Palm Springs, California, but promised the former owner that they would not change it in any way. Rugs, appliances, even ashtrays and a candy dish were left in place for years; the house is still considered "an incredible time capsule" of mid-century modern decor.

== Personal life ==
Frances Ferris married twice; her first husband was writer Leroy Yerxa; they married in the 1935 and had four children together before Leroy died in 1946. She remarried in 1948, to magazine editor William Lawrence Hamling. She had two more children with Hamling; they divorced in 1967, but continued to live together for some time after that. She was active in Palm Springs society, including the League of Women Voters. She also lived in Nampa, Idaho in her later years. She died in 2019, in Caldwell, Idaho at the age of 101.
