= Imagination (magazine) =

American fantasy and science fiction magazine

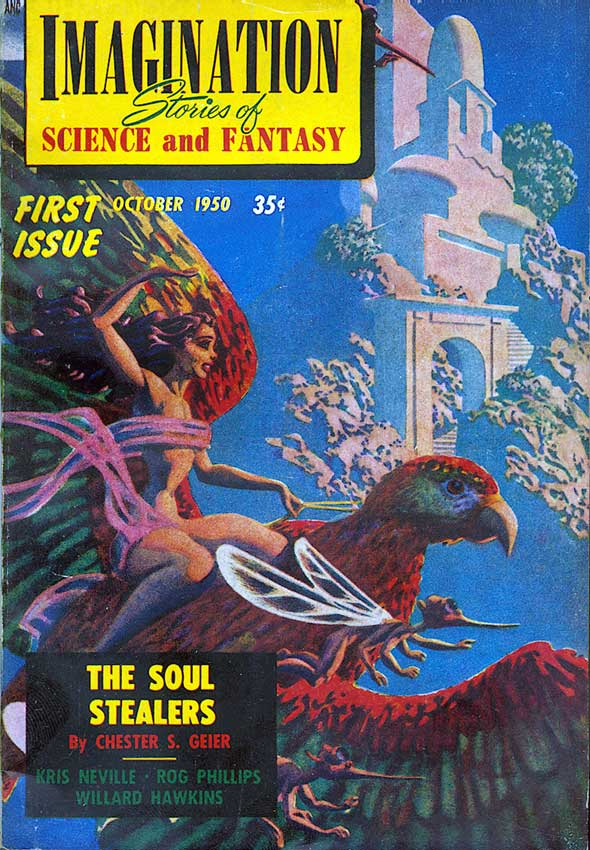
Cover of the first issue by Hannes Bok

Imagination was an American fantasy and science fiction magazine first published in October 1950 by Raymond Palmer's Clark Publishing Company. The magazine was sold almost immediately to Greenleaf Publishing Company, owned by William Hamling, who published and edited it from the third issue, February 1951, for the rest of the magazine's life. Hamling launched a sister magazine, Imaginative Tales, in 1954; both ceased publication at the end of 1958 in the aftermath of major changes in US magazine distribution due to the liquidation of American News Company.

The magazine was more successful than most of the numerous science fiction titles launched in the late 1940s and early 1950s, lasting a total of 63 issues. Despite this success, the magazine had a reputation for low-quality space opera and adventure fiction, and modern literary historians refer to it in dismissive terms. Hamling consciously adopted an editorial policy oriented toward entertainment, asserting in an early issue that "science fiction was never meant to be an educational tour de force". Few of the stories from Imagination have received recognition, but it did publish Robert Sheckley's first professional sale, "Final Examination", in the May 1952 issue, and also printed fiction by Philip K. Dick, Robert A. Heinlein and John Wyndham.

== History ==
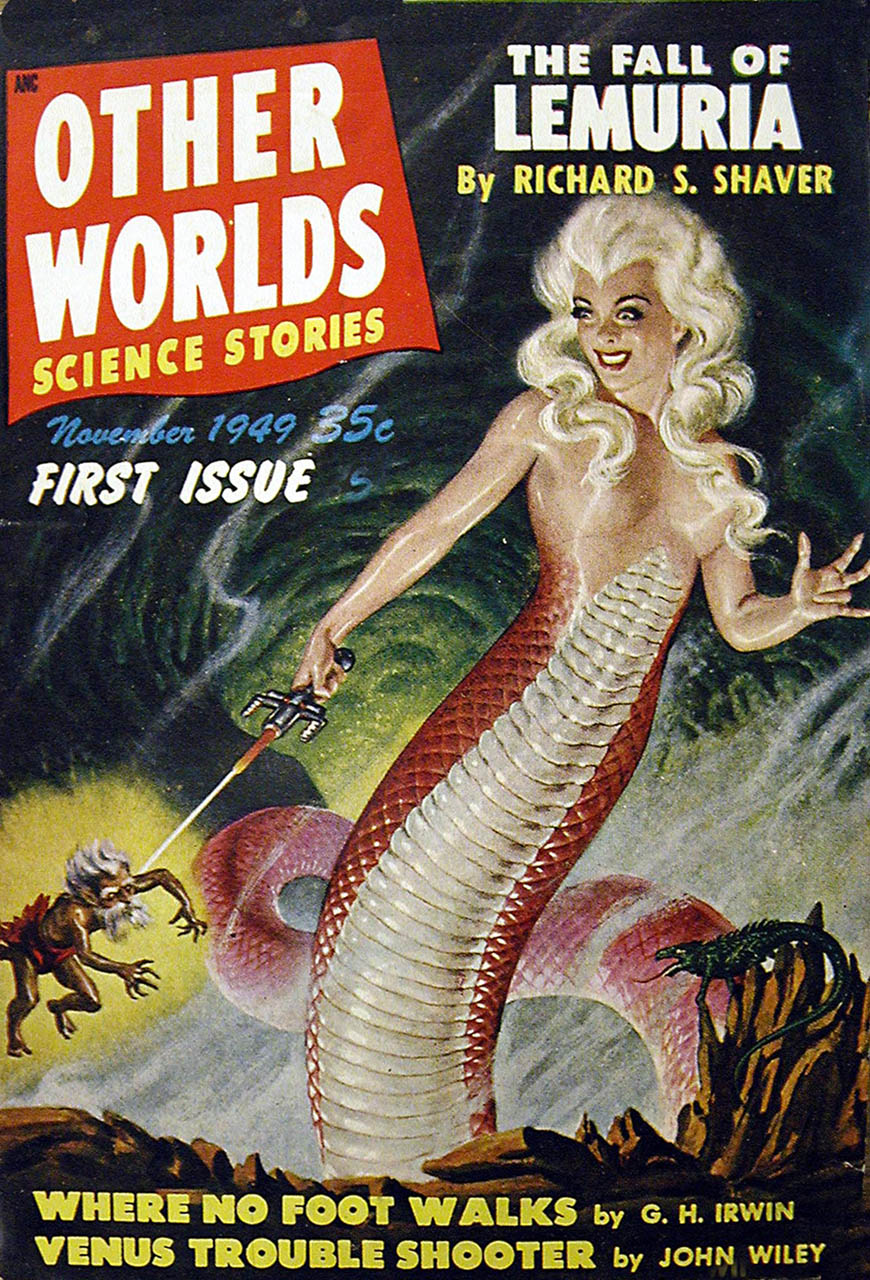
The first issue of Other Worlds, Imagination's stable-mate at Clark Publishing

American science fiction magazines first appeared in the 1920s with the appearance of Amazing Stories, a pulp magazine published by Hugo Gernsback. The beginnings of science fiction as a separately marketed genre can be traced to this time, and by the end of the 1930s the field was undergoing its first boom, but World War II and its attendant paper shortages led to the demise of several titles. By the late 1940s the market began to recover again. From a low of eight active magazines in 1946, the field expanded to 20 in 1950, and a further 22 had commenced publication by 1954. Imagination was launched in the middle of this publishing boom.

The groundwork was laid in 1947, when Clark Publishing, the company that would publish the first issue of Imagination, was incorporated in Evanston, Illinois, by Raymond Palmer. He worked for Ziff-Davis as the editor of Amazing Stories and did not leave until the end of 1949, but he launched two magazines under the Clark name before that date: Fate, in the spring of 1948, and Other Worlds, the first issue of which was dated November 1949. Both of these magazines listed their editor as "Robert N. Webster", a pseudonym Palmer adopted while he was still at Ziff-Davis because of the conflict of interest. The second issue of Other Worlds reported that Webster and Palmer were going to edit together; by the third issue, dated March 1950, the pretense had been dropped and although there was no masthead listing the editor, the editorial was simply signed "Rap" (for "Raymond A. Palmer"). At the 1949 World Science Fiction Convention in Cincinnati, held over the weekend of 3–5 September, Palmer announced that he had left Ziff-Davis and described his plans for Clark Publishing. He also met and hired Bea Mahaffey, a 21-year-old science fiction fan attending her first convention, as his assistant editor.

With Fate and Other Worlds launched, Palmer began to plan for a new magazine, to be called Imagination. Material for the first two issues had been assembled by mid-1950, but in the early summer Palmer fell down his basement stairs and was left paralyzed from the waist down. While he was hospitalized, much of the work of editing both Other Worlds and Imagination was done by Mahaffey, who coped well, despite her inexperience. An assistant, Marge Budwig Saunder, was hired to read the slush pile and help out. The magazine's first issue, dated October 1950 on a planned bi-monthly schedule, appeared on news stands 1 August 1950. However, in September that year, Ziff-Davis made the decision to move to New York from Chicago; Palmer promptly contacted William Hamling, who did not want to relocate and suggested that Hamling take over Imagination. Like Palmer, Hamling had made preparations to leave Ziff-Davis by establishing a separate publishing company, Greenleaf Publishing, and in November 1950 Hamling left Ziff-Davis and became Imagination's editor and publisher.

In 1954 Hamling started a companion magazine, Imaginative Tales; in addition, his company Greenleaf Publishing was the publisher of Rogue, a men's magazine modelled after Playboy. In 1957 the liquidation of American News Company, a major distributor, meant that many magazines had to scramble to find new distributors. Independent distributors often required that the magazines be monthly, and that they be in a larger format than the digest-size common in science fiction magazines. The larger format required higher revenue to be profitable, but in many cases it proved impossible to attract the additional advertising income that would have kept the magazines afloat. By the end of 1958, many titles had disappeared as a result, with Imagination one of the victims; Hamling closed down both Imagination and its sister magazine to invest the money in Rogue instead. The last issue of Imagination was October 1958, the 63rd issue, while Imaginative Tales, retitled Space Travel, ceased with the November 1958 issue. There was no indication in either magazine that the end had come, though the last issue of Imagination omitted its letter, book review and pen-pal columns, all of which had appeared regularly in prior issues.

Circulation figures were not required to be published annually until the 1960s, so the actual circulation figures are not known. For comparison, the more successful Magazine of Fantasy and Science Fiction, which had been launched the previous year, is known to have had a circulation of just under 60,000 copies for its first issue, dated Fall 1949.

== Contents and reception ==
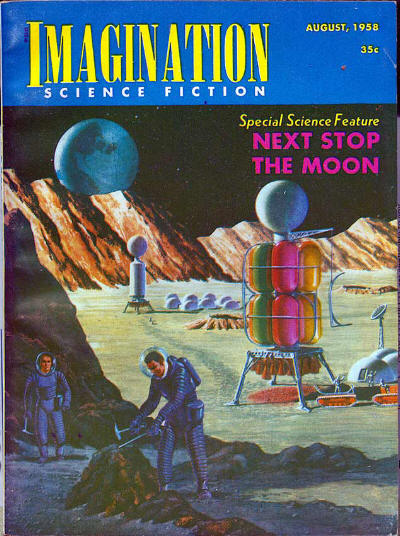
The August 1958 issue of Imagination

The cover story for the first issue was "The Soul Stealers" by Chester S. Geier, a regular in the Ziff-Davis magazines Amazing Stories and Fantastic Adventures. The story was a science fantasy tale of Leeta, a beautiful woman from another dimension stealing the souls of men to try to save her father. The cover illustration, by Hannes Bok, showed Leeta on her flying steed. Other contributors included Rog Phillips, another prolific magazine author, and Kris Neville, whose first story had been published only the year before. Neville's work appeared regularly in the first few years of the magazine; other prolific contributors included Dwight V. Swain, Daniel F. Galouye and Milton Lesser. Edmond Hamilton's work also appeared frequently towards the end of the magazine's life. The magazine often contained a long novel as the lead attraction.

In addition to less well-known regulars, some more prominent writers occasionally appeared. Ray Bradbury's "The Fire Balloons" was published in the April 1951 issue, under the title "'…In This Sign'"; the story was later incorporated into Bradbury's fixups, The Martian Chronicles and The Illustrated Man. Robert Sheckley's first story, "Final Examination", appeared in the May 1952 issue. Other well-known authors who were published in Imagination include Poul Anderson, John Wyndham (as "John Beynon"), James Blish, Philip K. Dick, Harlan Ellison, Robert A. Heinlein, Frederik Pohl and Robert Silverberg.

Imagination is generally thought of by historians of science fiction as one of the weaker magazines of the 1950s, despite its relative longevity. Donald Tuck, in his Encyclopedia of Science Fiction and Fantasy, dismissed the novels it published, saying, "not many were noteworthy, most being in the interplanetary/space opera/adventure field", and Brian Stableford, a science fiction writer and critic, described it as dealing "primarily in routine space opera." James Blish, writing under the pseudonym "William Atheling, Jr.", which he used for some of his critical writing, remarked that it was a "widely unread" magazine. Hamling's editorial policy was consciously slanted against intellectualism. In the November 1951 issue he commented that "science fiction was never meant to be an educational tour de force. The so-called adult story is nothing more than an attempt to show the reader how dumb he is and how smart the editor is." Imagination's approach, he said, was to publish entertainment: "What we need is a little relaxation. And entertaining reading is one way to get it." Some readers agreed with Hamling; a 1952 issue of Rhodomagnetic Digest, a fanzine, contains approving commentary on Hamling's editorial by Gregg Calkins, a fan of the period.

Starting with the April 1951 issue, a regular column on science fiction fandom began, titled "Fandora's Box". It was written by Mari Wolf, an active fan, for five years, and was taken over by Robert Bloch from June 1956 through the end. The column had an excellent reputation, and was one of the few such columns in the American science fiction professional magazines. Every issue carried an editorial, and a letter column appeared in every issue but the very last. A book review column began in June 1953, and appeared in every issue except the last one. It was initially by Mark Reinsberg, and was taken over by Henry Bott in May 1954 after two months in which both reviewers contributed to the column. A "Cosmic Pen Club" column, where fans could post requests for pen-pals, began in February 1957; as with the book reviews it appeared regularly, excepting only the last issue. Beginning in September 1951, the inside front cover was often used for an "Introducing the Author" feature, with short pieces by and about a writer or artist who appeared in the issue. These included photographs of the authors in question, a feature not typically found in other magazines. Among the authors featured were Heinlein, Evan Hunter and Philip K. Dick. "Introducing the Author" skipped four issues from October 1954 to January 1955, and ceased altogether with the April 1956 issue. One issue, May 1953, included pictures from that year's World Science Fiction in Chicago, rather than a feature about an author. The most frequently appearing cover artists were Harold W. McCauley, Lloyd Rognan, Malcolm Smith and William Terry.

== Bibliographic details ==
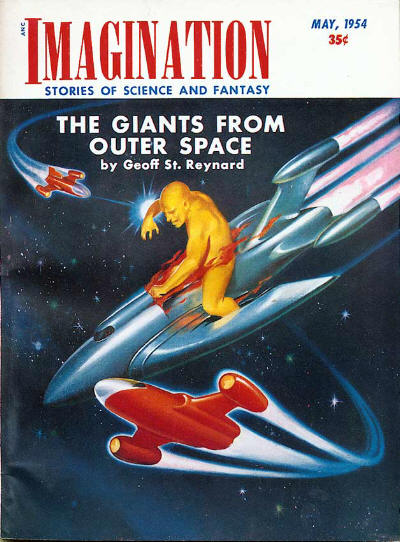
The Giants From Outer Space, May 1954

Imagination was digest size. The volume number rose by one at the start of each calendar year, regardless of the number of issues. Volume 1, 1950, contained only two issues; subsequent volumes contained five to twelve issues, depending on frequency of publication. The first issue had a publication date of October 1950, and the schedule was bimonthly through the September 1952 issue except that June 1951 was followed by September 1951. The next four issues were dated October 1952, December 1952, January 1953 and February 1953, and then a monthly run began with April 1953 that lasted without a break until the July 1955 issue. The next issue was October 1955, which inaugurated another bimonthly period that ran with perfect regularity until the last issue, October 1958. The price remained at 35 cents throughout.

The title of the magazine was initially "Imagination: Stories of Science and Fantasy"; it changed with the October 1955 issue to "Imagination: Science Fiction", though this change was only on the cover and spine and was never reflected on the masthead.

The first 28 issues were 166 pages long. The page count dropped to 134 with the April 1954 issue and stayed at that length for the remainder of the run. The cover layout initially strongly resembled that of Other Worlds but was changed with the fifth issue, June 1951, to have a white background banner for the title. This format was retained for the rest of the magazine's life, with occasional slight variations such as using a different color for the banner background. The spine also changed from a colored spine with pale lettering, which was similar to the spine style used by Other Worlds, to a white spine with red or blue lettering.

The publisher was Clark Publishing Company for the first two issues. The editor for those issues was Raymond Palmer, but as he was hospitalized much of the work was done by Bea Mahaffey. As a result, these two issues are sometimes indexed with Mahaffey as editor. With the third issue, Greenleaf Publishing Company became the publisher and William Hamling took over as editor, a position he retained throughout the magazine's life.

== Sources ==
- Ashley, Michael (1976). The History of the Science Fiction Magazine Vol. 3 1946–1955. Chicago: Contemporary Books, Inc. ISBN 0-8092-7842-1.
- Ashley, Michael (1978). The History of the Science Fiction Magazine Part 4 1956–1965. London: New English Library. ISBN 0-450-03438-0.
- Ashley, Mike (2005). Transformations: The Story of the Science Fiction Magazines from 1950 to 1970. Liverpool: Liverpool University Press. ISBN 0-85323-779-4.
- Atheling Jr., William (1974). More Issues at Hand. Chicago: Advent: Publishers, Inc. ISBN 0-911682-18-X.
- Edwards, Malcolm; Nicholls, Peter (1993). "Astounding Science-Fiction". In Clute, John (ed.). The Encyclopedia of Science Fiction. New York: St. Martin's Press. pp. 62–65. ISBN 0-312-09618-6.
- Edwards, Malcolm; Nicholls, Peter (1993). "SF Magazines". In Clute, John (ed.). The Encyclopedia of Science Fiction. New York: St. Martin's Press. pp. 1066–1071. ISBN 0-312-09618-6.
- Nicholls, Peter; Clute, John (1993). "Genre SF". In Clute, John; Nicholls, Peter (eds.). The Encyclopedia of Science Fiction. New York: St. Martin's Press. pp. 483–484. ISBN 0-312-09618-6.
- Sanders, Joe (1985). "Imagination". In Tymn, Marshall; Ashley, Mike (eds.). Science Fiction, Fantasy, and Weird Fiction Magazines. Westport, Connecticut: Greenwood Press. pp. 343–347. ISBN 0-313-21221-X.
- Stableford, Brian (1993). "Amazing Stories". In Clute, John (ed.). The Encyclopedia of Science Fiction. New York: St. Martin's Press. pp. 25–27. ISBN 0-312-09618-6.
- Stableford, Brian (1993). "Imagination". In Clute, John (ed.). The Encyclopedia of Science Fiction. New York: St. Martin's Press. p. 615. ISBN 0-312-09618-6.
- Tuck, Donald H. (1982). The Encyclopedia of Science Fiction and Fantasy. Vol. 3. Chicago: Advent: Publishers, Inc. ISBN 0-911682-26-0.
