= Yerxa =

Yerxa may refer to:

- Cabot Abram Yerxa (1883-1965), builder of Cabot's Pueblo Museum in Desert Hot Springs, California
- Donald A. Yerxa (born 1950), author co-director of The Historical Society at Boston University
- Frances Yerxa, American science fiction writer and editor
- John Yerxa (1904–1967), an American politician
- Leo Yerxa, a Canadian visual artist and writer
- Michael Yerxa, a Canadian documentary filmmaker
- Ron Yerxa (born 1947), American film producer
- Rufus Yerxa (born 1951), Deputy Director-General of the World Trade Organization

== See also ==
- Maribel Yerxa Owen, American figure skater
- Maribel Yerxa Vinson, American figure skater and coach
