= William Hamling (publisher) =

American writer, editor, and publisher

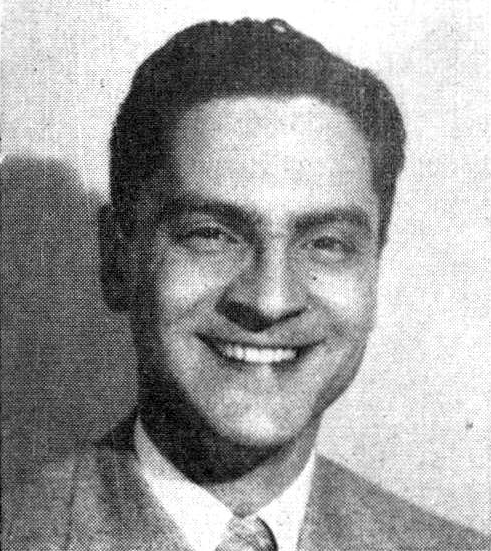
William L. Hamling c. 1954

William Lawrence Hamling (June 14, 1921 – June 29, 2017) was an American writer, science fiction fan, and publisher of both science fiction digests, and adult magazines and books, active from the late 1930s until 1975. He was a lifelong member of First Fandom.

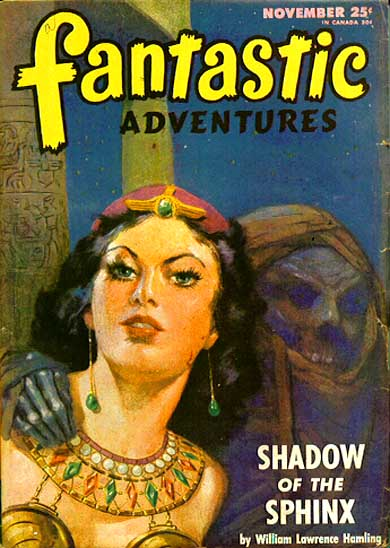
Hamling's "Shadow of the Sphinx" was illustrated by J. Allen St. John

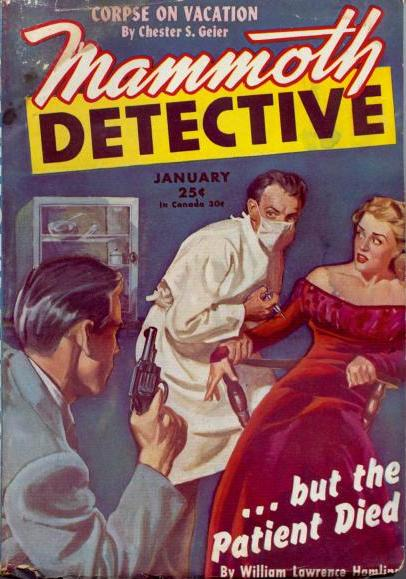
Hamling's "But the Patient Died" was the cover story for the January 1946 issue of Mammoth Detective

== The early years ==
Hamling was born in Chicago, Illinois, on June 14, 1921. His father was a railroad man who worked for the Illinois Central Railroad.

Hamling attended the St. Hilary's grammar school, a parochial school in Chicago, where he received his elementary education and graduated after completing the eighth grade. Four years later, in 1939, he graduated from Lane Technical High School in Chicago, one of the largest schools in the country, with over 9,000 students at that time, where he received both a vocational and general education. Hamling had just turned 18. In 1940, he entered the University of Chicago, but left school less than a year later because he had already begun to write fiction and was selling a great deal of the material that he wrote. He was still living at home, and for a time, to please his father, he had gone to work for the Milwaukee Railroad as a clerk, ostensibly to learn the railroad business. However, he had begun to make writing his life's work and did not stay with the railroad for very long.

His first sale as a writer was the science fiction story, "War with Jupiter," a collaboration with fellow Lane Technical High School classmate, Mark Reinsberg. Reinsberg and another friend of Hamling's, and fellow Lane Tech classmate, Melvin Korshak, would go on to found Shasta Publishers.

In 1942, Hamling was drafted into the United States Army as a private but was thereafter sent to a pre-officer candidate school. Later, Hamling was sent to an officer candidate school, graduated, and was commissioned as a second lieutenant. The army then sent Hamling to further schooling, where he became a motor maintenance officer, still with the rank of lieutenant. Hamling was scheduled to be attached to the Fourth Division, a division that was later to go into Normandy, but while he was on a combat exercise in the United States, Hamling sustained an accident in the field with a land mine and was later hospitalized with an ear problem. Thereafter, Hamling was retired from service for medical reasons, and he received an honorable discharge in 1944.

== Stardust ==
In 1940, Hamling published five issues of a semi-professional science fiction magazine, titled Stardust. It carried fiction by well-known professionals such as L. Sprague de Camp, Robert Moore Williams and Jack Williamson, and was much more impressive than most magazines produced by fans. Science fiction historian Sam Moskowitz suggests that it was produced as part to support the Chicago bid for the 1940 Worldcon, an annual science fiction convention. The bid was successful, and the fourth issue went on sale at the convention in Chicago, but only one more issue appeared. Hamling claimed that the circulation reached almost a thousand copies, but evidently it was too expensive to be continued.

== Early writing career ==
On his return to Chicago, Hamling resumed writing and selling fiction. He wrote various forms of fiction, including science fiction, westerns, mysteries, and detective and adventure stories. Many of these were published in Chicago-based Ziff-Davis Publishing Company magazines such as Amazing Stories, Fantastic Adventures, Mammoth Western, South Sea Stories. In January 1946, Hamling became an assistant editor at Ziff-Davis. During his five years with Ziff-Davis he eventually became managing editor of the company's fiction magazines.

While Hamling was with the Ziff-Davis Publishing Company he met a man named Leroy Yerxa, from whom he purchased on behalf of the company fiction material which Yerxa wrote on assignment. Yerxa's wife Frances also wrote for the company. Her writing was more in the factual areas, articles on various fields of science. Leroy died in 1946. In 1948 Hamling married Frances.

Frances was born in Eaton Rapids, Michigan. She had four children from her previous marriage. The Hamlings had two more children.

In the 1940s Hamling saw his first novels published. His Shadow of the Sphinx is a horror novel about an ancient Egyptian sorceress. First published during the 1940s in Fantastic Adventures, it was described by Lin Carter as "the best story of its kind I read in many a moon. The character of Zaleikka was done to perfection. This is the type of yarn we have all too few of nowadays."

== Greenleaf Publishing Company ==
In 1950 Ziff-Davis decided to transfer operations to New York City. Hamling decided to stay in Chicago. Hamling then organized Greenleaf Publishing Company in Chicago. The company was also known as Greenleaf Classics, Reed Enterprises, Corinth Publications, Regency Publications, Blake Pharmaceuticals, Phenix Publishing and Freedom Publishing. Their first publication was Imagination. His wife worked closely with him in the early years of his publishing company.

Imagination published its first issue in October 1950. From its inception, Hamling was the editor and publisher, and Ray Palmer the front. Although Hamling credits Palmer as the editor in response to a letter in the February 1951 issue of Fantastic Adventures, the last issue of that magazine which Hamling edited. Hamling was to become notorious for the layers of insulation he kept between his activities, his fronts, and even between himself and co-workers and employees.

With the third issue Imagination became an "official" Greenleaf property, as too Imaginative Tales when it was launched in September 1954.

According to L. Sprague de Camp's 1953 Science-Fiction Handbook, Hamling was at that time a "slim, dark man who looks too young to be not only an independent publisher but also the father of five."

== Rogue ==
The Greenleaf Publishing Company initially published science fiction magazines and a spectrum of similar publications, and it was not until November 1955 that Greenleaf published the first issue of Rogue (although it had a cover date of December), a magazine which was competitive with Playboy.

About Playboy and Hugh Hefner, Hamling states in a letter to his friend, and lawyer, Stanley Fleishman: "I remember my friend Hugh Hefner coming to me in 1953 to propose an idea for a magazine to be called Playboy. Hef was talented but poor and his passion had been fantasy. He was a struggling cartoonist and had been working in a clerical capacity at Esquire. I had been buying fantasy cartoons from him for several years (they were so bad I never published them but he needed the money and to this day we have a running routine where I threaten to issue them as a nostalgic bonanza but defer to his pleadings of personal embarrassment) and one evening he and his charming wife, Millie [Mildred Williams], visited Fran and me and I responded to his suggestion of Playboy with the remark, 'Hef, you can't sell sex to the American public.' Today Hef is still talented but he is no longer poor. My quote has since become a standard joke in the fourth estate.

"...That night brought another turning point in my life. While I refused financial participation in Playboy (the greatest economic error in publishing history) I helped him secure authors and artists and indeed over the early years actually provided a training school for his editorial and art personnel. I trained the editors and he hired them away..."

Greenleaf, then, published Rogue and a photographic magazine in book form called Model Art, as well as different numbers of science fiction publications. Rogue began much as Imagination had before it, the Hamling basement in Evanston, Illinois. Hamling and his wife sat side by side and worked on it together.

Rogue was distributed by Empire News, and in 1955 attempts were made by the Post Office to ban it. The services of Thurman Arnold, Abe Fortas, and Paul Porter were obtained to represent it. In the district court of Washington, D.C. an injunction was granted against the government, and the magazine received the right to use the mails. The adjudication took place in 1957. Second class mailing privileges were granted.

Hamling was the editor and publisher, his wife, Frances, was executive editor.

In 1958, business at Rogue was so good that both Imagination and Imaginative Tales were no longer needed in order to make Hamling money, and the offices were moved from the Hamling basement to the Graphics Arts Building in Evanston. Coupled with the recent liquidation of the major US distributor for magazines, American News Company, Hamling ceased publication of his science fiction digests and began to concentrate solely on Rogue.

== The adult paperback empire ==
In 1959, Hamling started publishing paperback novels. Originally, these novels were published under the trade name of Nightstand Books, Midnight Reader, and Regency Books. Nightstand Books was an imprint for paperback original sex novels by authors working under house names. (Later imprints included Leisure Books, Ember Library, Midnight Readers, and others). Still later, books were published under the trade name of Greenleaf Classics.

In 1959, Harlan Ellison, along with his wife Charlotte [Stein], moved to Evanston where Harlan was employed by William Hamling at Rogue. Ellison had returned to Chicago, to set up William Hamling's black box operation for publishing pornography under the false front company of Blake Pharmaceuticals, housed in the offices next door to the headquarters for Rogue. The "black box operation" was how they received manuscripts secretly provided for by the Scott Meredith Literary Agency.

Writing and editing for William Hamling's Rogue magazine was the "story" to cover Ellison's real activities. Ellison started Blake, did six titles in 1959, and then walked away from the job cold without notice. Hamling followed him to New York City and bribed him to come back, continue with Blake, and he was given the bonus of editing books for Hamling's Regency Books.

Under the Regency imprint Hamling published novels and anthologies by writers such as B. Traven, Kurt Vonnegut, Robert Bloch, Philip José Farmer, and Clarence Cooper Jr. He also published pornography created by Robert Silverberg and Harlan Ellison. Ellison arranged for Algis Budrys to be his assistant but in reality was setting Budrys up to take over and had plans to again walk away cold without notice. However, Budrys blew Ellison's plans away by telling Hamling what Ellison was about to do. Hamling fired Ellison, and replaced him with Budrys (who hired Earl Kemp as his assistant in 1961). After this internal reorganization Hamling paid Ellison to write back cover blurbs for Nightstand Books, and then cut him off cold. With Ellison out of the way Hamling had the blurbs written by the Blake staff, then numbering about four (Kemp among them), not counting his stepson Eddie Yerxa.

In 1964 Hamling moved his family to Palm Springs. When Hamling first moved to California, Greenleaf continued to publish the magazines. A subsequently formed corporation, Corinth, published paperback books, and Reed Enterprises was organized to do the distribution. Later, in 1966 and 1967 the book and magazine publishing were consolidated under the Greenleaf banner and Corinth was liquidated, so there remained Greenleaf and Reed Enterprises, only.

From 1961 on his primary editor was Earl_Kemp. Pseudonymous writers for Kemp/Hamling included Lawrence Block, Marion Zimmer Bradley, Harlan Ellison, Evan Hunter, Robert Silverberg, Arnold Hano, and Donald E. Westlake.

== First Amendment Supreme Court trials ==
Other than the Rogue litigation, the only other litigation which Hamling became involved in prior to his 1971 indictment was in 1966, when there was an indictment returned in the district court in Houston, Texas, charging violations of the obscenity law with respect to seven novels Hamling had published. There was a hung jury in that case and after a mistrial was declared, the case was transferred to San Diego. Finally, in 1971, when the indictment in the Illustrated Report was returned, the government moved to dismiss the Houston case and it was dismissed with prejudice. The dismissal followed rulings by the Supreme Court of the United States that books virtually identical to those involved in the Houston case were not obscene. See, Redrup v. New York, 386 U.S. 767; Corinth Publications, Inc. v. Wesberry, 388 U.S. 448; A Quantity of Copies of Books v. Kansas, 388 U.S. 452; Books, Inc. v. United States, 388 U.S. 449.

Hamling helped finance the defense of bookstore clerk Robert Redrup. His appeal of his conviction on obscenity charges for selling two Greenleaf Books (Lust Pool and Shame Agent) in 1965 went to the Supreme Court of the United States, where it was overturned in Redrup v. New York in 1967.

During the Nixon Administration, Hamling published an illustrated edition of the Presidential Report of the Commission on Obscenity and Pornography. The book was "replete with the sort of photographs the commission examined." Hamling and editor Earl Kemp were given prison sentences for distributing the book, but served only the federal minimum. It has been suggested that this prosecution was in part retaliation for Hamling and Kemp's part in Redrup v. New York. The story of their arrest and prison time was covered in Gay Talese's Thy Neighbor's Wife (1980).

On September 18, 1970, Charles Keating, the head and founder of the Citizens for Decent Literature, and President Richard Nixon's only appointee to the eighteen-member panel commissioned by former president Lyndon Johnson to produce the report, disputed the findings and petitioned a federal court in Washington, D.C., to issue a temporary restraining order preventing the publication of the final report, which called for the legalization of all pornography in the United States. He failed.

The 1969 President's Commission on Obscenity and Pornography issued its un-illustrated 656-page report on September 30, 1970. One month later, the report went on sale at the Government Printing Office. On November 11, 1970, copies of Greenleaf Classics' 352-page The Illustrated Presidential Report of the Commission on Obscenity and Pornography were published, and two weeks later, on Monday, December 13, 1970, went on sale throughout the U.S. for $12.50.

Three months later, on Tuesday, March 8, 1971, four officers of three San Diego companies were arraigned on charges that they used the U.S. mail to sell an unauthorized, and allegedly obscene, version of the report of the President's Commission on Obscenity and Pornography. The indictments were announced in Washington, D.C., by the current U.S. Attorney General, John N. Mitchell. He gleefully announced, "They are the result of a three-month investigation by the Postal Inspection Service and the FBI."

Named in the original anti-Illustrated Report indictments were Greenleaf Classics, Inc., Library Services, Inc., and Reed Enterprises. Twenty of the indictment charges dealt with violating postal laws by mailing obscene books and advertisements, and the final one was a count of conspiracy to violate the laws. Hamling, Greenleaf, and Reed were also charged with two counts of shipping obscene matter by truck from San Diego to Dallas. The indictments were reported in the Sunday, March 6, 1971, edition of the San Diego Union newspaper.

Of the 21 indictments that were handed down they were only convicted on those pertaining to mailing an advertising brochure (plus the one conspiracy count). Hamling stood up in court and testified that he — and he alone — was the only one who knew about this brochure, that he personally created it, and he had it mailed out under his command.

However, Hamling standing up and taking the fall was not enough and they all were convicted. Hamling received a four-year sentence. Earl Kemp received a sentence of three years and one day. The report as published by Greenleaf was not found to be obscene. The brochure was found to be obscene by the jury. Earl Kemp was in Europe at the time Hamling created and mailed the ad brochure.

On June 21, 1973, following the Supreme Court of the United States decision in Miller v. California, 413 U.S. 15, Hamling immediately ceased publishing works with pictorial content and withdrew from the marketplace vast numbers of such books which had been distributed prior to that date. The pictorial books which were withdrawn from the market had a retail value of approximately $900,000.

On Monday, June 24, 1974, the Supreme Court of the United States, after Greenleaf lawyer Stanley Fleishman argued to overturn the Greenleaf conviction, in a 5–4 ruling, upheld the lower courts' verdict. "It's hell to go to jail knowing I'm an honorable man," said Hamling to Los Angeles Times newspaper reporter Gregg Kilday in an interview following the Supreme Court announcement.

"Justice Black was sitting at the time the brochure for the book was mailed... The one vote would have been different... I would not be a criminal... reasonable men may differ. But Justice Black is not now sitting, therefore I am a criminal, consigned to the limbo of convict life and brand. How does one adjust to this? A question of personal taste and legal ambiguity that swings the scales of justice 5 to 4 either way, as capricious as the changing wind at sunset. The sunset of my personal life and professional career."

On Monday, January 5, 1976, after being out on bond (William Hamling's bond was $15,000, and Earl Kemp's bond was $10,000) since their sentencing in 1972 (while they were appealing the verdict all the way to the Supreme Court of the United States) they both surrendered in the courtroom of Judge Gordon Thompson Jr. the judge who originally tried and sentenced them. They both went to prison at the Federal Correctional Institution, Terminal Island, at the same time, and both were released at the same time.

On January 5, 1976, by court order, all involvement in any aspect of producing pornography by all members indicted, charged, and convicted, and now imprisoned, ceased.

By court order they were both released on May 17, 1976. Although out of custody, the defendants' sentences were still in effect, and both received five years of probation. Hamling was also ordered to terminate any connection with Reed Enterprises and Library Services, Inc., as both had been named in the original indictments. Judge Thompson also ordered him to sell all his stock in these same organizations. Hamling was allowed to keep the real estate that housed these enterprises. Hamling was also ordered to pay a total of $87,000 in fines ($43,000 for Reed, $12,000 for Library Services, $10,000 for the conspiracy charge, and $2,000 for each of the 11 counts of mailing an obscene brochure.)

The other two Greenleaf officers, David L. Thomas (office manager and treasurer) and Shirley Wright (bookkeeper and secretary), each received five years on probation. They were both given sentences of one and a half years in prison, which were suspended when they were placed on probation.

Of the original 21 indictments, all four Greenleaf company officers and the two corporations were convicted of the same twelve counts on Monday, February 7, 1972, following a two-month jury trial. The jury deliberated for six days and was hung on the remaining nine counts.

== Publications of note ==
Hamling published gay-themed books while at Greenleaf, one of the earliest publishers to do so. Novelist Victor J. Banis, one of Hamling's authors, says that once Greenleaf proved how much of a market there was for erotic gay fiction, other publishers soon joined in.

According to Frank M. Robinson, one of the Greenleaf gay-themed books, Song of the Loon (by Richard Amory) became a million-copy-plus bestseller. "Everybody made money off Loon — except for the author, who was paid the standard price of $800, while Hamling made millions and the store owners who sold them made thousands."

== Sources ==
- de Camp, L. Sprague (1953). Science-Fiction Handbook: The Writing of Imaginative Fiction. New York: Hermitage House.
- Madle, Robert A.; Ashley, Mike (1985). "Stardust (1940)". In Tymn, Marshall B.; Ashley, Mike (eds.). Science Fiction, Fantasy and Weird Fiction Magazines. Westport, Connecticut: Greenwood Press. pp. 606–607. ISBN 0-3132-1221-X.
- Warner, Harry (1971) [1969]. All Our Yesterdays: An Informal History of Science Fiction Fandom in the Forties. New York: Advent: Publishers, Inc.
