= The Turning Wheel =

1954 novelette by Philip K. Dick

"The Turning Wheel" is a novelette by American science fiction writer Philip K. Dick. It was published in Science Fiction Stories No. 2, 1954.

== Plot ==
The story is set in a post-apocalyptic future where global civilization is governed by a hierarchical, religious society centered on belief in karmic based reincarnation metaphorically viewed as moving forward or backward on a turning wheel.

The society presented is class driven, apparently with Caucasians ("Caucs") at the bottom, and Asians and Indians at the top. Above all is the god/messiah, the Bard "Elron Hu" (that is to say, "Elron Hu, Bard"), whose spiritual plan involves one becoming "clear" - an obvious jab at L. Ron Hubbard's Dianetics, the self-help book that had been released a few years before.

== Publication ==
This was the second of two digest size issues published by Columbia Publishing under this title to test the market for magazines in digest size. Both Science Fiction Stories No. 2, 1954 and Science Fiction Quarterly, August 1954 were copyrighted by the publisher as "Science fiction quarterly, Aug. 1954" under Registration Number B00000473931.

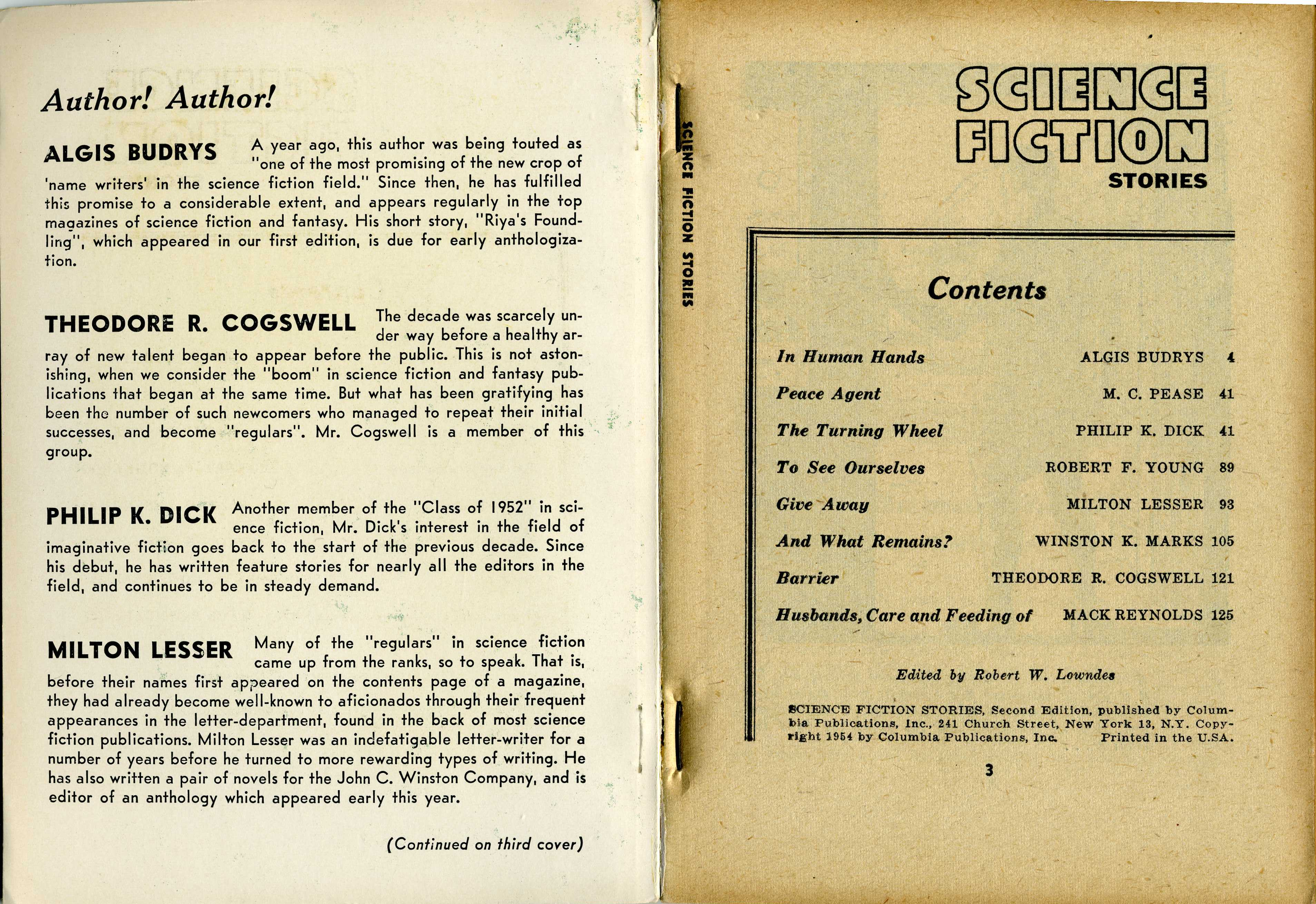
Inside front cover and table of contents of Science Fiction Stories No. 2, 1954.

Copyright protection for Science Fiction Stories, No 2, 1954 (as Science fiction quarterly, Aug. 1954) and its contents was created under Registration Number B00000473931. "The Turning Wheel" is in the public domain in the United States because it was published in the United States between January 1, 1950, and December 31, 1963, but copyright was not renewed with the US Copyright Office within a year period beginning on December 31 of the 27th year of the copyright and running through December 31 of the following year. When renewal registration was not made within the statutory time limit copyright expired at the end of its first term and protection was lost permanently. After the author's death, "The Turning Wheel" was incorrectly included in renewal Registration Number RE0000190631 (1983-11-22) War veteran, and other contributions by Philip K. Dick, as "(In Science fiction stories, May 1955) The Turning wheel. Pub. 1955-03-14; B00000531302".
