= Harold W. McCauley =

American artist

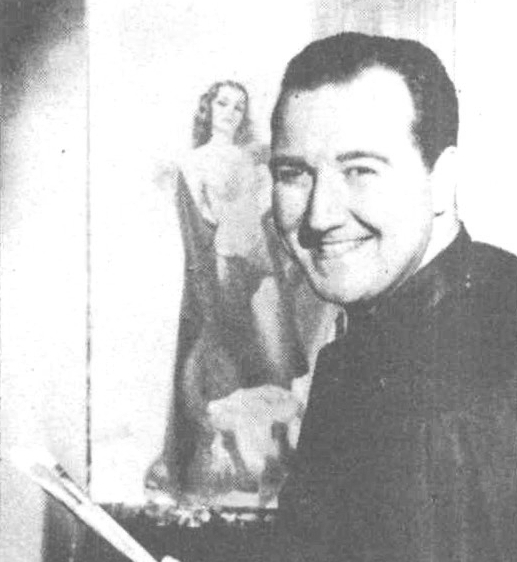
- Harold W. McCauley c.1952
- Born: July 11, 1913; Chicago, IL, United States
- Died: December 16, 1977 (aged 64); Melbourne, FL, United States
- Resting place: Fountainhead Memorial Park
- Known for: Mac Girls; science fiction, pulp magazine artist
- Spouse: Grace Lorraine Lindeman (m. 1953)

Harold William McCauley (July 11, 1913 — December 16, 1977) was an illustrator of pulp magazines in the science fiction field.

== Career ==
Harold William McCauley was born July 11, 1913.

McCauley worked for most of his life in Chicago, Illinois, where he was a frequent contributor to pulp magazines. His work includes a sensational cover for Hotrod Sinners (1962), which was authored by Robert Silverberg under the pseudonym "Don Elliot".

His most notable work, however, appeared in science fiction magazines. His portrayals of beautiful women in low-cut fashion posed dramatically while being menaced became known as "Mac girls".

One his more notable works was the cover of Amazing Stories magazine, July 1943. Editor Raymond A. Palmer was the model for the evil scientist, and Palmer's secretary posed as the futuristic woman holding a gun. In the early 1960s, writer William Hamling turned to publishing, and established Nightstand Books. Nightstand was a pioneer in gay and lesbian erotica, and much of its early work had a science fiction tone. McCauley did almost all the covers for Nightstand's books, quitting only when McCauley moved to Florida. McCauley also did illustration work for Hamling's Rogue, a sophisticated men's pornographic magazine that was a direct competitor to Playboy.

He also worked throughout the 1950s in advertising, creating illustrations for Coca-Cola, Pepsi, Orange Kist, and Schlitz Beer.

McCauley and his wife, Grace, had three children: Gary, Kim, and Erin. He died on December 16, 1977, in Melbourne, Florida.

== Gallery ==
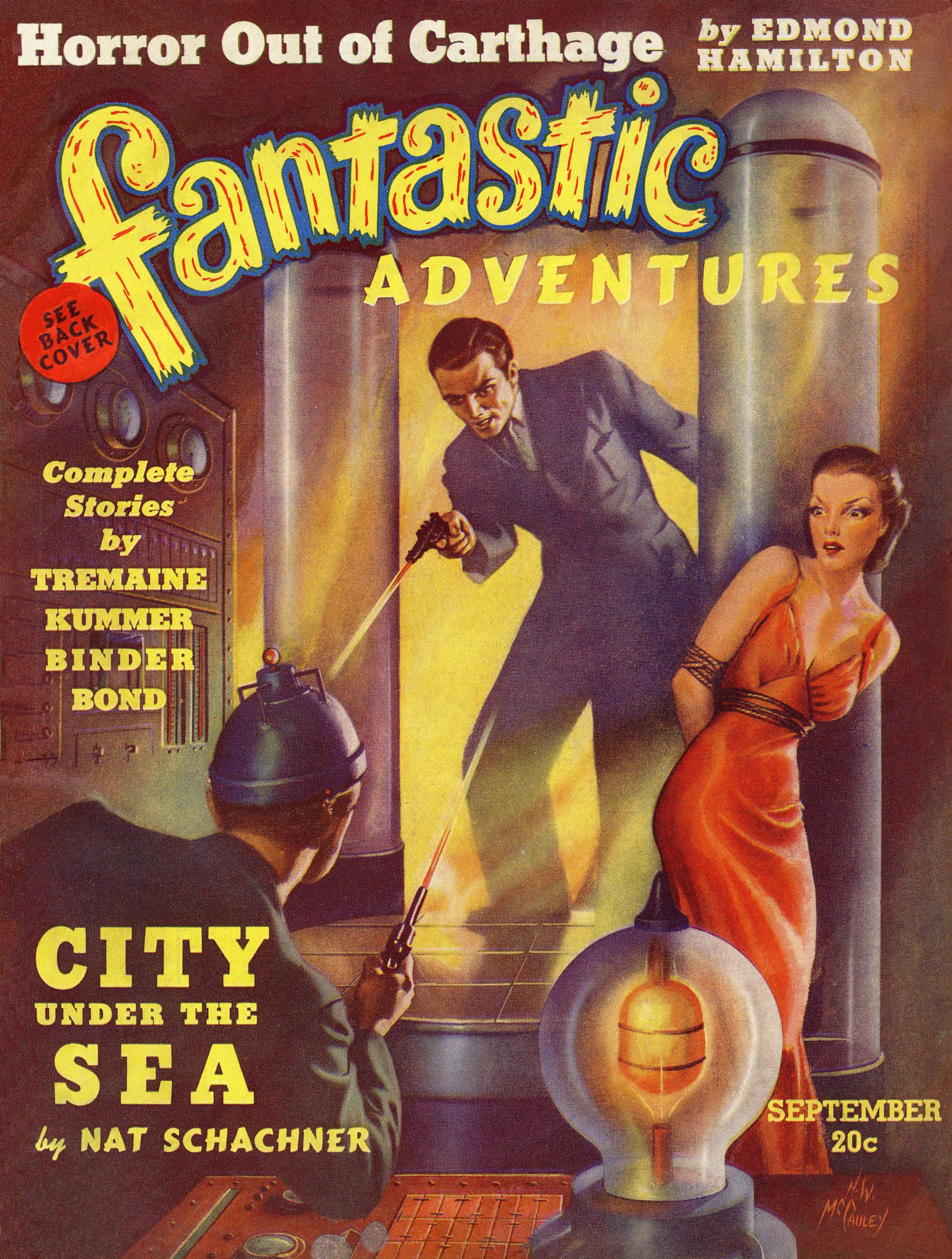

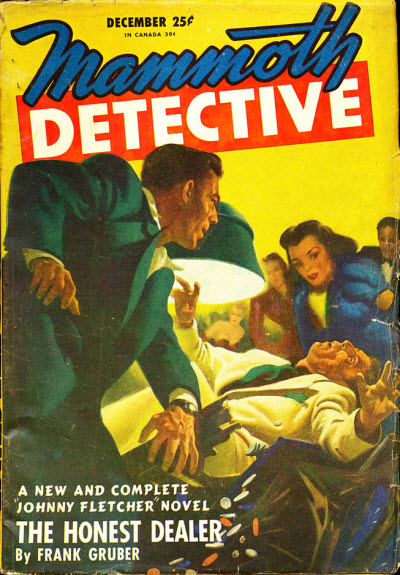

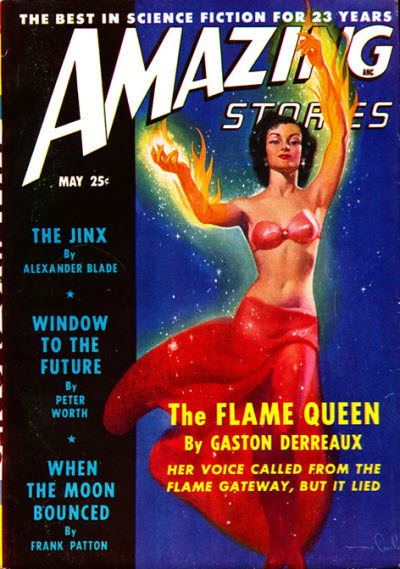

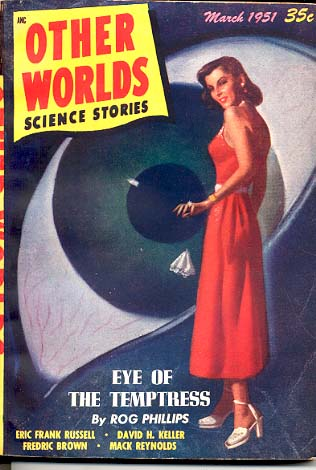

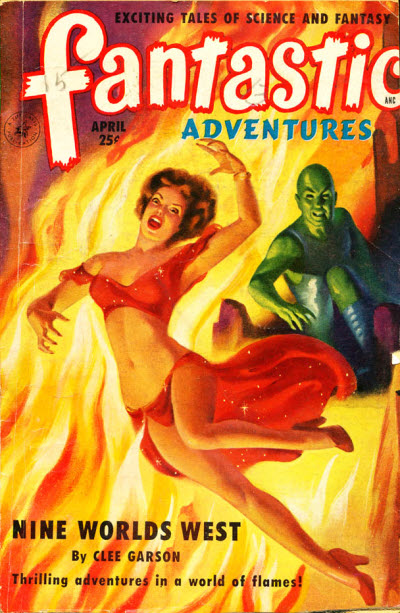

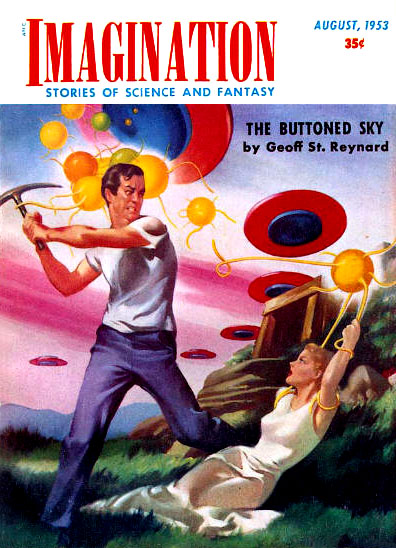

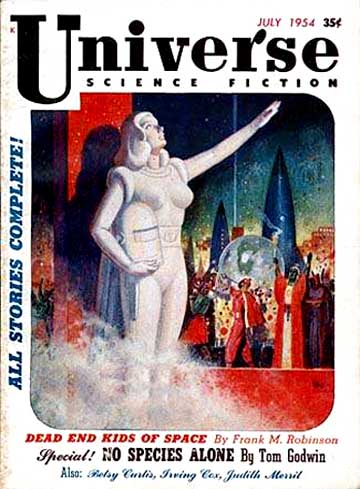

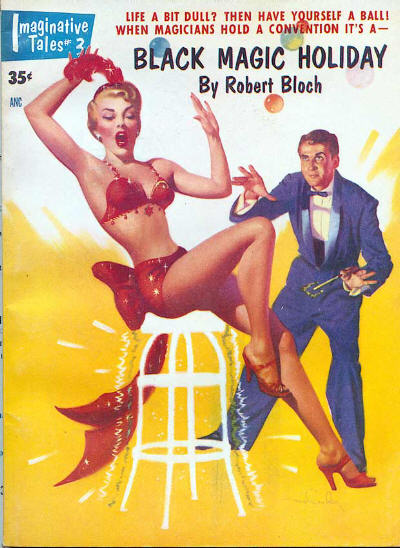

== Bibliography ==
- Nadis, Fred (2013). The Man From Mars: Ray Palmer's Amazing Pulp Journey. New York: Jeremy P. Tarcher/Penguin. ISBN 9780399160547.
