= Malcolm Smith (artist) =

American artist

Malcolm H. Smith (1910–1966) was an American artist identified with the retro-futurist tradition.

== Early life ==
Malcolm Hadden Smith was born in Memphis, Tennessee in 1910. He displayed a talent for drawing and painting at an early age. He also enjoyed reading pulp sci-fi books and was a world-class target archer, winning many trophies and medals. He studied art at Southwestern Junior College in Memphis. In his early 20s, he moved to Chicago, Illinois, and attended the American Academy of Art and the Art Institute. While attending college, Malcolm worked as a haberdasher and a cabinetmaker. After graduating from school, he immediately started work as a commercial illustrator. He did illustrations for newspapers, magazine ads, posters and billboards.

== Career ==
In the mid to late 1930s, Malcolm started working as a freelance artist for the various pulp publishers in Chicago. He did illustrations and paintings for mystery, romance, detective, western, and sci-fi pulps. He was, for a while, the art director at Ziff-Davis Publishing. At other times he worked in a Chicago-based artist's cooperative called Bendelow and Associates. Malcolm often used himself, his friends, and family members as models for his works.

In the later part of 1959, Malcolm moved his family to Huntsville, Alabama, where he worked as a concept artist and animator for the Marshall Space Flight Center of NASA. While at NASA, Malcolm worked with Fred Ordway who became the technical adviser for the Kubrick movie 2001:a Space Odyssey. Fred suggested to Arthur C. Clarke that they use Malcolm for the concept and design work for the movie. Arthur C. Clarke sent a letter to Malcolm requesting his assistance on the movie, but, at the time, Malcolm was busy illustrating a book called "In Search for Life on Other Worlds" and he was unavailable for the movie. Also in the 60s, Malcolm was asked to appear on the show "I've Got A Secret" as a famous sci-fi artist. Throughout his career he became friends with many other artists, writers, scientists and engineers including: Virgil Finlay, Ray Paul, Edgar Rice Burroughs, and Wernher von Braun. Malcolm H. Smith is considered by many Sci-Fi fans to be one of the founding fathers of this genre of art. He died in 1966 of lung cancer, and is buried in Huntsville, Alabama.

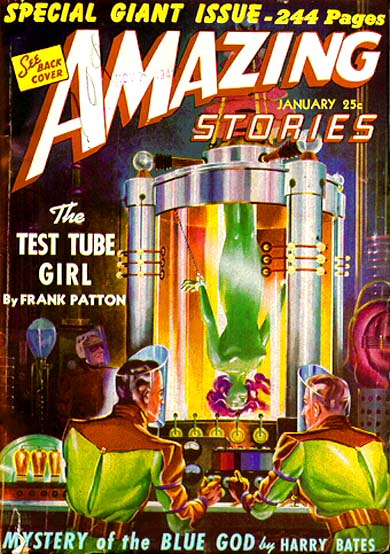
Smith's first cover for an sf magazine, Amazing Stories, January 1942

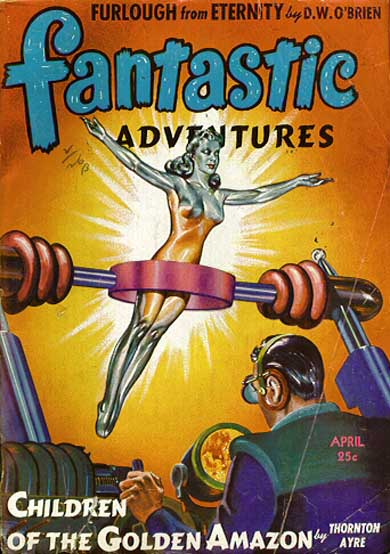
Fantastic Adventures, April 1943

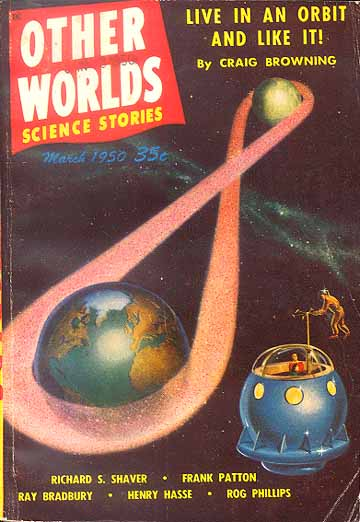
Other Worlds Science Stories, March 1950

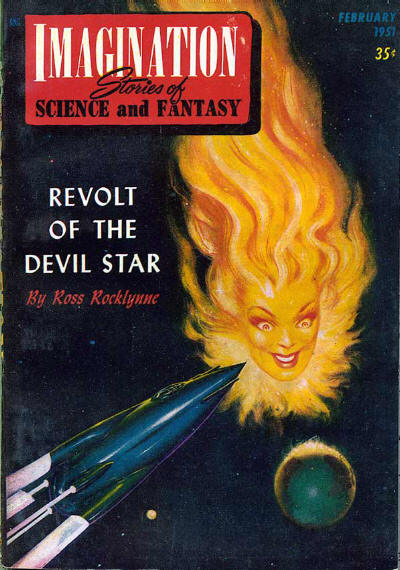
Imagination, February 1951
