= Stanley Fleishman =

American lawyer (1920–1999)

- Born: 1920; Bronx, New York City, U.S.
- Died: September 23, 1999 (aged 78–79); Los Angeles, California, U.S.
- Education: University of Georgia; Brooklyn College; LL.B. Columbia University School of Law (1944)
- Occupation: Attorney · First Amendment defender · Disability rights advocate
- Years active: 1946–1999
- Known for: Defense in landmark U.S. obscenity cases (e.g. Deep Throat, Tropic of Cancer); Supreme Court First Amendment arguments; disability rights litigation
- Spouse: Doris Fleishman
- Children: 3
- Awards: Hugh M. Hefner First Amendment Award for Lifetime Achievement; William O. Douglas First Amendment Award; Independent Living Center Freedom Isn't Free Award

Stanley Fleishman (1920–1999) was an American attorney best known for his expertise in the constitutional defense of the First Amendment in obscenity cases and for his advocacy on behalf of the disabled community.

== Early life ==
Stanley Fleishman was born in the Bronx, New York in 1920, and grew up in Queens, New York. His father was an immigrant from Russia who made his living as a printer. When he was a young child, Fleishman contracted polio, and needed to use crutches and braces for the rest of his life because of paralysis in his legs and arm. He attended college at the University of Georgia and Brooklyn College, and graduated with a law degree from Columbia University in 1944.

== Career ==
Fleishman moved to Los Angeles in 1946 and almost immediately began his career as a defense lawyer for targets of obscenity laws, basing his defense on freedom of speech. After twenty-five years of mostly successful outcomes in obscenity trials, he began to advocate in the courtroom for people with disabilities, often in class action civil rights lawsuits. He also was an active volunteer for Southwestern Law School’s Institute for the Disabled and the Elderly as well as the Western Law Center for the Handicapped.

== Impact ==
Fleishman participated in and won many First Amendment obscenity cases, defending adult movie theaters, films such as Deep Throat, and well-known books such as Tropic of Cancer by Henry Miller, as well as lesser known works such as Sex Life of a Cop. He also litigated many legal cases as an advocate for people with disabilities, including the right of disabled people to serve on juries and have unfettered access to buses, schools, and hotels.

Fleishman argued many free speech cases before the Supreme Court. David L. Hudson, Jr. states that "His most important First Amendment case was arguably Smith v. California, which established that booksellers could not be held strictly liable for the contents of every book on their shelves."

== Personal life ==
Fleishman was married to his wife, Doris, for more than 50 years, and had three children: Bette, Sue, and Judy. He and his family lived for many years in Beverly Hills.

== Death and legacy ==
Fleishman died of pneumonia on September 23, 1999, at Cedars-Sinai Medical Center in Los Angeles. His papers are preserved at the Charles E. Young Research Library at UCLA as well as a smaller archive at the University Library at California State University, Northridge.

== Awards ==
- Hugh M. Hefner First Amendment Award for Lifetime Achievement Award
- Hal Freeman 'Freedom Isn't Free' Award
- Independent Living Center of Southern California Lifetime Achievement Award

== Publications ==
- "Sexual Unorthodoxy and the Law." Homophile Studies, no. 5, Spring 1959, p. 52+. Archives of Sexuality and Gender.
- "Witchcraft and obscenity: twin superstitions." Wilson Library Bulletin (April 1965).
- Selected obscenity cases. Los Angeles : Blackstone Book Company, 1968.
- "Abolish the Un-American obscenity laws." Section of Individual Rights and Responsibilities Newsletter, Vol. 4, No. 1 (Winter 1977) (American Bar Association).
- "Representing Notorious Clients" (co-authored with Leonard Boudin, Richard Hibey, and Dennis Riorden). Litigation Vol. 18, No. 1 (Fall 1991), pp. 8–13, 54–55. (American Bar Association).
