= American News Company =

U.S. media distribution company (1864–1957)

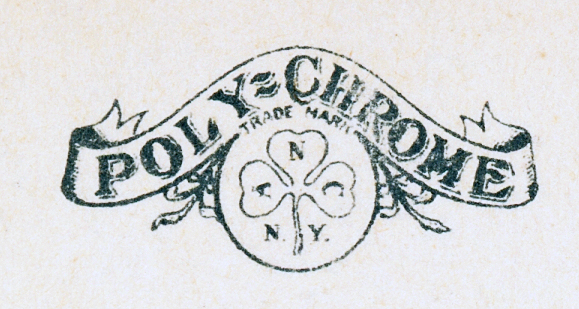
- Type: Distributor, wholesaler
- Industry: Newspapers, books, comics, magazines
- Founded: 1864
- Founder: Sinclair Tousey
- Defunct: 1957
- Headquarters: New Jersey, New York City, USA
- Key people: Henry Garfinkle, Myron Garfinkle
- Divisions: Union News Company

American News Company (ANC) was a magazine, newspaper, book, and comic book distribution company founded in 1864 by Sinclair Tousey, which dominated the U.S. distribution market in the last quarter of the 19th century and the first half of the 20th century. The company's abrupt 1957 demise caused a huge shakeup in the publishing industry, forcing many magazine, comic book, and paperback publishers out of business.

== Early years ==
The American News Company had its roots in two New York City newspaper and periodical wholesaling firms: Sinclair Tousey's company on Nassau St., and the firm Dexter, Hamilton & Co. at 22 Ann St. These were the two largest news and periodical wholesalers in New York City at the time of their merger on Feb. 1, 1864, when American News Company was formed. The seven original partners were Sinclair Tousey, John E. Tousey, Harry Dexter, George Dexter, John Hamilton, Patrick Farrelly, and Solomon W. Johnson. These partners formed the core of the company's management until the death of the last surviving partner, Solomon Johnson, in 1913. Sinclair Tousey was the company's first president, followed after his death by Harry Dexter, who was succeeded by Solomon Johnson.

The company's Boston branch was formed by taking over the wholesale periodical business of Boston bookseller Alexander Williams. In 1854, Williams had bought out the business of Fetridge & Co., which operated a large magazine store known as the Periodical Depot or the Periodical Arcade on the corner of State St. and Washington. Williams worked up an extensive trade as a wholesaler of newspapers and periodicals to out of town dealers all over the East Coast, and by the time ANC was organized the wholesale side of the business had grown too large for Williams to handle alone. Along with two smaller competing firms, Dyer & Co. and Federhen & Co., the Boston trade was reorganized as a subsidiary of American News under the name New England News Company, with Williams as one of the principal shareholders. Initially an officer of the new corporation, Williams was a bookstore proprietor at heart and left soon afterward in 1869 to take over the famous "Old Corner Bookstore".

Two years after the company formed it added to its newspaper and magazine business a book wholesaling department, under the supervision of a Mr. Dunham; this grew to be one of the largest in the country.

With the end of the Civil War, the firm grew rapidly along the expanding railroads as they opened up the West, with the commencement of coast-to-coast continental rail service in 1869. Legislation passed by Congress required the railroads to transport newspapers and periodicals as second class bulk mail at a lower subsidized rate—one cent per pound for any distance between news agencies, so that a bundle of New York newspapers could be sent across the continent to Los Angeles for the same price that it could be shipped across the river to Newark—and ANC exploited the availability of cheap rail transport to expand their distribution network across the continent, so far ahead of the competition that they effectively shut any possible rivals out of the market, establishing their periodical depots by the hundreds in every city and large town on the rail system. At the same time, the number of periodicals being published in America was exploding: Frank Mott, in A History of American Magazines, estimates that the number of titles being published boomed from 700 at the end of the Civil War to 3300 in 1885.

In 1893, an article in The American Newsman summed up the company's success: "It is as the keeper of a thousand secrets involving the fortunes of publishers and authors that the American News Company surrounds its vast and intricate system with an atmosphere of mystery, so that few persons have any idea of its really astounding proportions. It has gradually absorbed the smaller organizations until it now embraces thirty-two powerful news companies, with an annual operating expense of $2,488,000 and an annual business of something like $18,000,000. This organization handles the bulk of the reading matter of the United States and supplies nearly nineteen thousand dealers."

On any given day, a hundred new issues of the thousands of titles ANC handled would typically be fed into the ANC distribution system. In New York City alone (at that time consisting solely of Manhattan and the Bronx) 125 wagons and drivers crisscrossed the city every day making deliveries, with 14 local neighborhood substations.

ANC directly employed 1,154 people in 1893, with a weekly payroll of $16,255; with $1 million in real estate holdings and $1.4 million in merchandise on hand. It gave extensive credit to the firms it did business with and $800,000 was due at any given time in accounts receivable from dealers around the country. It owned 18 buildings outright around the country and rented 39 more, and had $200,000 invested in horses and wagons. The branches of the company at this time were located in Albany, Baltimore, Boston, Brooklyn, Buffalo, Chicago, Cincinnati, Cleveland, Denver, Detroit, Kansas City, Montreal, Newark, New Orleans, Omaha, Philadelphia, Pittsburgh, Providence, San Francisco, Springfield (Mass.), St. Louis, St. Paul, Toronto, Troy, and Washington D.C. These branches were organized as subsidiaries under different names, for example the Chicago branch was the Great Western News Company, founded in 1866. The International News Company, on Duane Street in New York, was the branch handling the company's extensive overseas business. A branch called the Union News Company existed solely to sell newspapers and magazines on the railroads, with 300 newsstands in various railroad stations which by 1893 covered 40% of the entire US railroad system, paying $1000 a day for exclusive rights. Under this system, Union News could keep the Chicago Tribune out of the Chicago area train stations until the Tribune agreed to their terms. In 1958, the FTC found that Union News was operating nearly a thousand newsstands around the country (the next largest operator had 57), putting Union News in a position to dictate terms and demand rebates from publishers.

Typically, in the post-Civil War era, ANC in its position as the middleman between publishers and newsstand dealers would allow the newsstand dealers to keep between 5 and 10 cents on the sale of a 35-cent magazine like the monthly Harper's, and three cents on a 10-cent magazine like Harper's Weekly. Unsold copies of most titles were fully returnable, although some titles were sold to the dealers as non-returnable at a steeper discount, similar to today's "direct sale" comic book market.

American News's monopoly position in the market was virtually unchallenged until Frank Munsey, frustrated by ANC's refusal to handle his cheap 10 cent pulp magazines, was forced to set up his own distribution company, Red Star News. Munsey had balked when ANC informed him that 4 cents was the most they would pay wholesale for a magazine that sold for 10 cents retail, and thus Munsey retaliated by cutting out the middleman. With Red Star News handling the distribution he managed to receive 7 cents per copy instead of the 4 that ANC had promised him. This was the first of the so-called "ID" or "independent distributors". Munsey was followed in time by Hearst, Fawcett, Curtis, Annenberg and Donenfeld, all constrained by various factors into setting up their own independent distribution networks outside the ANC monopoly; nonetheless ANC remained by far the dominant firm up until its collapse.

== Background ==
American News functioned both as a national distributor and as a local periodical wholesaler. After World War II, headed by Henry Garfinkle, the company had over 300 branches blanketing the United States, and employed several thousand employees. During the middle of the century, American News stood as the largest book wholesaler in the world, dominating the industry. It also had a near stranglehold on the distribution of magazines and newspapers within the United States market, dominating that industry as well. Listed on the New York Stock Exchange, it had more than 5400 stockholders. Headquartered in New Jersey, American News also had offices in downtown Manhattan.

Comic book clients of American News included Atlas Comics, Dell Comics, and Toby Press. National Comics had its own distributor, Independent News and was able to take on distribution for other comic book publishers after American News failed. Comic book publishers who were not able to come to terms with National's distributors quickly went under, and others were limited in the number of titles they were allowed to distribute under the new arrangements—Atlas (later known as Marvel Comics) was rationed to eight titles a month. The change also affected paperback book publishers like Lion Library, which went out of business when Independent News (which was already distributing rival New American Library) refused to take it on. Avon paperbacks, which had been founded as a subsidiary of ANC in 1941 in the early days of the paperback boom, managed to survive the crash and was taken over by Hearst.

Many magazines distributed in the 1940s were in pulp format; by the end of 1955, nearly all had either ceased publication or switched to digest format. This change was largely the work of the refusal of American News and other distributors to carry the pulp magazines since they were no longer profitable. The 1950s boom in science fiction magazine publishing, with 30 new titles being launched, turned overnight into collapse with the failure of ANC. Other pulp fiction genres—western, romance, detective—suffered a similar extinction event. These sections of the magazine field were already in decline and it was simply not worth the effort to rescue already marginal magazine titles.

== Demise ==
In 1952, the government began antitrust litigation against ANC which was destined to drag on until the company's demise. Around 1955 major magazine publishers began disengaging themselves from ANC and making other arrangements for newsstand distribution. When Collier's and Woman's Home Companion, two of their biggest-selling titles, folded in January 1957, it came as a serious blow to ANC at a time when the company was already on financially shaky ground. In April Dell Publishing announced that they were pulling out and making other arrangements for their distribution.

The mammoth company's abrupt demise in June 1957 has been a source of speculation for decades. One theory is that a speculator became aware that a bookkeeping peculiarity in American News' accounts could allow a large profit from liquidating the company. He acquired control, and proceeded to sell off the assets, ultimately winding the company up. This theory was summarized in a 1960 lawsuit:

In 1955 the defendant Henry Garfinkle and the members of his family acquired 11 per cent of the stock in the defendant American News Company. Soon thereafter he became its president. ... The defendant American News Company, notwithstanding its great size and notwithstanding its apparent dominance in the periodical distribution field, commencing in the fifties began to encounter difficulties. It lost franchise after franchise and began sustaining heavy losses. By 1957 it had sustained losses in connection with its distribution of periodicals in excess of $8,000,000.00. In 1957 it decided to cease its activities as a national distributor and local wholesaler. It laid off around 8,000 of its employees and sold all of the equipment used in connection with its distribution activities. By June 1957, it was entirely out of business as a national distributor and as a local wholesaler.

An alternative (but somewhat similar explanation) for the company's demise has been offered by comic book historian and author Gerard Jones. The company in 1956...

had been found guilty of restraint of trade and ordered to divest itself of the newsstands it owned. Its biggest client, George T. Delacorte Jr., announced he would seek a new distributor for his Dell comics and paperbacks. The owners of American News estimated the effect that would have on their income. Then they looked at the value of the New Jersey real estate where their headquarters sat. They liquidated the company and sold the land. The company ... vanished without a trace in the suburban growth of the 1950s.

== Repercussions ==
The effect on the American magazine market was catastrophic. Many magazines had to switch to one of the independent distributors, who were able to set their own conditions for taking on new business. This often forced the magazines to change from a digest size to a larger format, and to become monthly rather than bimonthly or quarterly. Many magazines could not afford to make these changes, both of which required either high circulation or a strong advertising base, and many magazines folded as a result.

An example of a company that the change in distributor had a drastic impact on is Atlas Comics, which was forced to switch distribution to Independent News, owned by National Comics Publications, owner of Atlas' rival, DC Comics. Because of this, Atlas was constrained as to its publishing output for the next decade (including the early years of its successor, Marvel Comics).
