= List of fictional anarchists =

This is a list of fictional anarchists, including the source material in which they are found, their creators, the individuals who interpreted them as anarchists during development (if not originally created as such), and short descriptions of each.

An anarchist is a person who rejects any form of compulsory government (cf. "state") and supports its elimination. Anarchism is a political philosophy encompassing theories and attitudes which reject compulsory government (the state) and support its elimination, often due to a wider rejection of involuntary or permanent authority. Anarchism is defined by The Concise Oxford Dictionary of Politics as "the view that society can and should be organized without a coercive state."

However, fictional anarchists are subject to the personal interpretations and opinions of Anarchism held by the creator, and as such may imbue negative anarchist stereotypes. Further, characters may be interpreted as anarchists by second parties involved in their development. The inclusion of these characters may be controversial, but is necessary for purposes of objectivity. This provides a means by which social attitudes regarding anarchism and anarchists may be studied and compared to those of other eras and cultures.

Characters who are popularly considered "anarchic", but who are not specifically identified as anarchists by their source material, are excluded.

== Comics/sequential art ==
Anarchik
A parody of the "bomb wielding, bearded anarchist" stereotype. He appeared in Rivista Anarchica, by Roberto Ambrosoli, c. 1970, and is often reprinted in contemporary anarchist pamphlets.

Anarky
A comic book character appearing in various DC Comics publications as an antagonist of Batman. He was created and co-developed by Alan Grant and Norm Breyfogle in 1989.

Boy
A martial artist, former New York City Police Department officer, and member of an anarchist secret society in The Invisibles (1994) by Grant Morrison.

Evey Hammond
A protégé of V, an anarchist terrorist in V for Vendetta, by Alan Moore and David Lloyd in 1982. Evey eventually adopts V's role.

Green Arrow
A superhero known for his liberal progressive characterization. Appearing in Green Arrow and various other comic books published by DC Comics, he was created by Mort Weisinger and George Papp in 1941. He was revamped in 1969 by Dennis O'Neil, who characterized him as a political progressive and dubbed him an "anarchist".

Jack Frost
A young hooligan, possibly a future Buddha, and member of an anarchic secret society in The Invisibles (1994) by Grant Morrison.

Hobie Brown/Spiderpunk (comics)

King Mob
A magician, assassin, terrorist, and member of an anarchist secret society in The Invisibles (1994) by Grant Morrison.

Lord Fanny
A transgender Brazilian shaman, and member of an anarchist secret society in The Invisibles (1994) by Grant Morrison.:

Mira Anarchy

An anarchist thinker, and changes worldview of a pro-capitalism protagonist Jullian in Her Name is Anarchy by Mason Carter.

Pillock
An intellectual pelican, in Donald Rooum's Wildcat (1985). Pillock is often used to present complex social ideas and anarchist philosophy.

Ragged Robin
A time traveling, cybernetically enhanced telepath, and member of an anarchist secret society in The Invisibles (1994) by Grant Morrison.

Tank Girl
A violent punk, wanted criminal, and tank commander. She was created in 1988 by Jamie Hewlett & Alan Martin for their independent comic series, Tank Girl.

V
An anonymous, English terrorist with enhanced strength, reflexes, and mental capacity. He is perhaps a genius or merely insane, and acts as an allegorical force for anarchy. He was created by Alan Moore and David Lloyd for their 1982 comic series, V for Vendetta.

Wild Cat
An anarcho-punk cat created by Donald Rooum in 1985 as the lead character in his comic strip, Wildcat.

== Literature ==
Hugh Crane, aka Cagliostro the Great
An anarchist stage magician and Discordian counterculture figure in Schrodinger’s Cat Trilogy and Natural Law, or Don’t Put a Rubber on Your Willy (and Other Writings from a Natural Outlaw) both by Robert Anton Wilson.

Captain Raymond
A secondary character, and anarchistic leader of a band of thieves in Things as They Are; or, The Adventures of Caleb Williams, by William Godwin.

Clay
A main character encountered by the protagonists of The Oregon Experiment, by Keith Scribner. The character was based on anarchists the author met.

Professor Bernardo de la Paz
An intellectual subversive, who self-identifies as a "Rational Anarchist", in The Moon Is a Harsh Mistress (1966), by Robert A. Heinlein

Edward Tolby
An agent of the Anarchist League, in The Last of the Masters (1954), by Philip K. Dick. Edward Tolby is among a trio of anarchists tasked with investigating rumors of a government in hiding near a remote mountain valley. His daughter and comrade, Silvia Tolby, is kidnapped by a military scouts. After infiltrating the state, Edward assassinates the head of state, the last "government robot", and rescues his daughter.

Corky Laputa
An avowed anarchist who sows chaos in various ways in The Face by Dean Koontz.

Freddie "Stubby" Lynch
A poor paperboy, in The Anarchist: His Dog (1912), by Susan Glaspell.

Valentin Michael Karstev
A Russian revolutionary, terrorist, and author of an anarchist treatise, The Laws of Human History, in Protect and Defend (1999), by Eric L. Harry.

Hagbard Celine
A discordian genius, computer engineer, and captain of a submarine, in The Illuminatus! Trilogy (1969), by Robert Shea and Robert Anton Wilson.

Kaw-Djer
A mysterious man who believes in anarchic individualism, in The Survivors of the 'Jonathan' (1897), by Jules Verne. Possibly based on Peter Kropotkin.

Leo Gold
A pessimistic, aging author and former labor organizer, in At the Anarchists' Convention (1979), by John Sayles.

Lucian Gregory
A militant terrorist who promotes chaos as the epitome of beauty and anarchy, in The Man Who Was Thursday (1908), by G. K. Chesterton. He is an allegorical figure, representing Lucifer.

Mafile
A murderous terrorist, in An Anarchist (1905), by Joseph Conrad.

Marguerite Allard
A French-Canadian anarchist in Foxhunt (2022) by Luke Francis Beirne. Foxhunt follows a group of ex-pat writers in London in the early years of the Cold War. Allard, a central character, explicitly identifies as an anarchist. She writes for and edits a London-based magazine after leaving Montreal, where she operated a radical print-shop.

The Mechanic (a.k.a. Crocodile & Anarchisto de Barcelona)
An anonymous escaped convict, driven mad by his association with anarchists, and who never reveals his true name, in An Anarchist (1905), by Joseph Conrad. He denies being an anarchist, but is still labeled one by the narrator at the end of the story.

Paula Mendoza
An anarchist who uses unconventional methods as a diplomat to maintain peace between antagonistic political factions, in Floating Worlds 1975, by Cecelia Holland.

Merlyn (as portrayed by the author)
The Arthurian wizard, portrayed as an anarchist, anti-communist, anti-fascist, and antimilitarist, in The Book of Merlyn 1941, by T. H. White.

Michaelis
An underground terrorist, in The Secret Agent (1907), by Joseph Conrad.

Ossipon
An underground terrorist, in The Secret Agent (1907), by Joseph Conrad.

Robert Penn
An agent of the Anarchist League, in The Last of the Masters (1954), by Philip K. Dick. Robert Penn is among a trio of anarchists tasked with investigating rumors of a government in hiding near a remote mountain valley. En route his group is intercepted by spies of the state, who are ordered to kill the agents. Of the three, Penn does not survive, though the spies die with him.

Shevek
An experimental physicist and theoretician, attempting to develop a General Temporal Theory, in The Dispossessed (1974), by Ursula K. Le Guin.

Simon
A murderous terrorist, in An Anarchist (1905), by Joseph Conrad.

Silvia Tolby
An agent of the Anarchist League, in The Last of the Masters (1954), by Philip K. Dick. Silvia Tolby is among a trio of anarchists tasked with investigating rumors of a government in hiding near a remote mountain valley. She is kidnapped by military scouts after falling unconscious in a car wreck. She is taken to the government center and questioned by the head of state, the last "government robot". Her father, Edward Tolby, assassinates the robot and rescues her.

== Television/film ==
Alex Taylor
A zealously devoted anarchist and revolutionary in Captain Laserhawk: A Blood Dragon Remix who aims to destroy the Eden regime no matter the cost.
Cassian Andor
A rebel thief, soldier, pilot and assassin in Rogue One: A Star Wars Story (2016) and Star Wars: Andor. He is an insurrectionary anarchist.:
Cosmo
A former 1960s radical and hacker, performed by Ben Kingsley in Sneakers (1992). Cosmo, who finances his anarchist activities with a day job as a money launderer for organized crime, schemes to steal an experimental "universal decryptor", which will allow him to hack into and destroy all computerized financial records, effectively toppling the capitalist system and (he hopes) laying the groundwork for a horizontalist society.

Dennis
A peasant member of an anarcho-syndicalist commune, performed by Michael Palin in Monty Python and the Holy Grail (1975).

Dol-Suk
A knife fighter and assassin, and member of an underground terrorist cell, in Anarchists (Anakiseuteu) (2000). The role of Dol-Suk is played by Lee Bum-Soo.

Double D
A slacker and squatter. He is played by Steve Van Wormer in The Anarchist Cookbook (2002).

Esoqq
A violently independent and anti-social alien. Star Trek: The Next Generation, episode 66, "Allegiance" (1990). Reiner Schöne performed the role.

Floren
An anarcha-feminist, Mujeres Libres member, spirit medium, and militia soldier during the Spanish Civil War, in Libertarian Women (Libertarias) (1996). The role of Floren is performed by Ana Belén.

Gin
A hippie squatter. She is played by Sabine Singh in The Anarchist Cookbook (2002).

Johnny Red
A 1960s radical who idealizes Sweden. He is played by John Savage in The Anarchist Cookbook (2002).

Han Myung-Gon
A disguise artist and leader of an underground terrorist cell, in Anarchists (Anakiseuteu) (2000). Han Myung-Gon is played by Kim Sang-Joong.

Karla
A bisexual squatter with issues of misandry, in The Anarchist Cookbook (2002). She is played by Gina Philips.

Kim
An exiled hero of the Spanish Civil War. He is played by Antonio Resines in The Shanghai Spell (El Embrujo de Shanghai) (2002).

Lee Geun
A martial artist, and member of an underground terrorist cell, in Anarchists. Lee Geun is portrayed by Jeong Jun-ho. (Anakiseuteu) (2000).

Lily Cruz/Ivy Aguas
A strong woman vowing revenge against the corrupt and terroristic/fascistic Ardiente political clan responsible for her family's loss, in Wildflower She is portrayed by Maja Salvador In this 2017-2018 Philippine political action-crime-suspense epic.

Nandu Forcat
A former soldier in the Spanish Civil War. He is played by Eduard Fernández, in The Shanghai Spell (El Embrujo de Shanghai) (2002).

Pedro
An inmate in a World War II era German prison camp, captured while trying to assassinate fascists. He is played by Fernando Rey in Seven Beauties (Pasqualino Settebellezze) (1975).

Pilar
An anarcha-feminist, Mujeres Libres member, and militia leader during the Spanish Civil War, in Libertarian Women (Libertarias) (1996). The role of Pilar is performed by Ana Belén.

Puck
A college dropout, slacker, and squatter, in The Anarchist Cookbook (2002). He is played by Devon Gummersall.

Rick Pratt
A college student, activist, and self-proclaimed "people's poet" in the 1982 BBC television series, The Young Ones, created and performed by Rik Mayall. Rick is a hypocritical, tantrum-throwing attention-seeker, and fan of Cliff Richard. It is implied in the final episode that contrary to his proletarian pretensions, he is from an upper class, Conservative background. He and his co-stars die in the final episode of the series when, having robbed a bank, the bus they are escaping in falls over a cliff and explodes. Mayall created "Rick" as one of several characters he portrayed during his solo act at The Comedy Store, during the early 1980s. Mayall co-created The Young Ones with then girlfriend Lise Mayer during the same period. Injecting the character into the series, it was pitched to the BBC and subsequently picked up for production.

Sweeney
A promiscuous squatter, and DJ who works at a record store in The Anarchist Cookbook (2002). Sweeney (Johnny Whitworth) is one of the squatters who falls under the control of the nihilist, Johnny Black, through an addiction to cocaine.

Sang-Gu
A member-in-training of an underground terrorist cell in Anarchists (Anakiseuteu) (2000). Sang-Gu (Kim In-Kwon) is adopted into the terror cell after they rescue him from a public execution. Orphaned after his family was killed during a village massacre, he traveled to Shanghai to take part in revenge killings against Japanese politicians. He becomes an apprentice to each of the senior cell members, but gravitates to Seregay, and is the only witness to Seregay's death. As the only surviving member of the cell, the narration of the film is told from his perspective decades later.

Seregay
An expert marksman and assassin, and member of an underground terrorist cell in the Korean film, Anarchists (Anakiseuteu) (2000). Seregay (Jang Dong-gun), is an old comrade of Lee Geun, and a victim of torture at the hands of Japanese interrogators, leading to a self-destructive opium addiction. After failing a mission, he is ordered by his leftist leaders to redeem himself by taking part in an impossible assassination mission. Surprisingly, he succeeds, but is betrayed by another assassin sent to be sure he is killed.

Tina Santiago
A young mother and widow of an Iraq War veteran, turned militant Black bloc protester in This Revolution (2004). Actress Rosario Dawson was arrested during filming for breaking an anti-mask ordinance at the Republican National Convention protest march. The script of the film was quickly rewritten to account for her absence, and live footage of the arrest was included in the movie, portrayed instead as the arrest of the character, Santiago.

Jerome Valeska
An anarchist, terrorist, and criminal gang lord, created by producer and screenwriter Bruno Heller for the television series Gotham, and played by actor Cameron Monaghan. The character acts as a tribute and forerunner to the Batman supervillain Joker, as well as exploring the mythology of the character.

Yorgi
An anarchist, terrorist, and criminal gang lord, in the film xXx (2002). Yogi (Marton Csokas) was an officer in the Russian army during the Second Chechen War, until he and his subordinates grew disgusted by the corruption of the government and the deaths of their own comrades. They mutinied, and reorganized as a criminal organization, Anarchy 99, named for the year their rebellion. In an effort to eliminate government on a global scale, he builds an automated submarine, Ahab, that will anonymously launch deadly gas at several cities worldwide, in the hope that the resulting social turmoil will initiate a breakdown in global order, leaving only a condition of "anarchy". He is killed by Xander Cage, who then successfully neutralizes the poison aboard the Ahab.

Pa'u Zotoh Zhaan
A Delvian priestess and political prisoner in the Sci-Fi Channel original series, Farscape (1999). She is of an empathic and telepathic alien species, and has skills in drug and explosive manufacture.
She dies early in season three of the series, sacrificing herself to save the lives of her shipmates. In reality, actress Virginia Hey was unable to continue playing the character, as the makeup effects were harming her kidneys.

Zaheer
Antagonist of the third season of Nickelodeon TV series The Legend of Korra. Zaheer is a self-described Anarchist and leader of the terrorist organization Order of the Red Lotus. Zaheer's goal throughout the series is to create a worldwide society based on the principles of freedom and chaos by overthrowing all world governments and killing the Avatar. Though born a non-bender, Zaheer gains the ability of airbending after Harmonic Convergence, which he becomes greatly adept gaining the ability of flight, a technique that no other airbender in the show has been shown to have.

Swift Wind
A recurring character in the Netflix animated series She-Ra and the Princesses of Power (2018). Swift Wind, a Pegasus, gained the ability to speak and think alongside various magical abilities following his transformation from a horse. Soon afterwards, he decided to dedicate himself to the cause of freeing horses from stables across Etheria. While never overtly referred to as an anarchist, Swift Wind does express a desire to "dismantle unjust hierarchies", and subscribes to a belief which he summarizes under the slogan "freedom, equality, and hay for all".

== Theatre ==
Tom Collins
A philosophy professor with AIDS, Tom Collins is a major character in the American Tony Award- and Pulitzer Prize-winning rock musical, Rent (1996), by Jonathan Larson. He is the friend and former roommate of several characters, including Roger, Mark, Benny, and Maureen, and is Angel's lover. During musical numbers, the performer playing Tom sings bass. The character is inspired by "Colline", a character in La bohème, by Giacomo Puccini.

== Opera ==
Mario Cavaradossi
Tosca's husband. Cavaradossi was a fugitive and he died by Scarpia's order, who was the chief of police.

== See also ==
- Anarchism and the arts
- Libertarian science fiction
