= The Last of the Masters =

Short story by Philip K. Dick

- Short story by Philip K. Dick
- Country: United States
- Language: English
- Genres: Science fiction (post-apocalyptic/ social science); political fiction

Publication
- Published in: Orbit Science Fiction No.5
- Publication type: Periodical
- Publisher: Hanro Corporation
- Media type: Pulp magazine
- Publication date: November/December 1954

"The Last of the Masters" (also known as "Protection Agency") is a science fiction novelette by American writer Philip K. Dick. The original manuscript of the story was received by the Scott Meredith Literary Agency on July 15, 1953, and the story was published by the Hanro Corporation in the final issue of Orbit Science Fiction in 1954. It has since been reprinted in several Philip K. Dick story collections, beginning with The Golden Man in 1980.

"The Last of the Masters" depicts a society 200 years after a global anarchist revolution has toppled the national governments of the world (the exact year is unstated). Civilization has stagnated due to the loss of scientific knowledge and industry during the legendary revolt. Elsewhere, the last state, governing a highly centralized and efficient society, conceals itself from the Anarchist League, a global militia preventing the recreation of any government. When three agents of the League are sent to investigate rumors of the microstate's existence, the government arranges for them to be killed, leading to the death of one and the capture of another. Tensions rapidly escalate after the agents of the state realize that the third has escaped. Assuming he will report the state's existence, the government mobilizes for total war. In actuality, the surviving anarchist elects to attempt his comrades' rescue and assassinate the head of state: the last surviving "government robot".

The primary theme of the story is the conflict between anarchism and statism, the political and ethical dimensions of which are explored through the characters' dialogue. Though the attention the story received was limited prior to the author's death in 1982, it has since seen greater circulation in Philip K. Dick story collections, and has been reviewed and analyzed for its postmodern critique of technology and its political implications.

== Plot summary ==
=== The last government ===
Here, within the ring of hills, Bors had constructed an accurate and detailed reproduction of a society two centuries gone. The world as it had been in the old days. The time of governments. The time that had been pulled down by the Anarchist League.

— Philip K. Dick,
"The Last of the Masters"

The title character, Bors, a 200-year-old "government integration robot"—and the last in existence—awakens after a routine maintenance check to learn that his motor system is in a state of decline. An artificially intelligent machine who displays a degree of emotion and even psychological complexity, he is informed by Fowler, a personal mechanic, that his body has begun to break down due to age. His legs no longer work, his motor system will be irreparable in a matter of months, and full paralysis will take place in under a year.

Of his entire body, only five "synapse coils" have not yet begun to degrade. These memory units are irreplaceable due to the lack of skilled technicians and rare components needed to recreate them. Within them, he stores the last records of advanced science and technology, which he uses to guide his society at high efficiency as a benevolent dictator, operating according to utilitarian principles. Though he wields hegemonic control over his society, he views his dictatorship as the last bastion of humanity's scientific progress, and views himself as a guardian who oversees and protects that progress. This causes him to privately despair that he—and the knowledge only he possesses—will soon die. He also becomes increasingly paranoid, fearing to trust a loyal assistant, Peter Green, and confiding only in Fowler, his personal mechanic.

Hidden in a remote mountain valley, Bors commands the world's last government. The microstate is tightly centralized around him, and he manages it bureaucratically for optimum efficiency in all sectors of the economy and military. The effect is "an accurate and detailed reproduction of a society two centuries gone." Bors is immediately established as an utterly necessary figure in his society and is quickly escorted back into service as the leader of the government by Fowler. A personal assistant as well as mechanic to Bors, Fowler maintains a pretension of loyalty to the robot, but privately recognizes that his society is stagnant and that its leader is becoming mentally unbalanced. Pessimistic, he expresses cynicism regarding the subservient role humans in his society play to Bors. He is contrasted with Peter Green, a genuinely loyal assistant to the robot, who is among the few humans trusted to oversee his body while it is unconscious for repair. Though loyal to his leader, Green nonetheless draws Bors' distrust as the robot's paranoia steadily grows.

=== The Anarchist League ===
Elsewhere, three members of the "Anarchist League" are on a mission to investigate rumors of a government in existence near a remote mountain valley. The League is a global organization dedicated to seeking out and eradicating governments. Established at some unknown point during or after the global revolt, the League is organized around "League camps" which dot the landscape. Members of the League are easily recognized by their "ironite staffs": metallic walking sticks which they are trained in using as weapons. These tools are a symbol of the League—"the walking Anarchists who patrolled the world on foot, the world's protection agency."

"You have to know," Tolby said, "how the League was formed. You have to know how we pulled down the governments that day. Pulled them down and destroyed them. Burned all the buildings. And all the records. Billions of microfilms and papers. Great bonfires that burned for weeks."

— Philip K. Dick,
"The Last of the Masters"

The three member team is composed of Edward Tolby, his daughter, Silvia Tolby (of unspecified age, but vaguely described as an adolescent or young adult), and their mutual friend, Robert Penn. While en route to the valley, the team arrives in a small rural town by the name of Fairfax. Fairfax is littered with ancient, decaying gadgets; the last remnants of the era of governments and high tech society, which none of the locals know how to fix or reproduce. Excited by the strangers, the locals ask about the League. Tolby answers their questions in turn, ending with an explanation of the timeline of events which led up to the great revolt. The event is summarized as having begun with revolts in Europe which overthrow the national governments. After France exists for a month free of government, millions join the by then explicitly anarchist movement to disarm the nuclear powers. At each toppled government center, millions of records are burned and government integration robots are destroyed. These events result in the setting of the story; a world full of anachronistic high-technology, interspersed in a pre-industrialized, agrarian culture.

=== Conflict and resolution ===
While retelling the story of the anarchist revolution, Tolby attracts the attention of a local who invites the trio of anarchists to her home, but who is in secret a government spy ordered to kill them. The ensuing assassination plot is bungled, as the spy dies in the process, but succeeds in killing Penn. Silvia is also badly injured and left unconscious. Her father survives the tragedy largely unscathed, however, and awakens as a patrol of military scouts arrives. The scouts panic after a brief counterattack by Tolby and retreat with Silvia captive. After re-arming himself, Tolby sets out to mount her rescue.

"My God," she said softly. "You have no understanding of us. You run all this, and you're incapable of empathy. You're nothing but a mechanical computer."

— Philip K. Dick,
"The Last of the Masters"

Bors is alerted to the situation and overreacts upon learning that one of the three anarchists has escaped. Fearing that the agent will alert the world to their existence, he initiates plans for a war economy and decides to question Silvia in her hospital room. Their dialogue reveals the story of his escape during the collapse of governments and the establishment of the microstate. He was damaged and in transport for repairs when the anarchist revolution began 200 years prior, allowing him to survive in hiding. Enraged by his calm indifference to the prospect of war, Silvia attacks him and attempts her escape, but is restrained by guards.

Tolby infiltrates the mountain valley, sneaking past the rapidly mobilizing army of the state. After killing and outmaneuvering inexperienced soldiers, he arrives at the government center and encounters Fowler. Fowler alludes to his desire to end the government and spurs Tolby onward. Ultimately, Tolby confronts and kills Bors, sending the building into confusion as the citizens react with hysteria and grief. The condition is implied to spread outward from the city to troops in the hills, resulting in mass desertion. No longer resisted by guards, Tolby reunites with Silvia. The story concludes as Fowler secretly salvages three remaining synapse coils from Bors' remains, "just in case the times change".

== Publication history ==
Written early in Philip K. Dick's career, "The Last of the Masters" was advertised on the front cover for the final issue of Orbit Science Fiction in 1954.

The exact date Philip K. Dick wrote "The Last of the Masters" is unknown, but the original manuscript of the novelette was received by the Scott Meredith Literary Agency on July 15, 1953. 25 years old at the time, Dick was in the habit of submitting a new story to the agency weekly. Just prior to receiving "Last of the Masters", the agency received "The Turning Wheel" on July 8, and following the former, the agency received "The Father-thing" on July 21. "The Last of the Masters" was published over a year later, in the 1954 November/December issue of Orbit Science Fiction no.5. The issue was the last in a science fiction anthology series edited by Donald A. Wollheim. Orbit Science Fiction advertised "The Last of the Masters" on its cover and included Dick among an advertised list of prominent contributing authors, among them August Derleth, Gordon R. Dickson, and Chad Oliver. The novelette was republished in 1958 for the Australian market by Jubilee Publications Pty., in Space Station 42 and Other Stories, a part of the Satellite Series.

The novelette was not published again until the 1980 release of The Golden Man, the sixth collection of classic stories by Dick. This collection also included the only commentary Dick ever wrote regarding the story. Thereafter, "The Last of the Masters" was included in six more print collections—most of which have seen multiple print runs—and two audiobooks.

== Reception ==
While "The Last of the Masters" was little noticed in the years immediately following its publication, it was reviewed after its 1980 publication in The Golden Man collection. Fellow science fiction writer Thomas M. Disch reviewed Dick's The Golden Man collection among other works in "Fluff and Fizzles", an essay dated to 1979, but published in a 1980 edition of The Magazine of Fantasy and Science Fiction. While celebrating several stories in the collection, and proclaiming to readers the "categorical imperative" of buying a copy, he nonetheless derided most of its contents as "turkeys", citing specifically "The Last of the Masters" as an example. Referring to the story as "a hyperkinetic foray into hairy-chested-style hugger-mugger", Disch also mocked its "action-packed denouement" involving Edward Tolby as an example of "bogus machismo".

In her 1982 review of the Golden Man collection, Hazel Pierce lauded the sophistication of the story, summarizing the theme of "The Last of the Masters" as an examination of "the paradoxical cast of human existence."

== Thematic analysis ==
=== Technological critique ===
In his 1980 commentary on the story, Dick also suggested that his reasoning for making Bors sympathetic was a result of a form of trust he advanced towards robots, as opposed to androids. "Perhaps", he suggested, "it's because a robot does not try to deceive you as to what it is". One of the themes that runs throughout all of Dick's fiction is the "power of empathy" and he uses it as the "key element defining the authentic human being". For example, when Silvia meets the robot that runs the government, she exclaims "My God, you have no understanding of us. You run all this, and you're incapable of empathy. You're nothing but a mechanical computer."

In these stories the real enemy is hypertrophied technology and the attitudes that give it power. The earth's natural resources have been destroyed or depleted, while technology not merely survives this process, but waxes more dominant.

— Christopher Palmer,
Philip K. Dick: Exhilaration and Terror of the Postmodern.

Christopher Palmer, of La Trobe University, has written on the postmodern literary themes of Dick's early short stories, analyzing stories in which "breakdown and ignorance" are the result of social upheaval. Palmer proposed that Dick often created post-apocalyptic scenarios of ruined worlds which held high tech gadgets in an attempt to present a view of postmodern materialism. Common to many of Dick's short stories were settings in which the outgrowth of modernity is a world where that which is natural is in ruin, and what is artificial is reshaped through science into a fantastically high tech form. Palmer presented "The Last of the Masters" as an example of this, as well as "The Variable Man" and The Penultimate Truth, two other post-apocalyptic works by Dick. Palmer contended that these shared themes were "...not simply the expression of dystopian malaise, or of Luddism treacherously taking up residence in popular SF... It points to a coherent interpretation of industrialism and post-industrialism."

Suggesting that many of the philosophical and political underpinnings of the author's short stories stemmed from his views on domestic life, Palmer's focus turned to Dick's common use of sterility as a metaphor. In "The Gun", "Second Variety", The Penultimate Truth, and "The Last of the Masters", people and sometimes the earth itself have been driven to sterility. As Palmer noted of "The Last of the Masters", Bors can be interpreted as a symbol of infertility: "It is not clear why he does not replicate himself, or educate his human servants: it is simply a given that he is sterile. The old, technologically advanced, highly organized civilization is a civilization of production, but now under Bors it can do no more than maintain itself." Following an inspection of other short stories with similar references to sterility, Palmer asserts that Dick's work presented a social and existential protest. Palmer interpreted Dick's social critique to be that if the act of creation validates existence, and genuinely expresses a form of individuality, then the process of reproduction is alienating, oppressive, and retards an individual's liberty. As Palmer explains, "...this process disempowers consumers, and even technocrats, by making them dependent on a process of which they have become entirely ignorant." Existentially, Palmer interpreted Dick to further mean that reproduction violated the author's concept of what made an object unique and valuable: "A thing can't be a real thing unless it is in some sense an individual thing."

Dick's attitude to highly-developed clever machinery is... far more complex than blanket suspicion or hostility.

— Bright Stableford,
Little Victories: Philip K. Dick.

In writing a biography on the author, Brian Stableford placed several of Dick's short stories in a context that established their relationship to the author's personal hardships. "...it always seemed to him [Philip K. Dick] that his career was a catalogue of undeserved disappointments and the record of his published work a travesty of his true ambitions." The personal problems which Dick struggled throughout his life provided fuel for several of the anxiety driven themes for his short stories. In Dick's early work, Stableford highlighted recurring themes in those most popular. These included paranoid suspicions; the dangerous hostility of "seemingly innocent entities"; and "the mechanization of the environment and the computerization of political decision-making". Stories in which androids and robots are a danger to the protagonist include "Autofac", "Colony", and Vulcan's Hammer. However, "The Last of the Masters", Stableford contends, was an exception to Dick's common dystopic portrayals of technology, given Stableford's interpretation of Bors as an altruist, who was "benign" in its role.

=== Political interpretations ===
In his 1980 commentary, Philip K. Dick pointed out the moral ambiguity of the story, laying out its political implications: "Should we have a leader or should we think for ourselves? Obviously the latter, in principle. But – sometimes there lies a gulf between what is theoretically right and that which is practical." This quote became part of a larger political analysis of Dick's work in How Much Does Chaos Scare You? by Aaron Barlow, Associate Professor of English at New York City College of Technology. In analyzing Dick's short fiction, Barlow presented their themes against the backdrop of post-September 11, 2001 America. In particular, Barlow compared many of the philosophical underpinnings of Neoconservatism, and its rise to prominence during the George W. Bush administration, to the philosophy of Philip K. Dick. "To [Dick]," writes Barlow, "the elites were both alien and dangerous. To him, the focus of vision and of political debate should never be on the rulers, but on the little person, the shopkeeper, the mechanic." In his dissection of Dick's work, Barlow compared several stories in which normal humans lose some form of liberty in their society to an elite group. Examples presented include "Autofac", "Null-O", and "Some Kinds of Life". From these stories, Barlow drew three themes important to Dick's anti-government writings: first, that humanity is often doomed by institutions of power created by the humans themselves; second, that paranoia is a natural aspect of governance, as "[n]o elite can ever completely trust the people it governs," and this distrust leaves a governed people in perpetual danger; and third, that the belief that individuality must be sacrificed—either for the sake of social stability or survival—is a constant threat. "To Dick," Barlow adds, "there are few attitudes more dangerous than this." Each of these themes would be revisited in "The Last of the Masters".

Nobody should set out to do things for the masses; the masses, after all, are more than capable of doing for themselves.

— Aaron Barlow,
How Much Does Chaos Scare You?.

Continuing his analysis, Barlow addressed "The Last of the Masters", contrasting it with an earlier work by Dick, "The Defenders". In "The Defenders", humanity has been duped by a noble lie—provided by their robot soldiers—into believing in a war which is not actually taking place. In the latter story, Barlow asserts that Dick surprisingly agreed with such neoconservative theorists as Leo Strauss in the efficacy of the deception. "Here, the [robots] have saved mankind... The 'noble lie' has served its purpose." However, Barlow concedes, "[b]ut this is an extremely early story and Dick had not yet clarified his own world view..." Comparing this story to "The Last of the Masters", Barlow took note of Dick's commentary from The Golden Man collection ("...sometimes there lies a gulf between what is theoretically right and that which is practical.") and concluded that the story represented Dick's understanding of "the problems at the other extreme..." in politics. Where most of Dick's stories presented government in skeptical terms to warn the reader of potential abuse, "The Last of the Master" presented an argument for the utility of government.

Barlow dissected the Anarchist League and "the contradictory nature of their organization" which patrolled a "poor and dirty" world, and juxtaposed this with the "opulent organization of the (state)". In particular, he highlighted dialogue by the robot master, Bors, as illustrating the importance of his leadership to the success of the micro-state. In the story, a conversation with a mechanic leads the robot to state, "You know I'm the only one who can keep all this together. I'm the only one who knows how to maintain a planned society, not a disorderly chaos! If it weren't for me, all this would collapse, and you'd have dust and ruins and weeds. The whole outside would come rushing in to take over!" Barlow concluded that while the story ended in triumph for the anarchists, the story did not go so far as to validate their society. "Dick does not vindicate them," writes Barlow, "keeping it clear that the robot had certainly accomplished something in that valley, though it had eventually gone too far."

=== Spiritual allegory ===
In a commentary made for the 1980 anthology, The Golden Man, Philip K. Dick briefly touched on several themes of the story, including the Christian allegory of the "suffering servant", manifested in the character of Bors. This was touched upon in the Dick biography Divine Invasions, by memoirist and biographer Lawrence Sutin. Drawing on Dick's commentary, Sutin sees Bors as part of a religious pattern in Dick's stories as a "Christ-like robot", and likens the robot to characters in other stories by Dick who suffer from illness.

== See also ==
- 1954 in literature
- Anarchism and the arts
- Assassinations in fiction
- List of apocalyptic and post-apocalyptic fiction
- List of fictional anarchists
- List of social science fiction writers and stories

== Sources ==
- Levack, Daniel (1981). PKD: A Philip K. Dick Bibliography. Underwood-Miller. ISBN 0-934438-33-1.
- Barlow, Aaron (2005). How Much Does Chaos Scare You?: Politics, Religion, and Philosophy in the Fiction of Philip K. Dick. Morrisville, NC. United States: Lulu. ISBN 1-4116-3349-0.
- Dick, Philip K. (1980). Hurst, Mark (ed.). The Golden Man. New York, NY. United States: Berkley Books. ISBN 0-425-04288-X.
- Disch, Thomas M. (2005). On SF. Ann Arbor, MI. United States: University of Michigan Press. ISBN 0-472-06896-2.
- Palmer, Christopher (2003). Philip K. Dick: Exhilaration and Terror of the Postmodern. Liverpool, Merseyside UK: Liverpool University Press. ISBN 0-85323-618-6.
- Pierce, Hazel (September 1982). Philip K. Dick. Starmont Reader's Guide no.12. Mercer Island, Washington: Starmont House. ISBN 0-916732-34-7. OCLC 8494810.
- Rickman, Gregg (1989). To The High Castle: Philip K. Dick, A Life 1928–1962. Long Beach, CA. United States: Fragments West /The Valentine Press. ISBN 0-916063-24-0.
- Stableford, Brian (April 30, 2008). Outside the Human Aquarium. MD, United States: Wildside Press. ISBN 978-0-89370-457-5.
- Sutin, Lawrence (2005). Divine Invasions: A Life of Philip K. Dick. Carroll & Graf Publishers. ISBN 0-7867-1623-1.
- Warrick, Patricia S. (1987). Mind in Motion: The Fiction of Philip K. Dick. Carbondale: Southern Illinois University Press. ISBN 0-8093-1326-X.
- Wollheim, Donald A., ed. (November–December 1954). Orbit Science Fiction vol.1 no.5. New York, NY. United States: Hanro Corporation.
