= Nullo =

Nullo may refer to:

- "Null-O," a 1958 science fiction short story by Philip K. Dick
- Genital nullification, a surgical procedure that entirely removes the genitals
- Francesco Nullo (1826–1863), Italian patriot, military officer, and merchant
- Italian destroyer Francesco Nullo, two Italian naval ships
