= Audio commentary =

Additional audio track that plays in real time with a video

An audio commentary by Michael Huang for an episode of Battle for B.F.D.I.

An audio commentary is an additional audio track, usually digital, consisting of a lecture or comments by one or more speakers, that plays in tandem with a video. Commentaries are most often spoken by the production team. They can be serious or entertaining in nature, and can add information which otherwise would not be disclosed to audience members.

== History ==
The Criterion Collection introduced audio commentary on the LaserDisc format, which was able to accommodate multiple audio tracks. The first commentary track, for the 1984 LaserDisc release of the 1933 film King Kong, was recorded by Ronald Haver, a curator at the Los Angeles County Museum of Art, and was inspired by the stories Haver told while supervising the film-to-video transfer process. Criterion expected that the commentary would only be of interest to serious film students. It received a favorable reaction, and his commentary on King Kong is considered to ultimately have started the trend. Haver went on to provide commentaries for Criterion for the rest of his life.

Excerpt of Haver's commentary for King Kong:

Hello, ladies and gentlemen, I'm Ronald Haver, and I'm here to do something which we feel is rather unique. I'm going to take you on a lecture tour of King Kong as you watch the film. The laserdisc technology offers us this opportunity and we feel it's rather unique — the ability to switch back and forth between the soundtrack and this lecture track.

== DVD and Blu-ray audio commentaries ==
DVDs, Blu-rays, and 4K Ultra HD Blu-rays have made audio commentary a key component of special features. They often include commentary from cinematographers, screenwriters, actors, producers, directors, film historians, film critics and subject matter experts. For example, American cinematographer Garrett Brown, the inventor of the steadicam, is featured throughout the audio commentary track for The Shining, where he discusses his work with the ground-breaking technology. The DVD of the science-fiction movie Sunshine, directed by Danny Boyle, contains an audio track with English physicist and professor of particle physics Brian Cox. In the cast commentary for The Silence of the Lambs, former F.B.I. criminal profiler John Douglas, an advisor to the filmmakers, offers his anecdotes about the film.

The box set of The Ultimate Matrix Collection, has two audio commentaries on each film, one by philosophers who loved it; Dr. Cornel West and Ken Wilber, and one by critics who hated it; Todd McCarthy, John Powers and David Thomson. The DVD release of Ghostbusters contains a video commentary track with director Ivan Reitman, Harold Ramis, and Joe Medjuck, with silhouettes of the trio added to imitate Mystery Science Theater 3000. The Blu-ray edition of the film Galaxy Quest includes a tongue-in-cheek trivia commentary called "Galactopedia", by American graphic designer Michael Okuda, known for his work on Star Trek, and Denise Okuda, co-author of the Star Trek Encyclopedia.

On the DVD release of Bowling for Columbine, Michael Moore allowed his interns, secretary and production assistants to record the audio commentary for his documentary. In the commentary for True Romance, Quentin Tarantino, who wrote the film script, explains why he didn't direct the movie himself, and the inspiration behind him writing the script. For The Goonies audio track, many of the original cast members, Sean Astin, Josh Brolin, Corey Feldman and Martha Plimpton, along with director Richard Donner, reunited and watched the film together, offering their opinions on the classic comedy film.

=== Film directors commentary ===
Film directors can also provide their perspective into how a film is made. In his commentary for the 1970 film M*A*S*H, director Robert Altman gives background information on production and on the way the script was used and misused. He also comments on problems he had with the studio in relation to the connection with the Vietnam War. Director Mel Brooks discusses in his audio commentary for Young Frankenstein how the movie was turned down by Columbia Pictures because its 2 million dollar budget was too high. He also points out the homages in his film, in relation to the history of Frankenstein movies.

Director Oliver Stone in his audio commentary for Wall Street, explains how his family influenced the making of the film, and speaks candidly about the actors, mildly criticizing them, particularly Charlie Sheen. In his commentary for the 2003 film Shattered Glass, director Billy Ray is joined by New Republic editor Chuck Long, who explains the differences between the film and the actual event. Ray, in his directorial debut, also admits his lack of experience, and how he relied on more experienced members of his production crew.

Director Francis Ford Coppola in his audio commentary about his epic film The Godfather, recounts how the original title of the film was supposed to be "Mario Puzo's The Godfather", but that "no one remembers it that way", and in the 2007 DVD release of Hearts of Darkness, a documentary about the production of Apocalypse Now, Coppola explains why it's not a good idea to film a movie in the Amazon jungle. He also talks about a scene in the film where Martin Sheen was drunk and cut his hand, and relays how the opening shot with a huge explosion in the jungle was completely unintentional.

=== Film historians and critics ===
Film historians are frequent contributors of audio commentary, including: Tim Lucas who has recorded numerous audio commentaries since his first, for Mario Bava's Black Sunday; Peter Cowie has provided commentaries for numerous DVDs of Ingmar Bergman's films, including Wild Strawberries, written and directed by Bergman; Donald Richie has recorded commentary tracks for many Japanese films; and respected historian Rudy Behlmer, who is primarily known for his audio commentaries of American classic cinema, most notably Casablanca, Gone with the Wind and Frankenstein. John Fricke has recorded, or participated in, several audio commentaries for Judy Garland's films, including The Wizard of Oz, Babes in Arms, Easter Parade, For Me and My Gal, Girl Crazy, Meet Me in St. Louis, and The Pirate.

Film critics are also frequent contributors to commentaries like: American film critic Roger Ebert who recorded DVD audio commentary tracks for many classic films, including Citizen Kane and Casablanca, and Richard Schickel who has provided commentary for Double Indemnity, Strangers on a Train, On the Waterfront and The Good, the Bad and the Ugly. Leonard Maltin has also offered commentary on several films including, Marx Brothers A Night at the Opera, and The Harold Lloyd Comedy Collection (volume 2).

Hong Kong action cinema expert Bey Logan is a frequent commenter for Asian films, including Fist of Fury, The Banquet, Iron Monkey, Musa and Bullet in the Head.

Animation historian Jerry Beck has recorded dozens of audio commentaries for animation productions, including Sinbad the Sailor and the Looney Tunes Golden Collection series, and historian Michael Barrier also regularly contributes commentary to selected shorts in DVD packages, including the Popeye the Sailor DVD series, and for the first five Looney Tunes Golden Collection DVD box sets.

== In-theater audio commentary ==
In-theater audio commentary is an audio track that is downloaded before going to a movie theater, and then played back on your device while watching the film. American director Kevin Smith was one of the first filmmakers to provide this feature with Clerks II. Rian Johnson provided in-theater commentary for The Brothers Bloom, Looper and Knives Out. John August also used in-theater commentary for The Nines.

== Television series ==
When complete seasons of TV series are released to DVD and Blu-ray boxsets, they often include audio commentary. Older classic shows like The Twilight Zone The Monkees, Night Gallery, The Brady Bunch, Dennis the Menace, Star Trek: The Original Series, Groucho Marx's You Bet Your Life, The Abbott and Costello Show, and The Smothers Brothers Comedy Hour have all featured audio commentaries by the cast, crew members and special guest stars.

Modern classics with commentaries from the creators, writers, directors and cast include (select few): Everybody Loves Raymond, One Tree Hill, Second City Television, Smallville, The Sopranos, Arrested Development, Buffy the Vampire Slayer, Sex and the City, Will & Grace, Game of Thrones, It's Always Sunny in Philadelphia, Seinfeld and Friends.

Animated TV series are also a genre that frequently provide audio commentaries, which include: My Little Pony: Friendship Is Magic and Nickelodeon's SpongeBob SquarePants. Classic cartoons include: The Flintstones, The Jetsons, and Tom and Jerry which have all been released with audio commentaries. Adult and cult classics with audio commentaries from creators, writers, directors and cast include: South Park, Beavis and Butt-Head, Robot Chicken and Aqua Teen Hunger Force.

== Music videos ==
On the DVD release of Queen's Greatest Video Hits 2, which features music videos with audio commentary, band members Brian May and Roger Taylor reflect on their memories and opinions of each video. On the 20th Anniversary Remastered Edition of Paul's Boutique, the Beastie Boys provide their insights on a downloadable hour long audio commentary, which offers "rambling" revelations into album characters like Johnny Ryall.

The 2000 Criterion DVD re-release of The Rolling Stones Gimme Shelter, a 1970 American documentary, features audio commentary from directors Albert Maysles and Charlotte Zwerin, along with collaborator Stanley Goldstein. The 2006 Fade to Red: Tori Amos Video Collection, a double DVD set, has commentary from Tori Amos on each video.

== Broadway plays ==
The 2011 Broadway revival of Godspell featured a downloadable ten-part audio commentary series from composer Stephen Schwartz and director Daniel Goldstein, who "discuss their process and personal experiences of creating the Broadway revival".

== Video games ==
Video game developers have also included audio commentaries in their games. Unlike DVD commentaries, in-game prompts are used to allow players to activate a relevant audio commentary for a specific area in the game. Star Wars Episode I: Battle for Naboo is believed to be the earliest video game with audio commentary. Other select video games with commentary include: Portal, Alan Wake, Monkey Island 2: LeChuck's Revenge Special Edition, Deus Ex Human Revolution Director's Cut, Grim Fandango Remastered, Day of the Tentacle Remastered, BioShock: The Collection, Firewatch, Duke Nukem 3D: 20th Anniversary World Tour, and Half-Life: Alyx.

== James Bond commentary ==
Controversy surrounded the audio commentary on Criterion's 1991 laserdisc release of the first three James Bond films, Dr. No, From Russia with Love and Goldfinger. Eon Productions notified Criterion of "185 statements in the audio commentaries which they considered to be 'inaccurate, insensitive, inflammatory or potentially libelous'". The audio tracks featured commentary from various members of the production crews who worked on the films. Amongst the offensive commentary; they criticized the budgets for the three films, gossiped about Sean Connery's weight gain during From Russia with Love, and "insinuated that several female costars were bad actors and had been cast solely for their looks". Additionally, when English film director Guy Hamilton was commenting about Goldfinger, which he directed, he referred to the fictional character Pussy Galore as a "dyke". In response to EON's complaints, Criterion discontinued the collection, and issued a recall of the unsold copies. The following year, they reissued the three films as single-disc versions, with all the extra features removed.

== Sources ==
- Barlow, Aaron (2005). "The DVD Audio Commentary". The DVD Revolution: Movies, Culture, and Technology. Westport, Connecticut: Praeger Publishers. pp. 109–127. ISBN 0-275-98387-0. LCCN 2004018109.
