= Near Myths =

British comic magazine

- Cover of Near Myths #3.

Publication information
- Format: Ongoing series
- Publication date: Sept. 1978–Apr. 1980
- No. of issues: 5
- Main character(s): Luther Arkwright; Gideon Stargrave

Creative team
- Written by: Grant Morrison, Bryan Talbot
- Artist(s): Grant Morrison, Graham Manley, Bryan Talbot
- Editor(s): Rob King (issues #1–4); Bryan Talbot (issue #5)

Near Myths was a British comic magazine published in Edinburgh during the late 1970s that only ran for five issues. The initial editor was Rob King and it was produced by Galaxy Media. Near Myths featured the first professionally published work of Grant Morrison, Graham Manley and Tony O'Donnell, and saw the start of Bryan Talbot's seminal graphic novel The Adventures of Luther Arkwright. Teenager Grant Morrison's contribution, Gideon Stargrave, later found his way into Morrison's Vertigo series The Invisibles.

== Publication history ==
O'Donnell credits Manley as inspiring the creation of Near Myths. Founding editor Rob King also ran a science fiction bookshop in Edinburgh. Deeply in debt, he ending up leaving town, abandoning both the shop and Near Myths. His landlord later broke in and eventually pulped leftover copies of the magazine. Bryan Talbot took over as editor for the magazine's final issue.

== Contents ==
- The Adventures of Luther Arkwright, by Bryan Talbot started its run in Near Myths.
  - "Napalm Kiss" (in Near Myths #1, September 1978)
  - "Shadows" (in Near Myths #2, October 1978)
  - "The Treaty of St Petersburg" (in Near Myths #3, December 1978)
  - "Point.Counter.Point" (in Near Myths #4, September 1979)
  - "The Adventures of Luther Arkwright; Chapters 1B, 2b & 4B (in Near Myths #5, April 1980)
- Grant Morrison (providing both art and script):
  - "Time is a Four-Lettered Word" (in Near Myths #2, October 1978)
  - "Gideon Stargrave" (in Near Myths #3-4, 1978–1979)
  - "The Checkmate Man" (in Near Myths #5, Apr. 1980)

== See also ==
- Pssst!
