= The Day of Forever (short story) =

1966 short story by J. G. Ballard

"The Day of Forever" is a 1966 science fiction short story by British writer J. G. Ballard, which was published in the anthology of the same title.

== Setting ==
The events of the story unfold on Earth at some undisclosed era in the future when the planet has ceased to rotate, hence the opening line, "At Columbine Sept Heures it was always dusk."

== Cultural references ==
Grant Morrison has stated that the hero of this story was the major inspiration for the character of Gideon Stargrave.
