= The Day of Forever =

Book by J.G. Ballard

- First edition
- Author: J. G. Ballard
- Language: English
- Genre: Science fiction
- Publisher: Panther
- Publication date: 1967
- Publication place: United Kingdom
- Media type: Print (paperback)
- Pages: 141 pp

The Day of Forever is a collection of science fiction short stories by the British writer J. G. Ballard.

== Contents ==
The Day of Forever contains the following stories:

- "The Day of Forever"
- "Prisoner of the Coral Deep"
- "Tomorrow is a Million Years"
- "The Man on the 99th Floor"
- "The Waiting Grounds"
- "The Last World of Mr Goddard"
- "The Gentle Assassin"
- "The Sudden Afternoon"
- "The Insane Ones"
- "The Assassination of John Fitzgerald Kennedy Considered as a Downhill Motor Race"

== Cultural references ==
Grant Morrison has said that the hero of the title story was the major inspiration for their character of Gideon Stargrave.

== Sources ==
- Tuck, Donald H. (1974). The Encyclopedia of Science Fiction and Fantasy. Chicago: Advent. p. 28. ISBN 0-911682-20-1.
