= Orbit Science Fiction =

- Orbit Science Fiction no.5 "The Last of the Masters", and author Philip K. Dick, are advertised on the front cover. Cover art by Ed Valigursky.
- Categories: Science fiction Pulp magazine
- Frequency: No. 1 - No. 2 (Irregular); No. 3 - No. 5 (Bi-monthly)
- Publisher: Hanro Corporation
- First issue: September 1953
- Final issue Number: November 1954; 5 issues

Orbit Science Fiction was an American science fiction magazine anthology published in 1953 and 1954 by the Hanro Corporation. Only 5 issues were published, each of which were edited by Donald A. Wollheim, although Jules Saltman was credited within the publication. Several prominent science fiction writers published short stories within Orbit, including Philip K. Dick, Donald A. Wollheim, and Michael Shaara. Each issue was published as a digest, and originally sold for $0.35.

== List of issues ==
- Orbit Science Fiction No.1, September 1953, 132pp.
- Orbit Science Fiction No.2, December 1953, 132pp.
- Orbit Science Fiction No.3, July–August 1954, Jul 1954, 132pp.
- Orbit Science Fiction No.4 September–October 1954, Sep 1954, 132pp.
- Orbit Science Fiction No.5, November–December 1954, Nov 1954, 132pp.

== See also ==
- List of defunct American periodicals
