= Anarchists (film) =

- DVD cover
- Hangul: 아나키스트
- RR: Anakiseuteu
- MR: Anak'isŭt'ŭ
- Directed by: Yoo Young-sik
- Written by: Park Chan-wook; Lee Moo-young; Bangnidamae
- Produced by: Lee Joon-ik
- Starring: Jang Dong-gun; Kim Sang-joong; Jung Joon-ho; Lee Beom-soo; Kim In-kwon; Ye Ji-won
- Cinematography: Kim Eung-taek
- Edited by: Kyung Min-ho
- Music by: Choi Man-shik; Choi Sun-shik; Im Ju-hee; Kim Young-kwan
- Production companies: CineWorld; Shanghai Film Studio
- Distributed by: Cineclick Asia
- Release date: April 29, 2000
- Running time: 100 minutes
- Country: South Korea
- Language: Korean

Anarchists is a 2000 South Korean action film directed by Yoo Young-sik and co-written by Park Chan-wook. Set in Shanghai in 1924, the film is about the Heroic Corps: a covert cell of insurrectionist anarchists who attempt to overthrow the Japanese government's occupation of Korea through propaganda of the deed. Told from the perspective of the youngest member, Sang-gu, years after the fact, the story is a sympathetic look at a group of revolutionaries through the eyes of one of their own.

== Plot ==
In the opening scene the protagonist begins to reminisce about his youth and remembers the day he was saved from execution in a raid performed by the anarchist cell he would later join. After reaching a safe house the group begins to teach him the tricks of their trade. He later takes part in several missions, though he continues to have difficulty throughout the film with the violence of his new job.

Eventually a string of tragic events strike the team. One of their members is fatally betrayed during a mission, leading to their covers being blown during the next. Now wanted by the Japanese and Chinese authorities, their funders turn away from them and instead choose to support socialist electoral politics to further their cause. This angers the group, and they leave the larger organization, attempting to survive on their own by earning money through gambling and bank robbery. Over time the group becomes agitated with simply scraping by and several voice a desire to return to their old ways of clandestine warfare. They collectively decide to strike at the Japanese government in a high-profile attack, leading up to a dramatic finale.

== Cast ==
- Jang Dong-gun as Sergei
- Jung Joon-ho as Lee Geun
- Kim Sang-joong as Han Myung-gon
- Lee Beom-soo as Dol-suk
- Kim In-kwon as Sang-gu
- Ye Ji-won as Kaneko

== Production notes and historical significance ==
Anarchists was the first Korean and Chinese co-production in the history of Korean cinema. The project was put together through the efforts of the Korean Film Commission and the international exchange division of the city of Busan, using connections they had been developing in Shanghai. The film was shot entirely in China over a period of three months in Shanghai and in towns nearby, with a budget of US$3,000,000. For Anarchists, the production team worked with a Chinese-based A-level staff who participated in the production of Chen Kaige's Farewell My Concubine and Temptress Moon. The actors and the core production staff came from Korea, while the production design, elaborate sets, supporting talent and hundreds of extras were supplied by the Shanghai Film Studio.

The film was co-winner of the audience choice award at the 2001 Cinequest Film Festival.

== See also ==
- Anarchism in Korea
- Korea under Japanese rule
- List of fictional anarchists
