= Graham Manley =

British comic artist

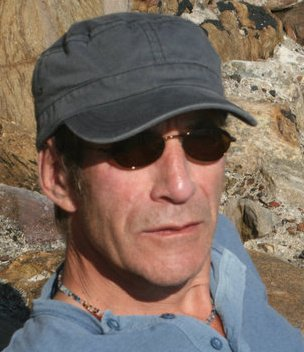
- Graham Manley
- Born: Bournemouth, England
- Area: Artist
- Notable works: Judge Dredd

Graham Manley is a British comic artist.

== Biography ==
Graham Manley has worked for a wide range of British comics, and is credited by Tony O'Donnell as inspiring the creation of Near Myths.

He has drawn episodes of Juliet November and Whatever Happened To...? for the Judge Dredd Megazine. He also co-created (with writer Pat Mills) the character Rick Fortune for Diceman comic.

He has also contributed to several volumes of The Big Book of collection for the DC imprint Paradox Press. Manley has produced full colour SF and fantasy comics in The Dandy Annual for several years.

Manley worked on the opening titles of the feature film 'Electric Man' where his original drawings of the character were animated into an impressive opening sequence.

The original sleeve art on roots reggae artist Prince Far I’s Cry Tuff Dub Encounter Chapter 3 album is by Graham Manley.

== Bibliography ==
- Near Myths
- "World of the Future" (in Knockabout #1, 1981)
- Diceman: "In The Bronx, No-one Can Hear You Scream!" (with Pat Mills, in Dice Man #2, 1986)
- The Big Book of: Conspiracies: "Killing Castro" (Paradox Press, 104–106, 1995)
- Juliet November: "Phoenix Falling" (with Alan Grant, in Judge Dredd Megazine #202–204, 2003)
- Judge Dredd: "Shakedown" (with John Wagner, in Judge Dredd Megazine #207–208, 2003)
- Whatever Happened To?: "Maria" (with Gordon Rennie, in Judge Dredd Megazine #215, 2004)
- Tales From the Black Museum: "Ruddler's Cuddlers" (with Simon Spurrier, in Judge Dredd Megazine #246, 2006)
- Battle for Planet Science (an educational comic for Planet Science, 2009)

== Record Sleeve Artwoork ==
- Cry Tuff Dub Encounter Chapter 3 -- Prince Far I & the Arabs (1980 ) on the Daddy Kool label
