= List of The Invisibles characters =

The Invisibles is a comic book created by Grant Morrison for the Vertigo imprint of DC Comics. This article is a list of all characters in the series.

== The Invisibles ==
The Invisibles are an organization of a freedom fighters at war with the oppressive Outer Church. Many members are psychic or possess some kind of supernatural ability.

=== Main cast ===
==== Jack Frost ====
Jack Frost is the alias of Dane McGowan, a rebellious teenager from Liverpool, England. Early in his childhood, Dane McGowan affects the cold, violently rebellious persona of "Jack Frost" in order to cope with his shattered home life. After trying to burn down his school, Dane is sent to Harmony House, a reeducation facility for young boys run by the Outer Church, the villains of the series. The Invisibles free Dane from Harmony House and arrange for him to be mentored by Tom O'Bedlam, an experienced Invisible. Under Tom O'Bedlam's guidance, Dane realizes that the "Jack Frost" persona is restricting his growth, a realization that allows a softer, more compassionate Dane to emerge. Dane is contacted by Barbelith, a mysterious sentient satellite featured in the series, during this time, though his memories of contact are repressed until he is ready to access them.

After being injured on a mission, Dane abandons his teammates and wanders through London, eventually returning home to Liverpool. While on the run, his hidden memories are triggered and he learns that he is a messiah. At first he rejects this responsibility, but he soon finds that he cannot ignore the empathy he now feels for the rest of the world. Later on, he remembers that during his first contact with Barbelith he was forced to endure the collective suffering of humanity throughout time. This memory spurs him to return to the Invisibles so that he may set things right. While Dane rejects their violent methods and their dualistic perception of the world, which he finds just as flawed as that of the Outer Church, he stays with them because they are his friends. Over the course of their adventures together, he is revealed the truth behind time, the creation of the universe, and his place in it. When he is ready, Dane starts his own Invisibles cell and, in 2012, oversees the end of the physical world as foreseen.

Dane is a powerful psychic and has many other undefined supernatural abilities.

==== King Mob ====
Once a horror writer named Gideon Starorzewski, King Mob is the leader of the cell of the Invisibles. He is the agent who recruited Jack Frost, and he is the lover of Ragged Robin.

==== Ragged Robin ====
Ragged Robin is the Invisibles' psychic operative, sent back from the future to bring the science of time travel to the Invisibles. She later becomes the group's leader when they (randomly) reassign their elemental roles.

Born in 1988, she joined the Invisibles at the age of 20 in 2008, when Mason Lang found her in a mental asylum. In 2012, she returned to 1990 in a "timesuit", making her the first person to travel by time. She was then found by the Invisible John-a-Dreams, who brought her to the cell she had previously joined in the future.

During the 1990s, when most of the story is set, she is still a member of the same cell. She becomes romantically involved with its new leader, King Mob, before replacing him as the leader. After explaining her futuristic past, she reveals the timesuit, still hidden from when she first returned. An Invisible scientist researching time (who would later build the timesuit and send her back in it) named Takashi repairs the timesuit and returns her to the year 2012, minutes after her departure.

Her name and look are based on the Raggedy Ann doll. She has some mental difficulties related to her time traveling – she introduces herself to Jack Frost by saying, "Hi, I'm Ragged Robin – I'm nuts".

==== Boy ====
"Boy" is Lucille Butler, an officer of the New York Police Department. Her brother Martin, also a police officer, was working for The Conspiracy, a fact known to a third brother, a gang member named "Eezy D", but not to Lucille. In a battle against the Outer Church, Eezy D is killed and Martin is taken prisoner. Lucille's life is saved by her partner, although he cautions her that the Invisibles will be looking for her. Hoping they will help her rescue her brother Martin, Lucille allows herself to be recruited by the Invisibles, who give her the code name "Boy", who becomes somewhat of a mentor to Jack Frost, and their relationship eventually develops into a romantic one. Boy later steals an artifact known as the "Hand of Glory" and goes searching for the secret prison camp in which she believes Martin to be detained. Boy is abducted by the Outer Church and informed that her identities as "Boy" and "Lucille Butler", among others, were entirely fabricated, and that she was secretly an operative sent to retrieve the Hand of Glory for the "Lost Ones", who plan to use its power to destroy the sun. Boy, however, still refuses to kill King Mob. Following this, it is revealed that the ostensible agents of the Outer Church are in fact members of Invisibles Cell #23, who have been deprogramming Boy to defuse a previous hypnotic suggestion from the real Outer Church. When she realizes that there is no way to save Martin, and there never had been, Boy quits the Invisibles forever, and she starts a new life in New York, where she later has a child.

==== Lord Fanny ====
Lord Fanny is a trans woman sorceress who was recruited into the Invisibles by John-a-Dreams. She is shown to be quite powerful, destroying Mr. Quimper and banishing the demon Orlando. Born male into a matrilineal family of brujas, she was raised as a girl and put through a blood rite of passage as a child where she faced Mictlantecuhtli, the Aztec god of death and gained magical powers and the knowledge of their whole life.

=== Most frequent allies ===
In addition to the cell of five first led by King Mob, then Ragged Robin, there are other Invisibles (from other cells) who frequently work together with the main characters.

- Jolly Roger is a member of the all-lesbian cell of the Invisibles known as the "Poison Pussies". She discovers a hidden station in Dulce, New Mexico run by the United States government with the assistance of "ultraterrestrials" called "Lost Ones". The station contains the remains of her deceased lover, but also the secret vaccine for the AIDS virus. Mind controlled (to an extent) by Mr. Quimper, Roger convinces the Invisibles to storm the station. She later, when Quimper's control of her is broken by Ragged Robin, operates with King Mob's group like a steady member. Her other operations involve a (this time successful) assault on Dulce, and the crashing of the Moonchild ceremony. She is murdered by Miles Delacourt.
- Jim Crow: A houngan and musician, Jim Crow is first encountered by the Invisibles investigating a new variety of crack cocaine that turns its users into mindless undead. Crow later learns that the leaders of the pharmaceutical company behind the drug are using it to experience the brutal acts of the zombies vicariously. Crow kills them all with this assistance of a scorpion-shaped loa called "Baron Zaraguin". He later goes on to further missions with the Invisibles. Crow is one of the most morally ambiguous characters in the series, since he does what he feels is right, but during operations he must always make a sacrifice to the Death God, and at one point risks killing off the entire American Southwest to satisfy the urges of Zaraguin.
- Helga is a Scandinavian linguist and computer code expert who creates a language program for the Invisibles to use against the Outer Church, and a "cut and paste" (partially photography-based) grimoire that is essential to take control over the Moonchild ritual. She appears to be somewhat of an overachiever in linguistics, having translated Winnie-the-Pooh to !Kung and experimenting with alien languages to great physical risk. She tortures Sir Miles through a combination of alien glossary and a serum that allows words to be perceived as immediate truth. Her destabilizing of and language-hypnotic control over Miles is instrumental in bringing him down. Her real name is Olga Tannen.
- Mason Lang: Billionaire sympathizer with (and financer of) the Invisibles' cause, Mason Lang received information in a dream (or alien abduction) about the possibilities of storing information on molecules of water, a science which becomes his life's work. He tricks the United States government into retaining his services to help them understand a prototype time machine. He also sells software and technology to the government, in which he installs back door access, which eventually puts the entire military-industrial complex under his control. In 2012, the proliferation of "smart drinks" makes it seem as if Lang eventually succeeded with his water molecule project. It is stated in the third volume that he died sometime before 2012, although it is never specifically revealed how.
- Takashi Satoh is a time-scientist who works for Mason Lang on his time machine group. Part of Ragged Robin's mission is to bring back some items in time that will trigger Satoh's inspiration for building the time machine, making her mission a causal loop. He is seemingly killed in 2012, as the Archons breach the laboratory.
- Elfayed is a Middle-Eastern high master in the Invisible College. He takes charge of Jack Frost's training later in the series after Jack accepts his fate.

==== The 1920s Cell ====
- Queen Mab is a psychic woman, Beryl Wyndham, from circa 1924 who is a leading figure in Edith Manning's cell. She is romantically involved with both Edith Manning and King Mob I. She is betrayed and murdered by Sir Miles in 1965.
- King Mob I is an anarchist revolutionary, Ronald Tolliver, from circa 1924 who is part of Edith Manning's entourage. King Mob (II) remarks that he is the only one in his cell who is not obviously English upper-class. He is killed during the Spanish Civil War in 1937. "Ron Tolliver" is the name of an off-camera conspirator in Robert Heinlein's novel The Cat Who Walks Through Walls.
- Edith Manning is a "flapper" of the Roaring Twenties who helps the Invisibles obtain an artifact called the "Hand of Glory". She also helps King Mob activate it by anointing it with their bodily fluids from a sex act. She remains an active member of the Invisibles until her natural death at the age of 99. Apparently her family have a tradition of Invisible activity, her uncle (Tom O' Bedlam's father) being a 'Grand Magus' in what appears to be an Occultist Invisibles cell.
- Tom O'Bedlam is a repressed, arrogant and rather snobbish boy from the 1920s, who is drawn into the libertine Invisible cell of his cousin Edith Manning partially due to his crush on her, partially as a form of rebellion against his father's more conservative (in terms of ritual) brand of invisibilism. He goes mad during the Hand of Glory ritual, and is later in life seen as a semi-mad derelict. He helps Jack Frost realize his powers, for all purposes being his mentor. Tom commits suicide by leaping off a skyscraper, in order to awaken Jack. He hints that his mission of mentoring Jack was the only thing that kept him from seeking death. After Tom's death it is revealed that he became the most powerful magician of his species (fulfilling the stated goal of Edith's callous treatment), the inference being that other races exist, surpassing human psychic ability.
- Billy Chang is a Chinese mystic who is part of Edith Manning's entourage. He is an expert when it comes to relics, and understands a great deal about the Hand of Glory. He disappears without a trace following the Hand of Glory ritual.

==== Division X ====
Division X are a small band of police officers who investigate bizarre and inexplicable crimes and phenomena. Although out of commission when The Invisibles starts, they are brought back together at the end of volume one and soon find themselves on the trail of The Outer Church. Division X itself is based on the TV show Department S, and each of the officers resembles a famous TV detective character. An explanation for this is given in volume 3.

- Paddy Crowley (based on George Cowley from The Professionals): "The Right Honourable Sir Patrick Crowley" is an old Eton student and former acquaintance of Sir Miles. The two don't really get along anymore. Paddy Crowley participates in the 'brainwashing' of Sir Miles by Helga, but is killed by Orlando in the Moonchild ritual.
- George Harper (based on George Carter from The Sweeney) is unapologetically beer-drinking and porn-loving, somewhat of a 'slacker' at the first impression, but has psychic and weapons skills that aren't to be trifled with.
- Jon Six (based on Jason King from Department S and Jason King, his name may also be based on that of Number Six, the protagonist of the television series The Prisoner) is an Invisible known as "Mister Six" who was undercover as Jack Frost's history teacher when Frost was still "Dane McGowan". He is widely considered one of the more knowledgeable people in the world when it comes to magic and conspiracies, and appears to be driven by a fundamental need to always know more. While attempting to deprogram Jack Flint into realizing the entire Division X are Invisibles under cover, Six is shot by George Harper but survives. The Harlequinade invites him to "rejoin the ultimate conspiracy", after which he is seen to have an even stronger mastery of arcane arts. Together with Helga, he guides Jack Frost into the world of the Outer Church during the Moonchild ritual.
- Jack Flint (based on Jack Regan from The Sweeney) is an agent of "Division X". Flint is captured by Purves and his numerous identities are stripped away, leaving him into a state where he speaks in tongues and alien phonemes. During his deconstruction he realizes that he is, at some level, also John-A-Dreams. Emerging from the deconstruction, he claims that his body is merely a 'fiction suit' used to experience the Invisibles, and at the Moonchild ceremony he permits himself to be killed by the demon Orlando, knowing that this is what is going to happen anyway.

==== The 2000s ====
Many characters from earlier in the series are obviously present in the part of the series set in the years between 1998 and 2012. Some very few characters are, however, era-specific.

- Reynard is a future Invisible who claims that instead of a personality she has a "memeplex", allowing her to choose between identities. Dane McGowan recruits her at her school in Seattle, where he is underground posing as a school teacher—much like Mister Six in Liverpool twenty years earlier. Her initiation into the Invisibles consists partially of three years spent as an accountant. She breaks into Technocorp with Dane McGowan, and is present at the "ground zero" when the time machine is launched.

==== Other allies ====
These are other notable Invisibles or pro-Invisible actors that the series brings up from time to time.

- Oscar is a slightly overweight Invisible with poor manners who initially acts as Boy's patrol partner. He is involved in her deprogramming procedure, and active in an American Invisibles cell that uses sketchy methods (according to King Mob, at least).
- Coyote is an Invisible who is involved in Boy's deprogramming procedure.
- Georgie Girl: As above.
- Shanjeet is an Indian woman who travels with King Mob during the first few issues of volume III while he is in disguise. It is unclear whether they are romantically involved.
- Papa Skat: An Invisible from circa 1924, he first appears as an adversary to Edith, but it is later revealed that he was merely testing her.
- Purves is at first seemingly an Outer Church agent, but it is revealed that he works with Mister Six to 'deprogram' Division X into realizing that they are the Invisibles they have been searching for all along. Following this he also works with Helga to 'brainwash' Sir Miles.
- Christine Sherman
- The Marquis de Sade: An aristocrat, revolutionary and author of philosophy-laden, sadomasochistic novels from the 18th century, De Sade is brought forward in time by the Invisibles to create a "pocket utopia". He is depicted as being crippled, short, and morbidly overweight. He effectively creates a large Inivisible cell at a manor complex where people experiment with different kinds of sexual activity, often involving heavy doses of role play. Both physically and in terms of what he does, he is a mirror image of the Outer Church's Mr. Quimper.
- Mary Shelley: A romantic poet, women's rights' activist and mother to Percy Shelley's children, she appears more grounded in reality than her somewhat fleeting mate. She is seen receiving an apple from, and discussing with, the Blind Chessplayer.
- Percy Shelley is a romantic poet, atheist, radical, and vegetarian who is seen having a discussion with Lord Byron in Venice, Italy in 1819. Shelley explains that he intends for his writings to act as a map that will help guide the world to a day when all "men and women will be equal and free from tyranny, free of God and fear".
- Lord Byron is a romantic poet, atheist, radical, and "club-footed sodomite" who is seen having a discussion with Percy Shelley in Venice, Italy in 1819. Although a member of the Invisible College like Shelley, Byron is much more pessimistic about the likelihood of creating a utopian society, believing that "men are like sheep and will obey anyone who kicks their arses hard enough".

== The Outer Church ==
The Outer Church exists in the "unhealthy" universe, where conformity and hierarchy consume individuality and free will. The demon-like Archons of the Outer Church wish to enslave humanity and rob them of everything that cannot be measured, weighed and counted. The Outer Church's representatives on Earth are politicians, policemen, royalty and other representatives of control and order. They run the secret conspiracies that attempt to keep all of humanity docile and malleable.

- King Archon/Abbadon/Rex Mundi is the ruler of the Archons. It is the plan of Sir Miles and other human servitors of the Outer Church to bring him to our world through the coronation of the Moonchild, after which he is to possess the body of the Moonchild and thereby take direct and total control over all life on Earth. He is never shown, and perhaps actually non-existent. The attempted possession of Dane McGowan by the entity seems to have no effect at all, although Dane claims he "ate it".
- King-of-All-Tears: This Archon is a vaguely humanoid figure standing over seven feet tall and wearing flowing dark-green robes. His face is reminiscent of a black, fanged and horned equine-like skull with a long vertebrae-like protuberance on the top of his head. Two curved white horns jut up from his shoulders. His fingers appear as either a cluster of tentacles or long talons. When preparing for battle, he emits a howl "summoning his weapons—his cloak of inks, his neuroworm larvae and nanofactories". It is shown that being unprotected in the same room as him for a longer period of time causes rampant, fast-breeding skin cancer. The King-of-All-Tears is the direct master of Ms. Dwyer, who summons him to the House of Fun during Miles Delacourt's interrogation of King Mob and Lord Fanny. He later tries to prevent Ragged Robin from traveling back in time from 2012. The King claims his name is due to the fact that he "weeps for the end of the era" and all that he (a King of this World) has built. He is banished at one time by Dane McGowan on threat of saying "his [real] name", and King Mob eventually destroys him utterly by dosing him with logoplasm (a substance that makes words seem real) and shooting him with a pop gun.
- King-in-Chains is a vaguely humanoid figure standing over seven feet tall and wearing a tattered dark-purple robe with chains trailing out from underneath it. His nobbed, featureless black head has a vertical slit down the center that emits a white light. He has long, slender, filth-covered talon-like fingers. He is the direct master of Mr. Gelt, headmaster of Harmony House, who is killed by King Mob during his rescue of Dane McGowan.
- Two other Archons are also shown, but never named.
- Sir Miles Delacourt: A master of conspiracies, Miles Delacourt is a director of the Secret Intelligence Service, a high ranking Freemason, and the controlling force behind the plot to install Rex Mundi as Monarch of the United Kingdom. Delacourt, although of English nobility, seems to have been a beatnik at one point, but during a series of Project MKULTRA-like experiments with LSD his visions lead him to believe that at the end of history "the Machine" wins, and ultimately there are no other choices than being slave or master. He betrays his circle, writing a book titled The Invisibles which scandalizes Queen Mab, and later kills her as token of his willingness to serve the conspiracy. Although he develops into a cold-blooded human monster who hunts the homeless for sport, he still does not seem entirely capable of 'shaking off' the wrongness of his first murder. After the failure of the Outer Church's plot to use Jack Frost as a host for the King-Archon, Miles proposes to serve Helga (who has taken control over him to a certain degree) but is rejected. Mister Six hands him a rope, and he takes this to imply that his only responsibility left is to remove himself from the stage. He then commits suicide by jumping from the aisles in Westminster Abbey, after singing a verse of the Eton Boating Song.
- Mister Quimper is the owner of a strip club whose employees claim to have been coerced into performing in porn movies with aliens. Quimper is capable of lodging a part of himself in bad, repressed memories like a virus and use these memories to eventually delete the identity of the victim and take total control. He claims that when the bad memories 'burst', victims will ask him actively to take control in order to blank out the pain. He is psychically devastated by Ragged Robin, and has to be taken to the Outer Church by Colonel Friday to be restored. The Invisibles successfully execute a mission to get Ragged Robin close enough to Quimper to remove his Outer Church programming and find out who or what he really is, which is a spirit of some sort, given flesh and viciously abused at the hands of the same perpetrators who once gang-raped Lord Fanny. Quimper disappears after realizing what he once was.
- Colonel Friday is the chief of the hidden station at Dulce, New Mexico in which the vaccine for the AIDS virus is kept. Friday also wields the "Scorpio" machine, which can implant horrible fears in the human mind. He is a modified servant of the Archons, and claimed by the Blind Chessman to be one of the first that the Archons approached for modification, all the way back in 1945. He is murdered by the Outer Church after failing twice to protect Dulce from the Invisibles.
- Orlando is a demon assassin. He encounters Lord Fanny once in Mictlan and twice on Earth. The latter encounters both end in his banishment back to Mictlan. Orlando enjoys wearing the skin of the people he murders. He cuts a finger from Jack Frost, and kills Jack Flint. Like Quimper, the Chessman, Elfayed and Jack Flint, there is an aspect of John-A-Dreams in him.
- Ms. Dwyer is a modified servant of the Archons, first introduced as an administrator at Harmony House. She later takes charge of Sir Miles' attempts to interrogate King Mob. Ms. Dwyer's body is host to a great deal of Archon technology, including 4D armor and nanites in her blood. She is sacrificed by Jim Crow as payment for his successful rescue operation of King Mob and Lord Fanny from the House of Fun.
- Mr. Gelt is a modified servant of the Archons, first introduced as an administrator at Harmony House. He is killed by King Mob.
- Brodie is an assassin hired by Sir Miles to seduce Lord Fanny for the purpose of learning information about King Mob. He apparently is genuinely attracted to Lord Fanny, but work is work. Lord Fanny stabs him to death.
- The Moonchild is a grotesque, 200-year-old creature which is part Archon and part English Royalty, inspired by the myth of the Monster of Glamis. It is kept behind a magic mirror. The Moonchild is intended to be used as a host for Rex Mundi, the ruler of The Outer Church. How much the monster actually understands of everything is questionable, as it appears to be almost completely witless, innocent like a wild animal. Sir Miles kills it, when it is revealed that according to the most secret of the Outer Church's plans, it was intended to symbolize the death of the old order, and that it is Dane McGowan who is supposed to be the host for the Rex Mundi.
- Queen Elizabeth II is present at the Abbey and crowns the Moonchild.

== Allegiances Unclear ==
There are several characters in The Invisibles who appear to take no side in the struggle between the Invisibles and the Outer Church – sometimes helping one, sometimes the other. They reflect the message that the struggle is, at some level, a false construct, and that something entirely else is going on behind the scenes.

- Barbelith is an artificial satellite hidden on the dark side of the moon. It functions as a psychic "placenta" for humanity, getting in touch with all humans who attain "higher consciousness" and gently guiding them through the transition. It is also stated that humanity created Barbelith for the purpose of saving them. When in contact with Barbelith, some experience it as alien abduction, some anchor the experience in religious imagery – it depends on the individual at hand. Upon being discovered by astronauts, Barbelith explodes, at the moment of universe's evolution to the next form.
- The Blind Chessman appears in different disguises throughout the story, helping different sides in the battle. At one point, for example, he is seen to be the superior of Colonel Friday, yet his actual function at that point of the story is to guide Jack Frost through visions that greatly help him. He is surrounded by 'serpent' imagery, particularly apples, and at one point claims that his stories were written out of the Bible during the church meeting of Nicea.
- The Harlequinade/The King in Yellow is a group of three harlequins who occasionally guide the Invisibles. In their "King in Yellow" aspect, they are also seen as commanding Sir Miles. They at one point show Mister Six visions like those the Blind Chessman shows Jack Frost, asking Six to "rejoin the ultimate conspiracy". Mister Six later describes them as "as alien as the air between your fingers", and says that they are "like us", but it is still never resolved who or what exactly they are. What is clear is that they hold ownership over the Hand of Glory, and are associated with the act of stepping out of linear time.
- John-A-Dreams is the Invisible who introduces Ragged Robin to King Mob's cell, and is one of the more mysterious characters in the series. He vanishes in Philadelphia under unclear circumstances, and is replaced in King Mob's cell by Jack Frost. The Invisibles encounter him again at the Moonchild ceremony, by which time he has seemingly turned an agent of the Outer Church, but he does not actually prevent them from intervening in the ritual. Instead he explains that the Philadelphia experience sent him into a 'time machine' (e.g. allowed him to see and move behind the illusion of lineal time) and attempts to explain something about the nature of reality to Lord Fanny. Apparently several of the other characters have an aspect of him in themselves, despite having their own backstories: Mr. Quimper, a corrupted being of the Outer Church who dresses like John-A-Dreams, claims to have "once been called John"; and Jack Flint, an anti-Invisible agent who turns out to be an Invisible under cover who had forgotten that his assumed identity was a cover story, at one point after having his identities deconstructed says that "John-a-Dreams is a complex structure... there's a name we all used for a while". The deconstructed Flint, who has realized that he is both 'Jack Flint' and 'John-A-Dreams' appears to know exactly what is going to happen during the Moonchild ritual. Grant Morrison has stated that John is like a "midwife" for the world as it moves towards "birth", and that one should "always look for the white suit". Other characters in the series that occasionally wear white suits are Mr. Quimper, Elfayed, Orlando and The Blind Chessman.
