= Italian destroyer Francesco Nullo =

Francesco Nullo was the name of at least two ships of the Italian Navy and may refer to:

- Italian destroyer Francesco Nullo (1914), a Rosolino Pilo-class destroyer launched in 1914. Renamed Fratelli Cairoli in 1921 and sunk in 1940.
- Italian destroyer Francesco Nullo (1925), a Sauro-class destroyer launched in 1925 and sunk in 1940.
