= Aaron Barlow =

American writer & academic (1951-2021)

- Born: 19 December 1951; Durham, North Carolina, U.S.
- Died: January 11, 2021 (aged 69); Brooklyn, New York, U.S.
- Occupation: Professor
- Writing career
- Genre: Cultural Studies
- Notable work: The Rise of the Blogosphere
- Website: onefleweast.net

Aaron Barlow (19 December 1951 – 11 January 2021) was a Cultural Studies scholar and a Professor of English at New York City College of Technology of the City University of New York.

== Background ==
Barlow was born in Durham, North Carolina. He earned his B.A. at Beloit College and his M.A. and Ph.D. at The University of Iowa with a dissertation on Philip K. Dick.

== Career ==
Barlow specialized in the impact of technology on contemporary American culture. His series of 'blogosphere' books, The Rise of the Blogosphere, Blogging America: The New Public Sphere, and Beyond the Blogosphere: Information and Its Children (with Robert Leston), explores the impact of New Media on American society and culture. He has also written two books related to film and the film industry, The DVD Revolution: Movies, Culture, and Technology and Quentin Tarantino: Life at the Extremes. More recently, he has moved into other areas, producing The Cult of Individualism: A History of an Enduring American Myth (2013) and The Depression Era: A Historical Exploration of Literature (2016) and has edited Doughboys on the Western Front: Memories of American Soldiers in the Great War (2016) as well as the two-volume set Star Power: The Impact of Branded Celebrity (2014).

In 2011, he edited a volume of essays written by Returned Peace Corps Volunteers called One Hand Does Not Catch a Buffalo in celebration of the 50th anniversary of the Peace Corps, Barlow himself having served in Togo (88–90). The book won a silver medal in the Travel Essay category of the 2011 Independent Publisher Book Awards His academic career includes two years as a senior lecturer at the University of Ouagadougou in Burkina Faso as a Fulbright Fellow from 1985 to 1987. Since 2013, he has been Faculty Editor of Academe, the magazine of the American Association of University Professors (AAUP) and executive editor of the Academe blog. In 2016, he wrote regularly for Salon on political issues but stopped after the November election. His article "The Triumph of the Lie: How Honesty and Morality Died in Right-Wing Politics" appeared in the Summer 2017 issue of The Public Eye.

== Selected publications ==
- ¿Cuánto te Asusta el Caos? Política, Religión y Filosofía en la obra de Philip K. Dick 2003. ISBN 9788496013056.
- The DVD Revolution: Movies, Culture, and Technology. 2004. ISBN 0275983870.
- The Rise of the Blogosphere. 2007. ISBN 0275989968.
- Blogging America: The New Public Sphere. 2007. ISBN 027599872X.
- Quentin Tarantino: Life at the Extremes. 2010. ISBN 031338004X.
- One Hand Does Not Catch a Buffalo. Editor. 2011. ISBN 1609520009.
- Beyond the Blogosphere: Information and Its Children with Robert Leston. 2011. ISBN 0313392870.
- The Cult of Individualism: A History of an Enduring American Myth. 2012. ISBN 9781440828294.
- Star Power: The Impact of Branded Celebrity. Editor. 2014. ISBN 9780313396175.978-1-61069-705-7
- The Depression Era: A Historical Exploration of Literature. 2016. ISBN 978-1-61069-705-7.
- Doughboys on the Western Front: Memories of American Soldiers in the Great War. Editor. 2016. ISBN 978-1-4408-4374-7.
- The 25 Sitcoms that Changed Television. Edited with Laura Westengard. 2018. ISBN 978-1440838866.
- Pop Goes the Decade: The Sixties. With Martin Kich. 2020. ISBN 978-1440862847.
- The Manhattan Project and the Dropping of the Atomic Bomb. Editor. 2020. ISBN 978-1440859434.
