= Lord Fanny =

Comic book character

- The cover of The Invisibles volume 2, issue #14, illustrated by Brian Bolland.

Publication information
- Publisher: Vertigo imprint of DC Comics
- First appearance: The Invisibles #2 (1994)
- Created by: Grant Morrison (writer); Steve Yeowell (artist)

In-story information
- Alter ego: Hilde Morales
- Team affiliations: The Invisibles
- Abilities: Magical adept Psychic; Shaman

Lord Fanny is a fictional character in the comic book series The Invisibles, a series published by DC Comics as a part of that company's Vertigo imprint. She is a shaman and a trans woman.

== History ==
Fanny was assigned male at birth and given the name Hilde Morales in Brazil in 1972. This angered her grandmother who was the most feared witch in the city and wanted her lineage continued. Since men could not become witches, Hilde's grandmother raised the child as a girl.

Hilde's mother was murdered in 1979, and shortly afterwards Hilde underwent magical initiation in Teotihuacan at which it was revealed her patron goddess was Tlazōlteōtl, deity of filth and lust. By 1990 Hilde had become a prostitute in Brazil, a career which ended when she was brutally raped at a party. She briefly contemplated suicide before joining The Invisibles, a group of freedom fighters who want to free mankind from oppression at the hands of extradimensional demons, at the request of one of the cell leaders, John-a-Dreams.

Similar to her meeting with the god Mictlāntēcutli, during which she is granted a great deal of magical powers because she made the death-god laugh, Fanny and Jack Frost dance for an entity called "Harlequinade", who gives them an artifact known as the "Hand of Glory" in exchange. During an invasion of the "Dulce facility", she destroys Mr. Quimper, and she later banishes the demon Orlando.

In the story's future, in 2012, Fanny is shown to be obese and dissipated.

== Powers and abilities ==
Lord Fanny has shamanic abilities that include an ability to summon "logoplasm", a "living word substance" that could accomplish magical feats. These powers were not concretely defined, but rather reflect the meta-language pre-occupations of author Grant Morrison.
