= Null-O =

- Short story by Philip K. Dick
- Country: United States
- Language: English
- Genre: Science fiction

Publication

"Null-O" is a 1958 science fiction short story by American writer Philip K. Dick. It examines the concept of totally unempathic and 'logical' humans ("Null-Os") in a parody of the plot and concepts of The Pawns of Null-A by A. E. van Vogt. These beings view individual collections of matter, i.e. any object, as subjective structures and see the true state of reality as an 'undifferentiated world of pure energy'. They can also move their ears independently, giving them excellent hearing. After attaining positions of power they proceed with a plan to ultimately return everything in the universe to this state. This is to be done by the construction of successively more powerful bombs, ultimately resulting in the rather improbable 'U-bomb' that will homogenise the whole universe. The Null-O plan is halted, however, when the 'ordinary' people of the world, who have survived the nuclear destruction of Earth's surface in the shelters built by their employers, rise up in drilling machines to stop the construction of an 'E-Bomb' designed to destroy Earth, and succeed in destroying both the E-Bomb prototype and the Null-O's themselves.

The idea of humans without empathy is central in Dick's later works, such as Do Androids Dream of Electric Sheep?.

This story was initially published in If, and was later collected in The Second Variety.
