= The Invisibles =

Comic book series written by Grant Morrison

- Cover to (vol. 2) #1, art by Brian Bolland. Clockwise from top left: Jack Frost, Lord Fanny, Boy, King Mob, Ragged Robin

Publication information
- Publisher: Vertigo
- Schedule: Monthly
- Format: Ongoing series
- Genre: Anarchist, science fantasy
- Publication date: September 1994 – October 1996 (vol. 1); February 1997 – February 1999 (vol. 2); April 1999 – June 2000 (vol. 3)
- No. of issues: 25 (vol. 1); 22 (vol. 2); 12 (vol. 3)

Creative team
- Created by: Grant Morrison
- Written by: Grant Morrison
- Artist: Various
- Letterer(s): Clem Robins; Todd Klein

Collected editions
- Say You Want a Revolution: ISBN 1-56389-267-7
- Apocalipstick: ISBN 1-56389-702-4
- Entropy in the U.K.: ISBN 1-56389-728-8
- Bloody Hell in America: ISBN 1-56389-444-0
- Counting to None: ISBN 1-56389-489-0
- Kissing Mister Quimper: ISBN 1-56389-600-1
- The Invisible Kingdom: ISBN 1-4012-0019-2

The Invisibles is a comic book series published by the Vertigo imprint of DC Comics from 1994 to 2000. It was created and scripted by Scottish writer Grant Morrison, and drawn by various artists throughout its publication.

The series loosely follows the doings of a single cell of The Invisible College, a secret organization battling against physical and psychic oppression using time travel, magic, meditation, and physical violence.

For most of the series, the team includes leader King Mob; Lord Fanny, a transgender Brazilian shaman; Boy, a former member of the NYPD; Ragged Robin, a telepath with a mysterious past; and Jack Frost, a young hooligan from Liverpool who may be the next Buddha. Their primary enemy are the Archons of the Outer Church, interdimensional alien gods who have already enslaved most of the human race without their knowledge.

== Publication history ==
The Invisibles was Morrison's first major creator-owned title for DC Comics and part of its mature Vertigo line. It drew from their Zenith strip as well as 1990s conspiracy culture. Their intent was to create a hypersigil to jump-start the culture in a more positive direction.

The title initially sold well but sales dipped sharply during the first series during the poorly received Arcadia arc, leading to concerns that the series might be cancelled outright. To counteract this, Morrison suggested a "wankathon" in the hope of bringing about a magical increase in sales by a mass of fans simultaneously masturbating at a set time. Phil Jiminez taking over art duties, and a more conventional story style in volume 2, may have helped as well.

Morrison became seriously ill while writing the book, something they attribute to working on the title and the manner in which its magical influence affected them, and has stated that their work on the comic made them into a different person from the one who started it. They have also said that much of the story was told to them by aliens when they were abducted during a trip to Kathmandu.

The third and final series was meant to be a countdown to the new millennium but shipping delays meant the final issue did not appear until April 2000. All of the series have been collected in a set of trade paperbacks.

Morrison saw the series censored due to the publisher's concern over the possibility of paedophilic and child abuse content. The first such case was in volume one, issue 7 ("Arcadia part 3: 120 Days Of Sod All"); dialogue was altered in one scene where a group rapes and degrades several nameless characters, and the term lost souls was used to ensure the characters could not be identified as children, as in the Marquis de Sade's original 120 Days of Sodom, the book the characters find themselves trapped in. Later in the series the names of people and organizations were simply blacked out, much to Morrison's dismay. DC had one line that originally read "Walt Disney was a crap" blacked out at the suggestions of their lawyers; many of these examples of censorship were restored when reprinted in trade paperback.

The title was optioned to be made into a television series by BBC Scotland, but neither this nor an optioned film version have been made. Morrison wrote The Filth for Vertigo in 2002, which they describe as a companion piece to The Invisibles, though there is no other connection between the two titles.

== Plot summary ==
=== Volume 1 ===
==== Say You Want a Revolution ====
The first volume of The Invisibles introduces Dane McGowan, an angry teen from Liverpool, as he attempts to burn down his school. Abandoned by his father and neglected by his mother, Dane takes out his anger and frustration through destruction. In the first issue of the series, Dane is recruited by the Invisibles, a ragtag band of freedom fighters led by King Mob, a charismatic, cold-blooded assassin. The next arc, "Down and Out in Heaven and Hell", shows Dane as he tries to survive on his own in London after being abandoned by the Invisibles. Dane is mentored by Tom O'Bedlam, an elderly homeless man who is secretly a member of the Invisibles, with clear influences from King Lear. Tom shows Dane the magic in the everyday world and helps him realize that his anger prevents him from experiencing real emotions. While wandering with Tom, Dane has a partially remembered alien abduction experience and is transported into a different dimension. Eventually Dane returns to the Invisibles, taking the codename "Jack Frost". The next arc, "Arcadia", follows the Invisibles as they go back in time via astral projection to the French Revolution. Jack is almost killed by a demonic agent of the Outer Church, the Invisibles' chief enemy. As the arc closes, Jack declares that he is leaving the Invisibles.

==== Apocalipstick ====
The first volume continues with Jack Frost abandoning the Invisibles. The tragic past of Lord Fanny, a Brazilian transgender woman and a member of King Mob's Invisibles cell, is revealed in a story arc titled "She-Man", which jumps back and forth through time. After an encounter with an agent of the Outer Church, both King Mob and Lord Fanny are captured. The volume closes with a look at Jack as he evades both the Invisibles and the Outer Church in London. Jack remembers his abduction experience from the previous volume, recalling that his alien captors told him that he is the messiah. Jack is approached by Sir Miles, a high-ranking member of the Outer Church, who tries to recruit him. Jack refuses and battles Sir Miles telepathically. After winning the psychic duel, Jack escapes again, this time to Liverpool. This volume also introduces Jim Crow, a Haitian Invisible and Voodoo practitioner, and the Moonchild, a monstrous being who will one day be crowned the next King of England. The twelfth issue of the series, "Best Man Fall", fleshes out the character of a soldier King Mob killed in the previous volume, and is considered by some to be the best single issue in the series.

==== Entropy in the U.K. ====
Sir Miles' interrogates King Mob in an arc titled "Gideon Stargrave in Entropy in the U.K." Ragged Robin and Boy, the other members of King Mob's Invisibles cell, team up with Jim Crow to rescue their teammates. In the 20th issue of the series, Boy reflects on her past while taking a train to Liverpool to bring Jack back into the fold. In the following issue, "Liverpool", Jack returns to his mother's flat where he tells her everything that has happened to him since joining the Invisibles. He admits that he is scared of the responsibilities that he now has as humanity's saviour and no longer knows what to do. Jack recalls that when he travelled to a different dimension with Tom O'Bedlam, a sentient satellite called Barbelith forced Jack to feel the collective suffering of humanity. Remembering this agony and realizing that he can put an end to it, Jack finally accepts his role and agrees to help save his friends. The next arc focuses on the regrouped Invisibles as they attempt to rescue King Mob and Lord Fanny. During the Invisibles' battle with the Outer Church, Jack is told that he will be responsible for destroying the world on 22 December 2012. Jack fully realizes the power at his disposal, defeating an extra-dimensional Archon of the Outer Church and healing King Mob of his injuries. Jack also heals Sir Miles, who had been severely hurt during the battle. The volume closes with a look at an Invisible named Mr. Six as he searches for traces of the Moonchild.

=== Volume 2 ===
==== Bloody Hell in America ====
The second volume begins a year after the events in London. The arc "Black Science" follows the Invisibles embarking on a mission after taking a year off in America at the New York City estate of wealthy Invisible Mason Lang. While Jack Frost, Boy, and Lord Fanny explore New York City, King Mob and Ragged Robin begin a sexual relationship. Jolly Roger, an Invisible and an old friend of King Mob's, asks them to help her steal an AIDS vaccine from Dulce Base. There, the Invisibles face off against Mr. Quimper and Colonel Friday, two psychic agents of the Outer Church. The Invisibles are victorious, though Quimper plants a tiny part of his psyche in Ragged Robin's subconscious.

==== Counting to None ====
The Invisibles travel to San Francisco where they meet Takashi, an employee of Mason Lang's who is working on a time machine. Ragged Robin reveals that she has been sent from the future using a working version of Takashi's time machine when King Mob takes her to the dimension that the Invisible College, the Invisibles' headquarters, inhabits. Meanwhile, Jack Frost and Lord Fanny obtain a powerful supernatural device called the "Hand of Glory" from a mysterious trio called the "Harlequinade". In an arc titled "Sensitive Criminal", King Mob travels back in time via astral projection to learn from past Invisibles how to operate the Hand of Glory. In the following arc, "American Death Camp", Boy steals the Hand of Glory and attempts to use it to rescue her brother, whom she believes is being held in a secret detention camp in Washington State, US. In reality, Boy is actually being deprogrammed by a separate cell of Invisibles who discovered that she had been brainwashed by the Outer Church to deliver the Hand to them.

==== Kissing Mister Quimper ====
The team vacation in New Orleans. Boy and Jack Frost acknowledge their feelings for each other and begin a brief relationship. The Invisibles then go back to Dulce to steal a powerful substance called "Magic Mirror" from the Outer Church in an arc titled "Black Science 2". Aware of Quimper's presence within her consciousness, Ragged Robin is able to trap and defeat him with Lord Fanny's help. In the Dulce facility, Jack is taken into the Magic Mirror substance where he is shown the horrific dimension that the Outer Church hails from. After leaving Dulce, Ragged Robin prepares to return to the future. Using the Hand of Glory as an engine, Takashi's time machine can be used to return her to her own time. After saying goodbye to King Mob, with whom she has fallen in love, Robin leaves the past behind. In the final issue of the volume, Boy leaves the Invisibles and King Mob destroys Mason Lang's mansion, telling him that it is possible for even the most rigid man to change.

=== Volume 3 ===
==== The Invisible Kingdom ====
Picking up a year after the previous volume, the third and final volume of the series follows the Invisibles as they prepare to stop the Moonchild from being used as a host for Rex Mundi, the extra-dimensional ruler of the Outer Church. Many of the Invisibles have significantly changed in this volume. King Mob no longer uses guns or kills people and Jack Frost has fully accepted his role as humanity's saviour. Also, The Invisibles no longer consider themselves at war with the Outer Church, this time they are on a mission to rescue humanity before the world ends. The arc "The Invisible Kingdom" portrays the final battle between the Invisibles and the Outer Church. Sir Miles is killed, as is Jolly Roger (her body is later seen in a mass grave), while Jack Frost single-handedly defeats Rex Mundi. He then travels once again into the Magic Mirror and learns that the dimensions that the Outer Church and the Invisible College inhabit are one and the same. Afterwards, King Mob retires and devotes the rest of his life to non-violence. Jack Frost and Lord Fanny are left to start their own Invisibles cell. Years later, on 21 December 2012, the world is about to end, just as predicted. Ragged Robin returns and is finally reunited with King Mob. Jack Frost then breaks the fourth wall and addresses the reader, stating that, "OUR SENTENCE IS UP". At that moment, the world ends and humanity transforms into its next stage of existence, guided by Jack Frost.

Volume three does not read from issue 1 to 12 but rather counts down from 12 to 1.

== Creators ==
While Grant Morrison wrote the entire series, The Invisibles never had a regular art team. It was intended that each story arc would be illustrated by a separate artist. The artists to work on each issue are:

- Volume 1
  - Issues #1–4, 22–24: Steve Yeowell
  - Issues #5–9, 13–15: Jill Thompson
  - Issue #10: Chris Weston
  - Issue #11: John Ridgway
  - Issue #12: Steve Parkhouse
  - Issue #16, 21: Paul Johnson
  - Issues #17–19: Phil Jimenez
  - Issue #20: Tommy Lee Edwards
  - Issue #25: Mark Buckingham
- Volume 2
  - Issues #1–13: Phil Jimenez (issue #9 has Jimenez on layouts only, with the pencils handled by Chris Weston, credited as "Space Boy")
  - Issues #14–17, 19–22: Chris Weston
  - Issue #18: Ivan Reis
- Volume 3 (issued in reverse order)
  - Issues #12–9: Philip Bond, Warren Pleece
  - Issues #8–5: Sean Phillips
  - Issue #4: Steve Yeowell, Ashley Wood, Steve Parkhouse, Philip Bond, Jill Thompson, John Ridgway
  - Issue #3: Steve Yeowell, Rian Hughes, John Ridgway, Michael Lark, Jill Thompson, Chris Weston
  - Issue #2: Steve Yeowell, The Pander Brothers, John Ridgway, Cameron Stewart, Ashley Wood, Mark Buckingham, Dean Ormston, Grant Morrison
  - Issue #1: Frank Quitely

Issues #4–2 included artistic collaborators who did not illustrate Morrison's scripts precisely as written. The most notable examples were the three pages Ashley Wood drew in Vol. 3, #2 that were later redrawn by Cameron Stewart for The Invisible Kingdom trade paperback.

== Reception ==
The Invisibles made Rolling Stone magazine's list of "The 50 Best Non-Superhero Graphic Novels", citing its influence on later comic book writers Jonathan Hickman and Gerard Way.

== Collected editions ==
The Invisibles has been collected into seven trade paperbacks:

- Say You Want a Revolution, published 1999-06-01. Collects Volume 1, issues #1–8 (ISBN 1-56389-267-7)
- Apocalipstick, published 2001-04-01. Collects Volume 1, issues #9–16 (ISBN 1-56389-702-4)
- Entropy in the UK, published 2001-08-01. Collects Volume 1, issues #17–25 (ISBN 1-56389-728-8)
- Bloody Hell in America, published 1998-02-01. Collects Volume 2, issues #1–4 (ISBN 1-56389-444-0)
- Counting to None, published 1999-03-01. Collects Volume 2, issues #5–13 (ISBN 1-56389-489-0)
- Kissing Mister Quimper, published 2000-02-01. Collects Volume 2, issues #14–22 (ISBN 1-56389-600-1)
- The Invisible Kingdom, published 2002-12-01. Collects Volume 3, issues #12–1 (ISBN 1-4012-0019-2)

In August 2012, Vertigo published a one-volume, 1500-page omnibus edition of The Invisibles:

- The Invisibles Omnibus, published 2012-08-28. Collects Volume 1, issues #1–25, Volume 2, issues #1–22, and Volume 3, issues #12–1 ISBN 1-4012-3459-3

Starting in February 2014, Vertigo began publishing a new line of hardcover collections:

- The Invisibles: Deluxe Edition, Book One, published 2014-02-18. Collects Volume 1, issues #1–12 plus the story "King Mob in Hexy" from Absolute Vertigo ISBN 1-4012-4502-1
- The Invisibles: Deluxe Edition, Book Two, published 2014-08-19. Collects Volume 1, issues #13–25 plus the story "And We're All Police Men" from Vertigo: Winter's Edge #1 ISBN 1-4012-4599-4
- The Invisibles: Deluxe Edition, Book Three, published 2015-02-10. Collects Volume 2, issues #1–13 ISBN 1-4012-4951-5
- The Invisibles: Deluxe Edition, Book Four, published 2015-06-21. Collects Volume 2, issues #14–22 and Volume 3, issues #12–1 ISBN 1-4012-5421-7

== See also ==
- List of The Invisibles characters
