= Arthur C. Clarke bibliography =

The following is a list of works by Arthur C. Clarke.

== Series ==
=== Space Odyssey ===
- 2001: A Space Odyssey (1968)
- 2010: Odyssey Two (1982) (Hugo and Locus Awards nominee, 1983)
- 2061: Odyssey Three (1987)
- 3001: The Final Odyssey (1997)

=== Rama ===
- Rendezvous with Rama (Hugo and Nebula Award) (1973) (BSFA and Nebula Awards winner, 1973; Hugo, Campbell, and Locus Awards winner, 1974)
- Rama II (1989) (with Gentry Lee)
- The Garden of Rama (1991) (with Gentry Lee)
- Rama Revealed (1993) (with Gentry Lee)

=== A Time Odyssey ===
- Time's Eye (2003) (with Stephen Baxter)
- Sunstorm (2005) (with Stephen Baxter)
- Firstborn (2007) (with Stephen Baxter)

== Fiction ==
=== Novels ===
- Against the Fall of Night (1948, 1953) original version of The City and the Stars
- Prelude to Space (1951) Reprinted in 1961 as Master of Space and as The Space Dreamers in 1969.
- The Sands of Mars (1951)
- Islands in the Sky (1952)
- Childhood's End (1953)
- Earthlight (1955)
- The City and the Stars (1956)
- The Deep Range (1957)
- A Fall of Moondust (1961) (Hugo nominee, 1963)
- Dolphin Island (1963)
- Glide Path (1963)
- Imperial Earth (1975)
- The Fountains of Paradise (Hugo and Nebula Award) (1979) (Hugo Award winner, BSFA nominee, 1979; and Nebula Award winner, Locus Award nominee, 1980)
- The Songs of Distant Earth (1986)
- Cradle (1988) (with Gentry Lee)
- Beyond the Fall of Night (1990) First part a reprint of Against the Fall of Night, second part a sequel by Gregory Benford
- The Ghost from the Grand Banks (1990)
- The Hammer of God (1993)
- Richter 10 (1996) (with Mike McQuay)
- The Trigger (1999) (with Michael P. Kube-McDowell)
- The Light of Other Days (2000) (with Stephen Baxter)
- The Last Theorem (2008) (with Frederik Pohl)

=== Short story collections ===
- Expedition to Earth (1953)
- Reach for Tomorrow (1956)
- Venture to the Moon (1956; six individual connected short stories)
- Tales from the White Hart (1957)
- The Other Side of the Sky (1957/8)
- Tales of Ten Worlds (1962)
- The Nine Billion Names of God (1967)
- Of Time and Stars (1972)
- The Wind from the Sun (1972)
- The Best of Arthur C. Clarke 1937 – 1971 (1973)
- The Best of Arthur C. Clarke 1937 – 1955 (1976)
- The Best of Arthur C. Clarke 1956 – 1972 (1977)
- The Sentinel (1983)
- Tales From Planet Earth (1990)
- More Than One Universe (1991)
- The Collected Stories of Arthur C. Clarke (2001)

=== Novellas, novelettes and short stories ===
- "Travel by Wire!" (1937)
- "How We Went to Mars" (1938)
- "Retreat from Earth" (1938)
- "At the Mountains of Murkiness" (1940)
- "The Awakening" (1942, revised edition published in 1952)
- "Whacky" (1942)
- "The Lion of Comarre" (novella; 1945)
- "Loophole" (1946)
- "Rescue Party" (1946)
- "Technical Error" (a.k.a. "The Reversed Man") (1946)
- "Castaway" (1947)
- "Inheritance" (1947)
- "Nightfall" (a.k.a. "The Curse") (1947)
- "Breaking Strain" (a.k.a. "Thirty Seconds – Thirty Days") (1949)
- "The Fires Within" (1949)
- "The Forgotten Enemy" (1949)
- "Hide-and-Seek" (1949)
- "History Lesson" (a.k.a. "Expedition to Earth") (1949)
- "Transience" (1949)
- "The Wall of Darkness" (1949)
- "Guardian Angel" (1950)
- "Nemesis" (a.k.a. "Exile of the Eons") (1950)
- "The Road to the Sea" (a.k.a. "Seeker of the Sphinx") (1950)
- "Time's Arrow" (1950)
- "A Walk in the Dark" (1950)
- "All the Time in the World" (1951)
- "Earthlight" (1951, extended into the novel Earthlight in 1955)
- "Holiday on the Moon" (1951)
- "If I Forget Thee, Oh Earth" (1951)
- "Second Dawn" (1951)
- "The Sentinel" (1951)
- "Superiority" (1951)

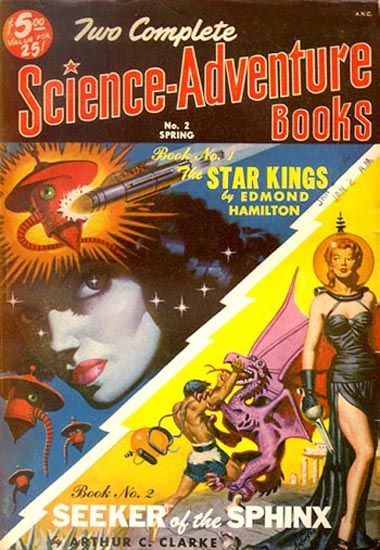
Clarke's novella "The Road to the Sea" was originally published in Two Complete Science-Adventure Books in 1951 as "Seeker of the Sphinx"

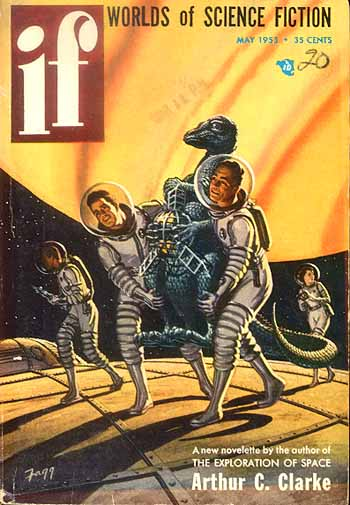
Clarke's novelette "Jupiter Five" was cover-featured on the May 1953 issue of If

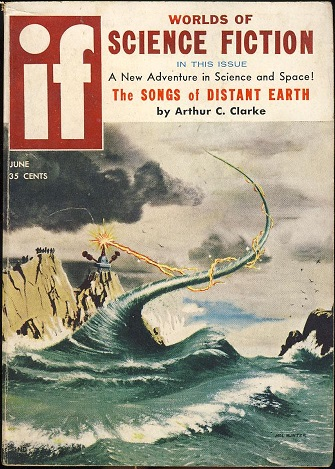
The original novelette version of "The Songs of Distant Earth" was the cover story for the June 1958 issue of If

- "Trouble with the Natives" (1951)
- "Encounter in the Dawn" (a.k.a. "Encounter at Dawn") (1953)
- "Jupiter Five" (a.k.a. "Jupiter V") (1953)
- "The Nine Billion Names of God" (1953)
- "The Other Tiger" (1953)
- "The Parasite" (1953)
- "The Possessed" (1953)
- "Publicity Campaign" (1953)
- "Reverie" (1953)
- "Armaments Race" (1954)
- "The Deep Range" (1954, extended into the novel The Deep Range in 1957)
- "The Man Who Ploughed the Sea" (1954)
- "No Morning After" (1954)
- "Patent Pending" (1954)
- "Silence Please" (a.k.a. "Silence Please!") (1950)
- "Refugee" (a.k.a. "?", a.k.a. "Royal Prerogative", a.k.a. "This Earth of Majesty") (1954)
- "The Star" (1955)
- "What Goes Up" (a.k.a. "What Goes Up...") (1955)
- "All that Glitters" (1956 under the title "IV: All That Glitters", 1957 as "All That Glitters")
- "Big Game Hunt" (a.k.a. "The Reckless Ones") (1956)
- "Green Fingers"(1956)
- "The Pacifist" (1956)
- "A Question of Residence" (1956)
- "The Reluctant Orchid" (1956)
- "Robin Hood, F.R.S." (1956)
- "The Starting Line" (1956)
- Venture to the Moon (1956; six individual connected short stories)
- "Watch this Space" (1956 under the titles "V: Watch this Space" and "Who Wrote That Message to the Stars? ...in Letters a Thousand Miles Long?", 1957 as "Watch This Space")
- "The Call of the Stars" (1957)
- "Cold War (short story)" (1957)
- "Critical Mass" (1950)
- "The Defenestration of Ermintrude Inch" (1957)
- "Let There Be Light" (1957)
- "Freedom of Space" (1957)
- "Moving Spirit" (1957)
- "The Next Tenants" (1957)
- The Other Side of the Sky (1957; six individual connected stories)
- "Passer-by" (1957)
- "Security Check" (1957)
- "Sleeping Beauty" (1957)
- "The Songs of Distant Earth" (short story, 1957)
- "Special Delivery" (1957)
- "Feathered Friend" (1957)
- "Take a Deep Breath" (1957)
- "The Ultimate Melody" (1957)
- "Cosmic Casanova" (1958)
- "A Slight Case of Sunstroke" (a.k.a. "The Stroke of the Sun") (1958)
- "Out of the Sun" (1958)
- "Who's There?" (a.k.a. "The Haunted Spacesuit") (1958)
- "Out of the Cradle, Endlessly Orbiting..." (a.k.a. "Out of the Cradle") (1959)
- "Into the Comet" (a.k.a. Inside the Comet) (1960)
- "I Remember Babylon" (1960)
- "Summertime on Icarus" (a.k.a. "The Hottest Piece of Real Estate in the Solar System") (1960)
- "Trouble with Time" (a.k.a. "Crime on Mars") (1960)
- "Before Eden" (1961)
- "Death and the Senator (1961)
- "The Food of the Gods" (1961)
- "Hate" (a.k.a. "At the End of the Orbit") (1961)
- "Love that Universe" (1961)
- "Saturn Rising" (1961)
- "An Ape About the House" (1962)
- "Dog Star" (a.k.a. "Moon Dog") (1962)
- "Maelstrom II" (1962)
- "The Shining Ones" (1962)
- "The Last Command" (1963)
- "Playback" (1963)
- "The Secret" (a.k.a. "The Secret of the Men in the Moon") (1963)
- "The Light of Darkness" (1964)
- "The Wind from the Sun" (a.k.a. "Sunjammer") (1964)
- "Dial F for Frankenstein" (1965)
- "The Longest Science-Fiction Story Ever Told" (a.k.a. "A Recursion in Metastories") (1966)
- "The Cruel Sky" (1966)
- "Crusade" (1966)
- "Herbert George Morley Roberts Wells, Esq." (1967)
- "Neutron Tide" (1970)
- "Transit of Earth" (1971)
- "A Meeting with Medusa" (Nebula Award for best novella) (1971)
- "Reunion" (1971)
- "When the Twerms Came" (1972)
- "Quarantine" (1977)
- "siseneG" (1984)
- "On Golden Seas" (1986)
- "The Steam-Powered Word Processor" (1986)
- "The Hammer of God" (1992)
- "The Wire Continuum" (with Stephen Baxter) (1997)
- "Improving the Neighbourhood" (1999)

=== Omnibus editions ===
- Across the Sea of Stars (1959) (including Childhood's End, Earthlight and 18 short stories. Introduction by Clifton Fadiman.)
- From the Ocean, From the Stars (1962) (including The City and the Stars, The Deep Range and The Other Side of the Sky)
- An Arthur C. Clarke Omnibus (1965) (including Childhood's End, Prelude to Space and Expedition to Earth)
- Prelude to Mars (1965) (including Prelude to Space, The Sands of Mars and 16 short stories)
- The Lion of Comarre and Against the Fall of Night (1968)
- An Arthur C. Clarke Second Omnibus (1968) (including A Fall of Moondust, Earthlight and The Sands of Mars)
- Four Great SF Novels (1978) (including The City and the Stars, The Deep Range, A Fall of Moondust, Rendezvous with Rama)
- 2001: A Space Odyssey, The City and the Stars, The Deep Range, A Fall of Moondust, Rendezvous with Rama (1985)
- A Meeting with Medusa and Green Mars (the 1985 novella not the 1993 novel) by Kim Stanley Robinson (1988)
- The Space Trilogy (2001) (including Islands in the Sky, The Sands of Mars and Earthlight)
- The City and the Stars and The Sands of Mars (2001)
- The Ghost from the Grand Banks and The Deep Range (2001)
- 3001 The Final Odyssey, The Songs of Distant Earth (2004)
- Clarke's Universe (2005) (including A Fall of Moondust, The Lion of Comarre and Jupiter V)

== Non-fiction ==
=== Books ===
1. Interplanetary Flight: An Introduction to Astronautics. London: Temple Press, 1950
2. The Exploration of Space. London: Temple Press, New York: Harper Bros., 1951. Updated/revised 1959 and 1979 (with a new introduction).
3. The Exploration of the Moon, Illustrated by R.A. Smith. 1954
4. The Young Traveller in Space. London: Phoenix House, 1954. Variously titled Going into Space. New York: Harper and Row, 1954, The Scottie Book of Space Travel. London: Transworld Publishers, 1957
5. The Coast of Coral. Photos by Mike Wilson. Text by Arthur C. Clarke. Frederick Muller, 1956 — Volume 1 of the Blue Planet Trilogy
6. The Reefs of Taprobane; Underwater Adventures around Ceylon, Photos by Mike Wilson. Text by Arthur C. Clarke. New York: Harper, 1957 — Volume 2 of the Blue Planet Trilogy
7. The Making of a Moon: The Story of the Earth Satellite Program. New York: Harper, 1957
8. Boy Beneath the Sea, Photos by Mike Wilson. Text by Arthur C. Clarke. New York: Harper, 1958
9. Voice Across the Sea. HarperCollins, 1958
10. The Challenge of the Space Ship: Previews of Tomorrow’s World. New York: Harper, 1959
11. The Challenge of the Sea. New York: Holt, Rinehart and Winston, 1960
12. The First Five Fathoms, Photos by Mike Wilson. Text by Arthur C. Clarke. New York: Harper, 1960
13. Indian Ocean Adventure, Photos by Mike Wilson. Text by Arthur C. Clarke. New York: Harper, 1961
14. Profiles of the Future; an Inquiry into the Limits of the Possible. London: Gollancz, 1962. Updated editions of this book were printed in 1973, 1984 and in 1999 as the "Millennium Edition".
15. Man and Space. 1964. Created with the editors of Life.
16. Indian Ocean Treasure, Photos by Mike Wilson. Text by Arthur C. Clarke. New York: Harper, 1964
17. The Treasure of the Great Reef, Photos by Mike Wilson. Text by Arthur C. Clarke. New York: Harper & Row, 1964 — Volume 3 of the Blue Planet Trilogy
18. Voices from the Sky: Previews of the Coming Space Age. New York: Harper & Row, 1965
19. The Promise of Space. New York: Harper, 1968
20. Into Space: a Young Person’s Guide to Space, by Arthur C. Clarke and Robert Silverberg. New York: Harper & Row, 1971
21. Beyond Jupiter: The Worlds of Tomorrow, by Arthur C. Clarke (text) and Chesley Bonestell (paintings). Little & Brown, 1972
22. Report on Planet Three and Other Speculations. New York: Harper & Row, 1972
23. The Lost Worlds of 2001. London: Sidgwick and Jackson, 1972
24. The View from Serendip. Random House, 1977
25. The Odyssey File. Email correspondence with Peter Hyams. London: Panther Books, 1984
26. 1984, Spring: a Choice of Futures. New York: Ballantine Books, 1984
27. Ascent to Orbit, a Scientific Autobiography: The Technical Writings of Arthur C. Clarke. New York: John Wiley & Sons, 1984
28. 20 July 2019: Life in the 21st Century. Macmillan Publishing Company, 1986
29. Astounding Days: A Science Fictional Autobiography. London: Gollancz, 1989
30. How the World Was One: Beyond the Global Village (a.k.a. How the World Was One: Towards the Tele-Family of Man). London : Gollanncz, 1992 — A history and survey of the communications revolution
31. By Space Possessed. London: Gollancz, 1993
32. The Snows of Olympus – A Garden on Mars London: Gollancz 1994, picture album with comments
33. Childhood Ends: The Earliest Writings of Arthur C. Clarke. Rochester: Portentous Press, 1996
34. Greetings, Carbon-Based Bipeds! : Collected Works 1934–1988. London: HarperCollins, 1999

=== Magazine Articles ===
1. Extra-Terrestrial Relays in Wireless World, October 1945.

=== Contributions, Introductions, Forewords, Prefaces & Misc. ===
1. From the Earth to the Moon; Jules Verne, 1962. Wrote Introduction to the 1962 edition of this 1865 novel.
2. Time Probe: The Sciences in Science Fiction; 1966. Wrote Introduction and one story, collected the other ten stories.
3. The Coming of the Space Age; Famous Accounts of Man's Probing of the Universe; 1967. Selected and edited by Arthur C. Clarke.
4. The Beginnings of Satellite Communication; J.R. Pierce, 1968. Wrote Preface.
5. Three for Tomorrow; Robert Silverberg, Roger Zelazny and James Blish, 1969. Wrote Foreword.
6. First on the Moon; Neil Armstrong with Gene Farmer and Dora Jane Hamblin, 1970. Wrote Epilogue.
7. The Panic Broadcast; Howard Koch, 1970. Introductory interview with Arthur C. Clarke.
8. The Challenge of the Stars (a.k.a. The New Challenge of the Stars); 1972. Wrote Foreword.
9. The World in Focus; William MacQuitty, 1974. Wrote Foreword.
10. The Complete Venus Equilateral; George O. Smith, 1976. Wrote Introduction.
11. The Telephone's First Century—and Beyond: Essays on the Occasion of the 100th Anniversary of Telephone Communication; 1974. Wrote Essay.
12. The World in Color Photography; 1979. Wrote Foreword.
13. Arthur C. Clarke's Mysterious World; Simon Welfare and John Fairly, 1980. Wrote chapter introductions.
14. The Illustrated Encyclopedia of Space Technology; 1981. Wrote Foreword.
15. The Science Fiction Hall of Fame Volume Three: The Nebula Winners 1965–1969; 1982. Editor along with George Proctor.
16. Arthur C. Clarke's World of Strange Powers; Simon Welfare and John Fairly, 1984. Wrote chapter introductions.
17. Sightseeing: A Space Panorama; Barbara Hitchcock, 1985. Wrote Foreword.
18. Arthur C. Clarke's Chronicles of the Strange and Mysterious; Simon Welfare and John Fairly, 1987. Wrote chapter introductions.
19. Arthur C. Clarke's Venus Prime Vol. 1: Breaking Strain; Paul Preuss, 1987. Wrote Afterword; novel is based on Clarke's short story Breaking Strain.
20. Arthur C. Clarke's Venus Prime Vol. 2: Maelstrom;Paul Preuss, 1988. Wrote Afterword; novel is based on Clarke's short story Maelstrom II.
21. Arthur C. Clarke's Venus Prime Vol. 3: Hide and Seek; Paul Preuss, 1989. Wrote Afterword; novel is based on Clarke's short story Hide-and-Seek.
22. Visions of Space; 1989. Wrote Foreword.
23. Arthur C. Clarke's Venus Prime Vol. 4: The Medusa Encounter; Paul Preuss, 1990. Wrote Afterword; novel is based on Clarke's short story A Meeting with Medusa.
24. Arthur C. Clarke's Venus Prime Vol. 5: The Diamond Moon; Paul Preuss, 1990. Wrote Afterword; novel is based on Clarke's short story Jupiter Five.
25. Project Solar Sail; 1990. Editor.
26. Arthur C. Clarke's Venus Prime Vol. 6: The Shining Ones; Paul Preuss, 1991. Wrote Afterword; novel is based on Clarke's short story The Shining Ones.
27. Blueprint for Space: Science Fiction to Science Fact; Frederick I. Ordway III (editor), 1991. Wrote Epilogue.
28. Sri Lanka; Tom Tidball, 1991. Wrote Foreword.
29. Space Commerce; John L. McLucas, 1991. Wrote Foreword.
30. The Profession of Science Fiction: SF Writers on Their Craft and Ideas; Maxim Jakubowski (editor), 1992. Wrote Foreword.
31. Technology 2001: The Future of Computing and Communications; Derek Leebaert (editor), 1992. Wrote Foreword.
32. Arthur C. Clarke's A–Z of Mysteries; Simon Welfare and John Fairly, 1993. Wrote foreword.
33. The Anti-Gravity Handbook (New and Expanded Edition); D. Hatcher Childress (compiler), 1993. Wrote Chapter 1, titled "Arthur C. Clarke on Anti-Gravity".
34. The Dream Machines: An Illustrated History of the Spaceship in Art, Science and Literature; Ron Miller and Rick Dunning, 1993. Wrote Foreword.
35. The First Men in the Moon; H.G. Wells, 1993. Wrote Introduction to the 1993 edition of this 1901 novel.
36. Unearthing Atlantis: An Archaeological Odyssey to the Fabled Lost Civilization; Charles R. Pellegrino, 1993. Wrote Foreword.
37. Seize the Moment: The Autobiography of Britain's First Astronaut; Helen Sharman, 1993. Wrote Introduction.
38. The War of the Worlds; H.G. Wells, 1993. Wrote Introduction to the 1993 edition of this 1898 novel.
39. Gene Roddenberry: The Last Conversation; Yvonne Fern, 1994. Wrote Foreword.
40. The Millennial Project: Colonizing the Galaxy in Eight Easy Steps; Marshall T. Savage, 1994. Wrote Introduction.
41. Only Visiting This Planet: The Art of Danny Flynn; Nigel Suckling, 1994. Wrote Introduction.
42. The Ultimate Egoist; Theodore Sturgeon, 1994. Wrote Foreword.
43. 2001: Filming the Future; Piers Bizony, 1995. Wrote Foreword.
44. Aliya: Stories of the Elephants of Sri Lanka; Teresa Cannon and Peter Davis, 1995. Wrote Foreword.
45. Bright Messengers; Gentry Lee, 1995. Wrote Introduction to this novel set in the Rama universe.
46. An Encyclopedia of Claims, Frauds, and Hoaxes of the Occult and Supernatural (a.k.a. The Supernatural A-Z: The Truth and the Lies); James Randi, 1995, St. Martin's Press ISBN 0-312-15119-5 (Online Version). Wrote Introduction.
47. Frontline of Discovery: Science on the Brink of Tomorrow; National Geographic Society, 1995. Wrote Epilogue.
48. Rogue Asteroids and Doomsday Comets:The Search for the Million Megaton Menace That Threatens Life on Earth; Duncan Steel, 1995. Wrote Foreword.
49. The Dechronization of Sam Magruder; George Gaylord Simpson, 1996. Wrote Introduction.
50. Encounter with Tiber; Buzz Aldrin and John Barnes, 1996. Wrote Foreword.
51. Survival Kit: How to Reach Ninety and Make the Most of It; William MacQuitty, 1996. Wrote Preface.
52. The Case for Mars: The Plan to Settle the Red Planet and Why We Must; Robert Zubrin and Richard Wagner, 1997. Wrote Foreword.
53. The Roving Mind: New Edition, Isaac Asimov, 1997. Wrote Tribute.
54. Arthur C. Clarke & Lord Dunsany: A Correspondence. ed. Keith Allen Daniels. Palo Alto, CA, USA: Anamnesis Press, 1998. Letters reprinted.
55. Hal's Legacy : 2001's Computer As Dream and Reality; David G. Stork, 1998. Wrote Foreword.
56. Intelligent Software Agents; Richard Murch, Tony Johnson, 1998. Wrote Foreword.
57. Arthur C. Clarke's Mysteries; Simon Welfare and John Fairly, 1998. Wrote foreword.
58. Welcome to the Wired World: The New Networked Economy; Anne C. Leer, 1999. Wrote Preface.
59. Arthur C. Clarke's Mysteries; John Fairly and Simon Welfare, 2000. Wrote Foreword.
60. e-Sphere: The Rise of the World-Wide Mind; Joseph N. Pelton, 2000. Wrote Foreword.
61. Excess Heat: Why Cold Fusion Research Prevailed; Charles G. Beaudette, 2000. Wrote Foreword.
62. Sri Lanka, the Emerald Island; Tissa Devendra, 2000. Wrote Foreword.
63. The Art of Chesley Bonestell; Ron Miller, 2001. Wrote Foreword.
64. Literary Trips 2: Following in the Footsteps of Fame; Victoria Brooks (editor), 2001. Wrote Foreword and is profiled in chapter 1.
65. Macroshift: Navigating the Transformation to a Sustainable World; Ervin Laszlo, 2001. Wrote Foreword.
66. The Search for Free Energy (a.k.a. The Scientist, the Madman, the Thief and Their Lightbulb); Keith Tutt, 2001. Wrote Foreword.
67. Visions of Spaceflight: Images from the Ordway Collection; Frederick I. Ordway III, 2001. Wrote Introduction, technical advisor.
68. The Web Between the Worlds; Charles Sheffield, 2001. Wrote Introduction to the 2001 edition of this 1979 novel.
69. The Worlds of Galileo; Michael E. Hanlon, 2001. Wrote Foreword.
70. Business 2010: Mapping the New Commercial Landscape; Ian Pearson, Michael Lyons, 2002. Wrote Foreword.
71. The Conquest of Space; David Lasser, 2002. Wrote Introduction to the 2002 edition of this 1931 work of non-fiction.
72. Creating Space: The Story of the Space Age through the Models; Mat Irvine, 2002. Wrote Introduction.
73. Moonwatcher's Memoir: A Diary of 2001: A Space Odyssey; Dan Richter, 2002. Wrote Foreword.
74. From Narnia to A Space Odyssey: The War of Ideas Between Arthur C. Clarke and C. S. Lewis. Edited with an Introduction by Ryder W. Miller. Ibooks (distr. by Simon & Schuster), 2003. Letters, essays and short stories reprinted. Republished in 2005 with new sub-title "Stories, letters, and commentary by and about C. S. Lewis and Arthur C. Clarke".
75. To the Edge of Doom; Tyronne Fernando, 2003. Wrote Introduction.
76. The Colours of Infinity: The Beauty, The Power and the Sense of Fractals; Clear Books, 2004. Contributor. Reprinted in 2010 as The Colours of Infinity: The Beauty and Power of Fractals
77. Are We Alone?: The Stanley Kubrick Extraterrestrial Intelligence Interviews; Anthony Frewin (editor), 2005. Wrote Preface.
78. Freedom on the March: An American Voyage to Explore Globalization; Patrick Mendis, 2005. Wrote Introduction.
79. 'S' Is for Space; Ray Bradbury, 2005. Wrote Introduction.
80. Science Fiction Quotations: From the Inner Mind to the Outer Limits; Dr. Gary Westfahl (editor), 2005. Wrote Foreword.
81. Beautiful Living: Buddha's Way to Prosperity, Wisdom, and Inner Peace (a.k.a. The Buddha's Teachings on Prosperity: At Home, At Work, In the World); Bhikkhu Rahula, 2006. Wrote Foreword.
82. Jules Verne: The Definitive Biography; William Butcher, 2006. Wrote Introduction.
83. The World of Jules Verne; Gonzague Saint Bris, 2006. Wrote Preface.
84. The Rise of Animals: Evolution and Diversification of the Kingdom Animalia; Mikhail A. Fedonkin, James G. Gehling, Kathleen Grey, Guy M. Narbonne and Patricia Vickers-Rich, 2008. Wrote Foreword.
85. SpaceShipOne: An Illustrated History; Dan Linehan, 2008. Wrote Foreword.
86. From the Pen of Paul: The Fantastic Images of Frank R. Paul; Stephen D. Korshak (editor), 2009. Wrote Preface.
87. The Story of Astronomy; Heather Couper and Nigel Henbest, 2012. Wrote Foreword.
