= The Collected Stories of Arthur C. Clarke =

Book by Arthur C. Clarke

- First UK edition dustjacket
- Author: Arthur C. Clarke
- Cover artist: Blacksheep
- Language: English
- Genre: Science fiction
- Publisher: Gollancz
- Publication date: January 2001
- Publication place: United Kingdom
- Media type: Print (Hardcover)
- Pages: x, 966 pp
- ISBN: 0-575-07065-X
- OCLC: 49338196

The Collected Stories of Arthur C. Clarke, first published in 2001, is a collection of almost all science fiction short stories written by Arthur C. Clarke. It includes 114 stories, arranged in order of publication, from "Travel by Wire!" in 1937 through to "Improving the Neighbourhood" in 1999. The story "Improving The Neighbourhood" has the distinction of being the first fiction published in the journal Nature. The titles "Venture to the Moon" and "The Other Side of the Sky" are not stories, but the titles of groups of six interconnected stories, each story with its own title. This collection is only missing a very few stories, for example "When the Twerms Came", which appears in his other collections More Than One Universe and The View from Serendip. This edition contains a foreword by Clarke written in 2000, where he speculates on the science fiction genre in relation to the concept of short stories. Furthermore, many of the stories have a short introduction about their publication history or literary nature.

In addition to the printed edition, an audio edition was published by Fantastic Audio in 2001. The audio edition, comprising five volumes, runs nearly fifty hours. An electronic edition of the book was published in four volumes by RosettaBooks in 2012.

== Contents ==
- Foreword

1. "Travel by Wire!"
2. "How We Went to Mars"
3. "Retreat from Earth"
4. "Reverie"
5. "The Awakening"
6. "Whacky"
7. "Loophole"
8. "Rescue Party"
9. "Technical Error"
10. "Castaway"
11. "The Fires Within"
12. "Inheritance"
13. "Nightfall"
14. "History Lesson"
15. "Transience"
16. "The Wall of Darkness"
17. "The Lion of Comarre"
18. "The Forgotten Enemy"
19. "Hide-and-Seek"
20. "Breaking Strain"
21. "Nemesis"
22. "Guardian Angel"
23. "Time's Arrow"
24. "A Walk in the Dark"
25. "Silence Please"
26. "Trouble with the Natives"
27. "The Road to the Sea"
28. "The Sentinel"
29. "Holiday on the Moon"
30. "Earthlight"
31. "Second Dawn"
32. "Superiority"
33. "If I Forget Thee, Oh Earth"
34. "All the Time in the World"
35. "The Nine Billion Names of God"
36. "The Possessed"
37. "The Parasite"
38. "Jupiter Five"
39. "Encounter in the Dawn"
40. "The Other Tiger"
41. "Publicity Campaign"
42. "Armaments Race"
43. "The Deep Range"
44. "No Morning After"
45. "Big Game Hunt"
46. "Patent Pending"
47. "Refugee"
48. "The Star"
49. "What Goes Up"
50. "Venture to the Moon" (six individual connected stories)
51. "The Starting Line"
52. "Robin Hood, F.R.S."
53. "Green Fingers"
54. "All That Glitters"
55. "Watch This Space"
56. "A Question of Residence"
57. "The Pacifist"
58. "The Reluctant Orchid"
59. "Moving Spirit"
60. "The Defenestration of Ermintrude Inch"
61. "The Ultimate Melody"
62. "The Next Tenants"
63. "Cold War"
64. "Sleeping Beauty"
65. "Security Check"
66. "The Man Who Ploughed the Sea"
67. "Critical Mass"
68. "The Other Side of the Sky" (six individual connected stories)
69. "Special Delivery"
70. "Feathered Friends"
71. "Take a Deep Breath"
72. "Freedom of Space"
73. "Passer-by"
74. "The Call of the Stars"
75. "Let There Be Light"
76. "Out of the Sun"
77. "Cosmic Casanova"
78. "The Songs of Distant Earth"
79. "A Slight Case of Sunstroke"
80. "Who's There?"
81. "Out of the Cradle, Endlessly Orbiting..."
82. "I Remember Babylon"
83. "Trouble with Time"
84. "Into the Comet"
85. "Summertime on Icarus"
86. "Saturn Rising"
87. "Death and the Senator"
88. "Before Eden"
89. "Hate"
90. "Love That Universe"
91. "Dog Star"
92. "Maelstrom II"
93. "An Ape About the House"
94. "The Shining Ones"
95. "The Secret"
96. "Dial F for Frankenstein"
97. "The Wind from the Sun"
98. "The Food of the Gods"
99. "The Last Command"
100. "Light of Darkness"
101. "The Longest Science-fiction Story Ever Told"
102. "Playback"
103. "The Cruel Sky"
104. "Herbert George Morley Roberts Wells, Esq."
105. "Crusade"
106. "Neutron Tide"
107. "Reunion"
108. "Transit of Earth"
109. "A Meeting with Medusa"
110. "Quarantine"
111. "'siseneG': 'Genesis' Spelled Backwards"
112. "The Steam-powered Word Processor"
113. "On Golden Seas"
114. "The Hammer of God"
115. "The Wire Continuum" (with Stephen Baxter)
116. "Improving the Neighbourhood"

== Previous appearances in book form ==
Of the above 114 pieces, 95 were published in six major short story collections during Clarke's lifetime. They are distributed as follows (all cross-references with the above list are noted):

- "Expedition to Earth" (1953, 11 stories: nos. 7, 12, 14, 19–21, 28, 31, 32–33, 39)
- "Reach for Tomorrow" (1956, 12: nos. 5, 8–9, 11, 13, 18, 23–24, 26, 36–38)
- "Tales from the White Hart" (1957, 15: nos. 25, 42, 45–46, 49, 57–64, 66–67)
- "The Other Side of the Sky" (1958, 24: nos. 15–16, 34–35, 41, 44, 47–48, 51–56, 65, 69–74, 76–78)
- "Tales of Ten Worlds" (1962, 15: nos. 27, 75, 79–89, 91, 93)
- "The Wind from the Sun" (1972, 18: nos. 90, 92, 94–109)

Note that nos. 50 and 68 above are not short stories but two cycles of six pieces each.

Later collections consist mostly of previously collected material, with the following exceptions (all cross-references with the above list are noted):

- The Best of Arthur C. Clarke: 1937–1971 (1973, four "new" stories: nos. 1, 3, 6, 10)
- The Sentinel (1983, 2: no. 22)
- The Wind from the Sun (1987 edition, 3: nos. 110, 111)
- Tales from Planet Earth (1989, 3: nos. 40, 43, 113)

As can be seen, of these 12 "new stories", 10 are reprinted in The Collected Stories. The missing ones are a movie outline of The Songs of Distant Earth (from "The Sentinel"; this is not the short story of the same name) and a short sketch titled "When the Twerms Came", which originally appeared in Clarke's non-fiction book The View from Serendip (1978) and was later reprinted in the 1987 edition of The Wind from the Sun.

For the remaining nine pieces (2, 4, 17, 29, 30, 112, 114–116) this is either their first appearance in book form at all or first appearance in a book by Arthur C. Clarke. There are, however, two exceptions. "The Lion of Comarre" (no. 17), although published in magazine form as early as 1949, first appeared in book form in 1968, in an omnibus edition together with Clarke's early novel Against the Fall of the Night (1953). "The Steam-powered Word-Processor" (no. 112) had previously appeared in Clarke's "science-fictional autobiography" Astounding Days (1989).

== See also ==
- Arthur C. Clarke bibliography
