= Short fiction by Arthur C. Clarke =

Arthur C. Clarke (1917-2008) wrote a considerable number of short stories in the science fiction genre.

== Themes ==
Clarke started his career as a writer by publishing nineteen science fiction stories before the publication of his first novel, Prelude to Space, in 1951. He partially stayed "in science fiction's 'consensus history' of man's expansion into space" (David N. Samuelson), with his stories, under the influence of Astounding Science Fiction editor John W. Campbell, Jr., but also dealt with the far future, in them, and wrote stories "of a more somber, even melancholy tone" (Samuelson). Themes of his stories of this type were a possible dead end of mankind's science and technology, or the confrontation of a naive view of progress with alien civilizations.

Clarke thematizes the dangers that could arise for aliens from a failure to understand men only in "Rescue Party" (1946) and "Loophole" (1946).

== Types ==
=== Humor ===
Eric Rabkin has called some of Clarke's early stories "ghost stories", while David N. Samuelson has characterized them as a kind of jokes "of the 'shaggy dog' variety". Clarke largely adhered to the humorous in the second half of the 1950s. The humorous element remained one of the pillars of his short fiction.

Algis Budrys complained that many short stories by Clarke that were intended to surprise by their endings failed to do so. Some of Clarke's short stories, like "A Walk in the Dark" (1950) or "Who's There?" (1958) are indeed explicitly humorous to such a degree that one can only understand them from a consciously chosen naive point of view. Others of Clarke's short stories derive their humorous impetus from the subject of mutual unawareness ("The Fires Within", 1947) or miscomprehension between species ("The Parasite" and "The Possessed", 1953). Further examples of short stories that were explicitly meant to be humorous are "Patent Pending" (1954), "What Goes Up" (1956), "The Reluctant Orchid" (1956), and "The Ultimate Melody" (1957).

=== Public-relations work ===
In the short story collections Venture to the Moon (1956) and The Other Side of the Sky (1957), Clarke shows a different aspect of space exploration (regarding the special cases of the Moon and of the construction of a space station), in each story, without aiming at a plot that would be interesting for any other reason than the respective outward issue.

== Bibliography ==
=== Collections ===
Clarke's short stories have, in many cases, been published in science fiction magazines. Collections of them have appeared under the titles Expedition to Earth (1954), Reach for Tomorrow (1956), Venture to the Moon (1956; six individual connected short stories) Tales from the White Hart (1957), The Other Side of the Sky (1958; named after the 1957 collection of six individual connected short stories with the same title that it comprises, also comprising Venture to the Moon), Tales of Ten Worlds (1962), The Nine Billion Names of God (1967), Of Time and Stars (1972), The Wind from the Sun (1972), The Best of Arthur C. Clarke (1973), The Sentinel (1983), Tales From Planet Earth (1990), More Than One Universe (1991), and The Collected Stories of Arthur C. Clarke (2001).

=== The single short stories ===
See Arthur C. Clarke bibliography
