= More Than One Universe =

1991 collection of science fiction short stories by Arthur C. Clarke

More Than One Universe: The Collected Stories of Arthur C. Clarke
- Cover of the first edition
- Author: Arthur C. Clarke
- Cover artist: Paul Swendsen
- Language: English
- Genre: Science fiction
- Publisher: Bantam Books
- Publication date: 1991
- Publication place: United States
- Media type: Print (paperback)
- Pages: 554 pp
- ISBN: 0-553-29189-0
- OCLC: 24239885

More Than One Universe: The Collected Stories of Arthur C. Clarke is a collection of science fiction short stories by Arthur C. Clarke originally published in 1991.

The stories originally appeared in the periodicals Playboy, Vogue, Dude, New Worlds, The Magazine of Fantasy & Science Fiction, Dundee Sunday Telegraph, Analog, Amazing Stories, Galaxy Science Fiction, Infinity Science Fiction, London Evening News, Startling Stories, Venture Science Fiction Magazine, If, Boys' Life, This Week, Bizarre! Mystery Magazine, Escapade, Asimov's Science Fiction, Astounding, King's College Review, Dynamic Science Fiction, Thrilling Wonder Stories, Satellite, Argosy and Ten Story Fantasy as well as the anthologies Star Science Fiction Stories No.1 edited by Frederik Pohl, Time to Come edited by August Derleth, Infinity #2 edited by Robert Hoskins, The Farthest Reaches, edited by Joseph Elder, and The Wind From the Sun.

== Contents ==
Contents of More Than One Universe include:

- "I Remember Babylon"
- "Summertime on Icarus"
- "Out of the Cradle, Endlessly Orbiting..."
- "Who's There?"
- "Hate"
- "Into the Comet"
- "An Ape about the House"
- "Let There be Light"
- "Death and the Senator"
- "Trouble with Time"
- "Before Eden"
- "A Slight Case of Sunstroke"
- "Dog Star"
- "The Nine Billion Names of God"
- "Refugee"
- The Other Side of the Sky
  - "Special Delivery"
  - "Feathered Friends"
  - "Take a Deep Breath"
  - "Freedom of Space"
  - "Passer-by"
  - "The Call of the Stars"
- "Security Check"
- "No Morning After"
- Venture to the Moon
  - "The Starting Line"
  - "Robin Hood, F.R.S."
  - "Green Fingers"
  - "All That Glitters"
  - "Watch This Space"
  - "A Question of Residence"
- "All the Time in the World"
- "Cosmic Casanova"
- "The Star"
- "Out of the Sun"
- "Transience"
- "The Songs of Distant Earth"
- "The Food of the Gods"
- "Maelstrom II"
- "The Shining Ones"
- "The Wind from the Sun"
- "The Secret"
- "The Last Command"
- "Dial F for Frankenstein"
- "Reunion"
- "Playback"
- "The Light of Darkness"
- "The Longest Science-Fiction Story Ever Told"
- "Herbert George Morley Roberts Wells, Esq."
- "Love That Universe"
- "Crusade"
- "The Neutron Tide"
- "Transit of Earth"
- "A Meeting with Medusa"
- "When the Twerms Came"
- "Quarantine"
- "siseneG"
- "Rescue Party"
- "The Curse"
- "Hide and Seek"
- "The Possessed"
- "Superiority"
- "A Walk in the Dark"
- "The Reluctant Orchid"
- "Encounter at Dawn"
- "Patent Pending"
- "The Sentinel"
