= The Nine Billion Names of God (collection) =

1967 collection of short stories by Arthur C. Clarke

- Cover of the first edition
- Author: Arthur C. Clarke
- Language: English
- Genre: Science fiction
- Publisher: Harcourt
- Publication date: 1967
- Publication place: United States
- Media type: Print (hardcover)
- Pages: 288 pp

The Nine Billion Names of God (1967) is a collection of science fiction short stories by Arthur C. Clarke.

According to Clarke's 1972 book The Lost Worlds of 2001, the book comprises his own selection of favorites.

== Contents ==
This collection includes:

- "The Nine Billion Names of God"
- "I Remember Babylon"
- "Trouble with Time"
- "Rescue Party"
- "The Curse"
- "Summertime on Icarus"
- "Dog Star"
- "Hide and Seek"
- "Out of the Sun"
- "The Wall of Darkness"
- "No Morning After"
- "The Possessed"
- "Death and the Senator"
- "Who's There?"
- "Before Eden"
- "Superiority"
- "A Walk in the Dark"
- "The Call of the Stars"
- "The Reluctant Orchid"
- "Encounter at Dawn"
- "If I Forget Thee, Oh Earth..."
- "Patent Pending"
- "The Sentinel"
- "Transience"
- "The Star"

== Sources ==
- Tuck, Donald H. (1974). The Encyclopedia of Science Fiction and Fantasy. Chicago: Advent. p. 102. ISBN 0-911682-20-1.
