= The Best of Arthur C. Clarke =

1973 collection of science fiction short stories by Arthur C. Clarke

The Best of Arthur C. Clarke: 1937-1971
- First edition
- Author: Arthur C. Clarke
- Cover artist: Chris Foss
- Language: English
- Genre: Science fiction
- Publisher: Sidgwick & Jackson
- Publication date: 1973
- Publication place: United Kingdom
- Media type: Print (Hardcover)
- Pages: 336

The Best of Arthur C. Clarke: 1937-1971 is a collection of science fiction short stories by British writer Arthur C. Clarke originally published in 1973.

The stories, written between 1937 and 1971, originally appeared in a number of periodicals including Amateur Science Stories, Zenith, The Fantast, Fantasy, Startling Stories, Astounding, Science Fiction Quarterly, 10 Story Fantasy, Infinity Science Fiction, The Magazine of Fantasy & Science Fiction, The Evening Standard, Vogue, Analog, If, Boys' Life and Playboy.

== Contents ==
The contents include:

- 1933: A Science Fiction Odyssey
- "Travel by Wire!"
- "Retreat from Earth"
- "The Awakening"
- "Whacky"
- "Castaway"
- "History Lesson"
- "Hide and Seek"
- "Second Dawn"
- "The Sentinel"
- "The Star"
- "Refugee"
- Venture to the Moon
  - "The Starting Line"
  - "Robin Hood, F.R.S."
  - "Green Fingers"
  - "All That Glitters"
  - "Watch This Space"
  - "A Question of Residence"
- "Into the Comet"
- "Summertime on Icarus"
- "Death and the Senator"
- "Hate"
- "Sunjammer"
- "A Meeting with Medusa"
- Bibliography
