= Of Time and Stars =

1972 collection of short stories by Arthur C. Clarke

- Cover of the first edition
- Author: Arthur C. Clarke
- Language: English
- Genre: Science fiction
- Publisher: Gollancz
- Publication date: 1972
- Publication place: United Kingdom
- Media type: Print (hardback)
- Pages: 208
- ISBN: 0-575-01571-3
- OCLC: 539275
- Dewey Decimal: 823/.9/14
- LC Class: PZ3.C551205 Of3 PR6005.L36

Of Time and Stars is a collection of science fiction short stories by British writer Arthur C. Clarke, containing an introduction by J. B. Priestley.

The stories all originally appeared in a number of different publications including the periodicals Dude, The Evening Standard, Lilliput, The Magazine of Fantasy & Science Fiction, Future, New Worlds, Startling Stories, Astounding, Fantasy, King's College Review, Satellite, Amazing Stories, London Evening News, Infinity Science Fiction and Ten Story Fantasy as well as the anthologies Star Science Fiction Stories No.1 edited by Frederik Pohl and Time to Come edited by August Derleth.

== Contents ==
This collection, originally published in 1972, includes:

- Introduction by J.B. Priestley
- Foreword
- "The Nine Billion Names of God"
- "An Ape About the House"
- "Green Fingers"
- "Trouble with the Natives"
- "Into the Comet"
- "No Morning After"
- "If I Forget Thee, Oh Earth"
- "Who's There?"
- "All the Time in the World"
- "Hide and Seek"
- "Robin Hood, F.R.S."
- "The Fires Within"
- "The Forgotten Enemy"
- "The Reluctant Orchid"
- "Encounter at Dawn"
- "Security Check"
- "Feathered Friend"
- "The Sentinel"
- Bibliography: Books by Arthur C. Clarke
