= Childhood's End =

1953 novel by Arthur C. Clarke

- Cover of first edition hardcover
- Author: Arthur C. Clarke
- Cover artist: Richard M. Powers
- Language: English
- Genre: Science fiction
- Publisher: Ballantine Books
- Publication date: 1953
- Publication place: United Kingdom
- Media type: Print (hardcover and paperback)
- Pages: 214
- ISBN: 0-345-34795-1
- OCLC: 36566890

Childhood's End is a 1953 science fiction novel by the British author Arthur C. Clarke. The story follows a peaceful alien invasion of Earth by mysterious Overlords, whose arrival begins decades of apparent utopia under indirect alien rule, at the cost of human identity and culture.

Clarke's idea for the book began with his short story "Guardian Angel" (published in New Worlds #8, winter 1950), which he expanded into a novel in 1952, incorporating it as the first part of the book, "Earth and the Overlords". Completed and published in 1953, Childhood's End sold out its first printing, received good reviews and became Clarke's first successful novel. The book is often regarded by both readers and critics as Clarke's best novel and is described as "a classic of alien literature". Along with The Songs of Distant Earth (1986), Clarke considered Childhood's End to be one of his favourites of his own novels. The novel was nominated for the Retro Hugo Award for Best Novel in 2004.

Several attempts to adapt the novel into a film or miniseries have been made with varying levels of success. Director Stanley Kubrick expressed interest in the 1960s, but collaborated with Clarke on 2001: A Space Odyssey (1968) instead. The novel's theme of transcendent evolution also appears in Clarke's Space Odyssey series. In 1997, the BBC produced a two-hour radio dramatization of Childhood's End that was adapted by Tony Mulholland. The Syfy Channel produced a three-part, four-hour television miniseries of Childhood's End, which was broadcast on 14–16 December 2015.

== Plot summary ==
In the late 20th century, the United States and the Soviet Union are competing to launch the first spacecraft into orbit when alien spaceships suddenly position themselves above Earth's principal cities. After one week, the aliens announce they are assuming supervision of international affairs, to prevent humanity's extinction. They become known as the Overlords. In general, they let humans go on conducting their affairs in their own way, although some humans are suspicious of the Overlords' benign intent, as they never allow themselves to be seen.

The Overlord Karellen, the "Supervisor for Earth", periodically meets with Rikki Stormgren, the Secretary-General of the United Nations. Karellen tells Stormgren that the Overlords will reveal themselves in 50 years, when humanity will have become used to their presence. When the Overlords finally reveal their appearance, they resemble the traditional Christian folk images of demons, with cloven hooves, leathery wings, horns, and barbed tails. Humankind enters a golden age of prosperity at the expense of creativity.

The Overlords are interested in psychic research, which humans suppose is part of their anthropological study. Rupert Boyce, a prolific book collector on the subject, allows one Overlord, Rashaverak, to study these books at his home. To impress his friends with Rashaverak's presence, Rupert holds a party, during which he makes use of a Ouija board. Jan Rodricks, an astrophysicist and Rupert's brother-in-law, asks the identity of the Overlords' home star. The Ouija board reveals a number which Jan recognizes as a star-catalogue number and learns that it is consistent with the direction in which Overlord supply ships appear and disappear. Jan stows away on an Overlord supply ship and travels 40 light years to their home planet.

Well over a century after the Overlords' arrival, human children, beginning with the Greggsons', begin to display clairvoyance and telekinetic powers. Karellen reveals the Overlords' purpose: they serve the Overmind, a vast cosmic intelligence, as a kind of "bridge species", fostering other races' eventual union with it.

As Rashaverak explains, the time of humanity as a race composed of single individuals with a concrete identity is coming to an end. The children's minds reach into each other and merge into a single vast group consciousness. For the transformed children's safety, they are segregated on a continent of their own. No more human children are born and many parents die or commit suicide.

When Jan Rodricks returns to Earth, he finds a profoundly altered planet. Humanity has effectively become extinct and he is now the last true human alive. Some Overlords remain near Earth to study the children from a safe distance. When the evolved children mentally alter the Moon's rotation and make other planetary manipulations, it becomes too dangerous to remain. The departing Overlords offer to take Rodricks with them, but he chooses to stay to witness Earth's end and transmit a report of what he sees. His transmission ends with a view of a column of light stretching into the sky, the Earth becoming transparent, and a glow from within the core just before the Earth explodes, its energy siphoned by the departing children.

As his ship speeds away, Karellen somberly turns his back on a display of the sun.

== Publication history ==
=== Development ===
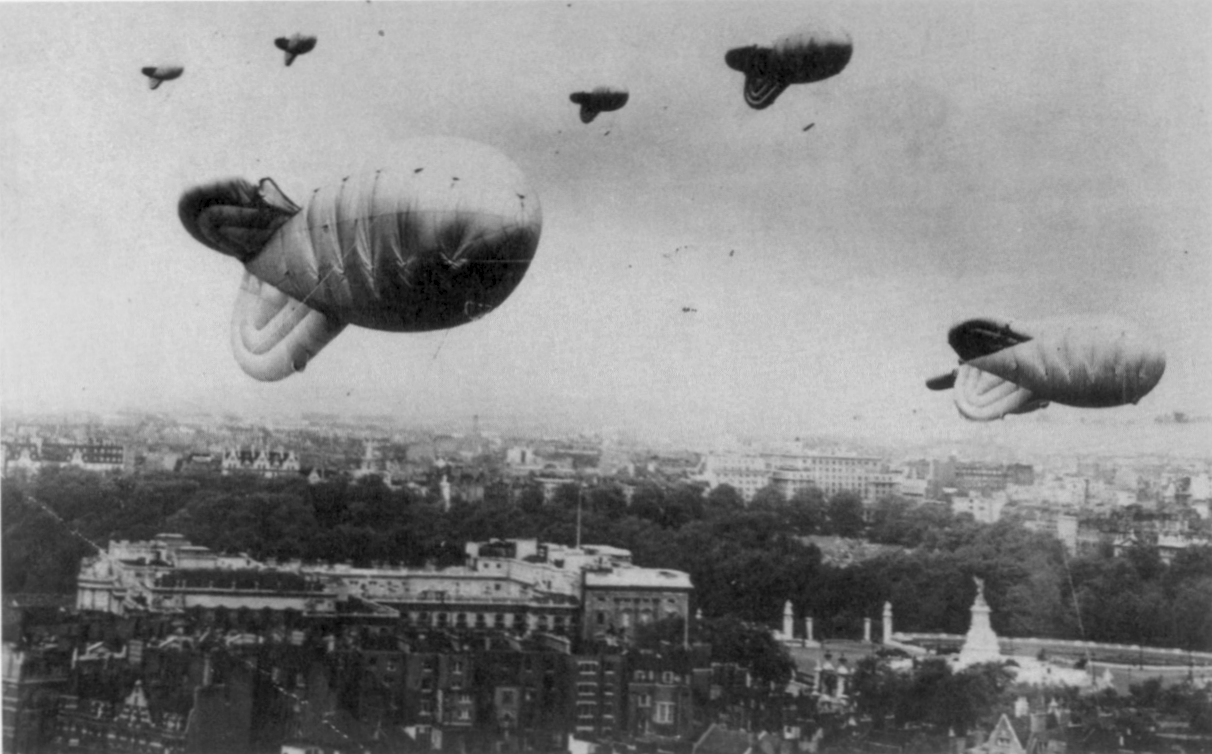
Barrage balloons over London during World War II. Clarke observed balloons like these floating over the city in 1941. He recalls that his earliest idea for the story may have originated with this scene, with the giant balloons becoming alien ships in the novel.

The novel first took shape in July 1946, when Clarke wrote "Guardian Angel", a short story that would eventually become Part I of Childhood's End. Clarke's portrayal of the Overlords as devils was influenced by John W. Campbell's depiction of the devilish Teff-Hellani species in The Mightiest Machine, first serialized in Astounding Stories in 1934. After finishing "Guardian Angel", Clarke enrolled at King's College London and served as the chairman of the British Interplanetary Society from 1946 to 1947 and from 1951 to 1953. He earned a first-class degree in mathematics and physics from King's in 1948, after which he worked as an assistant editor for Science Abstracts. "Guardian Angel" was submitted for publication but was rejected by several editors, including Campbell. At the request of Clarke's agent and unbeknown to Clarke, the story was edited by James Blish, who rewrote the ending. Blish's version of the story was accepted for publication in April 1950 by Famous Fantastic Mysteries magazine. Clarke's original version of "Guardian Angel" was later published in the Winter 1950 issue of New Worlds magazine.

After Clarke's nonfiction science book The Exploration of Space (1951) was successfully received, he began to focus on his writing career. In February 1952, Clarke started working on the novelization of "Guardian Angel"; he completed a first draft of the novel Childhood's End in December, and a final revision in January 1953. Clarke travelled to New York in April 1953 with the novel and several of his other works. Literary agent Bernard Shir-Cliff convinced Ballantine Books to buy everything Clarke had, including Childhood's End, "Encounter in the Dawn" (1953), (which Ballantine retitled Expedition to Earth), and Prelude to Space (1951). However, Clarke had composed two different endings for the novel, and the last chapter of Childhood's End was still not finished. Clarke proceeded to Tampa Bay, Florida, to go scuba diving with George Grisinger, and on his way there visited his friend Frederick C. Durant – President of the International Astronautical Federation from 1953 to 1956 – and his family in the Washington Metropolitan Area, whilst he continued working on the last chapter. He next traveled to Atlanta, Georgia, where he visited Ian Macauley, a friend who was active in the civil rights movement. Clarke finished the final chapter in Atlanta while Clarke and Macauley discussed racial issues; these conversations may have influenced the development of the last chapter, particularly Clarke's choice to make the character of Jan Rodricks – the last surviving member of the human species – a black man.

Clarke arrived in Florida at the end of April. The short story, "The Man Who Ploughed the Sea", included in the Tales from the White Hart (1957) collection, was influenced by his time in Florida. While in Key Largo in late May, Clarke met Marilyn Mayfield, and after a romance lasting less than three weeks, they travelled to Manhattan and married at New York City Hall. The couple spent their honeymoon in the Pocono Mountains in Pennsylvania, where Clarke proofread Childhood's End. In July, Clarke returned to England with Mayfield, but it quickly became clear that the marriage would not last as Clarke spent most of his time reading and writing, and talking about his work. Further, Clarke wanted to be a father, and Marilyn, who had a son from a previous marriage, informed Clarke after their marriage that she could no longer have children. When Childhood's End was published the following month, it appeared with a dedication: "To Marilyn, For letting me read the proofs on our honeymoon." The couple separated after a few months together, but remained married for the next decade.

=== Publication ===
Ballantine wanted to publish Childhood's End before Expedition to Earth and Prelude to Space, but Clarke wanted to wait. He felt that it was a difficult book to release. He had written two different endings for the novel and was unsure of which to use. According to biographer Neil McAleer, Clarke's uncertainty may have been because of its thematic focus on the paranormal and transcendence with the alien Overmind. While the theme was used effectively by Clarke in the novel, McAleer wrote that "it was not science fiction based on science, which he came to advocate and represent". When he wrote Childhood's End, Clarke was interested in the paranormal, and did not become a sceptic until much later in his life. Ballantine persuaded Clarke to let them publish Childhood's End first, and it was published in August 1953, with a cover designed by American science fiction illustrator Richard M. Powers. Childhood's End first appeared in paperback and hardcover editions, with the paperback as the primary edition, an unusual approach for the 1950s. For the first time in his career, Clarke became known as a novelist.

Decades later, Clarke was preparing a new edition of Childhood's End after the story had become dated. The initial chapter of the 1953 novel correctly foresees a race between the US and Soviet Union to first land men on the Moon (and the prominence of German rocket scientists in both space programmes), but sets it later than it would actually happen (post-1975; the exact year is not given in the text, but 1945 is said to be more than thirty years ago). After the book was first published, the Apollo missions landed humans on the Moon in 1969, and in 1989 US President George H. W. Bush announced the Space Exploration Initiative (SEI), calling for astronauts to eventually explore Mars. In 1990, Clarke added a new foreword and rewrote the first chapter, placing it in the early 21st century, changing the goal from the Moon to Mars, and implying a joint effort rather than a race. Editions since have appeared with the original opening or have included both versions. "Guardian Angel" has also appeared in two short story collections: The Sentinel (1983), and The Collected Stories of Arthur C. Clarke (2001).

On October 28, 2008, Audible released a 7-hour 47 minute unabridged audiobook version of Childhood's End, narrated by Eric Michael Summerer, under its Audible Frontiers imprint. An AudioFile review commended Summerer's narration as "smoothly presented and fully credible". An audio introduction and commentary is provided by Canadian science fiction author Robert J. Sawyer.

== Reception ==
The novel was well received by most readers and critics. Two months after publication, all 210,000 copies of the first printing had been sold. The New York Times published two positive reviews of the book: Basil Davenport compared Clarke to Olaf Stapledon, C. S. Lewis, and H. G. Wells, a "very small group of writers who have used science fiction as the vehicle of philosophic ideas". William DuBois called the book "a first rate tour de force that is well worth the attention of every thoughtful citizen in this age of anxiety". Don Guzman of the Los Angeles Times admired the novel for its suspense, wisdom, and beauty. He compared Clarke's role as a writer to that of an artist, "a master of sonorous language, a painter of pictures in futuristic colors, a Chesley Bonestell with words". Galaxy reviewer Groff Conklin called the novel "a formidably impressive job ... a continuous kaleidoscope of the unexpected". While acknowledging "inexpressible unpleasant and uncomfortable feelings after reading it", Japanese author Yukio Mishima declared, "I'm not afraid to call it a masterpiece."

Anthony Boucher and J. Francis McComas were more sceptical, and faulted the novel's "curious imbalance between its large-scale history and a number of episodic small-scale stories". While praising Clarke's work as "Stapledonian [for] its historic concepts and also for the quality of its prose and thinking", they concluded that Childhood's End was "an awkward and imperfect book". P. Schuyler Miller said the novel was "all imagination and poetry", but concluded it was "not up to some of Clarke's other writing" due to weakness in its "episodic structure".

Brian W. Aldiss and David Wingrove wrote that Childhood's End rested on "a rather banal philosophical idea...expressed in simple but aspiring language that vaguely recalls the Psalms combined with a dramatized sense of loss [for] undeniable effect".

In 2004 Childhood's End was nominated for a retrospective Hugo Award for Best Novel for 1954. In 2021, the novel was one of six classic science fiction novels by British authors selected by Royal Mail to feature on a series of UK postage stamps.

== Adaptations ==
In the 1960s, director Stanley Kubrick was interested in making a film adaptation of the novel, but blacklisted director Abraham Polonsky had already optioned it. Instead, Kubrick collaborated with Clarke on adapting the short story "The Sentinel" into what eventually became 2001: A Space Odyssey (1968). Months before his performance at Woodstock in 1969, folk singer and guitarist Richie Havens told Ebony magazine about his appreciation of Clarke's story and expressed his interest in working on a future film adaptation of Childhood's End. Screenplays by Polonsky and Howard Koch were never made into films.

David Elgood first proposed a radio adaptation of the novel in 1974, but nothing came of it in that decade.

Philip DeGuere, whose credits include the TV series Alias Smith and Jones, developed a script in the late 1970s for Universal, who planned to film it initially as a six-hour mini-series for CBS Television, and later as a two- or three-hour telemovie for ABC. However, Universal discovered that its contracts with Arthur C. Clarke – some of which dated back to 1957 – were out of date. These contractual difficulties were resolved in 1979 and DeGuere worked with comic book artist Neal Adams on preproduction drawings and other material. The project had Clarke's approval. However Universal decided that the budget required would be nearly $40 million and they were only prepared to spend $10 million, so the movie was not made.

Director Brian Lighthill revisited the radio adaptation proposal and obtained the rights in 1995. After Lighthill received a go-ahead from BBC Radio in 1996, he commissioned a script from Tony Mulholland, resulting in a new, two-part adaptation. The BBC produced the two-hour radio dramatization of the novel, and broadcast it on BBC Radio 4 in November 1997. The recording was released on cassette by BBC Audiobooks in 1998 and on CD in 2007.

As of 2002, film rights to the novel were held by Universal Pictures, with director Kimberly Peirce attached to a project.

On April 10, 2013, the Syfy Channel announced its plans to develop a Childhood's End TV miniseries.The three-episode, four-hour production premiered December 14, 2015. Charles Dance portrays the Supervisor Karellen.

An illustration of an Overlord as depicted by artist Wayne Barlowe was published in Barlowe's Guide to Extraterrestrials.

== Legacy ==
Childhood's End has inspired the work of many contemporary musicians and artists. These include Pink Floyd ("Childhood's End"), Van der Graaf Generator ("Childlike Faith in Childhood's End"), David Bowie ("Oh! You Pretty Things"), and Genesis ("Watcher of the Skies"). The novel also inspired the Hipgnosis cover art for Led Zeppelin's Houses of the Holy.

Childhood's End was a major influence on the 1998 Square game Xenogears, namely with the game's antagonist being named after Karellen.

The sixth episode of the 2023 Netflix series Gamera Rebirth was titled "Childhood’s end" as an homage to Arthur C. Clarke.

== See also ==
- 1953 in science fiction
- Earth: Final Conflict
- First contact (science fiction)
- Golden Age of Science Fiction
- The Cosmic Rape
- Zoo hypothesis
