= Tales from Planet Earth =

1989 collection of science fiction short stories by Arthur C. Clarke

Tales From Planet Earth
- First edition (UK)
- Author: Arthur C. Clarke
- Language: English
- Genre: Science fiction
- Publisher: Century Hutchinson (UK); Bantam Books (US)
- Publication date: 1989
- Publication place: United States
- Media type: Print (paperback)
- Pages: ix, 307 pp
- ISBN: 0-7126-3480-0
- OCLC: 20670171
- Dewey Decimal: 823/.914 20
- LC Class: PR6005.L36 T28 1990

Tales From Planet Earth is a collection of science fiction short stories by British writer Arthur C. Clarke, originally published in 1989.

== Contents ==
Contents of Tales From Planet Earth include:

- Preface, by Arthur C. Clarke and Isaac Asimov
- "The Road to the Sea"
- "Hate"
- "Publicity Campaign"
- "The Other Tiger"
- "The Deep Range"
- "If I Forget Thee, Oh Earth..."
- "The Cruel Sky"
- "The Parasite"
- "The Next Tenants"
- "Saturn Rising"
- "The Man Who Ploughed the Sea”
- "The Wall of Darkness"
- "The Lion of Comarre”
- "On Golden Seas"
