= Tales of Ten Worlds =

1962 collection of science fiction short stories by Arthur C. Clarke

- Cover of the first edition
- Author: Arthur C. Clarke
- Language: English
- Genre: Science fiction
- Publisher: Harcourt Brace
- Publication date: 1962
- Publication place: United States
- Media type: Print (hardcover)
- Pages: 245 pp

Tales of Ten Worlds is a collection of science fiction short stories by British writer Arthur C. Clarke. The stories all originally appeared in a number of different publications.

== Contents ==
This collection, originally published in 1962, includes the following:

- "I Remember Babylon"
- "Summertime on Icarus"
- "Out of the Cradle, Endlessly Orbiting..."
- "Who's There?"
- "Hate"
- "Into the Comet"
- "An Ape about the House"
- "Saturn Rising"
- "Let There be Light"
- "Death and the Senator"
- "Trouble With Time"
- "Before Eden"
- "A Slight Case of Sunstroke"
- "Dog Star"
- "The Road to the Sea"

== Reception ==
Avram Davidson received the collection favorably, praising Clarke's stories saying "Few writers in the field handle science with such knowledge as to be so convincing, such deftness as never to place stumbling-blocks, and with such clarity of style as to appear to have none at all."

== Editions ==
- Arthur C. Clarke (1962). Tales of Ten Worlds. Harcourt Brace. pp. 245 pp.
- Arthur C. Clarke (1988). Storie di Terra e Spazio (collana Urania n° 1039 ed.). Mondadori. ISBN 88-7819-669-X.
