= The Sentinel (collection) =

1983 English-language short story collection by Arthur C. Clarke

- Cover of the first edition
- Author: Arthur C. Clarke
- Illustrator: Lebbeus Woods
- Language: English
- Genre: Science fiction
- Publisher: Berkley Books
- Publication date: 1983
- Publication place: United States
- Media type: Print (paperback)
- Pages: 260
- ISBN: 0-425-06183-3
- OCLC: 10484555
- Dewey Decimal: 823/.914 19
- LC Class: PR6005.L36 S4 1983

The Sentinel is a collection of science fiction novelettes and short stories by English writer Arthur C. Clarke, originally published in 1983.

The stories, written between 1946 and 1981, originally appeared in a number of magazines including Astounding, Famous Fantastic Mysteries, Thrilling Wonder Stories, 10 Story Fantasy, If, The Magazine of Fantasy & Science Fiction, Boys' Life, Playboy and Omni.

== Contents ==
Contents of The Sentinel include:

- Introduction: Of Sand and Stars
- "The Sentinel"
- "Holiday on the Moon" (First edition only)
- "Earthlight" (First edition only)
- "Rescue Party"
- "Guardian Angel"
- "Breaking Strain"
- "Jupiter V"
- "Refugee"
- "The Wind from the Sun"
- "A Meeting with Medusa"
- "The Songs of Distant Earth"
- The Contributors
