= The Shining Ones =

Shining Ones may refer to:

- The Phaedriades, the two cliffs that enclose the sacred site of Delphi
- The second novel in The Tamuli trilogy by David Eddings
- "The Shining Ones", a short story by Arthur C. Clarke from the 1991 collection More Than One Universe
