= Ten Worlds =

Ten Worlds may refer to:

- The ten spiritual realms of Mahāyāna Buddhism
- Tales of Ten Worlds, a story collection by Arthur C. Clarke
- Ten Worlds Productions, a television production company
- Ten Worlds, Ten Directions, an art exhibit by Lindy Lee shown in 2002
