= Patent pending (disambiguation) =

Patent pending is an expression used in patent law.

Patent pending may also refer to:

- Patent Pending (album), the 2006 debut album of the American band Heavens
- Patent Pending (band), an American pop-punk band
- "Patent Pending" (short story), a short story by Arthur C. Clarke
