= Reach for Tomorrow =

1956 collection of science fiction short stories by Arthur C. Clarke

- First edition
- Author: Arthur C. Clarke
- Cover artist: Richard Powers
- Language: English
- Genre: Science fiction
- Publisher: Ballantine Books
- Publication date: 1956
- Publication place: United States
- Media type: Print (hardback & paperback)
- Pages: 166

Reach for Tomorrow is a 1956 collection of science fiction short stories by British writer Arthur C. Clarke. All the stories originally appeared in a number of different publications.

== Contents ==
This collection includes:

- "Preface"
- "Rescue Party"
- "A Walk in the Dark"
- "The Forgotten Enemy"
- "Technical Error"
- "The Parasite"
- "The Fires Within"
- "The Awakening"
- "Trouble With the Natives"
- "The Curse"
- "Time's Arrow"
- "Jupiter Five"
- "The Possessed"

== Reception ==
Galaxy reviewer Floyd C. Gale described the collection as "an excellent cross-section of the art of one of science fiction's foremost exponents." Anthony Boucher, however, characterized most of the shorter pieces as inferior work, excluded from Clarke's previous collection, but praised two (unspecified) novelettes as "uniquely authentic Clarke."

== Sources ==
- Tuck, Donald H. (1974). The Encyclopedia of Science Fiction and Fantasy. Chicago: Advent. p. 102. ISBN 0-911682-20-1.
