= Armaments Race =

Short story by Arthur C. Clarke

- Short story by Arthur C. Clarke
- Country: United Kingdom
- Language: English
- Genre: Science fiction

Publication
- Published in: Adventure
- Publication type: Magazine
- Publisher: Popular Publications
- Publication date: April 1954

Chronology
- Series: Tales from the White Hart
Patent Pending	Critical Mass

"Armaments Race" is a science fiction short story by British writer Arthur C. Clarke, first published in 1954, and later anthologized in Tales from the White Hart. Like the rest of the collection, it is a frame story set in the pub "White Hart", where the fictional Harry Purvis narrates the secondary tale.

== Plot ==
This comic story discusses the career of Hollywood special effects man Solly Blumberg after he is hired to create mock weapons as set pieces for a science-fiction serial named "Captain Zoom". Blumberg becomes involved in what is effectively an arms race as he creates weapons for both the protagonist and his adversaries. The weapons he creates become increasingly elaborate, until he accidentally creates a real functional piece and "makes the studio disappear", upon which he is sacked. The story is told from his prison cell, where he is questioned again and again by military experts, demanding to know what he had built.

== Publication ==
"Armaments Race" was first published in the April 1954 issue of Adventure magazine and was later published as the fourth story in Clarke's collection Tales from the White Hart. The story was included in the 2000 publication of The Collected Stories of Arthur C. Clarke and has been translated into multiple languages such as Dutch, Italian, Croatian, French, and German.

Robert Looby noted that a Polish translation of "Armaments Race" included content that had mild criticism of communism, which he stated was an example of the censors turning a "blind eye".
