= Exile of the Eons =

- Short story by Arthur C. Clarke
- Country: United Kingdom
- Language: English
- Genre: Science fiction

Publication
- Published in: Super Science Stories
- Publisher: Popular Publications
- Publication date: 1950

"Exile of the Eons" is a short story by English writer Arthur C. Clarke. It was first published in Super Science Stories (March 1950) and was later collected in Expedition to Earth under the title "Nemesis". It is also collected in The Collected Stories of Arthur C. Clarke.

== Plot ==
The first part of the story opens in a near future world, at the climax of a devastating world war, in which “The Master”, a Hitler-like figure, has tried and failed to dominate the world by military force. As the enemy closes in on his last stronghold in the Himalayas, the Master seals himself in a suspended animation chamber buried deep in the mountains. He intends to hibernate for one hundred years, after which he assumes that his enemies will have forgotten about him, and then resume his plans for world domination. However, a freak accident disables the mechanism which is supposed to revive him automatically, and the Master remains in suspended animation for billions of years while geological forces reshape the planet above him.

The second part of the story skips ahead to the far future when humanity has colonized the stars. Trevindor the Philosopher commits the unprecedented act of challenging the political and philosophical orthodoxy of this peaceful but uniform galaxy-spanning civilization, where dissent, criminality, violence and any form of conflict, are all virtually unknown. Instead of promising to give up his unorthodoxy, Trevindor chooses exile into future time, when the Sun is entering its red giant phase, and Earth is a parched, virtually lifeless desert. Trevindor explores the dying Earth, and has almost resigned himself to spending the rest of his life in isolation, when he finds the Master's hibernaculum, now exposed on the surface by millennia of erosion.

In the last part of the story, the two strands come together; Trevindor enters the chamber, and his presence apparently triggers the Master's revival. The Master is shocked to find another person in the chamber with him – more so when it becomes apparent that Trevindor can read his mind, and thinks there is nothing unusual about telepathy. The Master begins to suspect the truth of what has happened, but Trevindor has also learned the truth about the Master – and he must now choose whether to share his exile with a man of almost inhuman barbarism, or to commit an act of inhuman barbarism himself.

== See also ==
- The Awakening for another Clarke story about the hibernating Master.
