= Arthur C. Clarke's July 20, 2019: Life in the 21st Century =

1986 book by Arthur C. Clarke

Arthur C. Clarke's July 20, 2019: Life in the 21st Century is a book by Arthur C. Clarke, in collaboration with other contributors, published in 1986.

== Plot summary ==
Arthur C. Clarke's July 20, 2019: Life in the 21st Century is a book in which futurologists imagine a utopia in the early 21st century.

== Reception ==
Dave Langford reviewed Arthur C. Clarke's July 20, 2019: Life in the 21st Century for White Dwarf #90, and stated that "Clark's a good non-fiction writer, and I was surprised by the mediocrity of these essays on 2019's hospitals, roads, schools, transport, etc. It turns out that 'Ego' (as fans once called him) provided only the introduction and epilogue: the 14 people who wrote the rest are named on the back flap of the jacket, in Clark's small-print acknowledgements, and nowhere else. Good grief."

== Reviews ==
- Review by Geoffrey A. Landis (1986) in Fantasy Review, December 1986
- Review by Edward James (1987) in Vector 139
