= Crusade (short story) =

- Short story by Arthur C. Clarke
- Country: United States
- Language: English
- Genre: Science-fiction

Publication
- Published in: The Farthest Reaches
- Publication type: Anthology
- Publisher: Trident Press
- Media type: Print, book
- Publication date: 1968

"Crusade" is a short story by English writer Arthur C. Clarke, first published in 1968 and later reprinted in The Wind from the Sun as well as The Collected Stories of Arthur C. Clarke.

== Synopsis ==
The story follows the extremely long life span of an artificial intelligence that exists on a frozen planet in the vast space between two galaxies. The intelligence sends out scouts into another galaxy to seek other life like themselves, only to discover biological intelligences, whose physique is very different from their own. Tens of thousands of years pass to collect data about them, before the intelligence decides to send a "crusade", which will reach planet Earth in the year 2050.

== Release ==
"Crusade" was first published in 1968 as part of the anthology The Farthest Reaches, which was published by Trident Press. The following year it was given a French translation and released in the fifteenth fiction special for the magazine Histoires stellaires. It has subsequently been republished in several different collections that include The Wind from the Sun and The Collected Stories of Arthur C. Clarke. "Crusade" has been translated into approximately five languages, which include French, German, and Croatian.

== Themes ==
Themes covered in the story include the concept of humanity. In his paper "2001 in Perspective: The Fiction of Arthur C. Clarke", John Hollow covered the story along with "Dial F for Frankenstein", noting that "The thing mocked in each of these stories, however, is not the machine but man's assumption that he is the be-all and end-all of the universe." Zoran Živković covered "Crusade" in his 2018 paper, writing that "The transience and fragility of the world of the giant ammoniac mind–in aeonian proportions, of course–compel it to act to preserve itself. Thus it takes a step that Clarke considers to represent a necessary phase in the development of every cosmic being."

== Legacy ==
Soumya Banerjee cited "Crusade" as the inspiration for this 2016 paper "A Roadmap for a Computational Theory of the Value of Information in Origin of Life Questions".
