= Improving the Neighbourhood =

- Short story by Arthur C. Clarke
- Country: United Kingdom
- Language: English
- Genre: Science fiction

Publication
- Published in: Nature
- Publication type: Magazine
- Publication date: 4 November 1999

"Improving the Neighbourhood" is a science fiction short story by English writer Arthur C. Clarke. It was first published in Nature on 4 November 1999 and was the first piece of science fiction Nature ever published. It is also the last story included in The Collected Stories of Arthur C. Clarke, where it is dedicated to Dr. Pons and Dr. Fleischmann.

== Plot summary ==
The story is written as a monologue and tells of the development of a civilization and a disaster which destroys them when they are on the verge of abandoning their "clumsy chemically fuelled bodies and thus achieve multiple connectivity."
