= The Awakening (short story) =

1942 science fiction short story by Arthur C. Clarke

- Short story by Arthur C. Clarke
- Genre: Science fiction

Publication
- Published in: Zenith Sci-fi
- Publication date: February 1942

"The Awakening" is a science fiction short story by English writer Arthur C. Clarke. There are two distinct versions of this short story.

The first was originally published in Zenith Sci-fi fanzine issue number 4 in February 1942. This version was reprinted in The Best of Arthur C. Clarke. It is this version which appears in the almost complete The Collected Stories of Arthur C. Clarke.

A revised version was published in the collection Reach For Tomorrow in 1956, individually copyrighted to 1951.

== Plot summary ==
The protagonist is the Master who is suffering from heart failure and given less than a year to live. The Master opts to be frozen artificially for a hundred years in a remote location, after which he expects to be revived and get an artificial heart implanted in his body. However, the secret of his resting place has been lost over time, and the Master is only revived a long time later than expected (on the order of millions of years). He opens his eyes, eager to visualise how the future Man looked like, and is in for a terrible shock. As he looks at the insects surrounding him, he realises that Man had lost the Man-Insect war. Unable to take this in, his feeble heart gives in and he dies.

== See also ==
- Exile of the Eons for a reworking of this theme by Clarke.
