= Travel by Wire! =

1937 science fiction short story by Arthur C. Clarke

"Travel by Wire!" is a science fiction short story by English writer Arthur C. Clarke. His first published story, it was first published in December 1937 in the magazine Amateur Science Stories. It was subsequently published as part of the collection The Best of Arthur C. Clarke 1937-1955. This story is a humorous record on the development of the "radio-transporter" (actually a teleportation machine), and the various technical difficulties and commercial ventures that resulted. In The Collected Stories of Arthur C. Clarke, the author calls the story (as well as his other early writings) "a kind of absolute zero from which my later writing may be calibrated".
