= The Pacifist =

Short story by Arthur C. Clarke

- Short story by Arthur C. Clarke
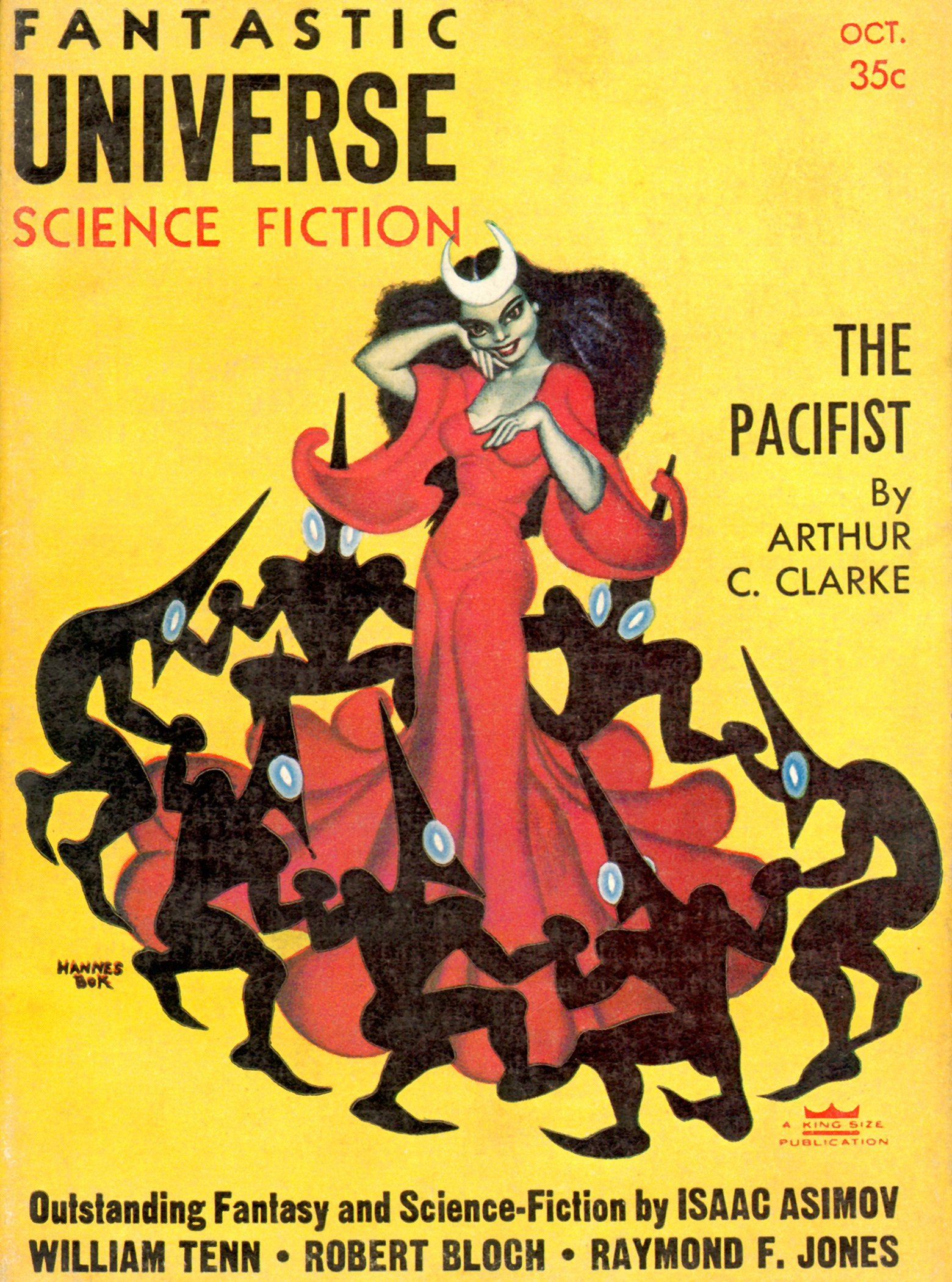
- Country: United Kingdom
- Language: English
- Genre: Science fiction

Publication
- Published in: Fantastic Universe
- Publisher: King Size Magazines
- Publication date: October 1956

Chronology
- Series: Tales from the White Hart
The Ultimate Melody	The Next Tenants

"The Pacifist" is a science fiction short story by British writer Arthur C. Clarke, first published in 1956 in Fantastic Universe. It appears in his collection of "science fiction tall tales," Tales from the White Hart. "The Pacifist" describes the construction of a supercomputer in a "cavern in Kentucky". The computer's designer, nicknamed "Dr. Milquetoast" by the story-within-a-story's narrator, works under the harsh supervision of a military General. By way of revenge, Dr. Milquetoast programs the computer so that it will answer purely theoretical or mathematical questions put to it, but when asked to solve a military problem, responds by insulting the General using phrases industriously prepared by the programmer. Frustration mounts as the General realizes that because the computer is aware of every known historical military battle, it is capable of recognizing such scenarios even when couched in purely mathematical terms.
