= Inheritance (short story) =

- Short story by Arthur C. Clarke
- Country: United Kingdom
- Language: English
- Genre: Science fiction

Publication
- Published in: New Worlds
- Publication type: magazine
- Publisher: Pendulum Publications
- Publication date: 1947

"Inheritance" is a science fiction short story by British writer Arthur C. Clarke, which was first published in 1947 in New Worlds, no. 3, as by 'Charles Willis'. It was subsequently published in the British edition of Astounding Science Fiction in 1949, and as part of a short story collection in Expedition to Earth in 1953.

It is a science-fiction story about two spaceship accidents involving a test pilot. The story contains elements which might be construed as supernatural. The title refers to a son who takes up his father's profession.

An interesting coincidence about this story from the 1940s is that the main payload rocket involved in the first accident is described in ways very similar to modern-day space shuttles.
