= Moving Spirit =

- Short story by Arthur C. Clarke
- Country: United Kingdom
- Language: English
- Genre: Science fiction

Publication
- Published in: Tales from the White Hart
- Publisher: Ballantine Books
- Publication date: 1957

Chronology
- Series: Tales from the White Hart
The Next Tenants	The Man Who Ploughed the Sea

"Moving Spirit" is a science fiction short story by British writer Arthur C. Clarke, first published in 1957. The story within a comic story is narrated by Harry Purvis, who is called to assist a scientist relative of his in a trial. The scientist has been brought before the local magistrate's court on charges of illegally distilling liquor. Purvis manages to get him acquitted, by arguing that he was actually working on a fictional "osmotic bomb". Unfortunately Purvis accidentally demonstrates this bomb by exploding it in the courtroom, thus conveniently destroying all the evidence. However, the scientist is almost immediately booked for driving under the influence due to the strong smell of alcohol from his wet clothes.

The piece is one of two original stories written for Clarke's collection Tales from the White Hart, the other being "The Defenestration of Ermintrude Inch."
