= The Wind from the Sun =

1972 collection of short stories by Arthur C. Clarke

- Dust-jacket of the first edition.
- Author: Arthur C. Clarke
- Language: English
- Genre: Science fiction
- Publisher: Harcourt Brace Jovanovich
- Publication date: 1972
- Publication place: United States
- Media type: Print (hardback)
- Pages: viii, 178
- ISBN: 0-15-196810-1
- OCLC: 293152
- Dewey Decimal: 823/.9/14
- LC Class: PZ3.C551205 Wi3 PR6005.L36

The Wind from the Sun (ISBN 0-15-196810-1) is a 1972 collection of science fiction short stories by British writer Arthur C. Clarke. Some of the stories originally appeared in a number of different publications. A part of the book was included in CD on board the Planetary Society's solar sail, Cosmos 1.

== Contents ==
This collection includes:

- Preface
- "The Food of the Gods"

Back cover teaser: "ON EARTH—In a world where man frowns upon his carnivorous ancestors and thrives upon entirely synthetic food, cannibalism becomes the question of the day."

- "Maelstrom II"

An astronaut father looks forward to returning home to his family on Earth, but is met by a life-threatening accident.

- "The Shining Ones"

Sabotage is suspected at a coastal Soviet base, where a revolutionary thermal electric technology is to be announced to the world within a matter of days.

- "The Wind from the Sun"

Back cover teaser: "IN SPACE—Space-sailing anyone? Come ride the sun's winds in the interstellar sailing contest of the century!" Problems arise for the competitors during this race to the moon.

- "The Secret"

Something fishy is going on in a laboratory on the Moon... An inspector presses a scientist for the truth about the Moon and mankind's longevity.

- "The Last Command"

The supreme commander of a superpower issues his final command via a pre-recorded message after he and the entire nation had been completely annihilated.

- "Dial F for Frankenstein"

A tech-crew discuss the strange happenings since they have linked the world's telecommunications system with a satellite network.

- "Reunion"

A message from extra-terrestrials, addressed to the people of Earth, speaking of the origins of mankind and a cure for skin color.

- "Playback"

A monologue of a man's consciousness which had been preserved on magnetic tape.

- "The Light of Darkness"

An assassin plots to remove the dictator of his African country.

- "The Longest Science-Fiction Story Ever Told"

A recursive letter complaining about plagiarism.

- "Herbert George Morley Roberts Wells, Esq."

Clarke's commentary about why he had confused "The Anticipator" with "The Accelerator". For a period of time Clarke believed that "The Anticipator" had been authored by H. G. Wells, and had even published this false fact, until a fan of Wells pointed out the error.

- "Love That Universe"

A scientist believes that the Earth is in peril and that the civilization living in the central hub of our galaxy is our only hope. But, how will we contact them?

- "Crusade"

In a world that does not orbit any star, an intelligent but non-biological being searches for other life in the universe like itself.

- "The Cruel Sky"

A scientist, who was born crippled, climbs Mount Everest with the aid of his levitation invention and with the guidance of his promising assistant. However, soon after beginning their descent from the summit, gale-strength winds blow them and their levitators off the face of the mountain.

- "Neutron Tide"

A commander explains, in a letter, how an Earth battleship got destroyed when it passed too close to the gravitational field of a neutron star.

- "Transit of Earth"

The last surviving astronaut of the first crewed landing on Mars works to complete his observations and recordings of Earth's transit across the face of the Sun. He and four others were marooned when permafrost melted underneath the landing craft and it toppled over. The others committed suicide to ensure him surviving to make these observations and he contemplates how he will commit suicide after the transit is over.

- "A Meeting with Medusa"

After recovering from the crash of the dirigible that he was commanding, Howard Falcon decides to explore Jupiter in a balloon.
