= Let There Be Light (Clarke short story) =

Short story by Arthur C. Clarke

- Short story by Arthur C. Clarke
- Country: United Kingdom
- Language: English
- Genre: Science fiction

Publication
- Published in: Playboy
- Publication date: September 1957
- Series: Tales from the White Hart

"Let There Be Light" is a science fiction short story by British writer Arthur C. Clarke, first published in 1957 in a Scottish Sunday newspaper. It was subsequently published in Playboy magazine, and was collected in Tales of Ten Worlds. It takes place in the same fictional setting as the stories in the collection Tales from the White Hart.

== Plot ==
The tale is told through a narrator that Clarke often uses, Harry Purvis, one of the regulars at the White Hart pub. He intervenes in a discussion of the depiction of "death rays" in pulp science fiction. Most science fiction pictures show a visible beam but visible light is harmless. However, Harry insists he knows of a death ray that was quite visible.

Harry relates the tale of Edgar Burton, a stockbroker who retires to the Yorkshire moors with his younger wife, who quickly tires of country life. Edgar soon realizes that she is having an affair, but he is content to carry on with his hobby of astronomy. However, he eventually feels that he is being made a fool, and is irritated that her midnight returns from her trysts are ruining his observing sessions as her car headlights shine on the house from a sharp bend in the road. Edgar concocts a scheme to kill his wife by building a searchlight and blinding her with it as she makes the bend, which is next to a cliff. In due course, he carries out the plan and sees the car plunge over the cliff.

Edgar is shocked to learn that he has killed the lover instead of his wife. The couple were about to elope, and the man was on his way to break the news. Edgar goes insane with guilt and is institutionalized, leaving his wife in charge of his considerable fortune.

Purvis ends the story by claiming that his "death ray" is real: it was a ray, and it killed somebody.
