= Jupiter Five =

- Short story by Arthur C. Clarke
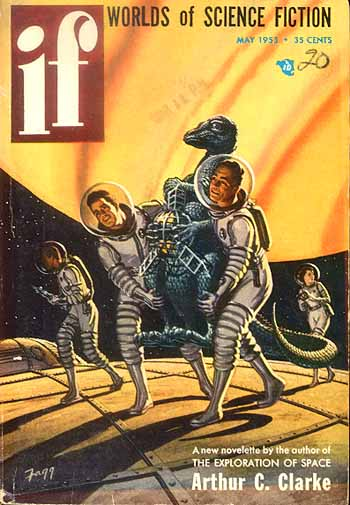
- Country: United Kingdom
- Language: English
- Genre: Science fiction

Publication
- Published in: If
- Publication date: May 1953

"Jupiter Five" is a science fiction short story by British writer Arthur C. Clarke, first published in the magazine If in May 1953. It reappeared in Clarke's collection of short stories in 1956, and concerns the detection and exploration of an ancient spaceship from outside the Solar System.

== Plot summary ==
Professor Forster, a scientist on an expedition with the spacecraft Arnold Toynbee, discovers that Jupiter V, the innermost satellite of Jupiter, is actually a spacecraft from "Culture X", an ancient race of reptiles from outside the Solar System. Culture X coexisted with insectoid Martians and settled the smaller rocky planets and moons throughout the Solar System, except for Earth's Moon. Jupiter V is a spherical metal vehicle with a diameter of 30 kilometers, containing an art gallery with millions of exhibits. One exhibit depicts a member of Culture X, whom Forster dubs "The Ambassador."

It becomes clear that "The Ambassador" was explicitly intended for Mankind. Culture X predicted that intelligent life would develop on Earth and eventually achieve space flight; the statue is a message of greeting and goodwill spanning the time between its creators' extinction and the arrival of space travelers from Earth.

Randolph Mays, a science writer, arrives with his pilot and secretary. Forster exploits a loophole in space law and claims salvage rights to Jupiter V in the name of the World Science Organization. Mays attempts to steal "The Ambassador" and other art objects, but Forster turns Mays' companions against him, forcing him to return the stolen items.

== Reception ==
According to David N. Samuelson, "Jupiter Five" is one of Clarke's "few attempts at melodrama", along with "Breaking Strain" (1949) and "Guardian Angel" (1950). Samuelson states that it represents one of the few instances in which Clarke overcame his "reluctance to tell traditional action-adventure story in the pulp tradition" due to "his literary allegiances and a desire to downplay the thoughtless romanticism evident in such tales of derring-do". Samuelson also suggests the work lacks significant literary importance.

== Influence ==
The idea of an artifact left by a spacefaring alien race for humans to discover after achieving space flight also appeared in "The Sentinel", a 1948 short story by Clarke (published 1951) about the discovery of an ancient artifact on the Moon. It served as the basis for 2001: A Space Odyssey, the 1968 novel and film Clarke developed with director Stanley Kubrick. However, the artifacts in "Sentinel" and "Odyssey" are speculated on (in "Sentinel") or explicitly stated (in the novel version of "Odyssey") as warnings that humans were in space.

Early drafts of the 2001 novel placed the Star Gate on Jupiter's moon Jupiter V instead of Iapetus as in the final version, revealing that Jupiter V had been artificially sculpted and placed into its orbit by the builders of the Star Gate.

"Jupiter Five" inspired The Diamond Moon, the fifth novel in the Venus Prime series by Paul Preuss.
