= Silence Please =

- Short story by Arthur C. Clarke
- Country: United Kingdom
- Language: English
- Genre: Science fiction

Publication
- Published in: Science-Fantasy
- Publication type: Magazine
- Publisher: Nova Publications
- Publication date: Winter 1950

Chronology
- Series: Tales from the White Hart
—	Big Game Hunt

"Silence Please" is the title of two science fiction short stories by British writer Arthur C. Clarke. The first was published in 1950 under the pseudonym Charles Willis. The second was used as the introductory story for Clarke's collection Tales from the White Hart.

The White Hart story describes the efforts of a brilliant college student to design a machine that would produce a field of absolute silence. The gadget is then used in a prank, with tragic results.

The magazine version is set in the distant future and has elements of satire of Labour policies. The name of the invention is the same, though the reason for its failure is different.

The "Fenton Silencer" described in the stories uses the same phase-inversion principle found in modern noise-canceling headphones.

The story was one of two works by Clarke translated by Hungarian writer and politician Árpád Göncz: the other was 2001: A Space Odyssey.
