= The Next Tenants =

Short story by Arthur C. Clarke

- Short story by Arthur C. Clarke
- Country: United Kingdom
- Language: English
- Genre: Science fiction

Publication
- Published in: Satellite Science Fiction
- Publication type: Magazine
- Publisher: Renown Publications
- Publication date: February 1957

Chronology
- Series: Tales from the White Hart
The Pacifist	Moving Spirit

"The Next Tenants" is a science fiction short story by British writer Arthur C. Clarke, first published in 1956 and included in several collections of Clarke's writings, including Tales from Planet Earth and Tales from the White Hart.

The story describes the discovery by the protagonist of a "mad scientist" living on a remote Pacific island, preparing for what he feels is humanity's inevitable self-destruction. The scientist decides that termites represent the best chance for a terrestrial species to form a stable civilization, and so is training a colony of termites in the use of technology. While the protagonist believes the scientist to be crazy, he wonders whether he may, after all, be right.
