= The Deep Range =

1957 science fiction novel by Arthur C. Clarke

- Cover of the first edition
- Author: Arthur C. Clarke
- Cover artist: Gordon C. Davies
- Language: English
- Genre: Science fiction
- Publisher: Frederick Muller Ltd
- Publication date: 1957
- Publication place: United Kingdom
- Media type: Print (hardcover)
- Pages: 238

The Deep Range is a 1957 science fiction novel by British writer Arthur C. Clarke, concerning a future sub-mariner who works in the field of mariculture, herding whales. The story includes the capture of a sea monster similar to a kraken.

The novel is based on a short story by the same name that Clarke wrote in November 1953 and which was first published in Frederik Pohl's Star Science Fiction No.3, copyrighted in 1954 but published in January 1955.

The short story was then published elsewhere, including in Argosy magazine in February 1956 and collected in Clarke's Tales from Planet Earth (1989).

== Plot ==
The Deep Range follows the career of former astronaut Walter Franklin in the Marine Division, rising from trainee, to game warden, and eventually to Director of the Bureau of Whales. A spacewalking mishap had left Franklin floating in space, out of contact and isolated for an extended period. The resulting severe acrophobia (termed astrophobia by Clarke) rendered him unable to function as an astronaut and forever isolated him from his family on Mars. He is forced to turn to the sea for a final attempt at rehabilitation.

The Division is a mid-21st Century sea-based organization responsible for feeding a sizable portion of the Earth's population through the farming and harvesting of plankton as well as the herding and slaughter of whales. The Whale Bureau employs wardens who in their single-person scout subs shepherd the whale pods and protect them from predatory orcas and sharks.

The narrative is divided into three sections.

Part I covers Franklin's training and adaptation to his new environment. Along the way he makes a lasting friend of his mentor and meets his eventual new wife. A recurrence of the astrophobia causes a breakdown and suicide attempt. An unexpected rescue convinces Franklin to commit fully to his new life.

Part II details Franklin's experiences as a veteran warden from the mundane to the more exotic. Abnormally high sperm whale deaths in a specific sector point to the existence of an enormous giant squid, nicknamed Percy. Franklin is tasked with spearheading the effort to find and capture Percy. A similar attempt later to capture the elusive Great Sea Serpent goes tragically awry.

Part III sees Franklin in charge as Director of the Bureau of Whales. Amid the everyday administrative and scientific challenges, the Bureau encounters a threat to its very existence. A Buddhist monk mounts a credible and effective campaign to stop the harvest of whales, even though it accounts for an eighth of the world's food supply. As Franklin struggles to counter the campaign, he finds himself inexorably drawn to the monk's viewpoint. An undersea catastrophe presents Franklin with his last opportunity to visit the depths he has grown to love.

In the final chapter Franklin and his wife attend the bittersweet departure of their son into the Space Service and reunion with his former family on Mars: "To his son, he willingly bequeathed the shoreless seas of space. For himself, the oceans of this world were sufficient."

== Setting ==
A lengthy portion of this novel takes place on an extrapolated Heron Island, Australia. Towards the end of the novel, the main character visits Anuradhapura, the ancient Sri Lankan city.

== Reception ==
Galaxy reviewer Floyd C. Gale praised the novel, describing it "as fresh and bright as dawn on a tropic sea." He later called the short story a "super duper topnotcher".

== See also ==
- 1957 in science fiction
- List of underwater science fiction works

== Sources ==
- Tuck, Donald H. (1974). The Encyclopedia of Science Fiction and Fantasy. Chicago: Advent. p. 101. ISBN 0-911682-20-1.
