= The Ultimate Melody =

Short story by Arthur C. Clarke

- Short story by Arthur C. Clarke
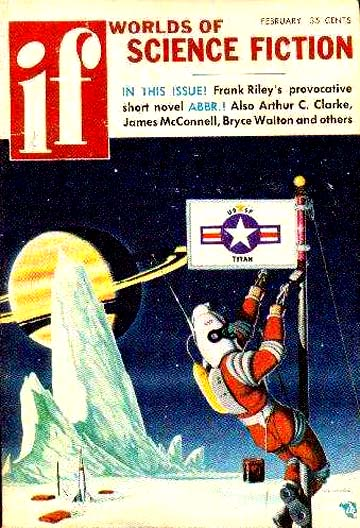
- Country: United Kingdom
- Language: English
- Genre: Science fiction

Publication
- Published in: If
- Publication type: Magazine
- Publisher: Quinn Publications
- Publication date: February 1957

Chronology
- Series: Tales from the White Hart
Critical Mass	The Pacifist

"The Ultimate Melody" is a science fiction short story by British writer Arthur C. Clarke, first published in 1957. The story describes the work of a physiologist who attempts to discover the connections between music and the rhythms of the electrical pulses in the brain. He believed that all "hit-tunes" were merely poor reflections of an "ultimate" melody, and he built a machine to search for this tune. By the end of the story, he succeeds, but the influence of the melody is so powerful that he becomes completely catatonic. The piece was later anthologized as the sixth story in Clarke's Tales from the White Hart. The story has been cited as an example of the literary motif of an apocalyptic work of art, found more famously in The King in Yellow, by Robert W. Chambers. The story has also been analyzed as an example of music in speculative fiction reflecting a "Platonic ideal", or a primal aspect of the universe.
