= The Lion of Comarre and Against the Fall of Night =

The Lion of Comarre & Against the Fall of Night
- Dust-jacket from the first edition
- Author: Arthur C. Clarke
- Language: English
- Genre: Science fiction novel
- Publisher: Harcourt
- Publication date: 1968
- Publication place: United States
- Media type: Print (hardcover)
- Pages: x, 214 pp

The Lion of Comarre & Against the Fall of Night are early stories by Arthur C. Clarke collected together for publication in 1968 by Harcourt Brace and by Gollancz in London in 1970, it has been reprinted several times. Both concern Earth in the far future, with a utopian but static human society.

Against the Fall of Night was later expanded and revised as The City and the Stars, one of Clarke's best-known works.

The Lion of Comarre has a similar theme: it is about a dissatisfied young man in search of "something more" in a future society that believes it has discovered everything and ceases to advance. It does not, however, exist in the same 'future history' as Against the Fall of Night.
