= What Goes Up (short story) =

- Short story by Arthur C. Clarke
- Country: United Kingdom
- Language: English
- Genre: Science fiction

Publication
- Published in: The Magazine of Fantasy and Science Fiction
- Publisher: Fantasy House
- Publication date: January 1956

Chronology
- Series: Tales from the White Hart
Cold War	Sleeping Beauty

"What Goes Up" is a science fiction short story by English writer Arthur C. Clarke, first published in 1956, and later anthologized in Tales from the White Hart. Like the rest of the collection, it is a frame story set in the fictional White Hart pub, where Harry Purvis narrates the secondary tale. The title is a reference to the common phrase "What goes up must come down".

== Plot ==
The story narrated by Purvis is provoked by the entry of a U.F.O. enthusiast into the White Hart. In order to quell his stories, Purvis spins a tale describing an attempt by an Australian researcher nicknamed "Dr. Cavor" to develop atomic power. Cavor designs and builds an atomic generator, but by some accident, he ends up creating a field of lower gravity around the generator, such that from a physics point of view it has been elevated to an altitude of several thousand miles. This has the effect of producing an impenetrable barrier around the generator. In order to overcome it and investigate, Cavor builds a special jeep that will, in effect, winch itself along a climb of several thousand miles to the center. He performs the journey successfully, only to forget himself and step out of the jeep once there. Freed of its restraint, he "falls" back to earth from that height, thus turning into a human meteor. The story is enough to silence the U.F.O. believer; however, Purvis later gets thousands of letters from other believers, much to his annoyance, because the story was not meant to be taken seriously.

== Publication ==
Originally published in The Magazine of Fantasy and Science Fiction, the piece was later published as the thirteenth story in Clarke's collection Tales from the White Hart. It has also been published as "What Goes Up..."
