= The Possessed (short story) =

1953 science fiction by Arthur C. Clarke

- Short story by Arthur C. Clarke
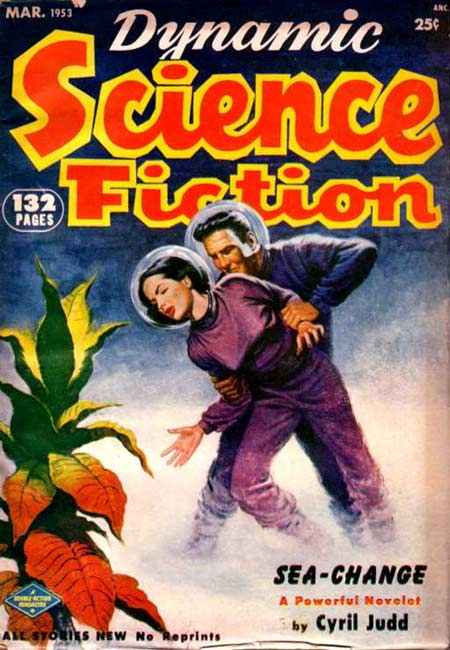
- Country: United Kingdom
- Language: English
- Genre: Science fiction

Publication
- Published in: Dynamic Science Fiction
- Publication date: March 1953

"The Possessed" is a science fiction short story by British writer Arthur C. Clarke, first published in 1953.

The concept for the story was suggested by Mike Wilson.

== Plot summary ==
A swarm of disembodied aliens, whose home world was destroyed, are in search of an animal species which they can inhabit and guide to intelligence. While many, the swarm operates as a single being. They wander the cosmos and growing weary, find a reptilian species that appeared promising but were not as evolved as the swarm would prefer. The swarm debates leaving the planet and continuing the search or leaving a portion of itself behind. It is decided that it would be wise to leave part of the swarm on the planet, where it can watch the hosts evolve until they are ready to properly guide. The rest will continue to travel and will return if they found a better potential home.

Each year the swarm-possessed hosts will travel to a certain location on the planet's surface in search of the swarm's return. As much time passes the location sinks into the ocean, however the hosts continue to seek this location out. They continue to guide the hosts' evolution, going from small reptiles to tiny furry beasts that produce live young. During this evolution the swarm portion realizes that they chose their hosts poorly, as their intelligence only diminishes rather than grow, but can do nothing as their strength grows increasingly weaker and they lose parts of their memory. The pilgrimage now becomes a point of desperation, as they hope to get reabsorbed by the main swarm and regain what they have lost. Time continues to progress until all that is left of the swarm is the urge to travel to the set location.

The story then cuts to modern day, where a man and woman are taking a trip on a pleasure steamer. The woman notices a group of animals gathered on the shore of a nearby island and wonders why they exhibit such strange behaviors. The man replies that the reason is unknown before guiding his partner inside. As the steamer leaves, the lemmings on the beach continue their migration into the ocean despite having no memory or idea as to why.

== Publication history ==
"The Possessed" was first published in the March 1953 issue of Dynamic Science Fiction. The year is occasionally incorrectly listed as 1952. It was subsequently published in the collection Reach for Tomorrow in 1956 as well as in collections and anthologies such as The Collected Stories of Arthur C. Clarke and More Than One Universe.

The story has been published in multiple languages that include French, German, and Serbian.

== Themes ==
Themes in "The Possessed" include alien visitors and evolution. John Hollow has noted that the story's ending is a nod to the potential for humanity to de-evolve into a similar state.

== Reception ==
"The Possessed" has received some criticism over its depiction of lemmings as suicidal, as the animal's jump into water is for migratory purposes rather than self-destruction.

== See also ==
- The Puppet Masters
- The Host
