= Prelude to Space =

1947 novel by Arthur C. Clarke

- Cover of the first edition
- Author: Arthur C. Clarke
- Cover artist: Bunch (per signature)
- Language: English
- Genre: Science fiction
- Publisher: World Editions Inc.
- Publication date: 1951
- Publication place: United States
- Media type: Print (Digest)
- Pages: 160

Prelude to Space is a science fiction novel written by British author Arthur C. Clarke in 1947. It appeared for the first time in 1951 as a paperback from World Editions Inc, as number three in its series of Galaxy novels. Sidgwick & Jackson published it in the UK in 1953, followed the next year by a United States hardcover edition from Gnome Press and a paperback from Ballantine Books.

== Plot summary ==
Prelude to Space recounts the fictional events leading up the launch of Prometheus, the world's first spacecraft capable of reaching the Moon. Prometheus consists of two components, named Alpha and Beta. Alpha is designed for travel from Earth orbit to the Moon and back. It is not capable of independent atmospheric flight. Beta is a nuclear-powered flying wing which carries Alpha into orbit. Beta uses a nuclear reactor to superheat either air (when flying in the lower, denser, part of the atmosphere) or its own internal supply of methane (in the higher reaches of the atmosphere and in space) to achieve thrust. Beta functions as a ramjet in the lower atmosphere and must be launched using an electric launch track. The return journey to the Moon proceeds as follows: Beta carries Alpha into orbit; Alpha separates from Beta and refuels from tanks previously carried into orbit by Beta; Alpha flies to and lands on the Moon while Beta remains in Earth orbit; Alpha returns to Earth orbit and the crew returns to Earth aboard Beta; Alpha remains in orbit to await the next flight.

Prelude was written before the Apollo program landed men on the Moon and follows the ideal that space travel is realistic and within the grasp of the population. Clarke wrote a new preface in 1976 in which he admits that he had some propagandist goals in writing Prelude to Space — he was an influential member of the astronautics community when the idea of rockets leaving Earth's atmosphere was scoffed at by many scientists.

The novel ends with the launching of Prometheus; the entire plot consists of scientists, engineers and administrators showing Dr. Dirk Alexson how the mission was planned and how the technology will work. Dr. Alexson is the historian assigned to prepare the official history of the Moon mission.

Prelude to Space has also been published under the titles Master of Space and The Space Dreamers.

== Reception ==
Groff Conklin characterized Prelude as a "genuinely effective 'documentary of tomorrow'". Boucher and McComas praised the novel, saying that Clarke handled scientific detail "with so sensitive a poetic understanding that this simple factual narrative is more absorbing than the most elaborately plotted galactic epic." P. Schuyler Miller reviewed it favorably, citing its "documentary quality" and "many of the poetic bits" that mark Clarke's work.

== Sources ==
- Chalker, Jack L.; Mark Owings (1998). The Science-Fantasy Publishers: A Bibliographic History, 1923-1998. Westminster, MD and Baltimore: Mirage Press, Ltd. pp. 303–304.
