= The Man Who Ploughed the Sea =

Short story by Arthur C. Clarke

- Short story by Arthur C. Clarke
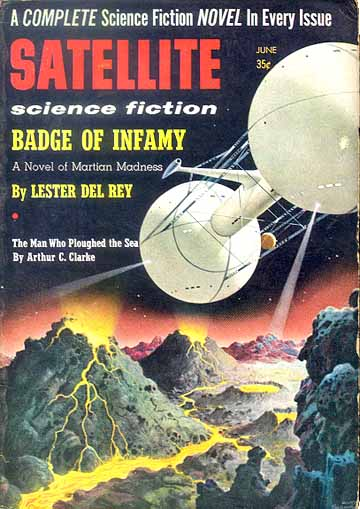
- Country: United Kingdom
- Language: English
- Genre: Science fiction

Publication
- Published in: Satellite Science Fiction
- Publisher: Renown Publications
- Publication date: June 1957

Chronology
- Series: Tales from the White Hart
Moving Spirit	The Reluctant Orchid

"The Man Who Ploughed the Sea" is a science fiction short story by British writer Arthur C. Clarke, first published in 1957. The story within a story is narrated by Harry Purvis, who recalls a holiday spent submarining off of the Florida Keys. While there, he happens to witness a meeting between two wealthy and talented scientists, one of whom has designed a method to extract trace elements from seawater. He trades his secret to the other in exchange for the other's fancy yacht, but it turns out that the process is not yet commercially viable.

The piece was later published as the tenth story in Clarke's collection Tales from the White Hart.
