= The Forgotten Enemy =

- Short story by Arthur C. Clarke
- Country: United Kingdom
- Language: English
- Genre: Science fiction

Publication
- Published in: New Worlds
- Publication date: 1949

"The Forgotten Enemy" is a science fiction short story by English writer Arthur C. Clarke, first published in the magazine New Worlds, in August 1949. It was included in Clarke's collection of science fiction short stories Reach for Tomorrow, in 1956. It shows a London professor lonely holding out in his native city that has been evacuated due to an upcoming ice age.

== Plot summary ==
The Solar System has dived into a belt of cosmic dust; Britain's climate has changed from temperate to arctic.

Professor Millward has stayed with his books, when the country was abandoned more than twenty years ago, and lost track of the others' attempts to colonize the rapidly transforming jungles and deserts of the south, also via the radio, some years later. He is now sheltering from the cold in the edifice of a London university. Over months, he is haunted by a mysterious sound from the north, which he attributes to "mountains on the march", in his dreams. Roaming about the snow-bound familiar roads and houses of the city long after the last stray dogs have disappeared from them, he is surprised by wolves, reindeer, and polar bears, and therefore ponders if the roaring in the north may be caused by an expedition from North America across the frozen-over Atlantic or by efforts to free the land from ice and snow with atomic bombs. When he climbs to his usual look-out, on an especially clear day, he finally detects the real origin of the northern sound, catching sight of the glitter of a threatening mass of glacial ice that is relentlessly advancing towards him.
