= The Reluctant Orchid =

Short story by Arthur C. Clarke

- Short story by Arthur C. Clarke
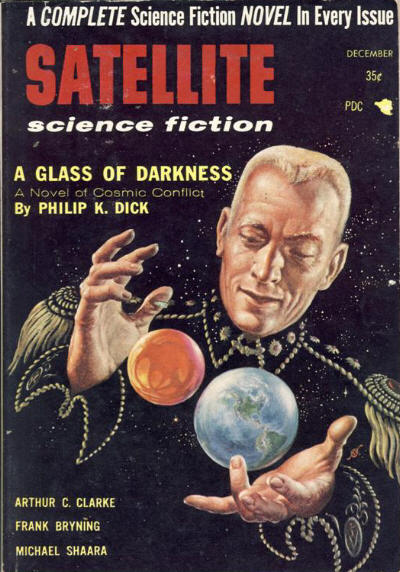
- Country: United Kingdom
- Language: English
- Genre: Science fiction

Publication
- Published in: Satellite Science Fiction
- Publisher: Renown Publications
- Publication date: December 1956

Chronology
- Series: Tales from the White Hart
The Man Who Ploughed the Sea	Cold War

"The Reluctant Orchid" is a science fiction short story by British writer Arthur C. Clarke, first published in 1956, and later anthologized in Tales from the White Hart. Like the rest of the collection, it is a frame story set in the fictional "White Hart" pub, where the fictional Harry Purvis narrates the secondary tale.

According to the American orchid biologist, Joseph Arditti, Clarke told him that the story was inspired by the H. G. Wells story "The Flowering of the Strange Orchid" (1894, Pall Mall Budget), which is mentioned in Clarke's story, about a carnivorous orchid that almost kills the man who buys it at auction.

== Plot ==
The story narrated by Purvis describes the relationship between a very timid acquaintance of his named Hercules Keating, and Hercules's rather overbearing aunt. Hercules is an orchid fancier, and cultivates obscure varieties of these. On one particular occasion, he comes across a carnivorous orchid, and is nearly killed by it. This inspires him to use it to murder his aunt, whom he hates. However, the aunt tames the orchid, thus deflating the scheme.

== Publication ==
Originally published in the magazine Satellite Science Fiction, the piece was later published as the eleventh story in Clarke's collection Tales from the White Hart.

== Legacy ==
Hollywood writer Dennis McDougal suggests that Charles B. Griffith's screenplay for the 1960 film The Little Shop of Horrors may have been influenced by Clarke's story.
