= The Food of the Gods (short story) =

- Short story by Arthur C. Clarke
- Country: United Kingdom
- Language: English
- Genre: Science fiction

Publication
- Published in: Playboy
- Publication date: May 1964

"The Food of the Gods" is a science fiction short story by British writer Arthur C. Clarke, first published in 1964. It was subsequently published as part of a short story collection The Wind from the Sun in 1972.

The title is in reference to ambrosia, the mythical food of the ancient Greek gods and the brand name of the controversial food product discussed in this story. The title could also be seen as a tribute to the novel The Food of the Gods and How It Came to Earth by H. G. Wells.
