= Saturn Rising =

- Short story by Arthur C. Clarke
- Genre: Science fiction

Publication
- Published in: The Magazine of Fantasy & Science Fiction
- Publication type: Periodical
- Media type: Print
- Publication date: March 1961

"Saturn Rising" is a short story by the British writer Arthur C. Clarke. It was first published in March 1961 in The Magazine of Fantasy & Science Fiction. It was included in Tales of Ten Worlds, a collection of stories by Clarke first published in 1962. It has been translated into French, German, Italian and Croatian. The story imagines the development of space tourism.

== Story summary ==
The narrator, talking as though the subject has arisen during a conversation, tells the story of his association with Morris Perlman.

The narrator, back from a pioneering voyage to Saturn, first meets him while breakfasting at his hotel during a lecture tour. Perlman attended the narrator's lecture the previous evening, and tells him that he was always fascinated by Saturn: he saw Chesley Bonestell's paintings; a memorable moment in his youth was seeing the planet for the first time, with a home-made telescope. His father, manager of a hotel in Third Avenue, New York, with business worries, resented his timewasting and destroyed the telescope. When the Third Avenue El closed, land values there rose and the hotel business, now run by Perlman, expanded. The narrator learns afterwards that Perlman owns the hotel where he is staying, and many others.

He meets Perlman a few years later, after a second voyage to Saturn, in an expensive restaurant that Perlman owns. Perlman wants to know what it is like to be near Saturn, and the narrator describes it. He asks which moon of Saturn would be best for a tourist resort; he dismisses the response that tourism is out of the question because of the distance and expense, saying that places in the world that were remote centuries ago are now tourist destinations. The narrator suggests Titan.

When Perlman is very old, and paragravity drives, of which he financed the research, have replaced rocket propulsion, he offers the narrator a job. The circumstance of the narrator's conversation becomes clear. "Even after all these years," he says to his dining companions, "I still like to watch Saturn rising."

== See also ==
- Saturn in fiction
- Titan in fiction
