= The Secret (short story) =

Science-fiction short story by Arthur C. Clarke

- Short story by Arthur C. Clarke
- Country: United Kingdom
- Language: English
- Genre: Science fiction

Publication
- Published in: This Week
- Publication date: August 11, 1963

"The Secret" is a science fiction short story by British writer Arthur C. Clarke, first published as "The Secret of the Men on the Moon" in the August 11, 1963 issue of This Week magazine. It was later collected in The Wind from the Sun (1972) as "The Secret".

== Plot summary ==
"The Secret" is about a science reporter named Henry Cooper, who goes to the Moon to write a series of publicity articles. Although invited by the U.N.S.A space division to provide favorable articles that might sway public opinion before the beginning of budget deliberations, on this visit he is much less welcome than he was on previous trips. He begins to suspect that a secret is being kept from him and becomes increasingly curious. A few days later, his friend the police commissioner takes him to a remote lab.

There Cooper confronts one of the head scientists, who becomes convinced that the only way to keep the reporter silent is to bring him in on the secret. The scientist explains that the secret is rather obvious when you come to think about it—it's a wonder humankind hasn't already thought of it. On Earth, over several decades, a human heart pumps many gallons of blood upstream. Gravity tugs and pulls on the organs and tissues. On the Moon, however, everything is six times lighter than on Earth. The erosion of gravity is six times weaker. Who knows, concludes the scientist, how many years that might add to human life expectancy? People could live up to 200 years of age.

The reporter is then confronted with the sheer numbers of Earth's population - over six billion huddled together with not enough food and not enough space, relying on "sea farms" to provide food without sacrificing land.
