= Earthlight (novella) =

1951 science fiction novella by Arthur C. Clarke

- Author: Arthur C. Clarke
- Language: English
- Genre: Science fiction
- Published in: Thrilling Wonder Stories
- Publication date: August 1951
- Publication place: United Kingdom

Earthlight is a science fiction novella by British writer Arthur C. Clarke, first published in the August 1951 issue of Thrilling Wonder Stories. It was later expanded into the novel Earthlight in 1955.

== Plot summary ==
The short story details two astronomers caught outside their base on the Moon as a battle rages between the forces of Earth and the Federation of the outer planets of the Solar System over possession of the Moon's supply of uranium. It differs dramatically from the novel in chronology - the story is set in c. 2015, while the novel is c. 2175. In most other respects the plot of the short story is retained by the novel.
