= Superiority (short story) =

1951 story by Arthur C. Clarke

- Short story by Arthur C. Clarke
- Country: United Kingdom
- Language: English
- Genre: Science fiction

Publication
- Published in: The Magazine of Fantasy & Science Fiction
- Publisher: Fantasy House
- Publication date: August 1951

"Superiority" is a science fiction short story by British writer Arthur C. Clarke, first published in 1951. It depicts an arms race during an interstellar war. It shows the side which is more technologically advanced being defeated, despite its apparent superiority, because of its willingness to discard old technology without having fully perfected the new. Meanwhile, the enemy steadily built up a far larger arsenal of weapons that, while more primitive, were also more reliable. The story was at one point required reading for an industrial design course at the Massachusetts Institute of Technology.

== Plot ==
The story is told in the form of a letter of pleading to a court deciding the fate of the former commander of a great allied space fleet. He starts the letter by describing that their final defeat was due not to the inferiority of their forces, but their superiority.

When the war opens, the allied forces have a great advantage both in number of spaceships and the power of their weapons. At the Battle of the Five Suns the enemy does surprisingly well, although ultimately losing. Spooked, the allies confer with their new Chief of the Research Staff, Professor-General Norden. He states their existing weapons have reached the limits of the potential and begins development of terrifyingly powerful new weapons.

The first of these is repeatedly delayed, and the allies pause their attacks while they wait for their ships to be fitted with the new missiles. The enemy uses these delays to capture several former allied systems. Instead of simply counterattacking with their current weapons, Norden develops still newer weapons that will make up for these losses. Each is temporarily successful, but each invariably leads to insurmountable problems and further losses.

The story ends with the author admitting their defeat, but begging the court's favour as he can no longer be held responsible "for my future actions if I am compelled any longer to share my cell with Professor Norden, late Chief of the Research Staff of my armed forces."

== Publication ==
After its initial publication in the August 1951 edition of The Magazine of Fantasy & Science Fiction, "Superiority" was included in Clarke's 1953 anthology Expedition to Earth, the 1981 anthology The 7 Cardinal Virtues of Science Fiction (where it represented temperance), the 1987 military science fiction collection Battlefields Beyond Tomorrow, and the 2001 anthology The Best Military Science Fiction of the 20th Century.

== See also ==
- The Collected Stories of Arthur C. Clarke
- Illusory superiority
- Sunk cost
- Opportunity cost
- Unintended consequence
- Wonder weapons
