= Trouble with the Natives =

- Short story by Arthur C. Clarke
- Country: United Kingdom
- Language: English
- Genre: Science fiction

Publication
- Published in: Lilliput
- Publication date: August 1951

"Trouble with the Natives" is a science fiction short story by British writer Arthur C. Clarke, first published in 1951. This comic story describes the pains of aliens visiting an English village, as every effort at contact with humans gets frustrated. The story was also published as "The Men in the Flying Saucer".

This story has similarities with Clarke's other short stories "History Lesson" and "Rescue Party": in all three pieces, aliens draw naive and humorous conclusions about humans from little information.
