= I Remember Babylon =

- Short story by Arthur C. Clarke
- Country: United Kingdom
- Language: English
- Genre: Science fiction

Publication
- Published in: Playboy
- Publication date: May 1960

"I Remember Babylon" is a science fiction short story by British writer Arthur C. Clarke. It was first published in Playboy in May 1960, and reprinted in the 1962 collection Tales of Ten Worlds.

A later anthology of Clarke's works included a note from the author about this story saying that everything he predicted in it had come true.

== Plot summary ==
The story takes the form of a non-fiction article by Clarke in which he warns the United States that the People's Republic of China is planning to, using a Russian rocket, launch a communications satellite in geostationary orbit to broadcast directly to Americans. The satellite will offer an uncensorable mix of heterosexual and homosexual pornography (using the Kinsey Report as market research), gore (such as details of bullfights and photographic evidence from the Nuremberg trials), and communist propaganda. The American ex-ad man and Communist sympathizer that reveals the plan to Clarke thanks his influential 1945 article on satellite transmission for giving China the idea, and boasts that "History is on our side. We'll be using America's own decadence as a weapon against her, and it's a weapon for which there's no defence".

One of the pornographic films in the story is described as depicting the erotic sculptures of the Konark Sun Temple in Odisha (Clarke uses the variant spelling of "Konarak").
