= Tales from the White Hart =

Collection of short stories by Arthur C. Clarke

- Cover of the first edition
- Author: Arthur C. Clarke
- Cover artist: Richard M. Powers
- Language: English
- Genre: Fantasy, science fiction
- Publisher: Ballantine Books
- Publication date: 1957
- Publication place: United Kingdom
- Media type: Print (paperback)
- Pages: 151 pp

Tales from the White Hart is a 1957 collection of short stories by science fiction writer Arthur C. Clarke, in the "club tales" style.

Thirteen of the fifteen stories originally appeared across a number of different publications; some had no connection to the White Hart in their original version. "Silence Please" was the title of two distinct stories; the version in the book has a different plot from the original magazine version. "Moving Spirit" and "The Defenestration of Ermintrude Inch" were first published in this book.

The White Hart is a pub (modelled on the White Horse, New Fetter Lane, just north of Fleet Street, once the weekly rendezvous of science fiction fans in London till the mid-1950s, when they moved to the Globe pub in Hatton Garden) where a character named Harry Purvis tells a series of tall tales. Incidental characters inhabiting the White Hart include science fiction writers Samuel Youd (also known as John Christopher), John Wyndham (John Beynon), and Clarke himself in addition to the narrative voice as his pseudonym Charles Willis.

The style and nature of the stories was inspired by the Jorkens stories of the writer Lord Dunsany, whom Clarke admired and with whom he corresponded, a fact humorously acknowledged by Clarke in his introduction to the first Jorkens omnibus volume.

According to Clarke's preface to the book, the book was his third collection of short stories, which were written between 1953 and 1956 in such diverse spots as New York, Miami, Colombo, London and Sydney.

One additional story from the White Hart 'universe', "Let There Be Light", is reprinted in Tales of Ten Worlds.

Clarke and Stephen Baxter collaborated on one final White Hart story, "Time, Gentlemen, Please" for a 2007 limited edition from PS Publishing, issued for the book's 50th anniversary. ("Let There Be Light" does not appear in that edition.)

== Contents ==
The collection, originally published in paperback in 1957 by Ballantine Books, includes the following stories.

| Title | Time of first publication | First edition publisher/publication | Summary | Citations |
|---|---|---|---|---|
| "Silence Please" | Winter 1950 | Science Fantasy | The story describes the efforts of a brilliant college student to design a machine that would produce a field of absolute silence by inverting the sound waves it senses. The gadget is then used in a prank at an opera house. | |
| "Big Game Hunt" | October 1956 | Adventure | In the only story not narrated by Harry Purvis, a visitor to the White Hart tells of an eccentric professor who studies the electrical circuitry of the brain, and attempts to use electrical stimulation to control animal behavior. The professor's work is discovered by a wildlife photographer, who tries to exploit it to film a giant squid. The story was also published as "The Reckless Ones". | |
| "Patent Pending" | November 1954 | Adventure | Purvis tells of a French scientist who finds a way to record and play back brain waves, allowing a person's experiences to be replayed by other people. The device's inventor successfully demonstrates the machine by capturing a gourmand's sensations when eating a many-course meal. The scientist's assistant "Georges" recognizes that other sorts of rapture can also be recorded, and finds a pornographic use for the device. | |
| "Armaments Race" | April 1954 | Adventure | Purvis tells of Hollywood special effects man Solly Blumberg, who is hired to create mock weapons as set pieces for a science-fiction serial named "Captain Zoom". Blumberg becomes involved in an arms race as he creates increasingly elaborate weapons for both the protagonist and his adversaries, until he accidentally creates a functional weapon. | |
| "Critical Mass" | February 1957 | Lilliput | This story discusses the fraught relationship between a village and a nuclear research facility located near it. On the day that the story takes place, a truck carrying a mysterious cargo has an accident, and the driver flees. The terrified villagers are about to begin an evacuation, when the narrator discovers that the cargo were merely hives of bees. | |
| "The Ultimate Melody" | February 1957 | If | The story describes the work of a physiologist who attempts to discover the connections between music and the rhythms of the electrical pulses in the brain. He believed that all "hit-tunes" were merely poor reflections of an "ultimate" melody, and he built a machine to search for this tune. By the end of the story, he succeeds, but the melody is so powerful that he becomes completely entranced. | |
| "The Pacifist" | October 1956 | Fantastic Universe | Purvis describes the construction of a supercomputer intended to solve military problems. Its designer, nicknamed "Dr. Milquetoast", is treated harshly by the program's supervising military General. In revenge, Dr. Milquetoast programs the computer so that it will answer purely theoretical or mathematical questions put to it, but when asked to solve a military problem, responds by insulting the General. | |
| "The Next Tenants" | February 1957 | Satellite Science Fiction | The protagonist discovers a "mad scientist" living on a remote Pacific island, preparing for what he feels is humanity's inevitable self-destruction. The scientist decides that termites represent the best chance for a terrestrial species to form a stable civilization, and so is training a colony of termites in the use of technology. | |
| "Moving Spirit" | | Tales from the White Hart | | |
| "The Man Who Ploughed the Sea" | June 1957 | Satellite Science Fiction | | |
| "The Reluctant Orchid" | December 1956 | Satellite Science Fiction | | |
| "Cold War" | April 1957 | Satellite Science Fiction | The story describes a scheme to discredit Florida's claim to being the sunniest state in the US. A former submarine commander is hired to ferry an ice-machine into the Atlantic Ocean and create a small iceberg there, which is expected to drift to the Florida coast and cause a negative news sensation. The submarine accidentally begins creating an iceberg near a US missile testing range, and a missile comes down near it. Upon investigation, the protagonists find that a Russian submarine is trying to appropriate the missile. | |
| "What Goes Up" | January 1956 | The Magazine of Fantasy and Science Fiction | | |
| "Sleeping Beauty" | April 1957 | Infinity Science Fiction | Purvis tells of Sigmund Snoring, who lives up to his name. Sigmund stands to inherit a fortune if he remains married at 30; to protect his future he contacts his uncle, a famous physiologist, who produces a serum that renders Sigmund unable to sleep. After some months Sigmund pleads for relief - the uncle creates an antidote, putting Sigmund into a slumber from which he never wakes. His wife eventually receives the inheritance and puts it to use holidaying. | |
| The Defenestration of Ermintrude Inch | | Tales from the White Hart | | |

== Reception ==
Galaxy reviewer Floyd C. Gale praised the collection as "as light and frothy a conglomeration of sidesplitters as it has been my good fortune to read."

== General sources ==
- Clarke, Arthur C. (1981). Tales from the White Hart. London: Del Ray. ISBN 978-0345298805.
- Tuck, Donald H. (1974). The Encyclopedia of Science Fiction and Fantasy. Chicago: Advent. p. 102. ISBN 978-0-911682-20-5.
