= Sunjammer =

- Short story by Arthur C. Clarke
- Country: United Kingdom
- Language: English
- Genre: Science fiction

Publication
- Published in: Boys' Life
- Publication date: March 1964

"Sunjammer" is a science fiction short story by British writer Arthur C. Clarke, originally published in the March 1964 issue of Boys' Life. The story has also been published under the title "The Wind from the Sun" in Clarke's 1972 collection of short stories with this title. It depicts a yacht race between solar sail spacecraft.

== Plot summary ==
John Merton, a spaceship designer, develops and promotes a lightweight spacecraft with a large area of solar sail, to be powered entirely by radiation pressure, a pressure exerted on a surface illuminated by light-particles (photons) from the Sun — this is distinct from, and much greater than, pressure developed on the surface by the solar wind from the sun. The sun-yachts start their journey in Earth's orbit, and, pushed simply by sunlight, can achieve a speed of two thousand miles an hour within a day.

The concept leads to the development of the sport of sun-yacht racing, and after several years of refining his ideas, Merton competes in what will be his final race. His hopes for victory rest on the low mass of his craft which he has made possible through advances in automation enabling him to fly it solo.

Soon, all but two of the competitors have dropped out, mainly due to damaged craft, and it is a straight race between Merton's craft and Lebedev, entered by a Russian crew from the University of Astrograd. Although the Lebedev is lagging Merton's yacht, its senior pilot delivers a surprise blow by announcing that he plans to jettison his co-pilot in an escape capsule now that the earlier, navigationally intensive part of the race has finished.

Merton responds by recalculating his expected margin of victory and realises that the race is now going to be neck-and-neck at the finish line. At this point news arrives of a massive, and potentially deadly, solar flare. The race has to be abandoned, and there is no winner, though Merton abandons his craft with its sail still fully extended in order to ensure that it will be blown into interstellar space.

== Reception ==
Donald A. Wollheim and Terry Carr selected the story for World's Best Science Fiction: 1966. When reviewing the collection, Algis Budrys praised the story as an example of "good, solid science fiction ... the kind of story which justifies the existence of science fiction as a genre."

== Planned 2014 solar sail mission ==
NASA planned to launch a solar sail technology demonstration mission titled 'Sunjammer'. The title is a reference to the story. The mission was canceled in October 2014.

== See also ==
- Mike Oldfield used the title "Sunjammer" for the fifth movement of his Tubular Bells II album. Oldfield has also used other Arthur C. Clarke titles as basis for his music, such as The Songs of Distant Earth for his The Songs of Distant Earth album.
- The Doctor Who serial Enlightenment also used a solar sail race as the basis for its plot.
- Poul Anderson, writing as Winston P. Sanders, published an apparently unrelated story under the title "Sunjammer" almost simultaneously in Analog Science Fiction / Science Fact in April 1964. It depicts a maintenance crew, servicing space-freighters powered by light sails.
- A modified version of the narrative appears in The Last Theorem, Clarke's final novel, which was co-written by Frederik Pohl. In this version the (female) protagonist is abducted by aliens during the race.

The *Explorers (Star Trek: Deep Space Nine) Episode in Season 3, Episode 22, featured Captain Sisko and his son Jake flying a reconstruction of an ancient Bajoran ship that used sails to capture the solar wind to propel it.
