= If I Forget Thee, Oh Earth =

"If I Forget Thee, O Earth"
- Short story by Arthur C. Clarke
- Country: United Kingdom
- Language: English
- Genre: Science fiction

Publication
- Published in: Future SF
- Publisher: Columbia Publications
- Publication date: September 1951

"If I Forget Thee, O Earth" is a post-apocalyptic fiction short story by English writer Arthur C. Clarke and first published in 1951 in the magazine Future SF. It was subsequently published as part of a short story collection in Expedition to Earth (1953). The title is taken from Psalm 137:5—"If I forget thee, O Jerusalem"—which consists of the writer lamenting over the destruction of Jerusalem by the Babylonian army. The themes in the story exploit the anxieties prevalent at the time regarding nuclear warfare.

The work was well received. Christian Science Monitor reviewer Peter J. Henniker-Heaton wrote: "I do not know of any short story that has moved me more than Arthur C. Clarke's 'If I Forget Thee, Oh Earth'."

== Plot summary ==
"If I Forget Thee, Oh Earth" is the story of Marvin, a child living in a future lunar colony. At the age of ten he is taken outside the complex by his father, passing the Farmlands habitation, which he loves due to the smell of life and the appearance of the plants creeping towards the sunlight through the plastic dome. They drive across the Moon's surface to see a glimpse of the Earth, glowing with lethal radiation. Marvin knows that the planet was made uninhabitable in a nuclear war. His father tells him that the colony is the last vestige of mankind, but that without a goal to strive for it too will die. The ultimate purpose of the human survivors has become to one day reclaim a cleansed Earth, using the ships which stand waiting on the lunar plain. It has taken desperate efforts to save the colony and to maintain confidence that in a far distant future mankind's birthplace can be restored.

Marvin returns with his father to resume their exile without looking back. However he realises that one day he will take his own children to view the dead Earth and give purpose to a further generation.
