= Hate (short story) =

1961 short story by Arthur C. Clarke

- Short story by Arthur C. Clarke
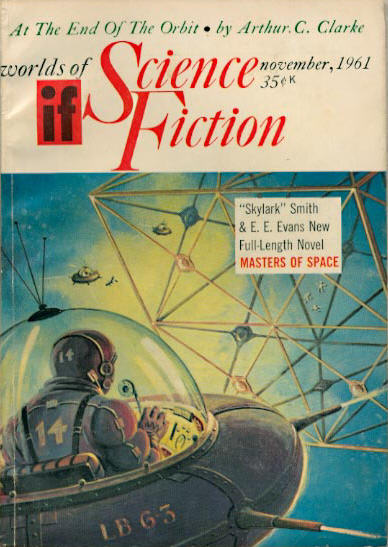
- Country: United Kingdom
- Language: English
- Genre: Science fiction

Publication
- Published in: If
- Publication date: November 1961

"Hate" is a science fiction short story by British writer Arthur C. Clarke, first published in 1961 and subsequently included in several collections of Clarke's writings, including The Collected Stories of Arthur C. Clarke. The story originated when movie producer William MacQuitty asked Clarke to write a film treatment titled The Sea and the Stars. Nothing came of the project so Clarke transformed the treatment into a short story. If magazine retitled it "At the End of Orbit" for publication but Clarke preferred his original title because it has "more punch" and it is under that title that the story has since been published.

== Plot summary ==
Set in an unspecified year, but probably a few years after 1956, the story centers on Szabo Tibor, an expatriate Hungarian, working as a pearl diver on a pearling boat between Queensland's Great Barrier Reef and Thursday Island.

When an off-course Russian space capsule crash-lands in the sea nearby, Tibor is the first to reach it. He makes contact with the still-alive cosmonaut inside, who can hear him talking but cannot respond except by knocking on the hull. Tibor, who escaped from Hungary during the 1956 uprising and whose brother was killed by invading Russians, takes revenge by delaying the salvage attempts until the capsule's air has run out and the cosmonaut is dead.

When they get the capsule to land and open the hatch, they find that the dead cosmonaut, a beautiful young girl, has managed to record Tibor's words on a tape recorder, thus branding him as a murderer.

== General and cited sources ==
- Clarke, Arthur C. The Best of Arthur C Clarke; 1956–1972. Published 1973.
- Clarke, Arthur C. The Collected Stories of Arthur C. Clarke. Tor. 2000. p. 767.
