= Dog Star (short story) =

Short story by Arthur C. Clarke

- Short story by Arthur C. Clarke
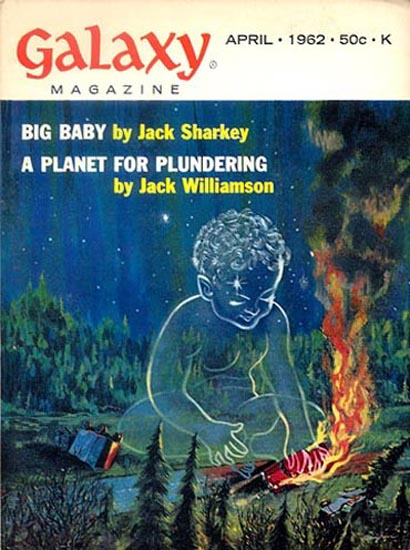
- Country: United Kingdom
- Language: English
- Genre: Science fiction

Publication
- Published in: Galaxy Science Fiction
- Publication date: April 1962

"Dog Star" is a 1962 science fiction short story by British writer Arthur C. Clarke about an astronomer and his dog, Laika. The story was also published under the title "Moondog".

== Plot summary ==
An astronomer on a Moon base awakens from a dream in which his dog, Laika, is barking loudly. The narrator feels a sense of dread strong enough to keep him awake, and he notes that if he had gone back to sleep, he would have been dead.

The narrator flashes back to when he found Laika abandoned on the side of the road years ago. His fondness for her only grew after she alerted him to an earthquake, saving his life. When it was time for him to leave Earth and continue his studies on the Moon, he gave up Laika to a fellow employee, but she lived only a month longer without him. He returns from this flashback just in time to sound the alert for a lunar quake, which, thanks to his prompt warning, kills only two of his fellow crew members.

He considers that Laika could not actually have saved him, for she was separated by 5 years time and "a barrier that no man or dog could ever bridge." It was his never-sleeping subconscious mind, sensing the tremors, that knew how to wake him, by making him dream of Laika's barking.
