= Summertime on Icarus =

- Short story by Arthur C. Clarke
- Country: United Kingdom
- Language: English
- Genre: Science fiction

Publication
- Published in: Vogue
- Publication date: June 1960

"Summertime on Icarus" is a science fiction short story by British writer Arthur C. Clarke, first published in Vogue in 1960. It was also published under the title "The Hottest Piece of Real Estate in the Solar System".

== Plot summary ==
This story tells of engineer Colin Sherrard on an expedition as part of the International Astrophysical Decade, which is intended to get a research spaceship within seventeen million miles of the Sun, shielded by the asteroid Icarus.

Travelling in his one-man mechanical pod, he suffers an accident and loses consciousness. When he comes to, he is not sure where he is - nor are the explorers in the mother ship. His pod is damaged and his communications are unreliable. Just as he is about to fry in the heat of the sun, he finds that he cannot even commit suicide as the controls do not respond. With seconds to go, he is spotted by a two-man capsule sent out by the expedition, and which is shielding him from the sun's heat in its shadow. He is rescued in the nick of time, but admits that, even on Earth, he will never enjoy summer again.

== Sources ==
- Clarke, Arthur C. The Best of Arthur C Clarke; 1956 - 1972. Published 1973
