= Patent Pending (short story) =

Short story by Arthur C. Clarke

- Short story by Arthur C. Clarke
- Country: United Kingdom
- Language: English
- Genres: Science fiction, fantasy

Publication
- Published in: Adventure
- Publisher: Popular Publications
- Publication date: November 1954

Chronology
- Series: Tales from the White Hart
Big Game Hunt	Armaments Race

"Patent Pending" is a science fiction short story by English writer Arthur C. Clarke, first published in 1954. It was also published as "The Invention". It later appeared in his collection Tales from the White Hart.

"Patent Pending" is a frame story, purporting to recount a scientific tall tale told by a certain Harry Purvis at the (fictional) "White Hart" pub in London sometime in the 1950s, during a discussion of literary censorship (at the expense of the censors).

A review of Tales from the White Hart in Fantastic Universe called attention to "Patent Pending" as an example of stories in the collection that had a "haunting gleam of plausibility", which, according to the reviewer, gave the collection a "peculiar charm".

== Plot summary ==
The story within a story tells of a French scientist who successfully finds a way to record and play back brain waves, allowing experiences to be replayed by other people.

After the device's inventor proves the fidelity of the recordings by capturing a well known gourmet's rapturous appreciation of a cordon bleu meal, and playing it back, reproducing every fine gustatory sensation, his assistant "Georges" recognizes that other sorts of rapture can also be recorded, finding a pornographic use for the device.

Starting with amateur recordings of his own amorous play with his mistress, Georges progressed to a more sophisticated work involving a male-female pair of prostitutes whose technique and physical attributes were more up to the job (In telling the story to the audience at the White Hart, Harry Purvis emphasized that the pair were not from the Place Pigalle, because the assistant's budget did not extend to it - "He did not go anywhere near the Place Pigalle, because that was full of Americans and prices were accordingly exorbitant").

The resulting recordings were, indeed, every bit as faithful to the young, fit couple's raptures as the gourmet's, and Georges was delighted - entirely too delighted. Eventually, Georges' fascination with the recording of that professional performance takes over his life, Georges's neglected mistress takes his life for the first known act of electronic infidelity. After the police investigation ended, a venture to make the recording process commercial (with city officials among the investors) supposedly went underway, according to Purvis (as he ended the story).
