= Into the Comet =

- Short story by Arthur C. Clarke
- Country: United Kingdom
- Language: English
- Genre: Science fiction

Publication
- Published in: The Magazine of Fantasy and Science Fiction
- Publication type: Magazine
- Publication date: October 1960

"Into the Comet" is a science fiction short story by British writer Arthur C. Clarke. It was originally published in Fantasy & Science Fiction in October 1960. It is one of several stories by many science fiction authors in which problems are solved by reverting to 'primitive' technology. The story was also published as "Inside the Comet".

== Plot summary ==
The plot concerns a journey by a spaceship to enter through the layers of gas surrounding a comet and observe the nucleus at close range. This part of the mission is successful, but the ship's computer develops a malfunction and they are unable to compute the required orbit to escape the comet. The ionised gas in the comet's tail prevents any radio communication with Earth.

George Takeo Pickett, a part-Japanese journalist on board the ship, recalls the use of the abacus used by his granduncle, a bank teller, and persuades the ship's astronomer to give it a try. Once convinced, the astronomer creates a production line of the crew, using abaci to carry out the calculations that the computer would normally do.

The procedure is successful and an orbit is calculated to bring the ship within radio range of Earth.
