= Death and the Senator =

- Short story by Arthur C. Clarke
- Country: United Kingdom
- Language: English
- Genre: Science fiction

Publication
- Published in: Analog Science Fiction and Fact
- Publication date: May 1961

"Death and the Senator" is a science fiction short story by British writer Arthur C. Clarke. It was originally published in 1961 and has since been included in several collections of Clarke's writings.

== Plot summary ==
Set in an unspecified year, some time before 1976, the story tells of Martin Steelman, an American senator and potential Presidential candidate. As a member of a Senate committee, he has used his influence and rhetoric to refuse funding for an astrobiology project.

Some years later, he learns that he has a potentially fatal cardiac condition. Thereupon, he hears from one of the space scientists, whose project he helped to kill, that the USSR is experimenting with medical treatment under zero gravity conditions in a space station in Earth orbit. Although Steelman is offered a place on the treatment programme, which is highly experimental, he gives it up on seeing a young couple also waiting to be treated.

Back in Washington, D.C., he spends his last months with his family, for which he had always been too busy with politics, and finds happiness in the role of a loving grandfather. While he is sitting on a bench and contemplating his fate, death comes quietly to him.

== Background ==
The story is widely understood to be a rebuke of U.S. Senator William Proxmire's criticism of space exploration.
