= Rescue Party =

1946 science fiction short story by Arthur C. Clarke

"Rescue Party" is a science fiction short story by English writer Arthur C. Clarke, first published in Astounding Science Fiction in May 1946. It was the first story that he sold, though not the first one published. It was republished in Clarke's second collection, Reach for Tomorrow (1956), and also appears in The Collected Stories of Arthur C. Clarke (2001).

== Plot summary ==
Aliens, aware that the Sun will explode very soon, arrive to save as many humans and as much of their culture as possible. Normally the galactic civilizations conduct surveys of planets every million years for new species, but the human race did not exist the previous time the Earth was checked—nearly four hundred thousand years before. However, radio signals had been detected at a planet 200 light years away, indicating intelligent life had arisen.

To the aliens' surprise, the planet seems to be empty of intelligent life, except for the remnants of a civilization. While the aliens explore the old cities, a comment is made that it is typical for species to take thousands of years to go from radio transmission to space travel.

During their exploration of the Earth, the aliens find a communication tower transmitting what is unfolding into what looks like empty space. They follow the beam and find an enormous fleet of ships. The aliens, equipped with faster-than-light ships, are amazed that humans have dared to cross interstellar space in sublight ships only 200 years after inventing radio. Humans do not possess faster-than-light ships, but have built generational starships in the hope that their descendants will one day find a new home.

The aliens jokingly wonder if they should be worried for themselves, given the humans' rapid advancement and apparent determination; twenty years later, the comment is no longer considered funny.

== Reception ==
Arthur C. Clarke spoke of "Rescue Party" in a foreword to the story, republished in The Sentinel, a book of short stories, in 1983:

"Rescue Party," written in March 1945, while I was still in the Royal Air Force, was the first story I sold to the legendary John W. Campbell, Jr., editor of Astounding Science Fiction. It was not, however, the first of my stories he published; "Loophole" (April 1946) beat it by a month. I don't believe I've reread it since its original appearance, and I refuse to do so now—for fear of discovering how little I have improved in almost four decades. Those who claim that it's their favorite story get a cooler and cooler reception over the passing years.

== See also ==
- "The Fermi Paradox Is Our Business Model", 2010 Charlie Jane Anders story in which aliens arriving at post-nuclear holocaust Earth are surprised that some humans have developed the technology to survive
