= The Sentinel (short story) =

1951 short story by Arthur C. Clarke

- Short story by Arthur C. Clarke
- First appearance, in 10 Story Fantasy
- Country: United Kingdom
- Language: English
- Genre: Science fiction

Publication
- Published in: 10 Story Fantasy
- Publisher: Avon Periodicals
- Publication date: Spring 1951

"The Sentinel" is a science fiction short story by British author Arthur C. Clarke, written in 1948 and first published in 1951 in 10 Story Fantasy as "Sentinel of Eternity". Its plot and ideas influenced the development of the 1968 film 2001: A Space Odyssey and its corresponding novel.

== Publication history ==
"The Sentinel" was written in 1948 for a BBC competition in which it failed to place. It was first published in the magazine 10 Story Fantasy, in the Spring 1951 issue, under the title "Sentinel of Eternity". Despite the story's initial failure, it ultimately changed the course of Clarke's career. It appears in the short story collections Expedition to Earth (1953), The Nine Billion Names of God (1967), and The Sentinel (1982), as well as in The Lost Worlds of 2001 (1972).

== Plot ==
The story is set in 1996 (at the time of writing, several decades in the future). The narrator, Wilson, is a veteran selenologist on an expedition to explore the lunar surface. He comes across a mysterious pyramidal structure, surrounded by an "invisible shield" which blocks all attempts to approach. The structure is found to have been placed on the Moon several billion years earlier, and it is not the product of any terrestrial or lunar civilization.

Twenty years pass before the invisible shield is successfully breached, using atomic energy. The structure is destroyed in the process, and its fragments are found to be incomprehensible, being far more advanced than any human technology. Wilson realizes that the structure was created and placed on the Moon by technologically advanced aliens from outside the Solar System.

Wilson presents his guess as to the structure's purpose: it was a "sentinel" which for billions of years had been transmitting signals into space. The sentinel's destruction—which humans could only accomplish by mastering space travel and atomic energy—will have caused its signals to cease, thereby alerting its creators to intelligent life having discovered it. Wilson expresses his belief that the aliens will soon be "turning their gaze upon the Earth".

== Reception ==
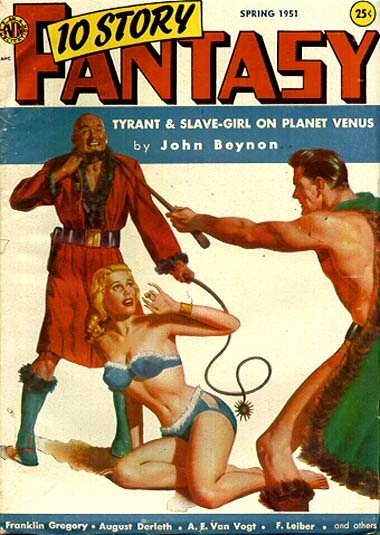
First appearance in 10 Story Fantasy, 1951.

Algis Budrys found "The Sentinel" to be infuriating, saying that "one can raise a formidable reputation for profundity by repeating, over and over again, that the universe is wide and man is very small... while our instruments show that the universe is wide, they are our instruments and we managed somehow to build them. There is no evidence whatsoever that Man is that goddamned small."

Singer-songwriter Roger McGuinn wrote and performed the song "Space Odyssey", whose subject is “The Sentinel”. It is the closing track on the 1968 album by the Byrds, The Notorious Byrd Brothers, and consists mostly of a Moog synthesizer and minimal instrumental accompaniment. The vocals are delivered in a "sea shanty" cadence.

== Influence on 2001: A Space Odyssey ==
The story's plot and ideas were a significant influence on the development of the 1968 film 2001: A Space Odyssey by Stanley Kubrick and on the novel. Clarke and Kubrick adapted the short story and fused it with many other concepts. Clarke later expressed impatience with "The Sentinel" being described as the basis for the film:

I am continually annoyed by careless references to "The Sentinel" as "the story on which 2001 is based"; it bears about as much relation to the movie as an acorn to the resultant full-grown oak. (Considerably less, in fact, because ideas from several other stories were also incorporated.) Even the elements that Stanley Kubrick and I did actually use were considerably modified. Thus the 'glittering, roughly pyramidal structure... set in the rock like a gigantic, many-faceted jewel' became—after several modifications—the famous black monolith. And the locale was moved from the Mare Crisium to the most spectacular of all lunar craters, Tycho—easily visible to the naked eye from Earth at Full Moon.

== See also ==
- "Encounter in the Dawn", a 1953 short story by Clarke
