= List of science fiction short stories =

This is a non-comprehensive list of short stories with significant science fiction elements.

Title	Author	First published in	Publication year	Notes
2 B R 0 2 B	Kurt Vonnegut	Worlds of If Science Fiction	1962	
2430 A.D.	Isaac Asimov	Think (IBM magazine)	1970	
A Boy's Best Friend	Isaac Asimov	Boy's Life	1975	
A Braver Thing	Charles Sheffield	Asimov's Science Fiction	1990	
A Cabin on the Coast	Gene Wolfe	The Magazine of Fantasy & Science Fiction	1984	
A Can of Paint	A. E. van Vogt	Analog Science Fiction	1944	
A Clean Escape	John Kessel	Asimov's Science Fiction	1985	
A Colder War	Charles Stross	Spectrum SF	2000	
A Dream of Armageddon	H. G. Wells	Black and White	1901	
A Little Something for Us Tempunauts	Philip K. Dick	Final Stage	1975	
A Logic Named Joe	Murray Leinster	Analog Science Fiction	1946	
A Loint of Paw	Isaac Asimov	The Magazine of Fantasy & Science Fiction	1957	
A Man of the People	Chinua Achebe	Heinemann	1966	
A Martian Odyssey	Stanley G. Weinbaum	Wonder Stories	1934	
A Martian Odyssey and Others	Stanley G. Weinbaum	Fantasy Press	1949	
A Pail of Air	Fritz Leiber	Galaxy Magazine	1951	
A Series of Steaks	Vina Jie-Min Prasad	Clarkesworld	2017	
A Slice at a Time	Karen Traviss	Asimov's Science Fiction	2002	
A Sound of Thunder	Ray Bradbury	Collier's	1952	
A Statue for Father	Isaac Asimov	Satellite Science Fiction	1959	
A Study in Emerald	Neil Gaiman	Shadows Over Baker Street	2003	
A Tenderfoot in Space	Robert A. Heinlein	Boys' Life	1958	
A Thousand Deaths (London short story)	Jack London		1899	
A Toy for Juliette	Robert Bloch	Dangerous Visions	1967	
A Walk in the Sun (short story)	Geoffrey A. Landis	Asimov's Science Fiction	1991	
A Work of Art	James Blish	Science Fiction Stories	1956	
A Year in the Linear City	Paul Di Filippo		2002	
All Summer in a Day	Ray Bradbury	The Magazine of Fantasy & Science Fiction	1954	
All You Zombies	Robert A. Heinlein	The Magazine of Fantasy and Science Fiction	1959	
Allamagoosa	Eric Frank Russell	Analog Science Fiction	1955	
And I Awoke and Found Me Here on the Cold Hill's Side	James Tiptree Jr.	The Magazine of Fantasy & Science Fiction	1972	
Arena (short story)	Fredric Brown	Analog Science Fiction	1944	
Armaments Race	Arthur C. Clarke	Adventure	1954	
Arvies	Adam-Troy Castro	Lightspeed Magazine	2010	
Auto-da-Fé (short story)	Roger Zelazny	Dangerous Visions	1967	
Azathoth (short story)	H. P. Lovecraft	Leaves	1938	
Baby, You Were Great	Kate Wilhelm	Orbit 2	1968	
Backstage Lensman	Randall Garrett	Analog Science Fiction	1978	
Be My Guest	Damon Knight	Fantastic Universe	1958	
Beachworld	Stephen King	Weird Tales	1984	
Bicycle Repairman	Bruce Sterling	Intersections: The Sycamore Hill Anthology	1996	
Big Game Hunt	Arthur C. Clarke	Adventure	1956	
Birth of a Notion (short story)	Isaac Asimov	Amazing Stories	1976	
Black Box	Jennifer Egan	Twitter account of The New Yorker	2012	
Black Destroyer	A. E. van Vogt	Analog Science Fiction	1939	
Black Projects, White Knights	Kage Baker	Golden Gryphon Press	2002	
Black Sheep Astray	Mack Reynolds	Astounding: The John W. Campbell Memorial Anthology	1973	
Blank!	Isaac Asimov	Infinity Science Fiction	1957	
BLIT	David Langford	Interzone	1988	
Breakfast at Twilight	Philip K. Dick	Amazing Stories	1954	
Bridesicle	Will McIntosh	Asimov's Science Fiction	2009	
Buffalo Gals, Won't You Come Out Tonight	Ursula K. Le Guin	The Magazine of Fantasy and Science Fiction	1987	
Burning Chrome	William Gibson	Omni	1982	
But Who Can Replace a Man?	Brian Aldiss		1965	
Buy Jupiter	Isaac Asimov	Venture Science Fiction Magazine	1958	
By His Bootstraps	Robert A. Heinlein	Analog Science Fiction	1941	
Byomjatrir Diary	Satyajit Ray	Sandesh	1965	
Cal	Isaac Asimov	Gold	1991	
Call Me Joe	Poul Anderson	Astounding Science Fiction	1957	
Captive Market (short story)	Philip K. Dick	If Magazine	1955	
Cassandra (short story)	C. J. Cherryh	The Magazine of Fantasy & Science Fiction	1978	
Cat Pictures Please	Naomi Kritzer	Clarkesworld	2015	
Chronopolis	J. G. Ballard		1960	
Cold War (short story)	Arthur C. Clarke	Satellite Science Fiction	1957	
Colliding Branes	Rudy Rucker	Asimov's Science Fiction	2009	
Collision Orbit	Jack Williamson	Analog Science Fiction	1942	
Colony (short story)	Philip K. Dick	Galaxy	1953	
Columbus Was a Dope	Robert A. Heinlein	Startling Stories	1947	
Coming Attraction	Fritz Leiber	Galaxy Science Fiction	1950	
Coming of Age in Karhide	Ursula K. Le Guin	New Legends	1995	
Common Time	James Blish	Science Fiction Quarterly	1953	
Covenant	Elizabeth Bear	Hieroglyph	2014	
Coventry (short story)	Robert A. Heinlein	Analog Science Fiction	1940	
Critical Factor	Hal Clement	Star Science Fiction Stories No.2	1953	
Critical Mass (Arthur C. Clarke short story)	Arthur C. Clarke	Lilliput	1949	
Crouch End (short story)	Stephen King	Cthulhu Mythos anthology	1980	
Crusade (short story)	Arthur C. Clarke	The Wind from the Sun	1968	
Dagon (short story)	H. P. Lovecraft	The Vagrant	1919	
Dance of the Yellow-Breasted Luddites	William Shunn	Tor Books	2000	
Dancer in the Dark (short story)	David Gerrold	The Magazine of Fantasy & Science Fiction	2004	
Dark They Were, and Golden-Eyed	Ray Bradbury	Thrilling Wonder Stories	1949	
Darth Maul: Saboteur	James Luceno	Del Rey Books	2001	
Darwinian Pool Room	Isaac Asimov	Galaxy Science Fiction	1950	
Day of the Hunters	Isaac Asimov	Future Combined with Science Fiction Stories	1950	
Deadline	Cleve Cartmill	Analog Science Fiction	1944	
Dear Pen Pal	A. E. van Vogt	The Arkham Sampler	1949	
Death by Ecstasy	Larry Niven	Galaxy	1969	
Delilah and the Space Rigger	Robert A. Heinlein	Blue Book	1949	
Despoilers of the Golden Empire	Randall Garrett	Analog Science Fiction	1959	
Destination Moon (short story)	Robert A. Heinlein	Short Stories	1950	
Destination: Universe!	A. E. van Vogt		1952	
Devil You Don't Know	Dean Ing	Analog Science Fiction	1978	
Dinosaurs (short story)	Walter Jon Williams	Asimov's Science Fiction	1987	
Divide and Rule (short story)	L. Sprague de Camp	Unknown (magazine)	1939	
Divided We Fall	Raymond F. Jones	Amazing Stories	1950	
Division by Zero (story)	Ted Chiang	Full Spectrum 3	1991	
Dog Star (short story)	Arthur C. Clarke	Galaxy Science Fiction	1962	
Dogfight (short story)	Michael Swanwick	Omni	1985	
Dr. Ox's Experiment	Jules Verne		1872	
Dreaming Is a Private Thing	Isaac Asimov	The Magazine of Fantasy and Science Fiction	1955	
Drode's Equations	Richard Grant	The Ascent of Wonder: The Evolution of Hard SF	1981	
Dulcie and Decorum	Damon Knight	Galaxy Science Fiction	1955	
Dune short stories	Frank Herbert, Brian Herbert and Kevin J. Anderson	The Road to Dune	2005	
E for Effort	T. L. Sherred	Analog Science Fiction	1947	
Earthlight (short story)	Arthur C. Clarke	Thrilling Wonder Stories	1951	
Eight Episodes	Robert Reed	Asimov's Science Fiction	2006	
Elemental (story)	Geoffrey A. Landis	Analog Science Fiction	1984	
Elsewhen	Robert A. Heinlein	Analog Science Fiction	1941	
Encounter in the Dawn	Arthur C. Clarke	Amazing Stories	1953	
Enemy Mine	Barry B. Longyear	Asimov's Science Fiction	1979	
EPICAC	Kurt Vonnegut	Welcome to the Monkey House	1950	
Eutopia (short story)	Poul Anderson	Dangerous Visions	1967	
Even the Queen	Connie Willis	Asimov's Science Fiction	1992	
Everest (short story)	Isaac Asimov	Universe Science Fiction	1953	
Evil Robot Monkey	Mary Robinette Kowal	The Solaris Book of New Science Fiction: Volume 2	2008	
Exhalation (short story)	Ted Chiang	Eclipse 2: New Science Fiction and Fantasy	2008	
Exhibit Piece	Philip K. Dick		1954	
Exile of the Eons	Arthur C. Clarke	Super Science Stories	1950	
Exile to Hell	Isaac Asimov	Analog Science Fiction	1968	
Expendable (short story)	Philip K. Dick	The Magazine of Fantasy and Science Fiction	1953	
Exploration Team	Murray Leinster	Analog Science Fiction	1956	
Extempore (short story)	Damon Knight	Infinity Science Fiction	1956	
Eye for Eye	Orson Scott Card	Asimov's Science Fiction	1987	
Eyes Do More Than See	Isaac Asimov	The Magazine of Fantasy and Science Fiction	1965	
Fair Game (short story)	Philip K. Dick	If Magazine	1959	
Falling Onto Mars	Geoffrey A. Landis	Analog Science Fiction	2002	
Far Centaurus	A. E. van Vogt	Analog Science Fiction	1944	
Farewell to the Master	Harry Bates	Analog Science Fiction	1940	
Feghoot				
Fermi and Frost	Frederik Pohl	Asimov's Science Fiction	1985	
Finis	Frank Lillie Pollock	The Argosy	1906	
Fire Watch (short story)	Connie Willis	Asimov's Science Fiction	1982	
First Contact (short story)	Murray Leinster	Analog Science Fiction	1945	
First Law	Isaac Asimov	Fantastic Universe	1956	
Flat Diane	Daniel Abraham	The Magazine of Fantasy & Science Fiction	2004	
Flowers for Algernon	Daniel Keyes	The Washington Post	1959	
For a Breath I Tarry	Roger Zelazny		1966	
Fountain of Age	Nancy Kress	Asimov's Science Fiction	2007	
Fragments of a Hologram Rose	William Gibson	Unearth3	1977	
Free Men	Robert A. Heinlein	The Worlds of Robert A. Heinlein	1966	
From Babel's Fall'n Glory We Fled	Michael Swanwick	Asimov's Science Fiction	2008	
Frost and Fire	Ray Bradbury	Planet Stories	1946	
Gateway to Strangeness	Jack Vance	Amazing Stories	1962	
Gene Hive	Brian Aldiss	Nebula Science Fiction	1958	
Genius of the Species	Reginald Bretnor	9 Tales of Space and Time	1954	
Gentlemen, Be Seated!	Robert A. Heinlein	Argosy	1948	
Georgia on My Mind (novelette)	Charles Sheffield	Analog Science Fiction	1993	
Getting Real (short story)	Harry Turtledove	Asimov's Science Fiction	2009	
Getting to Know You	David Marusek	Asimov's Science Fiction	1998	
Ghostweight	Yoon Ha Lee	Clarkesworld Magazine	2011	
Giant Killer	A. Bertram Chandler	Analog Science Fiction	1945	
Gilgamesh in the Outback	Robert Silverberg	Asimov's Science Fiction	1986	
Goat Song (novelette)	Poul Anderson	The Magazine of Fantasy and Science Fiction	1972	
Gods and Pawns	Kage Baker	Tor Books	2007	
Gold (short story)	Isaac Asimov	Analog Science Fiction	1991	
Good Night, Moon	Bruce Sterling	Tor.com	2010	
Gramma (short story)	Stephen King	Weirdbook (magazine)	1984	
Great Science Fiction Stories About the Moon			1967	anthology
Great Work of Time	John Crowley	Novelty (book)	1989	
Grotto of the Dancing Deer	Clifford D. Simak	Analog Science Fiction	1980	
Hallucination (short story)	Isaac Asimov	Boy's Life	1985	
Hammer's Slammers	David Drake	Ace Books	1979	
Happy Ending (short story)	Henry Kuttner	Thrilling Wonder Stories	1948	
Harrison Bergeron	Kurt Vonnegut	The Magazine of Fantasy and Science Fiction	1961	
He Walked Around the Horses	H. Beam Piper	Analog Science Fiction	1948	
Helix the Cat	Theodore Sturgeon	Astounding: The John W Campbell Memorial Anthology	1973	first published in 1973, although written in 1939 or 1940
Hell-Fire (story)	Isaac Asimov	Fantastic Universe	1956	
Henry James, This One's for You	Jack McDevitt	Subterranean Magazine	2005	
Herbert West–Reanimator	H. P. Lovecraft	Home Brew	1922	
Here There Be Tygers	Ray Bradbury	New Tales of Space and Time	1951	
Hinterlands (short story)	William Gibson	Omni	1981	
History of the Necronomicon	H. P. Lovecraft		1938	
Home Delivery	Stephen King	Book of the Dead	1989	
Honeymoon in Hell	Fredric Brown	Bantam Books	1958	
Houston, Houston, Do You Read?	James Tiptree Jr.	Aurora: Beyond Equality (anthology)	1976	
How to Talk to Girls at Parties	Neil Gaiman	Fragile Things	2006	
How We Went to Mars	Arthur C. Clarke	Amateur Science Stories	1938	
How's the Night Life on Cissalda?	Harlan Ellison	Chrysalis, anthology published by Zebra Books	1977	
Huddling Place	Clifford D. Simak	Analog Science Fiction	1944	
Human Is	Philip K. Dick	Startling Stories	1955	
I Am the Doorway	Stephen King	Night Shift	1978	
I Have No Mouth, and I Must Scream	Harlan Ellison	IF: Worlds of Science Fiction	1967	
I Hope I Shall Arrive Soon	Philip K. Dick	Playboy	1980	
I Know What You Need	Stephen King	Night Shift	1978	
I'm in Marsport Without Hilda	Isaac Asimov	Venture	1957	
I, Cthulhu	Neil Gaiman		2012	
I, Robot	Isaac Asimov	Gnome Press	1950	
I, Robot (short story)	Eando Binder	Amazing Stories	1939	
Idiot Stick	Damon Knight	Star Science Fiction	1958	
If All Men Were Brothers, Would You Let One Marry Your Sister?	Theodore Sturgeon	Dangerous Visions	1967	
If I Forget Thee, Oh Earth	Arthur C. Clarke	Future SF	1951	
If There Were No Benny Cemoli	Philip K. Dick	Galaxy Magazine	1963	
Impossible Dreams	Tim Pratt	Asimov's Science Fiction	2006	
Impostor (short story)	Philip K. Dick	Analog Science Fiction	1953	
In Darkness Waiting	Stephen Leigh	Asimov's Science Fiction	1977	
In the Pound, Near Breaktime	Kent Brewster	Tomorrow Speculative Fiction	1995	
In the Walls of Eryx	H. P. Lovecraft and Kenneth J. Sterling	Weird Tales	1939	
In the Year 2889	Jules Verne and Michel Verne		1889	
Inclination (novella)	William Shunn	Asimov's Science Fiction	2006	
Inertia (short story)	Nancy Kress	Analog Science Fiction	1990	
Inheritance (short story)	Arthur C. Clarke	New Worlds	1947	
Internal Combustion (short story)	L. Sprague de Camp	Infinity Science Fiction	1956	
Isaac Asimov Presents The Great SF Stories 1 (1939)	edited by Isaac Asimov and Martin H. Greenberg		1979	
Isaac Asimov Presents The Great SF Stories 2 (1940)	edited by Isaac Asimov and Martin H. Greenberg,		1979	
It's a Good Life	Jerome Bixby	Star Science Fiction Stories No.2	1953	
It's Great to Be Back!	Robert A. Heinlein		1947	
Jack-in-the-Box (short story)	Ray Bradbury	Dark Carnival	1947	
Jerry Was a Man	Robert A. Heinlein		1947	
Jerusalem's Lot	Stephen King	Night Shift	1978	
Jipi and the Paranoid Chip	Neal Stephenson	Forbes	1997	
Judas (short story)	John Brunner	Dangerous Visions	1967	
Judgment Day (short story)	L. Sprague de Camp	Analog Science Fiction	1955	
Ker-Plop	Ted Reynolds		1979	
Kid Stuff	Isaac Asimov	Beyond Fantasy Fiction	1953	
Killdozer! (short story)	Theodore Sturgeon	Analog Science Fiction	1944	
Kin (short story)	Bruce McAllister	Asimov's Science Fiction	2006	
King Solomon's Ring (short story)	Roger Zelazny	Fantastic: Stories of Imagination	1963	
Knock	Fredric Brown	Thrilling Wonder Stories	1948	
Lambing Season	Molly Gloss	Asimov's Science Fiction	2002	
Land of the Great Horses	R. A. Lafferty	Dangerous Visions	1967	
Last Contact	Stephen Baxter		2007	
Last Enemy	H. Beam Piper	Analog Science Fiction	1950	
Lecture Demonstration	Hal Clement	Astounding: The John W Campbell Memorial Anthology	1973	
Left to Right	Isaac Asimov	Gold	1995	
Legions in Time	Michael Swanwick	Asimov's Science Fiction	2003	
Lest Darkness Fall and Related Stories	L. Sprague de Camp	Phoenix Pick	2011	
Lest We Remember	Isaac Asimov	Asimov's Science Fiction	1982	
Let There Be Light (Clarke short story)	Arthur C. Clarke	Playboy	1957	
Let There Be Light (Heinlein short story)	Robert A. Heinlein	Super Science Stories	1940	
Let's Go to Golgotha!	Garry Kilworth	The Sunday Times	1957	
Life-Line	Robert A. Heinlein	Analog Science Fiction	1939	
Light of Other Days	Bob Shaw	Analog Science Fiction	1966	
Lipidleggin'	F. Paul Wilson	Asimov's Science Fiction	1978	
Little Brother (short story)	Walter Mosley	Futureland: Nine Stories of an Imminent World	2001	
Live Without a Net (book)	Lou Anders		2003	
Living Space	Isaac Asimov	Science Fiction	1956	
Lorelei at Storyville West	Sherwood Springer	Asimov's Science Fiction	1977	
Lost Dorsai	Gordon R. Dickson	Ace Books	1980	
Machine Made	J. T. McIntosh	New Worlds	1951	
Macs (short story)	Terry Bisson	The Magazine of Fantasy & Science Fiction	1999	
Marionettes, Inc.	Ray Bradbury	Startling Stories	1949	
Mars Is Heaven!	Ray Bradbury	Planet Stories	1948	
Masks (short story)	Damon Knight	Playboy	1968	
Matters Arising from the Identification of the Body	Simon Petrie		2017	
Maureen Birnbaum, Barbarian Swordsperson	George Alec Effinger		1993	
May Be Some Time	Brenda Clough	Analog Science Fiction	2001	
Medusa's Coil	H. P. Lovecraft and Zealia Bishop	Weird Tales	1939	
Melancholy Elephants	Spider Robinson		1982	
Memorare (novella)	Gene Wolfe	The Magazine of Fantasy & Science Fiction	2007	
Memory (short story)	H. P. Lovecraft	The National Amateur	1923	
Men Without Bones	Gerald Kersh	Esquire	1954	
Merlusine	Lucy Sussex	The Horns of Elfland	1997	
Mimsy Were the Borogoves	Lewis Padgett	Analog Science Fiction	1943	
Misfit	Robert A. Heinlein	Analog Science Fiction	1939	
Morning Child	Gardner Dozois		1984	
Mortimer Gray's History of Death	Brian Stableford	Asimov's Science Fiction	1995	
Movement	Nancy Fulda	Asimov's Science Fiction	2007	
Moving Spirit	Arthur C. Clarke	Tales from the White Hart	1957	
Moxon's Master	Ambrose Bierce	The San Francisco Examiner	1899	
Mozart in Mirrorshades	Lewis Shiner and Bruce Sterling	Omni	1985	
Mr F. is Mr F.	J. G. Ballard	Science Fantasy	1961	
Mr. Boy	James Patrick Kelly	Asimov's Science Fiction	1990	
MS Fnd in a Lbry	Hal Draper	The Magazine of Fantasy and Science Fiction	1961	
My Object All Sublime	Poul Anderson	The Magazine of Fantasy and Science Fiction	1961	
My Son, the Physicist	Isaac Asimov	Scientific American	1962	
Myths of the Near Future	J. G. Ballard	Jonathan Cape	1982	
Nanny (short story)	Philip K. Dick	Startling Stories	1955	
Neanderthal Planet	Brian W. Aldiss		1959	
Neil Gaiman's Only the End of the World Again	Neil Gaiman	Oni Double Feature	1998	
Neutron Star (short story collection)	Larry Niven	If and Galaxy Science Fiction	1966	
Nightfall_(Asimov_novelette_and_novel)	Isaac Asimov	Astounding Science Fiction	1941	
Nightwings (novella)	Robert Silverberg	Galaxy Magazine	1968	
Nine Lives (novelette)	Ursula K. Le Guin	Playboy	1969	
Nirvana High	Eileen Gunn and Leslie What	Stable Strategies and Others	2004	
No Love Lost (book)	Alice Munro		2003	
Nobody Bothers Gus	Algis Budrys	Analog Science Fiction	1955	
None So Blind	Joe Haldeman	Asimov's Science Fiction	1994	
Not with a Bang	Damon Knight	The Magazine of Fantasy and Science Fiction	1949	
Notebook Found in a Deserted House	Robert Bloch	Weird Tales	1951	
Nothing But Ice	Dmitri Bilenkin		1974	
Nothing Ever Happens on the Moon	Robert A. Heinlein	Boys' Life	1949	
Now: Zero	J. G. Ballard	The Complete Short Stories of J. G. Ballard: Volume 1	1959	
Nyarlathotep (short story)	H. P. Lovecraft	The United Amateur	1920	
Old Hundredth (short story)	Brian Aldiss	Airs of the Earth	1963	
Old MacDonald Had a Farm (short story)	Mike Resnick	Asimov's Science Fiction	2001	
Old Man in New World	Olaf Stapledon		1994	
Old Music and the Slave Women	Ursula K. Le Guin	Far Horizons	1999	
Omnilingual	H. Beam Piper	Analog Science Fiction	1957	
Or All the Seas with Oysters	Avram Davidson	Galaxy Science Fiction	1958	
Ordeal in Space	Robert A. Heinlein	Town & Country	1948	
Orphans of the Helix	Dan Simmons	Far Horizons	1999	
Orpheus with Clay Feet	Philip K. Dick	Escapade	1964	
Our Fair City	Robert A. Heinlein	Weird Tales	1949	
Out in the Garden	Philip K. Dick	Fantasy Fiction	1953	
Paladin of the Lost Hour	Harlan Ellison		1984	
Paying It Forward	Michael A. Burstein	Analog Science Fiction	2003	
Permafrost (story)	Roger Zelazny	Omni	1986	
Piper in the Woods	Philip K. Dick	Imagination	1953	
Plato's Dream	Voltaire		1756	
Point of View (short story)	Isaac Asimov	Boys' Life	1975	
Polaris (short story)	H.P. Lovecraft	Philosopher	1920	
Polly Plus	Randall Garrett	Asimov's Science Fiction	1978	
Poor Daddy	Robert A. Heinlein	Calling All Girls	1949	
Poor Dionis	Mihai Eminescu		1872	
Prize Ship	Philip K. Dick	Thrilling Wonder Stories	1954	
Professor Shonkur Kandokarkhana	Satyajit Ray		1970	
Project Nightmare	Robert A. Heinlein	Amazing Stories	1953	
Proxima Centauri (short story)	Murray Leinster	Street & Smith	1935	
Psi-man Heal My Child!	Philip K. Dick	Imaginative Tales	1955	
Queen of the Black Coast	Robert E. Howard	Weird Tales	1934	
Quicker Than the Eye	Ray Bradbury	Avon Books	1996	
Rachel in Love	Pat Murphy		1985	
Radiant Doors	Michael Swanwick	Asimov's Science Fiction	1998	
Rat (short story)	James Patrick Kelly	Magazine of Fantasy and Science Fiction	1986	
Recall Mechanism	Philip K. Dick		1959	
Red Star, Winter Orbit	William Gibson	Omni	1983	
Replacements (short story)	Lisa Tuttle		1992	
Requiem (short story)	Robert A Heinlein	Analog Science Fiction	1940	
Ring Around the Sun	Isaac Asimov	Future Fiction	1940	
Ripples in the Dirac Sea	Geoffrey A. Landis	Asimov's Science Fiction	1988	
Rivers of Time	L. Sprague de Camp	Baen Books	1993	
Rogue Farm	Charles Stross		2003	
Rome, Sweet Rome	James Erwin	self-published on Reddit	2011	
Roverandom	J. R. R. Tolkien		1998	submitted for publication in 1937
Rule 18	Clifford D. Simak	Analog Science Fiction	1938	
Salvador (short story)	Lucius Shepard	The Magazine of Fantasy & Science Fiction	1984	
Scanners Live in Vain	Cordwainer Smith	Fantasy Book	1950	
Searchlight (short story)	Robert A Heinlein		1962	
Selam Professor Shonku	Satyajit Ray		1995	
Selkie Stories Are for Losers	Sofia Samatar	Strange Horizons	2013	
Sergeant Chip	Bradley Denton	The Magazine of Fantasy & Science Fiction	2004	
Service Call	Philip K. Dick	Science Fiction Stories	1955	
Seven Views of Olduvai Gorge	Mike Resnick	The Magazine of Fantasy & Science Fiction	1994	
Sex and/or Mr. Morrison	Carol Emshwiller	Dangerous Visions	1967	
Shabash Professor Shonku	Satyajit Ray		1974	
Shadows over Innsmouth	Stephen Jones		1994	
Shah Guido G.	Isaac Asimov	Marvel Science Fiction	1951	
Shall the Dust Praise Thee?	Damon Knight	Dangerous Visions	1967	
Shambleau	C. L. Moore	Weird Tales	1933	
Shatterday	Harlan Ellison		1985	
Shell Game (short story)	Philip K. Dick	Galaxy Science Fiction	1954	
Shikari in Galveston	S. M. Stirling	Worlds That Weren't	2003	
Shoggoths in Bloom	Elizabeth Bear	Asimov's Science Fiction	2008	
Shonku Ekai Aksho	Satyajit Ray		1983	
Silence Please	Arthur C. Clarke	Science Fantasy	1950	
Sister Planet	Poul Anderson	Satellite Science Fiction	1959	
Skirmish on a Summer Morning	Bob Shaw	Cosmic Kaleidoscope	1976	
Sky Lift	Robert A. Heinlein	The Menace from Earth	1953	
Sleeping Beauty (short story)	Arthur C. Clarke	Infinity Science Fiction	1957	
Slow Life (novelette)	Michael Swanwick	Analog Science Fiction	2002	
Slow Sculpture	Theodore Sturgeon	Galaxy Science Fiction	1970	
Soldier Boy	Michael Shaara	Galaxy Science Fiction	1953	
Soldier from Tomorrow	Harlan Ellison	Fantastic Universe	1957	
Something Up There Likes Me	Alfred Bester	Astounding: The John W Campbell Memorial Anthology	1973	
Son of the Tree	Jack Vance	Ace Books	1951	
Source Decay	Charlie Jane Anders	Strange Horizons	2011	
Space Jockey	Robert A. Heinlein	The Saturday Evening Post	1947	
Special Delivery	Damon Knight	Galaxy Science Fiction	1954	
Specialist	Robert Sheckley		1953	
Speech Sounds	Octavia Butler	Asimov's Science Fiction	1983	
Spell My Name with an S	Isaac Asimov	Star Science Fiction	1958	
Stability (short story)	Philip K. Dick		1987	
Stable Strategies for Middle Management	Eileen Gunn	Asimov's Science Fiction	1988	
Star Light (short story)	Isaac Asimov	Science American	1962	
Stellar Ships	Ivan Yefremov		1948	
Sticks (short story)	Karl Edward Wagner	Whispers	1974	
Study in Still Life	Eric Frank Russell	Astounding Science Fiction	1959	
Suitable for the Orient	Karen Traviss	Asimov's Science Fiction	1963	
Sun of China	Liu Cixin		2002	2002 Galaxy Award winner.
Superiority (short story)	Arthur C. Clarke	The Magazine of Fantasy & Science Fiction	1951	
Supertoys Last All Summer Long	Brian Aldiss	Harper's Bazaar	1969	
Surface Tension (short story)	James Blish	Galaxy Science Fiction	1952	
Swarm	Bruce Sterling	The Magazine of Fantasy & Science Fiction	1982	
Swords Against Tomorrow	Robert Hoskins	Signet Books	1970	
Syzygies and Lunar Quadratures Aligned to the Meridian of Mérida of the Yucatán by an Anctitone or Inhabitant of the Moon, and Addressed to the Scholar Don Ambrosio de Echevarria	Manuel Antonio de Rivas		~1775	
Take a Match	Isaac Asimov	New Dimensions II	1972	
Take Us to Your Chief: and Other Stories	Drew Hayden Taylor		2016	Publisher: Douglas & McIntyre
Taklamakan (short story)	Bruce Sterling		1998	
TAP (novelette)	Greg Egan		1995	
Terminal Avenue	Eden Robinson		1995	
Test to Destruction	Keith Laumer	Dangerous Visions	1967	
That Only a Mother	Judith Merril		1948	
The Adaptive Ultimate	Stanley G. Weinbaum	Analog Science Fiction	1935	
The Answer	H. Beam Piper	Fantastic Universe	1959	
The Aqueduct (story)	Ray Bradbury		1979	
The Awakening (short story)	Arthur C. Clarke		1942	
The Ballad of Black Tom	Victor LaValle		2016	
The Barbie Murders	John Varley	Asimov's Science Fiction	1978	
The Beast That Shouted Love at the Heart of the World	Harlan Ellison	Avon	1969	
The Bitter End (short story)	Randall Garrett	Asimov's Science Fiction	1978	
The Black Pits of Luna	Robert A. Heinlein	The Saturday Evening Post	1948	
The Black Stone	Robert E. Howard	Weird Tales	1931	
The Bookmaking Habits of Select Species	Ken Liu	Lightspeed	2012	
The Brains of Rats	Michael Blumlein		1988	
The Builder (short story)	Philip K. Dick	Amazing Stories	1954	
The Call of Cthulhu	H. P. Lovecraft	Weird Tales	1928	
The Caller of the Black	Brian Lumley	Arkham House	1971	
The Calvin Coolidge Home for Dead Comedians	Bradley Denton	Fantasy and Science Fiction	1988	
The Children of the Night	Robert E. Howard	Weird Tales	1931	
The Chronic Argonauts	H. G. Wells		1888	
The Cloak and the Staff	Gordon R. Dickson	Analog Science Fiction	1980	
The Clock That Went Backward	Edward Page Mitchell	The Sun	1881	
The Clockwork Atom Bomb	Dominic Green	Interzone	2005	
The Cold Equations	Tom Godwin		1954	
The Colour Out of Space	H. P. Lovecraft	Amazing Stories	1927	
The Comet (short story)	W. E. B. Du Bois		1920	
The Commuter (short story)	Philip K. Dick	Amazing Stories	1953	
The Concentration City	J. G. Ballard	New Worlds	1957	
The Conversation of Eiros and Charmion	Edgar Allan Poe	Burton's Gentleman's Magazine	1839	
The Coon Rolled Down and Ruptured His Larinks, A Squeezed Novel by Mr. Skunk	Dafydd ab Hugh	Asimov's Science Fiction	1990	
The Country of the Kind	Damon Knight	The Magazine of Fantasy & Science Fiction	1956	
The Crawlers	Philip K. Dick	Imagination	1954	
The Crystal Crypt	Philip K. Dick	Planet Stories	1954	
The Crystal Spheres	David Brin	Analog	1984	
The Curse (Clarke story)	Arthur C. Clarke		1946	
The Curse of Yig	H. P. Lovecraft, Zealia Bishop	Weird Tales	1929	
The Damned Thing	Ambrose Bierce	Town Topics	1893	
The Dancers at the End of Time	Michael Moorcock	New Worlds	1981	
The Dandelion Girl	Robert F. Young	The Saturday Evening Post	1961	
The Darfsteller	Walter M. Miller	Astounding Science Fiction	1955	
The Dark Between the Stars	Kevin J. Anderson		2011	
The Day After the Day the Martians Came	Frederik Pohl	Dangerous Visions	1967	
The Day of Forever	J. G. Ballard	Panther	1967	
The Dead	Michael Swanwick		1996	
The Deathbird	Harlan Ellison		1974	
The Defenseless Dead	Larry Niven		1973	
The Diamond Pit	Jack Dann	Jubilee	2001	
The Disaster Area	J. G. Ballard	Jonathan Cape	1967	
The Discarded	Harlan Ellison		1959	
The Disintegration Machine	Arthur Conan Doyle	The Strand Magazine	1929	
The Doll-House	Hugh Parry	Dangerous Visions	1967	
The Dowry of Angyar	Ursula K. Le Guin		1964	
The Dragon Masters	Jack Vance	Ace Books	1963	
The Dreams in the Witch House	H. P. Lovecraft	Weird Tales	1933	
The Dunwich Horror	H. P. Lovecraft	Weird Tales	1929	
The Dying Night	Isaac Asimov	Fantasy and Science Fiction	1956	
The Enchantress of Venus	Leigh Brackett	Planet Stories	1949	
The Enemy (short story)	Damon Knight	Venture Science Fiction	1958	
The Eternal Adam	Jules Verne		1910	
The Evening and the Morning and the Night	Octavia Butler	Omni	1987	
The Evolution of Trickster Stories Among the Dogs of North Park After the Change	Kij Johnson		2007	
The Exiles (Bradbury story)	Ray Bradbury	Maclean's	1949	
The Exit Door Leads In	Philip K. Dick		1979	
The Far Look	Theodore L. Thomas	Astounding Science Fiction	1956	
The Father-thing	Philip K. Dick		1954	
The Fermi Paradox Is Our Business Model	Charlie Jane Anders	Tor.com	2010	
The Festival	H. P. Lovecraft	Weird Tales	1923	
The First Men	Howard Fast	The Magazine of Fantasy and Science Fiction	1960	
The Fly	George Langelaan	Playboy	1957	
The Fog Horn	Ray Bradbury		1951	
The Food of the Gods (short story)	Arthur C. Clarke	Playboy	1964	
The Fort Moxie Branch	Jack McDevitt		1988	
The Fun They Had	Isaac Asimov	Boys and Girls Page	1951	
The Galoshes of Fortune	Hans Christian Andersen	Three Poetical Works. (Tre Digtninger.)	1838	
The Gambler (Bacigalupi story)	Paolo Bacigalupi	Fast Forward 2	2008	
The General Zapped an Angel	Howard Fast	William Morrow	1970	
The Ghost Pit	Stephen Baxter		2001	
The Gift of Gab	Jack Vance	Analog Science Fiction	1955	
The Girl Who Was Plugged In	James Tiptree Jr.		1974	
The Gnarly Man	L. Sprague de Camp	Unknown	1939	
The God in the Bowl	Robert E. Howard	Space Science Fiction	1952	
The Golden Kite, the Silver Wind	Ray Bradbury		1953	
The Great C	Philip K. Dick	Fantastic Story Magazine	1953	
The Great Nebraska Sea	Allan Danzig	Galaxy Science Fiction	1963	
The Great Secret	L. Ron Hubbard	Science Fiction Stories	1943	
The Great Simoleon Caper	Neal Stephenson	TIME	1995	
The Great Wall of Mexico (short story)	John Sladek	Bad Moon Rising: An Anthology of Political Forebodings	1973	
The Green Leopard Plague	Walter Jon Williams		2004	
The Gun (short story)	Philip K. Dick	Planet Stories	1984	
The Gunslinger (novella)	Stephen King	The Magazine of Fantasy and Science Fiction	1978	
The Gunslinger and the Dark Man	Stephen King	The Magazine of Fantasy and Science Fiction	1981	
The Hanging Stranger	Philip K. Dick	Science Fiction Adventures	1953	
The Happy Breed	John Sladek	Dangerous Visions	1967	
The Haunter of the Dark	H. P. Lovecraft	Weird Tales	1936	
The Haunter of the Ring	Robert E. Howard	Weird Tales	1934	
The Heart of the Serpent	Ivan Yefremov	Foreign Languages	1958	
The Hemingway Hoax	Joe Haldeman		1990	
The Hibited Man	L. Sprague de Camp	Thrilling Wonder Stories	1949	
The Hole Man	Larry Niven	Analog	1974	
The Hood Maker	Philip K. Dick	Imagination	1955	
The Hound	H. P. Lovecraft	Weird Tales	1924	
The House Beyond Your Sky	Benjamin Rosenbaum	Strange Horizons	2006	
The House of the Worm	Gary Myers		1975	
The House on Maple Street	Stephen King	Nightmares & Dreamscapes	1993	
The Houses of Iszm	Jack Vance	Ace Books	1964	
The Impossible Man	J. G. Ballard	Berkley Books	1966	
The Indefatigable Frog	Philip K. Dick	Fantastic Story Magazine	1953	
The Infinites	Philip K. Dick	Planet Stories	1953	
The Jigsaw Man	Larry Niven	Dangerous Visions	1967	
The July Ward	S.N. Dyer	Asimov's Science Fiction	1991	
The Keeper	H. Beam Piper	Venture Science Fiction	1957	
The Key	Isaac Asimov	The Magazine of Fantasy & Science Fiction	1966	
The Land Ironclads	H. G. Wells	The Strand Magazine	1903	
The Last Castle	Jack Vance		1966	
The Last Command (short story)	Keith Laumer		1967	
The Last Defender of Camelot (short story)	Roger Zelazny	Asimov's SF Adventure Magazine	1979	
The Last Full Measure	George Alec Effinger	Asimov's Science Fiction	1978	
The Last Lunarians	John Wyndham		1973	
The Last of the Masters	Philip K. Dick	Orbit Science Fiction	1953	
The Last of the Winnebagos	Connie Willis	Asimov's Science Fiction	1988	
The Last Trump	Isaac Asimov	Fantastic Universe	1955	
The Last Word	Damon Knight	Satellite Science Fiction	1957	
The Lawnmower Man	Stephen King	Cavalier	1975	
The Liberation of Earth	William Tenn	Future Science Fiction	1953	
The Lincoln Train	Maureen F. McHugh		1995	
The Little Black Bag	Cyril M. Kornbluth	Analog Science Fiction	1950	
The Little Movement	Philip K. Dick	The Magazine of Fantasy & Science Fiction	1952	
The Little Sisters of Eluria	Stephen King	Legends	1998	
The Long Rain	Ray Bradbury	Planet Stories	1950	
The Long Watch	Robert A. Heinlein		1949	
The Longest Voyage	Poul Anderson	Analog Science Fiction	1960	
The Love Letter (1998 film)	Jack Finney	The Saturday Evening Post	1959	
The Machine Stops	E. M. Forster	The Oxford and Cambridge Review	1909	
The Machine That Won the War (short story)	Isaac Asimov	The Magazine of Fantasy & Science Fiction	1961	
The Man Who Bridged the Mist	Kij Johnson	Asimov's Science Fiction	2011	
The Man Who Came Early	Poul Anderson	The Magazine of Fantasy & Science Fiction	1956	
The Man Who Evolved	Edmond Hamilton	Wonder Stories	1931	
The Man Who Ploughed the Sea	Arthur C. Clarke	Satellite Science Fiction	1957	
The Man Who Sold Rope to the Gnoles	Margaret St. Clair		1951	
The Man Who Sold the Moon	Robert A. Heinlein		1950	
The Martian Star-Gazers	Frederik Pohl	Galaxy Science Fiction	1962	
The Men and the Mirror	Ross Rocklynne	Astounding Science Fiction	1938	
The Men Who Murdered Mohammed	Alfred Bester	The Magazine of Fantasy & Science Fiction	1958	
The Menace from Earth	Robert A. Heinlein	The Magazine of Fantasy & Science Fiction	1957	
The Message (short story)	Isaac Asimov	The Magazine of Fantasy and Science Fiction	1956	
The Million Cities	J. T. McIntosh		1958	
The Monster	A. E. van Vogt	Analog Science Fiction	1948	
The Monster of Lake LaMetrie	Wardon Allan Curtis	Pearson's Magazine	1899	
The Moon Is Hell!	John W. Campbell Jr.		1950	
The Moon Moth	Jack Vance	Galaxy	1961	
The Morphology of the Kirkham Wreck	Hilbert Schenck	The Magazine of Fantasy & Science Fiction	1978	
The Nameless City	H. P. Lovecraft	The Wolverine	1921	
The New Accelerator	H. G. Wells	The Strand Magazine	1901	
The New Prime	Jack Vance	Worlds Beyond	1951	
The Night That All Time Broke Out	Brian W. Aldiss	Dangerous Visions	1967	
The Nutcracker Coup	Janet Kagan	Asimov's Science Fiction	1992	
No Woman Born	C. L. Moore	Analog Science Fiction	1944	
The Oracle and the Mountains	Stephen King	The Magazine of Fantasy and Science Fiction	1981	
The Originist	Orson Scott Card	Foundation's Friends	1989	
The Past Through Tomorrow	Robert A. Heinlein		1975	collection
The Pause (story)	Isaac Asimov		1954	
The Pedestrian	Ray Bradbury	The Reporter	1951	
The People of Sand and Slag	Paolo Bacigalupi	The Magazine of Fantasy & Science Fiction	2004	
The Persistence of Vision	John Varley	The Magazine of Fantasy and Science Fiction	1978	
The Planck Dive	Greg Egan	Asimov's Science Fiction	1998	
The Possessed (short story)	Arthur C. Clarke	Dynamic Science Fiction	1953	
The Pre-persons	Philip K. Dick	The Magazine of Fantasy & Science Fiction	1974	
The Preserving Machine (short story)	Philip K. Dick	The Magazine of Fantasy & Science Fiction	1953	
The Prize of Peril	Robert Sheckley	Bantam Books	1960	
The Proper Study	Isaac Asimov	Boys' Life	1968	
The Prophets' Paradise	Robert W. Chambers		1895	
The Prowler in the City at the Edge of the World	Harlan Ellison	Dangerous Visions	1967	
The Queen of Air and Darkness (novella)	Poul Anderson	The Magazine of Fantasy and Science Fiction	1971	
The Queer Story of Brownlow's Newspaper	H. G. Wells	Ladies' Home Journal	1932	
The Rats in the Walls	H. P. Lovecraft	Weird Tales	1923	
The Ray-Gun: A Love Story	James Alan Gardner	Asimov's Science Fiction	2008	
The Red One	Jack London		1918	
The Red Queen's Race	Isaac Asimov	Analog Science Fiction	1949	
The Reluctant Orchid	Arthur C. Clarke	Satellite Science Fiction	1956	
The Resurrection of Jimber-Jaw	Edgar Rice		1937	
The Return	Roberto Bolaño		2010	
The Return of the Sorcerer	Clark Ashton Smith	Strange Tales of Mystery and Terror	1931	
The Return of William Proxmire	Larry Niven		1989	
The Riddle of the Universe and Its Solution	Christopher Cherniak		1981	
The Rocket (short story)	Ray Bradbury		1950	
The Rulers	A. E. van Vogt	Analog Science Fiction	1946	
The Runaway Skyscraper	Murray Leinster	Argosy	1919	
The Ruum	Arthur Porges	The Magazine of Fantasy and Science Fiction	1953	
The Saturn Game	Poul Anderson	Analog Science Fiction	1981	
The Screwfly Solution	Raccoona Sheldon	Analog Science Fiction	1977	
The Search (short story)	A. E. van Vogt	Analog Science Fiction	1943	
The Secret (short story)	Arthur C. Clarke	This Week	1963	
The Secret Sense	Isaac Asimov	Cosmic Stories	1941	
The Sensitive Man	Poul Anderson	Fantastic Universe	1954	
The Sentinel (short story)	Arthur C. Clarke	Ten Story Fantasy	1951	
The Shadow over Innsmouth	H. P. Lovecraft	Visionary Publishing Company	1936	
The Shambler from the Stars (Short Story)	Robert Bloch	Weird Tales	1935	
The Sharing of Flesh	Poul Anderson	Galaxy Science Fiction	1968	
The Shobies' Story	Ursula K. Le Guin	Universe 1	1990	
The Short Happy Life of the Brown Oxford	Philip K. Dick	The Magazine of Fantasy & Science Fiction	1954	
The Silver Key	H.P. Lovecraft	Weird Tales	1929	
The Singing Bell	Isaac Asimov	Fantasy and Science Fiction	1955	
The Skull (short story)	Philip K. Dick	The Magazine of Fantasy & Science Fiction	1952	
The Sliced-Crosswise Only-On-Tuesday World	Philip José Farmer	New Dimensions 1 (Doubleday)	1971	
The Slithering Shadow	Robert E. Howard	Weird Tales	1933	
The Slow Mutants	Stephen King	The Magazine of Fantasy and Science Fiction	1981	
The Sound (short story)	A. E. van Vogt	Analog Science Fiction	1950	
The Sound-Sweep	J. G. Ballard		1959	
The Sounds of Old Earth	Matthew Kressel	Lightspeed	2013	
The Space Traders	Derrick Bell		1992	
The Specter General	Theodore Cogswell	Astounding Science Fiction	1952	
The Statement of Randolph Carter	H. P. Lovecraft		1919	
The Stolen Dormouse	L. Sprague de Camp	Analog Science Fiction	1941	
The Strange High House in the Mist	H.P. Lovecraft	Weird Tales	1931	
The Streets of Ashkelon	Harry Harrison	New Worlds	1962	
The Tale of Satampra Zeiros	Clark Ashton Smith	Weird Tales	1931	
The Talking Stone	Isaac Asimov	Fantasy and Science Fiction	1955	
The Terrible Old Man	H. P. Lovecraft		1920	
The Testament of Athammaus	Clark Ashton Smith	Weird Tales	1932	
The Thing on the Doorstep	H. P. Lovecraft	Weird Tales	1937	
The Tissue-Culture King	Julian Huxley	Cornhill Magazine, The Yale Review	1926	
The Tower of the Elephant	Robert E. Howard	Weird Tales	1933	
The Toynbee Convector	Ray Bradbury	Playboy	1984	
The Tryouts	Barry B. Longyear	Asimov's Science Fiction	1978	
The Tunnel under the World	Frederik Pohl	Galaxy Science Fiction	1955	
The Ugly Little Boy	Isaac Asimov	Galaxy Science Fiction	1958	
The Ultimate Melody	Arthur C. Clarke	If	1957	
The Undiscovered	William Sanders	Asimov's Science Fiction	1997	
The Ungoverned	Vernor Vinge		1985	
The Unnamable (short story)	H.P. Lovecraft	Weird Tales	1925	
The Unparalleled Adventure of One Hans Pfaall	Edgar Allan Poe		1835	
The Unreconstructed M	Philip K. Dick	Science Fiction Stories	1957	
The Vale of Lost Women	Robert E. Howard	The Magazine of Horror	1967	
The Vaporization Enthalpy of a Peculiar Pakistani Family	Usman T. Malik		2014	
The Veldt (short story)	Ray Bradbury	The Saturday Evening Post	1950	
The Village	Kate Wilhelm		1973	
The Voice in the Night	William Hope Hodgson	Blue Book Magazine	1907	
The Wages of Syntax	Ray Vukcevich	Sci Fiction	2003	
The Waitabits	Eric Frank Russell	Analog Science Fiction	1955	
The Wall Around the World	Theodore Cogswell	Beyond Fantasy Fiction	1953	
The Water That Falls on You from Nowhere	John Chu	Tor.com	2013	
The Watery Place	Isaac Asimov	Satellite Science Fiction	1956	
The Way of Cross and Dragon	George R. R. Martin	Omni	1979	
The Way Station	Stephen King	The Magazine of Fantasy and Science Fiction	1980	
The Web (story series)			1999	collection
The Whisperer in Darkness	H. P. Lovecraft	Weird Tales	1931	
The Wilderness	Ray Bradbury	The Magazine of Fantasy & Science Fiction	1952	
The Windows of Heaven	John Brunner	New Worlds	1956	
The Women Men Don't See	James Tiptree, Jr.	The Magazine of Fantasy & Science Fiction	1973	
The World Well Lost	Theodore Sturgeon	Universe	1953	
The Xi Effect	Robert S. Richardson	Astounding Science Fiction	1950	
There Will Come Soft Rains	Ray Bradbury	Collier's	1950	
They (Heinlein)	Robert A. Heinlein	Unknown	1941	
Thing of Beauty (short story)	Damon Knight	Galaxy Science Fiction	1958	
Think Blue, Count Two	Cordwainer Smith	Galaxy Science Fiction	1963	
Think Like a Dinosaur	James Patrick Kelly	Asimov's Science Fiction	1995	
Think! (short story)	Isaac Asimov	Asimov's Science Fiction	1977	
Thiotimoline	Isaac Asimov	Analog Science Fiction	1948	
Thirsty God	Margaret St. Clair	The Magazine of Fantasy & Science Fiction	1953	
Thor Meets Captain America	David Brin		1986	
Through the Gates of the Silver Key	H. P. Lovecraft, E. Hoffmann Price	Weird Tales	1934	
Scales (short story)	Alastair Reynolds	Lightspeed Magazine	2011	
Tideline (short story)	Elizabeth Bear	Asimov's Science Fiction	2007	
Time and Stars	Poul Anderson		1964	
Time Considered as a Helix of Semi-Precious Stones	Samuel R. Delany		1968	
Time Enough	Damon Knight	Amazing Science Fiction Stories	1960	
Time's Arrow (short story)	Arthur C. Clarke	Science Fantasy	1950	
Titanium Mike Saves the Day	David D. Levine	Fantasy & Science Fiction	2007	
Tk'tk'tk	David D. Levine	Asimov's Science Fiction	2005	
Tlön, Uqbar, Orbis Tertius	Jorge Luis Borges	Sur	1961	
To Arkham and the Stars	Fritz Leiber		1966	
To Mars and Providence	Don Webb		1996	
To Serve Man	Damon Knight	Galaxy Science Fiction	1950	
Tony and the Beetles	Philip K. Dick		1953	
Tower of Babylon	Ted Chiang	Omni	1990	
Track 12	J. G. Ballard	New Worlds	1958	
Transfusion	Chad Oliver	Astounding Science Fiction	1959	
Transience (short story)	Arthur C. Clarke	Startling Stories	1949	
Travel by Wire!	Arthur C. Clarke	Amateur Science Stories	1937	
Trends (short story)	Isaac Asimov	Analog Science Fiction	1939	
Trouble with the Natives	Arthur C. Clarke	Lilliput	1951	
True Names	Vernor Vinge		1981	
Ullward's Retreat	Jack Vance	Galaxy	1958	
Uncharted Territory (novella)	Connie Willis		1994	
Uncommon Sense	Hal Clement		1945	
Understand (story)	Ted Chiang	Asimov's Science Fiction	1991	
Vaster than Empires and More Slow	Ursula K. Le Guin	New Dimensions 1 (Doubleday)	1971	
Vault of the Beast	A. E. van Vogt	Astounding Science Fiction	1940	
Venture to the Moon	Arthur C. Clarke	Evening Standard	1956	
Venus and the Seven Sexes	William Tenn	The Girl with the Hungry Eyes	1949	
Venus Equilateral	George O. Smith		1947	
Venus Smiles	J. G. Ballard	Science Fantasy	1957	
Vintage Season	C. L. Moore, Henry Kuttner		1946	
Wanderers of Time (short story)	John Wyndham	Wonder Stories	1933	
War Game (short story)	Philip K. Dick	Galaxy Science Fiction	1959	
War Veteran	Philip K. Dick	If	1955	
Waterspider	Philip K. Dick	If	1964	
We Also Walk Dogs	Robert A. Heinlein	Astounding Science Fiction	1941	
What Goes Up (short story)	Arthur C. Clarke	The Magazine of Fantasy & Science Fiction	1956	
Whatever Happened to Corporal Cuckoo?	Gerald Kersh		1953	
When in the Course	H. Beam Piper		1981	
When It Ends, He Catches Her	Eugie Foster	Daily Science Fiction	2014	
When the Twerms Came	Arthur C. Clarke	Playboy	1972	
When the World Screamed	Arthur Conan Doyle	Liberty	1928	
Who Goes There?	John W. Campbell, Jr.	Astounding Science Fiction	1938	
Who's Afraid of Wolf 359?	Ken MacLeod	The New Space Opera (Eos)	2007	
Why I Left Harry's All-Night Hamburgers	Lawrence Watt-Evans	Asimov's Science Fiction	1987	
Wild Minds	Michael Swanwick	Asimov's Science Fiction	1998	
Window (short story)	Bob Leman	The Magazine of Fantasy & Science Fiction	1980	
Winter's King	Ursula K. Le Guin	Orbit	1969	
With Folded Hands	Jack Williamson	Fantasy Press	1947	
With Morning Comes Mistfall	George R. R. Martin	Analog Science Fiction & Fact	1973	
Yellow Card Man	Paolo Bacigalupi	Asimov's Science Fiction	2006	
You Were Right, Joe	J. T. McIntosh	Galaxy Science Fiction	1957	
You're Another	Damon Knight	The Magazine of Fantasy and Science Fiction	1955	
Young Zaphod Plays It Safe	Douglas Adams		1986	
Zone of Terror	J. G. Ballard	New Worlds	1960	

== Award winning short stories ==
The two main awards given in American science fiction are the Hugos and the Nebulas. Complete lists of the short stories that won these awards are at Hugo Award for Best Short Story and Nebula Award for Best Short Story.

== See also ==
- The Science Fiction Hall of Fame Volume One, 1929-1964, the best short stories from before the awarding of the Nebulas.
