= The Minority Report (1991 collection) =

1991 collection of science fiction stories by Philip K. Dick

- Cover of the first edition
- Author: Philip K. Dick
- Language: English
- Genre: Science fiction
- Publisher: Citadel Twilight
- Publication date: 1991
- Publication place: United States
- Media type: Print (paperback)
- Pages: 380 pp
- ISBN: 0-8065-1276-8
- OCLC: 25363220

The Minority Report is a re-titled collection of science fiction stories by Philip K. Dick. It was published by Gollancz and Citadel Twilight in 1991, being a reprint of Volume IV, "The Days of Perky Pat" of The Collected Stories of Philip K. Dick (1987). The collection The Days of Perky Pat was published in Britain in hardback by Gollancz in 1990 and in paperback by Grafton in 1991. The stories had originally appeared in the magazines Galaxy Science Fiction, Science Fiction Stories, If, Fantastic Universe, Fantasy and Science Fiction, Fantastic, Worlds of Tomorrow, Escapade and Amazing Stories.

== Contents ==
- How Do You Know You’re Reading Philip K. Dick?, by James Tiptree, Jr
- "Autofac"
- "Service Call"
- "Captive Market"
- "The Mold of Yancy"
- "The Minority Report"
- "Recall Mechanism"
- "The Unreconstructed M"
- "Explorers We"
- "War Game"
- "If There Were No Benny Cemoli"
- "Novelty Act"
- "Waterspider"
- "What the Dead Men Say"
- "Orpheus with Clay Feet"
- "The Days of Perky Pat"
- "Stand-by"
- "What'll We Do with Ragland Park?"
- "Oh, to Be a Blobel!"
- Notes
