= The Days of Perky Pat (collection) =

1990 collection of stories by Philip K. Dick

- Dust-jacket from the first edition
- Author: Philip K. Dick
- Language: English
- Genre: Science fiction
- Publisher: Gollancz
- Publication date: 1990
- Publication place: United Kingdom
- Media type: Print (hardback)
- Pages: 380 pp
- ISBN: 0-575-04756-9
- OCLC: 59199340

The Days of Perky Pat is a collection of science fiction stories by American writer Philip K. Dick. It was first published by Gollancz in 1990 and reprints Volume IV of The Collected Stories of Philip K. Dick. It had not previously been published as a stand-alone volume. The stories had originally appeared in the magazines Galaxy Science Fiction, Science Fiction Stories, If, Fantastic Universe, Fantasy and Science Fiction, Fantastic, Worlds of Tomorrow, Escapade and Amazing Stories.

== Contents ==
- How Do You Know You’re Reading Philip K. Dick?, by James Tiptree, Jr.
- "Autofac"
- "Service Call"
- "Captive Market"
- "The Mold of Yancy"
- "The Minority Report"
- "Recall Mechanism"
- "The Unreconstructed M"
- "Explorers We"
- "War Game"
- "If There Were No Benny Cemoli"
- "Novelty Act"
- "Waterspider"
- "What the Dead Men Say"
- "Orpheus with Clay Feet"
- "The Days of Perky Pat"
- "Stand-by"
- "What'll We Do with Ragland Park?"
- "Oh, to Be a Blobel!"
- Notes
