= The Windows of Heaven =

The Windows of Heaven may refer to:

- "The Windows of Heaven" (short story), a 1956 short story by John Brunner
- The Windows of Heaven (film), a 1963 film about LDS Church President Lorenzo Snow

== See also ==
- Windows of Heaven, an album by Jefferson Starship
