= King Solomon's Ring =

King Solomon's Ring may refer to:

- The Seal of Solomon, a legendary ring
- King Solomon's Ring (book), a book by Konrad Lorenz
- "King Solomon's Ring" (short story), a short story by Roger Zelazny
- The Ring of Solomon, a children's fantasy novel by Jonathan Stroud
