= The Last Command =

The Last Command may refer to:

- The Last Command (1928 film), a 1928 silent film
- The Last Command (1955 film), a film about the Battle of the Alamo
- The Last Command (novel), a Star Wars book
- The Last Command (album), a heavy metal album by W.A.S.P.
- "The Last Command" (short story), a story by Arthur C. Clarke
