= The Penultimate Truth =

1964 science fiction novel by Philip K. Dick

- First-edition paperback cover
- Author: Philip K. Dick
- Language: English
- Genre: Science fiction
- Publisher: Belmont Books
- Publication date: 1964
- Publication place: United States
- Media type: Print (paperback)
- Pages: 174

The Penultimate Truth is a 1964 science fiction novel by American writer Philip K. Dick, first published by Belmont Books. Set in 2025, it depicts a society in which most people live in underground shelters, manufacturing military robots for a war they believe is still being fought. The war has ended, but a ruling minority maintains the deception while occupying private estates on the surface. The narrative follows Nicholas St. James, who leaves his shelter to obtain an artificial organ, and Joseph Adams, a propagandist drawn into a struggle among the rulers.

Dick drew on earlier fiction, including the short stories "The Defenders" and "The Mold of Yancy", and completed the novel in 1964 under the working title In the Mold of Yancy. Critical interpretations have examined its treatment of propaganda, social hierarchy, community, and the manipulation of historical evidence.

Robert Silverberg praised the novel's plotting, characters, and pace while criticizing its prose. Later assessments by Darko Suvin, Kim Stanley Robinson, and Thomas M. Disch questioned aspects of its narrative construction, particularly the intrigue and time-travel elements. Subsequent commentary has considered its political relevance and compared its automated speech-writing device, the rhetorizer, with generative artificial intelligence.

== Background and publication ==
The Penultimate Truth drew on several of Dick's earlier works, including the short stories "The Defenders" (1953) and "The Mold of Yancy" (1955). Anthony Wolk identifies the underground weapons factories, the robot "leadies", and the false reports of a continuing surface war as elements carried over from "The Defenders". Andrew M. Butler also identifies material drawn from "The Unreconstructed M", Nicholas and the Higs, and The Man Whose Teeth Were All Exactly Alike. He connects Nicholas and the Higs to the reuse of character names and The Man Whose Teeth Were All Exactly Alike to the novel's use of planted archaeological evidence.

In the story notes accompanying his collection The Golden Man (1980), Dick recalled that Yancy had been modeled on President Dwight D. Eisenhower. He described "The Mold of Yancy" as a basis for The Penultimate Truth, particularly its premise of a government whose public statements were false.

The novel's working title was In the Mold of Yancy. Butler dates its outline to March 18, 1964, and reports that Dick completed the novel by May 12 of that year.

The Penultimate Truth was first published by Belmont Books in New York in 1964. Later editions included a Vintage paperback published in 2004. Brilliance Audio also issued an unabridged recording narrated by Nick Podehl, whose compelling narration and vocal range were praised by Publishers Weekly.

== Plot ==
In 2025, most of humanity lives in underground shelters called "ant tanks", where the inhabitants manufacture military robots known as "leadies". They believe that a war between the Wes-Dem and Pac-Peop blocs continues above them, leaving the surface uninhabitable because of combat, radiation, and disease. Broadcasts from their leader, Talbot Yancy, report destruction and demand continued production. In reality, the war ended thirteen years earlier. The former enemies' ruling groups maintain the deception while occupying extensive private estates, where they use the robots as servants and guards. Yancy is a mechanical simulacrum whose speeches are prepared by propagandists called Yance-men. Stanton Brose controls this system.

Nicholas St. James, president of the Tom Mix tank, faces a crisis when the tank's chief mechanic, Maury Souza, dies of a pancreatic condition. The tank's physician, Carol Tigh, immediately freezes Souza's body so that he can be revived if an artificial pancreas becomes available. Without Souza, the community risks failing to meet its production quota and being dissolved. Official channels offer no prospect of obtaining the organ. A committee of residents collects money and pressures Nicholas to seek one on the surface, threatening him with a bomb if he refuses. Nicholas reluctantly agrees and completes a tunnel begun by the committee, expecting to encounter the dangers described in the broadcasts.

Above ground, Yance-man Joseph Adams receives an assignment from Brose to help destroy housing developer Louis Runcible. Runcible houses former tank inhabitants in large apartment developments, although the residents remain confined. Brose suspects him of informing underground communities that the war has ended. Brose plans to plant counterfeit alien weapons and remains beneath Runcible's Utah construction site, using a time-travel device to deposit them centuries in the past. He expects Runcible to conceal their discovery, giving the authorities grounds to imprison him and confiscate his holdings. Adams is assigned to write fraudulent scientific articles establishing the objects' archaeological importance, while his friend Verne Lindblom manufactures the artifacts.

Nicholas emerges on land belonging to David Lantano, another Yance-man. Two leadies capture him, seal his tunnel, and prepare to kill him, but a man resembling Yancy destroys them. Directed toward the ruins of Cheyenne, Nicholas encounters former tank inhabitants who explain that the war has ended and that the broadcasts conceal actual conditions on the surface. Although radioactive areas remain, the world is not the continuous battlefield he expected. Lantano subsequently brings Nicholas to his estate and offers to help him obtain the pancreas. Meanwhile, Adams considers warning Runcible about Brose's scheme.

Brose's scheme is disrupted when his agent at the construction site, Robert Hig, is killed after uncovering a planted artifact. Excavation resumes, and the machinery destroys the exposed object. Then Lindblom, who manufactured the counterfeit artifacts, is murdered by a wartime assassination machine that plants false evidence to implicate someone else. Adams fears that Brose is eliminating those involved in the scheme and seeks protection at Lantano's estate. Investigator Webster Foote examines the clues implicating Brose in Lindblom's murder but recognizes that the machine has fabricated them. His investigation also brings him to Lantano's estate, where Nicholas is seeking help obtaining the pancreas.

Lantano reveals that he is a Cherokee from the fifteenth century who acquired time-travel technology through the artifacts sent into the past. His physical age fluctuates, and his older form resembles Yancy. He intends to overthrow Brose and assume Yancy's role. Lantano, Foote, and Adams plan to install a specialized dart weapon in Adams's office, which Brose visits. Privately, Lantano admits to Foote that he killed Hig to protect Runcible and murdered Lindblom to convince Adams that Brose must be eliminated. Because Brose avoids Lantano, Adams's office provides an opportunity to reach him.

With information from Foote and equipment and leadies supplied by Lantano, Nicholas locates a buried medical depot and obtains the pancreas. Adams abandons the assassination plan after recognizing Lantano's responsibility for Lindblom's murder. When Foote's guards threaten to force him to continue to New York, Adams signals his leadies to kill them. He then joins Nicholas and accompanies him underground to hide. Carol successfully implants the pancreas and revives Souza.

A delayed Yancy broadcast announces that the war has ended and promises a gradual return to the surface. Nicholas and Adams conclude that Brose has been killed, although the circumstances of his defeat and the resulting distribution of power remain unknown to them. The broadcast does not acknowledge the years of deception. Adams hopes that Foote and Runcible can restrain Lantano but becomes preoccupied with how to explain the surface's extensive forests and maintained estates to the returning population.

Nicholas intends to tell the tank inhabitants the truth. Adams instead declares that he will return to his estate and write a speech accounting for what they will discover. Nicholas suggests that the authorities could claim that radiation made continued confinement necessary and that the fictitious war prevented people from emerging too soon. Adams believes that a persuasive explanation can be devised. Nicholas resolves that the tank inhabitants will not allow themselves to be deceived again.

== Themes and analysis ==
=== Propaganda and political power ===
Thomas M. Disch reads The Penultimate Truth in the context of Cold War and nuclear anxieties, interpreting its apparently permanent war as a political order sustained through the media. He compares its use of manufactured crisis with Dick's The Zap Gun and George Orwell's Nineteen Eighty-Four. John Garvey places The Penultimate Truth among several works by Dick whose plots involve widespread deception, citing the false war reports used to keep its population underground.

Television is central to Elena Ricci's interpretation of the novel as a critique of political structures maintained through propaganda. In her reading, a privileged minority controls the underground population by shaping its understanding of the war and conditions on the surface. Carl Freedman includes the novel's depiction of a "fiction machine" masquerading as a television set among his examples in an analysis connecting paranoia in Dick's fiction with commodities and conspiracy under capitalism.

The relationship between public visibility and authority also figures in Umberto Rossi's comparison of the novel with "The Mold of Yancy" and The Simulacra. Rossi groups these works as examples in which those who hold power are, or appear to be, the people seen on screens. He connects this dependence on visibility with Dick's treatment of fabricated identities, stage props, and simulacra in political life. Charles Thorpe similarly identifies The Penultimate Truth and The Simulacra as novels in which power combines technocratic, media, and military forms.

=== Social hierarchy and community ===
Kim Stanley Robinson interprets the division between the surface elite and underground workers as a political metaphor made literal through the novel's social arrangement. Zuzanna Gawrońska examines this hierarchy through the organization of space, including its horizontal and vertical divisions and the transitional spaces between them. She argues that the opposition between above and below expresses social and political rank while reversing the moral associations conventionally attached to those positions. Rossi interprets the relationship between the surface and underground populations as an inversion of the Morlock–Eloi arrangement in H. G. Wells's The Time Machine.

Merritt Abrash interprets the novel through the political thought of Jean-Jacques Rousseau, arguing that its social situation gives concrete form to Rousseau's ideas about freedom and subjection. He contrasts the community of the underground tanks with the isolation of the surface elite and considers governmental deception in relation to Rousseau's concept of the general will. He also associates Lantano with Rousseau's figure of the Legislator and relates the novel's propaganda to Rousseau's criticism of society. Abrash qualifies this interpretation by acknowledging that, beyond the novel's explicit reference to Rousseau, the evidence for direct influence is inferential; his inquiries found no evidence of Dick's particular interest in the philosopher.

=== Historical evidence and truth ===
Rossi distinguishes the novel's manipulation of historical evidence from the production of ordinary forgeries. He argues that the time scoop manufactures authenticity: by placing objects in the past, it changes the history from which archaeological evidence emerges. In this reading, the deception involves direct intervention in the past rather than simply false claims about it. Rossi also interprets Lantano and time travel as introducing uncertainty about what has actually occurred.

Gawrońska approaches the novel through the two meanings of apocalypse as catastrophe and revelation. She reads its successive disclosures as bringing the characters toward an approximation of truth rather than complete knowledge. Kenneth Krabbenhoft, in a comparative discussion of illusion and reality in Dick's fiction, characterizes the novel's underlying reality as ultimately unambiguous, distinguishing its deception of the underground population from the ambiguities associated with madness in other works he examines.

== Reception ==
Reviewing The Penultimate Truth in the April 1965 issue of Amazing Stories, Robert Silverberg praised its plotting, characterization, pace, and inventive detail, judging it consistent with Dick's high standard. Although he criticized the prose as cumbersome, he found that the narrative's momentum carried the reader along. He recommended the novel and placed Dick among the leading science-fiction writers of the period.

Later critics questioned aspects of the novel's construction. In 1975, Darko Suvin argued that the plot involving the ruling class, with its immortality and intrigue reminiscent of A. E. van Vogt, weakened a potentially interesting novel. He viewed Nicholas's persistence more favorably, interpreting it as political creativity within an oppressed community. In his 1984 study of Dick's novels, Kim Stanley Robinson considered the turn toward Lantano and time travel a structural flaw, while regarding the book as important to understanding Dick's literary approach in 1964–65. Thomas M. Disch also criticized the Brose–Runcible conflict and the time-travel material, attributing weaknesses in their development to the speed of the novel's composition.

Writing in La Nación in 2004, Pedro B. Rey regarded the novel as one of Dick's lesser works but argued that it had acquired renewed contemporary relevance. He contrasted its flexible system of control and manufactured war with the political order of Orwell's Nineteen Eighty-Four, relating its continuing relevance to political representation and artificial life extension. In a 2017 contribution to the National Book Critics Circle's "Resistance Lit" series, Jonathan Lethem interpreted the underground population's discovery of the deception as a metaphor for living within inequalities presented as necessary.

The novel has also been discussed in relation to generative artificial intelligence. In a 2024 article on writing education, Sarah W. Beck and Sarah Levine compared its rhetorizer, which constructs sentences from human prompts, with ChatGPT. They used Joseph Adams's dependence on the device and its generic output to illustrate the risks of relying too heavily on generative AI as a writing partner.
