= Ted Reynolds =

Ted Reynolds may refer to:

- Ted Reynolds (writer) (born 1938), American science fiction writer
- Ted Reynolds (broadcaster) (c. 1925–2009), broadcaster on Canadian television and radio
