= You Were Right =

You Were Right may refer to:

- You Were Right (album), a 2013 album by Brendan Benson
- "You Were Right" (Rüfüs song), 2015
- You Were Right (Badly Drawn Boy song), 2002
- "You Were Right", a song by Built to Spill from Keep It Like a Secret
- "You Were Right", a song by Easyworld from This Is Where I Stand

== See also ==
- You Were Right, Joe, a 1957 short story by J. T. McIntosh
