= The Zap Gun =

1967 science-fiction novel by Philip K. Dick

- First-edition cover
- Author: Philip K. Dick
- Cover artist: Jack Gaughan
- Language: English
- Genre: Science fiction
- Publisher: Pyramid Books
- Publication date: January 1967
- Publication place: New York
- Media type: Print (paperback)
- Pages: 176 (first edition)
- OCLC: 2668381

The Zap Gun is a 1967 science fiction novel by American writer Philip K. Dick. It was first published as the two-part serial Project Plowshare in Worlds of Tomorrow in 1965 and 1966, before Pyramid Books issued it in paperback under its present title. The novel originated in a title-first commission devised by Pyramid editor Don Bensen and was written in 1964 during a period of rapid production in Dick's career.

Set in 2004, the novel depicts two rival power blocs that secretly maintain a fictitious arms race while converting supposed weapons into consumer products. When extraterrestrial slavers attack Earth, the governments must rely on rival weapons designers Lars Powderdry and Lilo Topchev to produce a genuine defense. Their efforts eventually lead to an empathic device that defeats the invaders by forcing them to experience the suffering they inflict.

Critics have interpreted The Zap Gun as a satire of Cold War militarism, consumer culture, institutional deception, and the construction of artificial political realities. Its use of bureaucratic language, comic-strip imagery, abrupt tonal changes, and unstable narrative structure has also been discussed as characteristic of Dick's satirical method. Reviews have been divided: some critics praised the novel's inventiveness, political observations, and comedy, while others regarded it as disorganized, overextended, or less successful than Dick's strongest work.

== Background and publication ==
The origins of The Zap Gun lay partly in a title-first commissioning practice at Pyramid Books. In a 1963 letter, Pyramid editor D. R. Bensen wrote that paperback publishers often favored titles that were immediately recognizable as science fiction and that he sometimes responded by devising titles before suggesting books to fit them. He named Space Opera and The Zap Gun as examples, associating the latter with a proposed novel about the twenty-first-century armaments industry. The Encyclopedia of Science Fiction reports that Bensen later recalled commissioning Jack Vance and Philip K. Dick to write novels corresponding to the two titles, respectively.

The novel was written in 1964, with Dick's biographer Lawrence Sutin dating its composition more specifically to March and April, when Dick was also writing The Penultimate Truth. Sutin places the two novels within a period of unusually rapid production undertaken under financial pressure. He states that Dick wrote them with the aid of amphetamines during the final breakup of his marriage to Anne Dick, and reports Dick's claim that he produced approximately 1,200 pages in three weeks during this broader period.

The novel first appeared under the title Project Plowshare as a two-part serial in Worlds of Tomorrow. The first installment appeared in November 1965, followed by the concluding installment in January 1966. Both issues were edited by Frederik Pohl and published by Galaxy Publishing Corporation.

Pyramid Books published the novel in book form as The Zap Gun in January 1967. Jack Gaughan created the cover art for the edition. Among later English-language editions were a Panther edition published in 1975, a Bluejay reissue in 1985, and a Vintage edition in 2002. Reviewing the Vintage edition, Aaron Parrett suggested that the publication of Dick's work by Vintage might indicate growing recognition of his literary complexity and craftsmanship.

== Plot ==
The novel is set in 2004, two years after the governments of the world's two major power blocs secretly end their arms race. To the public, Wes-bloc and Peep-East remain engaged in a continuing Cold War. Under the Plowshare Protocols, both sides announce increasingly powerful weapons while privately ensuring that the designs are not developed for military use. Instead, engineers convert, or "plowshare", them into consumer products, toys, household devices, and other novelties. Only officials within the two governments know that the apparent military competition is largely fictitious.

Lars Powderdry, professionally known as Mr. Lars, is Wes-bloc's principal weapons fashion designer. His Peep-East counterpart is Lilo Topchev. Both enter drug-assisted trance states in which they produce sketches that engineers subsequently interpret as weapon designs. Lars operates a company with offices in New York and Paris, the latter managed by his colleague and mistress, Maren Faine. Although wealthy and publicly celebrated, Lars is dissatisfied with his role and fears that he may eventually enter a trance without producing a design. He is also preoccupied with Lilo, whom he has never met.

Surley G. Febbs, an employee of a savings and loan company in Boise, is selected as one of six "average consumers", or concomodies, assigned to the UN-W Natsec Board. Febbs regards the appointment as an opportunity to expose what he considers government corruption and to acquire political influence. He disputes the decisions of the military and administrative officials on the board and later begins organizing the other concomodies independently.

The Plowshare system becomes a liability when unidentified satellites appear above Earth. Wes-bloc officials initially cannot determine whether they are Peep-East weapons or extraterrestrial objects. New Orleans is enclosed beneath an opaque gray field, and its population disappears from contact; additional populated areas are subsequently taken. The governments eventually learn that the attackers are slavers from the Sirius system. Because neither bloc has maintained functional advanced weapons, the two governments turn to Lars and Lilo in the hope that they can produce a genuine defensive design.

The two designers are brought together despite the distrust between their governments. During their first meeting, Lilo attempts to kill Lars, but they continue working together as the alien attacks intensify. Their trance sessions fail to produce a usable weapon. Lars also discovers that designs created by the two mediums appear in The Blue Cephalopod Man from Titan, a motion comic produced by the Italian artist Oral Giacomini. Their supposed inventions are therefore not independent creations, and the officials cannot obtain a practical weapon simply by intensifying their usual trance procedures.

After Lars returns to New York with Lilo, Maren learns of their relationship and confronts them while carrying a small pistol. She fires at Lilo, but Maren herself is fatally wounded. Lars enters a fugue state believing that Lilo has been killed and later regains awareness in Seattle. General Nitz informs him that Lilo survived and that Maren died several hours after the shooting. Lars returns to Washington, where officials have begun investigating Ricardo Hastings, an apparently senile old man who claims to have served in a future war against the Sirius slavers.

Hastings says that humanity defeated the aliens with a Time Warpage Generator and that prolonged exposure to the device carried him from 2068 into the past. Lilo enters a trance near him but repeatedly sketches what appears to be the internal structure of an android. Lars initially concludes that Hastings is an artificial person, although examination of a tissue sample identifies it as human tissue more than a century old. Lars and Lilo then take increased doses of their trance-inducing drugs and establish direct contact with Hastings.

During the trance, Hastings identifies himself as an elderly version of Vincent Klug, a contemporary toy designer. Klug explains that the story about defeating the aliens with a time weapon is false. Because providing knowledge from the future would alter the events that brought him into the past, he can only direct Lars toward something that already exists in 2004. From Klug's answers and a phrase written during the trance, Lars determines that the relevant object is a maze toy whose prototype was constructed for Klug by Pete Freid of Lanferman Associates.

The toy contains a small creature trapped inside a constantly shifting maze. Its controls allow the player to increase or decrease the difficulty of the creature's escape, while a low-powered telepathic circuit causes the player to share the creature's distress. Lars proposes increasing the strength of this connection and altering the controls so that an operator becomes unable to separate psychologically from the trapped creature. Lanferman Associates modifies and mass-produces the device, placing copies where the aliens will acquire them along with captured human populations. Exposure to the strengthened empathic circuit causes the alien operators to undergo mental collapse, and the Sirius satellites withdraw from Earth.

After the invasion, Lars lives with Lilo but continues to grieve for Maren. He considers killing himself with three Formophane tablets supplied by Lilo, but spits them out after she asks him to consult Ol' Orville, a telepathic household device created from one of his earlier weapon designs. Lars decides to remain with Lilo.

Febbs meanwhile organizes the five other concomodies into a clandestine political group. They secretly obtain the separate components of a functional weapon and reassemble it, after which Febbs uses it to kill the other five members. A parcel then arrives containing a modified version of Klug's maze. When Febbs activates it, the device causes him to identify completely with the creature trapped inside, leaving him in a state of permanent psychotic withdrawal. The novel ends as KACH official Don Packard completes his report on Febbs and receives another registered parcel.

== Themes and analysis ==
=== Cold War and consumer culture ===
The novel's fictitious weapons industry has been interpreted as a parody of the Cold War arms race and of the political assumptions that sustained it. Brian Stableford and David Langford characterize the novel as mocking the psychology of weapon-centered power fantasies, while Gregg Rickman places it among Dick's works that treat the Cold War as a manufactured hoax. In these readings, military competition functions not as a response to external danger but as a system maintained by governments whose authority depends upon the appearance of continuing conflict. The Plowshare arrangement allows each bloc to preserve the institutions and public rituals of an arms race after its military purpose has disappeared.

The conversion of supposed weapons into consumer products joins the novel's political satire to its treatment of commercial culture. Adam Gopnik describes this process as characteristic of Dick's penchant for carrying contemporary institutions and assumptions to absurd extremes: weapon designs become toys, ashtrays, and other marketable objects, while entertainment and consumption make organized violence appear normal. The weapons designers themselves occupy a celebrity role within this system, producing images valued less for practical use than for their effect upon the public. Aaron Parrett reads the novel as overtly anti-war and suggests that its treatment of militarism may reflect the increasing United States involvement in the Vietnam War.

=== Institutional deception and simulation ===
The novel's political order depends upon cooperation between institutions that publicly appear separate or opposed. Parrett interprets its corporations and government agencies as having effectively merged, with commercial production, political administration, and military propaganda functioning as parts of the same system. He describes this arrangement as an early postmodern treatment of an established dystopian idea, comparing the novel's accessible conspiracy narrative with later fiction by Thomas Pynchon and David Foster Wallace. In Parrett's reading, the deception is not confined to false weapons but shapes the employment of the designers, the manufacture of consumer goods, the operation of the media, and the public's understanding of international politics.

Lawrence Sutin compares The Zap Gun with The Penultimate Truth, observing that both novels depict governments preserving power by surrounding their populations with artificial media realities. In The Zap Gun, the arrangement has also become normal to many of the officials who maintain it. Bruce Gillespie interprets the setting as a fabricated world whose inhabitants accept its assumptions until the arrival of the Sirians introduces events that cannot be contained within the existing deception. For Gillespie, the alien attack exposes the political system's inability to distinguish its simulations from operational reality. Umberto Rossi similarly includes the novel in his discussion of simulation throughout Dick's fiction, identifying its particular form of artifice as a consequence of industrial design.

=== Satire and narrative instability ===
The novel's satire is carried through its language, names, invented products, and abrupt shifts in tone as much as through its political premise. Judith Merril associated Dick's technique with pop art and comic strips, emphasizing its bright surfaces, movement, timing, deliberate gaps, and simplified characterization. In her reading, these devices allow the novel to operate primarily as a vehicle for ideas rather than as a conventionally realistic narrative. Parrett likewise points to the bureaucratic jargon, unusual character names, and weapons named after saints as important parts of Dick's satirical method. The motion comic within the plot further connects mass-produced entertainment with the novel's treatment of technological invention.

The apparent simplicity of the satire is disrupted by repeated changes in structure and tone. Richard Geis argues that the story initially resembles conventional science fiction but gradually unsettles that expectation as its exaggerated comedy is complicated by comparatively realistic characters and changes in narrative direction. The alien invasion appears to replace the fraudulent arms race with a conventional external conflict, but the failure of the weapons designers, the role of the motion comic, and the intervention of the future Vincent Klug prevent the narrative from becoming a straightforward military adventure.

Gillespie treats this instability as central to the novel rather than as incidental disorder. He argues that the jargon, fragmented syntax, paranoia, and apparent incoherence of the opening prepare the reader for the increasingly disordered world that follows. In his interpretation, the novel explores its premises rather than developing a single political or philosophical argument in an orderly fashion. He also reads the motion comic material as a reflection upon Dick's artistic method: the narrative's absurdity corresponds to a society whose accepted values have themselves become irrational. Geis similarly regards the movement among farce, political satire, personal crisis, and alien invasion as part of the uncertainty produced by the novel.

== Reception ==
Critical responses to The Zap Gun have been divided. Reviewing the novel in The Magazine of Fantasy & Science Fiction in November 1967, Judith Merril placed it among Dick's recent works that she considered politically and sociologically observant, colorful, and ambitious. She nevertheless found that these novels could be garbled and incompletely realized, and her assessment of The Zap Gun combined appreciation of its ideas and technique with reservations about its execution.

Other contemporary specialist responses showed a similar division. Richard E. Geis criticized the novel for leaving unexplained both the economics of its fictitious weapons industry and the reasons the two power blocs continued deceiving their populations. Despite these objections, he responded favorably to its satire and uncertainty, regarding Dick's fiction as challenging rather than merely confusing. Bruce Gillespie found approximately the first 40 pages extremely difficult and considered the novel unsuitable as an introduction to Dick's work. Once the story developed, however, he judged it one of Dick's most exciting and unusual novels and nearly one of his best.

Later assessments remained sharply divided. Reviewing the 1985 Bluejay reissue, Kirkus Reviews called the novel hardworking but meandering and heavily padded. The review also described it as thin, sluggish, and overly dependent on dialogue, concluding that it would appeal principally to readers already interested in Dick. Lawrence Sutin offered a substantially more favorable judgment in his biography of Dick. Although he acknowledged gaps in the plot and awkwardness in the prose, he considered the novel highly inventive and comic, describing it as "hilarious and wildly brilliant".

In a 2003 retrospective review, Aaron Parrett praised Dick's satire and regarded the novel's use of comic-book imagery, psychotropic drugs, and anti-war concerns as unusually precocious for the 1960s. He also suggested that Vintage's publication of the novel reflected growing recognition of Dick's literary complexity and craftsmanship. The Encyclopedia of Science Fiction later placed The Zap Gun among a group of Dick's mid-1960s novels that its contributors considered less fully successful than his immediately preceding major works, while still containing material of cultural and psychological interest.
