= How We Went to Mars =

1938 short story by Arthur C. Clarke

"How We Went to Mars" is a humorous short story by British writer Arthur C. Clarke. It was first published in March 1938, in the third and final issue of Amateur Science Stories magazine. It follows a group of British rocket scientists who travel to Mars and their interactions with Martian society. It was awarded the 1939 Retro Hugo at Loncon 3 in 2014.

The short story was published in Czech in the collection "Direction of Time" (Polaris, 2002) translated by Petr Caha.
