= Ker-Plop =

- Short story by Ted Reynolds
- Country: United States
- Language: English
- Genre: Science fiction short story

Publication
- Media type: Print (Newspaper, Magazine, Hardback & Paperback)
- Publication date: 1979

"Ker-Plop" is a science fiction novella by Ted Reynolds, which first appeared in Isaac Asimov's Science Fiction Magazine, January 1979.

== Synopsis ==
Cotter Oren is a checker-pilot, an elite group tasked to 'meet and greet' travellers from deep space who arrive in the automatic net around the planet Randar. His job is to locate and remove the arriving ship's 'sealsafe', thus nullifying any possible hostile intent, and sending the passengers and crew to the surface for psychotherapy, which most require after their long journeys. But during one shift, he is ordered by Flynn Rose, his controller, to check a ship which is supposedly of five thousand kilometers radius - unimaginably large, and therefore considered to be potentially hostile.

On returning from this mission, he is debriefed under hypnosis by an official known as The Examiner. He tries to recall the events of his journey into the ship...

Oren approaches cautiously in his miniaturised checkership, lands and is able to enter via an airlock. A still-functioning security system directs him to remove and deposit his checker-suit and weapons (which render the user invulnerable to almost any attack) and he continues on his way to the ship's centre of gravity, where the sealsafe must be located.

Cotter meets various inhabitants, none of whom exhibit any curiosity and are apparently unaware that their planet is really a spaceship. He sees no evidence of any government or officials in charge. He realises that the ship is populated in three dimensions.

Reaching the ship's core, he meets a man, who identifies himself only as Basho and describes himself as a janitor. Basho explains that the planet, known as Golgaronok, has now returned from the Magellanic Clouds - a journey that started 300,000 years ago. It is a remnant of a former galactic confederation known as the Amalgamate. Basho forces Oren to mentally calculate the living space and possible population of the ship; Oren, with increasing panic, realises that the population could be many times greater than that of the galactic confederation of which Randar is a part.

Basho persuades Oren that, rather than Randar accepting the arrival of Golgaronok, the latter should in fact absorb Randar. Oren then realises that he has been hypnotised by Basho and that Basho is pumping him for information. The Examiner is actually Basho and he is still within the planet-ship.

Old Pond / Frog Jumps / Ker-Plop!

Matsuo Basho

== Sources ==
"Ker-Plop", by Ted Reynolds. Published 1979.
