= The Curse (Clarke story) =

Short story by Arthur C. Clarke

"The Curse" (also called "Nightfall") is a postapocalyptic short story by English writer Arthur C. Clarke, first published in 1946.

== Plot summary ==
The story is set in the immediate aftermath of a global nuclear war that has wiped out mankind and describes in great detail the devastation it has caused to a small town. In the end, the town is revealed as Stratford-upon-Avon, with the epitaph on the grave of William Shakespeare providing both the location and the title of the story.

Employing a third-person objective narrator and a very matter-of-fact style, the story achieves a chilling effect despite completely omitting descriptions of human tragedy and suffering. Instead, it merely shows the bleakness of the completely depopulated ruins of the town and surrounding landscape, interspersed with sparse hints of how its destruction fit into the global events. Concepts like mutual assured destruction, nuclear overkill and (insufficient) missile defence systems are also hinted at.
