= The Simulacra =

1964 novel by Philip K. Dick

- Cover of first edition (paperback)
- Author: Philip K. Dick
- Illustrator: Emsh
- Cover artist: Emsh
- Language: English
- Genre: Science fiction
- Publisher: Ace Books
- Publication date: 1964
- Publication place: United States
- Media type: Print (hardback & paperback)
- Pages: 192

The Simulacra is a 1964 science fiction novel by American writer Philip K. Dick. The novel portrays a future totalitarian society apparently dominated by a matriarch, Nicole Thibodeaux. It revolves around the themes of reality and illusionary beliefs, as do many of Dick's works. Additionally, it touches on Nazi ideology.

== Publication ==
Dick originally published the story as a novelette in the magazine Fantastic, titled "The Novelty Act". He expanded the plot and titled the novel First Lady of Earth. Before publication, the title was changed to The Simulacra. The novel was originally published in 1964 as a paperback by Ace Books. It was one of four novels released by Dick that year.

== Setting ==
Set in the middle of the twenty-first century, after World War Three, The Simulacra is the story of several protagonists within the United States of Europe and America (USEA), formed by the merger of (West) Germany and the United States, where the whole government is a fraud and the President (der Alte, "the Old Man") is a simulacrum (android). Other global superpowers are the French Empire, the People's Republic of China and Free (Black) Africa. The war may have involved tactical nuclear weapons. Poland has become the global focus of communist authority, with its administrative centre in Warsaw.

Society is stratified into 'Ges' (German Geheimnisträger, "bearers of the secret" (the elite)) and 'Bes' (German Befehlsträger, "implementers of instruction" (professional and artisanal)) classes. Political and broadcast media power are highly consolidated. The Democratic and Republican parties have merged to become the 'Democrat-Republican Party' and the networks have amalgamated into the 'United Triadic Network'.

Actual political power has devolved to a permanent First Lady, Nicole Thibodeaux, whose consorts are a series of male presidents – die Alten. The current Alte, Rudi Kalbfleisch, is a simulacrum. Since the death of the original "Nicole", her role has been portrayed by four consecutive human actors, the latest of which is Kate Rupert. This is the Geheimnis (secret), possession of which ensures the conferral of elite Ges status. A secretive governing council controls the USEA; the manufacturer of the current der Alte-simulacrum, exerts some influence.

== Plot ==
Kalbfleisch, whom Nicole dislikes, appears only momentarily in the story; because of planned obsolescence, he will soon suffer a heart attack and be replaced. The contract for the next simulacrum, Dieter Hogbein, has been awarded to 'Frauenzimmer Associates', and the previous contractor, 'Karp und Söhne Werke' is unhappy about this change. One subplot involves the Karp und Söhne Werke threatening exposure of what has been a state secret over the last five decades.

A. G. Chemie, the leading USEA psycho-pharmaceutical drug cartel, has engineered the prohibition of psychotherapy under the "MacPhearson Act." However, the USEA is willing to let Doctor Egon Superb continue to treat Richard Kongrosian, a well known pianist who performs in the White House, and who holds the delusory belief that his body odor is lethal. Kongrosian can play piano using only his telekinetic abilities; Nicole Thibodeaux is anxious to keep him under control, as are Wilder Pembroke, head of the National Police, and members of the covert national governance council.

Bertold Goltz, an alleged neofascist, is seemingly trying to overthrow the government, and runs the 'Sons of Job', a religious paramilitary organisation. Actually, he is head of the covert USEA governing council.

There is a subplot that involves Charles (Chic) Strikerock, Vince, his brother and a cut-price colonisation spacecraft sales firm (known as "Loony Lukes") involved in Martian colonisation. Mars boasts insectoid life, the sentient and empathic 'papoola', while Ganymede is inhabited by multicellular primitive life forms.

As the plot develops, the der Alte-simulacrum is revealed as an android and Kate/Nicole is disclosed as an impostor, this undoing the raison d'etre for ges/bes class stratification. Bertold Goltz is killed by a National Police detachment, as is the rest of the covert governing council. Using telekinesis, Kongrosian kills Pembroke before he can overthrow Nicole in a coup d'état and teleports her to safety at his secluded Northern US home.

Karp und Sohnen rebel against the abortive coup, however, and soon the National Police and USEA armed forces are engaged in civil war, with active use of low-yield nuclear weapons. Re-emerging Neanderthals (or "chuppers"), happy at this turn of events, gather near Kongrosian's home in anticipation that self-destruction of Homo sapiens might give them another opportunity to dominate Earth. The novel ends before the action concludes.

== Sources ==
- Rossi, Umberto, “The Great National Disaster: The Destruction of Imperial America in P.K. Dick’s The Simulacra”, RSA: Rivista di Studi Nord Americani #13/2002, pp. 22–39.
- Tuck, Donald H. (1974). The Encyclopedia of Science Fiction and Fantasy. Chicago: Advent. p. 142. ISBN 0-911682-20-1.
