= Cosmic Kaleidoscope =

1976 short story collection by Bob Shaw

- First US edition cover
- Author: Bob Shaw
- Genre: Science fiction; Short stories
- Publisher: Victor Gollancz Ltd
- Publication date: 1976
- ISBN: 0-330-25294-1

Cosmic Kaleidoscope (ISBN 0-330-25294-1) is a collection of science fiction short stories by Bob Shaw, published in 1976 by Gollancz in the UK and in 1977 by Doubleday in the US.

It contains:

- "Skirmish on a Summer Morning"
- "Unreasonable Facsimile"
- "A Full Member of the Club"
- "The Silent Partners"
- "The Giaconda Caper"
- "An Uncomic Book Horror Story"
- "The Brink"
- "Waltz of the Bodysnatchers"
- "A Little Night Flying"

== Reception ==
Maciej Parowski reviewed the collection's Polish edition, published in 1983, in Fantastyka (10/83, p. 51).
