= Polly Plus =

- Short story by Randall Garrett
- Language: English

Publication
- Published in: Asimov's Science Fiction
- Publication date: 1978

"Polly Plus" is a science fiction short story by Randall Garrett, originally published in Asimov's Science Fiction in 1978.

== Plot summary ==
The story is narrated by a teacher many years after she started teaching at an elementary school. She recalls her experience on her first day, meeting her pupils. One of them is a young boy named Willy Taylor, who exhibits unusual intelligence. But his teacher comes to realise that he is hiding his real abilities and pretending to be an average student only.

She allows Willy to take home a class pet; a parrot named Jeremiah, but the parrot is attacked and mutilated by a neighbour's cat. Nevertheless. Jeremiah is returned to school, apparently unharmed. But he quickly begins to exhibit enhanced abilities, including mathematical knowledge and advanced reasoning. The teacher determines to investigate this phenomenon intensively, maybe even obtaining a doctorate for her research.

Some time later, Paula, a young and not-too-bright fellow pupil of Willy's, is run over in a car accident and is not expected to survive. Willy manages to enter the hospital without being seen, and Paula seemingly and miraculously recovers. Willy is taken out of school next day and is never seen again.

Years later, Paula is a successful film actress with multiple talents and several university degrees. The teacher speculates that Willy and his family were extraterrestrials with special powers, and were living on Earth, for unknown reasons. Willy, she believes, 'enhanced' the brainpower of both Paula and Jeremiah.
