= Ullward's Retreat =

- Short story by Jack Vance
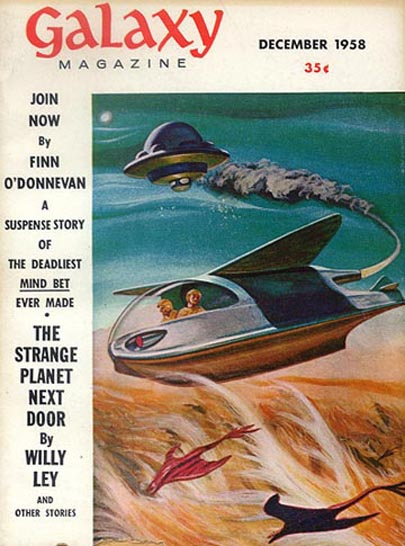
- Genre(s): Science fiction

Publication
- Published in: Galaxy
- Publication date: December 1958

"Ullward's Retreat" is a science fiction novelette by American writer Jack Vance, first published in the December 1958 issue of Galaxy magazine. In the preface to the story in the anthology The Best of Jack Vance, the author stated that this was one of his favorite stories.

On an overcrowded Earth, privacy and living space is at a premium. To impress his friends, a wealthy man named Ullward leases a continent from a spaceman who has laid claim to an entire habitable world, but the result is not what he had hoped for.
