= Amateur Science Stories =

Science fiction fanzine

Amateur Science Stories was a short-lived (three issues) science fiction fanzine notable for publishing Arthur C. Clarke's first stories, including "Travel by Wire!", "Retreat from Earth" and "How We Went to Mars". The latter story won the 1939 Retro Hugo, awarded at the 72nd World Science Fiction Convention in 2014.

It was edited by Douglas W. F. Mayer and published by The Science Fiction Association at Leeds, England, from October 1937 through March 1938. Other authors whose early work appeared in its pages include William F. Temple and Eric C. Williams.
