= Christopher Cherniak =

American philosopher of neuroscience (1945-2025)

Christopher G. Cherniak
- Born: May 5, 1945; Cambridge, Massachusetts, US
- Died: March 13, 2025 (aged 79); Washington, D.C., US

Academic background
- Education: Harvard College; University of Oxford; University of California, Berkeley
- Thesis: Beliefs and logical abilities (1977)

Christopher George Cherniak (May 5, 1945 – March 13, 2025) was an American philosopher who specialized in epistemology and the philosophy of neuroscience. He was a long-time member of the University of Maryland Philosophy Department. Cherniak's research trajectory started in theory of knowledge and led into computational neuroanatomy and genomics. The underlying linkage between the areas concerns models of the agent: The work began with more realistic, bounded-resource models of rationality. From this epistemology in turn stemmed a research program concerning optimal-wiring models of global brain and genome anatomy, a structuralist approach.

== Life and career ==
Cherniak was born in Cambridge, Massachusetts and attended Melbourne High School in Florida while his father was working as an aeronautical engineer at Cape Canarveral as director of flight tests at Space Technology Laboratories. He won the top prize at the Science Talent Search in 1962 and won a scholarship to attend Harvard College, where he graduated in 1966. He studied at Christ Church, University of Oxford and received an MA in philosophy in 1973. His M.Litt. thesis, titled Pragmatism and Realism, was supervised by David Pears.

After his stay in the UK, Cherniak moved to the University of California, Berkeley to study philosophy and obtained his PhD in 1977. His doctoral thesis, titled Beliefs and logical abilities. His M.Litt. and PhD theses became the groundwork for his book Minimal Rationality, published in 1986. Cherniak became a faculty member at Tufts University and later moved to the University of Maryland, College Park, where he was a professor of philosophy until his retirement.

== Research ==
=== Minimal agents ===
Cherniak's monograph Minimal Rationality states that perhaps the most fundamental psychological law is that humans are finite beings. Bounded-resource models of the agent characterize human rationality as falling between nothing and perfection. The aperçu motivating the rationality critiques is conveyed by the realization that standard idealizations entail some deductive omniscience - for instance, triviality of portions of the deductive sciences. Such ideal agent/logicians, if computational, would have to violate Church's Theorem on undecidability of first-order logic. This insight in turn indicates that NP-completeness is of parallel interest: computational intractability of a cosmos-consuming scale is a practical counterpart to traditional absolute uncomputability - another layer of impossibility for the idealizations. This is part of the philosophical significance of computational complexity.

This research program proceeds from a holistic rather than compartmentalized perspective, where in an inherent ambiguity philosophy and science are distinct but inextricably interconnected. For instance, the classical paradoxes of semantics (e.g., the Liar Paradox) and set theory (e.g., Russell's Paradox) can be reexamined not as inherently contradictory, but instead as signs of use of “quick and dirty heuristics” - that is, speed-reliability tradeoffs of correctness for feasibility. Three disparate fields thereby converge: (a) computational complexity theory, (b) empirical psychology of quick and dirty heuristics, (c) philosophical theory of bounded-resource rationality. In this way, the bounded rationality models serve as a foundation of current “behavioral economics”.

=== Brainwiring optimization ===
In addition, it is perhaps natural to extend the bounded-resource approach along these lines down from philosophical rationality to the physical brainwiring hardware level (and its associated organic neuroanatomy). In particular, longrange connectivity is a critically constrained neural resource, with strong evolutionary pressure to employ efficiently. Connection minimization seems a first law of brain tractography, an organizing principle driving neuroanatomy.

The Cherniak laboratory has therefore been gauging how well wiring-optimization ideas from computer microchip design apply to brain structure. "Save wire" turns out to be a strongly predictive model. Wiring minimization can be detected at multiple levels (e.g., placement of the entire brain, layout of its ganglia and/or cortex areas, subcellular architecture of dendrite arbors, etc.). Much of this biological structure seems to arise "for free, directly from physics".

A key specific wiring problem is component placement optimization: Given a set of interconnected components, what are the positionings of the components that minimize total connection costs (e.g., wirelength)? This concept seems to account quite precisely for aspects of neuroanatomy at multiple hierarchical levels. For instance, the nervous system of the roundworm Caenorhabditis elegans includes eleven ganglionic components, which have 11! (~40,000,000) alternative possible anteroposterior orderings. In fact, the actual here is the ideal, in that the actual layout turns out to require the minimum total wirelength, a predictive success story. However, such problems are NP-complete; exact solutions generally appear to entail bruteforce searches, with exponentially exploding costs. Despite local minimum traps, this neuroanatomy optimization can be approximated well by “mesh of springs” energy-minimization mechanisms. (Cf. discussion below of the “genomic bottleneck”.)

A corresponding approach can be applied to placement of interconnected functional areas of cerebral cortex. A first strategy is to use a simpler connection cost measure, conformance of a cortex layout to a wire-saving Adjacency Heuristic: If components are connected, then they are placed adjacent to each other. Sampling of all possible layouts is still required to verify the best ones. For 17 core visual areas of macaque cortex, the actual layout of this subsystem ranks in the top 10^{−7} layouts best minimizing their adjacency costing. Similar high optimality rankings also hold for the core set of visual areas of cat cortex, and also for rat olfactory cortex and amygdala.

In addition, a “Size Law” appears to apply to systems with such local-global tradeoffs: If a complete system is in fact perfectly optimized, then the smaller the subset of it evaluated by itself, the poorer the optimization tends to appear. (This is a generalization of a related perspective-dependent idea seen in theology, to account for the problem of evil – of apparent imperfections in the Universe with an omnipotent, benevolent deity.) The Size Law applies well to each of the above cortex systems, as well as elsewhere (e.g., for microchip design).

With such a network optimization framework, these “Save wire” results have been extended and replicated for the complete living human cerebrum via fMRI, another predictive success.

Neuron dendrite and axon arbors also appear significantly to approximate minimum-cost Steiner trees. These structures are derivable via fluid dynamics. This seems to constitute some of the most complex biostructure presently obtainable from simple (non-DNA) physical processes. Such a “Physics suffices” account of biological morphogenesis constitutes a “Nongenomic Nativism”. One rationale for the pre-biotic pervading the biotic in this way is to cope with the “genomic bottleneck”: Like other organism systems, the genome has limited capacities. So the more neuroanatomy “for free, directly from physics”, the less the genome information-carrying load.

Another question arises: Neural wiring minimization is of course valuable, but why should it seem to have such a high priority – sometimes apparently near-maximal? The significance of ultra-fine neural optimization remains an open question.

An additional issue concerns how the intentional level of mind meshes with the hardware level of brain. Prima facie, that relationship appears in tension: In some aspects, the brainwiring appears virtually perfectly optimized, yet the rationality has layers of impossibility between it and perfection. Perhaps this is another manifestation of irreducibility of the mental – the well-known poor fit of the two domains with each other.

=== Genome as nanobrain ===
A next chapter of this research program: Concepts from the theory of computation can be applied to understand the structure and function of organisms' DNA. The Crick-Watson double-helix model emerged at the same place and time as Turing's final work, namely Cambridge around 1950, so the idea of DNA-as-Turing-machine-tape has floated around for decades.

In particular, the genome can be treated like a "nano-brain” or pico-computer to see whether similar connection minimization strategies also appear in gene networks. As sketched above, for decades, wiring optimization in the brain has been reported that begins to approach some of the most precisely confirmed predictions in neuroscience.

Now a connection-minimization idea is being explored for the human genome. Information transmission may not be cost-free even within a cell, nucleus, or genome. For example, a statistically significant supra-chromosomal homunculus – a global representation of the human body - appears to extend over the entire genome in the nucleus. This is a strategy for connection cost minimization (e.g., cf. body maps reported in sensory and motor cortex since the 19th century). In addition, finer-scale somatotopic mappings seem to occur on individual autosomal chromosomes.
