= The Mold of Yancy =

1955 short story by Philip K. Dick

"The Mold of Yancy" is a political science fiction novelette by American writer Philip K. Dick, first published in 1955. It is published in volume four of The Collected Stories of Philip K. Dick, The Days of Perky Pat.

"The Mold of Yancy" follows an investigation into an off-Earth colony where a seemingly benign totalitarian society has emerged. The eponymous Yancy is a popular public figure who is actually a virtual person, created by teams of 'Yance-men'. All aspects of day-to-day life are commentated on by Yancy through advertisements and broadcast shows, from breakfast cereal to music to politics. The populace of the society are essentially being de-politicized and homogenised by the messages of Yancy. All of Yancy's opinions are the least controversial possible; the way his speech is written appears to be profound, yet the content is such that very little is being said.

In the author's notes for this short story, it is mentioned that the Yancy character was roughly based on U.S. President Dwight D. Eisenhower.

== See also ==
- The Penultimate Truth
