= Skirmish on a Summer Morning =

Skirmish on a Summer Morning is a 1976 science fiction Western novelette by Bob Shaw, combining the elements of science fiction (specifically, time travel) and Western.

It was published in the collection Cosmic Kaleidoscope.

== Plot ==
Billy Gregg, a middle-aged resident of late 19th-century rural Arizona, had tried to defy Josh Potland, a local strongman, which led to his being cruelly tortured and left crippled. In the aftermath, he sees no alternative but to stay cautiously on his farm, take no further stand and draw no further attention to himself. One day he encounters a strange young woman, dressed in curious silver clothing and heavily pregnant, who is hassled by two of Potland's cowboys. Against his better judgement, he saves her, in the process wounding one of the cowboys, and offers her refuge – of which she is clearly in dire need – on his farm.

This draws to him once again the highly unwelcome attention of Potland and his gang, who seek revenge and also feel that Gregg is "too old for such choice woman-flesh". And even the threat they pose is dwarfed by that of the sinister "Hunter", a faceless figure shrouded in a dark aura, who relentlessly hunts Morna. If she is to be believed, he was sent by ancient enemies who have been fighting Morna's people (whoever they might be) for twenty thousand years.

Though highly vulnerable when her time for giving birth arrives, Morna is not without resource. She provides Gregg with a gun far superior in firepower to anything known in the West (or anywhere in the world of the 1880s). If the inscription on the cartridge box is to be believed, it comes from 1981, a hundred years in the future. With such a weapon in his hand, Gregg just might have a chance to win an epic gunfight which would eclipse even the recent one at OK Corral.
