= Men Without Bones =

- Short story by Gerald Kersh
- Language: English
- Genres: Horror, science fiction

Publication
- Published in: Esquire
- Publication type: magazine
- Media type: paperback
- Publication date: August 1954

"Men Without Bones" is a 1954 horror short story by British writer Gerald Kersh.

== Plot summary ==
A passenger on a banana boat called the Claire Dodge at Puerto Pobre, sees a feverish-looking little man. Everyone believes the man is mad. The man asks for passage. He introduces himself as Goodbody, Doctor of Science of Osbaldeston University. He was an assistant of Professor Yeoward, who was lost in the upland jungle beyond the source of the Amer River. He begs to be allowed to leave, to escape the "men without bones".

He tells about their lost expedition, which had bad luck, losing two canoes and half their supplies at the Anaña Rapids. They also lost Doctor Terry, Jack Lambert, and eight carriers. They made friends with the Ahu Indians and bribed them to carry their remaining belongings westward through the jungle. The object of Professor Yeoward's expedition was to investigate a series of Indian folk tales that tallied. Legends of a race of gods that came down from the sky in a great flame when the world was very young.

They found the nameless place, called a 'bad place' by the Ahu. They refuse to accompany them. The two venture on through thirty miles of jungle, making about a quarter of a mile a day.

Finally, they reach a plateau and climb the slope. There they spot the remains of a gigantic machine. Originally it had a pear-shape, at least a thousand feet long and, in its widest part, six hundred feet in diameter. The impact of its landing had made a great valley in the middle of the plateau. The metal is so old that it turns to powder at their touch.

On the third day, Yeoward finds a semi-circular plate of hard metal, covered with diagrams. After several days study, Yeoward recognizes it as a star chart, and a chart of a course from Mars to Earth.

That night the boneless things surround their camp. Goodbody shoots one and the rest scatter. At dawn, they find the corpse, which was "grey and, in texture, tough and gelatinous. Yet, in form, externally, it was not unlike a human being. It had eyes, and there were either vestiges—or rudiments—of head, and neck, and a kind of limbs." Goodbody is instinctively afraid of the thing. He dissects the thing reluctantly. It has "a kind of digestive system enclosed in very tough jelly, a rudimentary nervous system, and a brain about the size of a walnut." The entire creature, stretched out, measures four feet long.

As the sun rises, the corpse melts and liquifies, turning to slime. Yeoward starts to avoid Goodbody. On a trip into the jungle, he sees a horde of the boneless things attack and devour a tree sloth. They do not bite, but suck, their color changing from gray to pink and then to brown. He finds that they are afraid of him also.

On his return, he finds that Yeoward has been bitten by a jararaca. He dies two hours later, entrusting Goodbody with the metal star chart. The boneless things return that night and he shoots again and again until they leave. He buries Yeoward and leaves. He has forgotten the way back, however and he becomes thinner and weak. Eventually, he ties the star chart to a tree with liana-vine and goes on.

He reaches the territory of the Ahu, who nurse him back to health. He takes some of the stores they had left and makes his way back to the coast.

The passenger disbelieves the story, believing that the 'boneless men' were Martians. Goodbody counters that "Those boneless things are men. We are Martians!"
