= Manuel Antonio de Rivas =

Manuel Antonio de Rivas was a Franciscan friar in Mérida, a Spanish colonial town on the Yucatán Peninsula. Details of his life are sketchy, though there are court documents that prove that in the 1770s he was accused of heresy. He is best known for an account of a journey of lunar discovery, Syzygies and Lunar Quadratures, which is credited as the first science fiction text written in the Americas.

== Biography ==
Little is known of Rivas's life outside of the trial for heresy; his birth and death dates are unknown, though it appears he was already an old man by the time he was brought to trial. According to Rivas scholar Miguel Ángel Fernández Delgado, he arrived in Yucatán in 1742, and soon started "making enemies and trouble for himself." He deviated from orthodoxy by believing, for instance, that heavenly bodies affected human behavior (denying free will), reading banned books, and criticizing the veneration of saints. Apparently he printed leaflets critical of his fellow churchmen and distributed them. His behavior was so offensive that he was put on trial in 1775, a trial which revealed his speculative book on lunar travel. He was accused of believing in astrology, of proposing a "branch of hell in the Sun's center," and of endorsing the heliocentrism of Nicolaus Copernicus. An accusation of sodomy was dropped quickly. His Syzygies and Lunar Quadratures was one of the main pieces of evidence; fortunately for him, the court judged it to be a fable, and charges were withdrawn.

== Syzygies and Lunar Quadratures ==
=== Textual history ===
The full title of Rivas's 11-folio booklet is translated in English as Syzygies and Lunar Quadratures Aligned to the Meridian of Mérida of the Yucatán by an Anctitone or Inhabitant of the Moon, and Addressed to the Scholar Don Ambrosio de Echevarria, Reciter of Funeral Kyries in the Parish of Jesus of Said City, and Presently Teacher of Logarithm in the Town of Mama of the Yucatán Peninsula, in the Year of the Lord 1775. No actual date of composition is given in the manuscript.

The manuscript was rediscovered in 1958 by Pablo González Casanova, "hidden among the dusty volumes of the National Archives in Mexico City"—in fact, among the documents compiled by the Inquisition pertaining to Rivas's trial. It was referenced in a 1977 study of Mexican literature, but was not commented on or published until 1994. An extensive study of Rivas and his lunar narrative was published in 1995 by Delgado, who published a complete, critical edition of the text in 2001.

=== Genesis ===
Rivas was evidently influenced by European narratives of lunar exploration, including Lucian's True History, Sir Francis Bacon's New Atlantis, Johannes Kepler's Somnium, Francis Godwin's The Man in the Moone, John Wilkins' Discovery of a New World, Cyrano de Bergerac's The Voyage to the Moon, Bernard le Bovier de Fontenelle's Conversations on the Plurality of Worlds, and Voltaire's Micromégas.

=== Contents ===
Syzygies and Lunar Quadratures (syzygy and quadrature are terms in astronomy) consists of two parts—the first is an account of a lunar voyage by a Frenchman, Onésimo Dutalon in epistolary form, and it precedes another letter containing an astronomical almanac. Both are addressed to a Don Ambrosio de Echevarria (an "observer of lunar movements") and are written by "anctitones", the inhabitants of the Moon.

In their first letter, the anctitones write to Echevarria about a visit they received from Onésimo Dutalon, a French astronomer, who had written them a very informative and erudite letter with data about syzygies and quadrature. They are pondering how to respond to the letter when Dutalon shows up on the Moon in a flying vessel, evidently propelled by wings. Dutalon tells them his life story, and shares his astronomical information and, among others, the theories of Isaac Newton and the philosophy of René Descartes—according to Delgado, Dutalon is the "obvious mouthpiece of Rivas." While the president of the Moon university is preparing a welcome speech, an interruption comes in the form of a "legion of space demons", who have stopped on their way to the Sun where they are taking the soul of a materialist. Satan had apparently refused this soul in order to preserve order in his domain; Dutalon explains that hell is actually placed in the Sun, a theory he based on that of an Anglican scholar. The letter is signed by the president of the Moon university.

The anctitones provided fodder for the Inquisition's trial: as it happens, they have studied Earth and its inhabitants for a long time, and question various elements on earthly history. For instance, they have doubts about Biblical chronology, and about "the mythological return of the Messiah". They also recall the legend of Phaëton, whose fiery accident burned the lunar records, forcing them to start their history anew, in "a new Lunar Era," now 7,914,522 years ago.

The second letter contains "strange" anctitone remarks on different Earthly chronologies, and ends with a detailed almanac and notes on stellar observations for the year 1775.

=== English translation ===
The first full English translation of Syzygies and Lunar Quadratures was published in the journal Eleven Eleven in 2015.

== See also ==
- Moon in fiction
