= Lorelei at Storyville West =

- Short story by Sherwood Springer
- Country: United States
- Language: English
- Genre: Science fiction

Publication
- Publication type: Isaac Asimov's Science Fiction Magazine
- Media type: Magazine
- Publication date: Fall 1977

"Lorelei at Storyville West" is a science fiction short story by American writer Sherwood Springer. It was first published in Isaac Asimov's Science Fiction Magazine.

== Plot summary ==
Al Burke, a Los Angeles music copyist and jazz enthusiast, is visited by an author who is researching a book on female jazz singers. He has heard that Al once knew singer Ruby Benton, who he has in vain tried to find out about.

Al, who knew Ruby and had a brief but passionate affair with her, tells for the first time the story he has kept to himself for many years. Ruby was singing at a nightclub and entrancing everyone with her voice, but she refuses to move on to the 'big time'. Al even made a recording of her performance, despite Ruby's protests. She later said farewell and vanished, never to be seen again.

His theory is that Ruby was an agent sent back from a future time to attract jazz trombonist and nuclear researcher (and possible renegade from the future world) Joel Kurzenknabe. That accomplished, she will return to her own time.

Al plays his tape recording. It contains the band that backed Ruby - but there is no voice to be heard.

== Sources ==
"Lorelei at Storyville West", by Sherwood Springer
