= You Were Right, Joe =

1957 short story by J. T. McIntosh

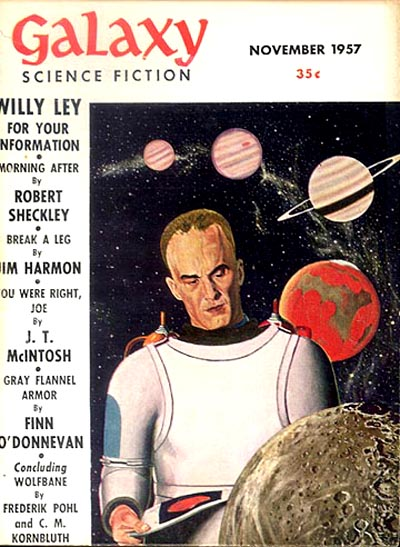
"You Were Right, Joe" was originally published in the November 1957 issue of Galaxy Science Fiction

"You Were Right, Joe" is a 22-page time travel short story by Scottish writer J. T. McIntosh, published in the November 1957 issue of Galaxy Science Fiction.

== Plot summary ==
An unnamed man has had his consciousness sent far into the future by a scientist named Joe. The story is told in the form of messages that are sent by the time traveler using a one-way communication link that exists between the time traveler and the scientist.

The time traveler tells Joe that some of his predictions about time travel and the future are correct. He has arrived in the future with an established identity and is able to speak the local language. The people of the time are friendly and simply dressed. Even though he is clearly in a city, there is little sign of impressive technology. He also reports that he is attracting a fair amount of attention because the body that he now inhabits is tall, strong, handsome and athletic whereas in our time he was something of a weakling.

Another observation that the time traveler makes to Joe is that the people of the future must be pretty mature, as they only need two laws:

- Law #1 – You mustn't annoy other people.
- Law #2 – And if you're other people, you mustn’t allow yourself to be annoyed too easily.

As the time traveler meets people and explores his surroundings his messages to Joe begin to mention strange events where people or creatures from other times (a sabre-tooth tiger, a group of cave men, some people attending a party in 17th century England) appear for a short time and then vanish again.

Eventually, the scientists of the future catch up with the time traveler and tell him that since his arrival they have detected ever increasing disturbances in time - which is the reason for the strange and anachronistic events that have been happening around him. They tell him that these disturbances are a result of the communications link that he has to Joe, back in our time – the link is literally pulling time apart.

The future scientists see a way to remove the threat by severing the link, but their solution turns out to have some rather grim repercussions for Joe...

== See also ==
- Body swap appearances in media
- List of science fiction short stories
