= The Great Nebraska Sea =

- Short story by Allan Danzig
- Genre: Science fiction

Publication
- Publisher: Galaxy Science Fiction
- Publication date: August 1963

"The Great Nebraska Sea" is a science fiction short story by American writer Allan Danzig. It was first published in 1963 in the magazine Galaxy Science Fiction. The story has been extensively collected for anthologies, most recently in 1999 for the collection Armageddons, edited by Jack Dann and Gardner Dozois.

The story was originally written as a spoof history or possibly a future history. The narrator is a historian writing in the year 2073 about events taking place in 1973, 10 years from the story's actual publication date. From the point of view of 21st century readers it is sometimes thought of as an alternate history.

== Plot summary ==
The story begins with an account of how geologists in the mid-1960s came to understand that the "Kiowa fault" in the state of Colorado was actually part of a larger fault system running along the eastern edge of the Rocky Mountains from Texas to the Canada–US border. In the summer of 1973 the land east of the fault slips downward, slowly but inexorably over the next few months, until the major rivers of the region (including the Mississippi) flood the new lowlands. The process is slow enough for people to flee eastwards, though conditions become more and more hazardous as the flooding increases.

The story recounts how, during this time the various authorities such as the Federal government and the State governors, try to quell panic by invoking patriotism or, in the case of the governors, the stalwart nature of the people of the "great Southland".

Despite this, the next act of nature proves even more cataclysmic. The Gulf coast of the United States, from western Florida to Lake Pontchartrain, simply sinks below sea level. The sea floods the new lowlands from the Texas Panhandle to North Dakota. As many as 14 million people perish. The state of Oklahoma is completely lost, as are most of the Dakotas, Kansas, Nebraska, and Arkansas. The Ozarks become an archipelago.

There are tales of amazing escapes mentioned in the story, and of foolishness, as for instance when the governor of Kansas decides to stand fast and is wiped out along with most of his state.

Finally the country is left divided by a new inland sea, almost as big as the Mediterranean. The economy recovers, and the climate of the inner part of the country actually improves due to the moderating effect of this large body of water. The state of Wyoming becomes "a new Riviera" while Missouri is a "second California". Minnesota loses its famously Arctic winters.

The author comments wryly on the political fallout. The states which kept some portion of their land above water eventually demand their full representation in Congress, including two senators each for several states which exist only as slivers of land.

Trade and commerce flourish on the new waterway. Eventually the new sea can be fished to great profit. The story ends with an optimistic view of a vibrant future in which "fleets of all the world sail...where once the prairie schooner made its laborious and dusty way west!".
