= Gene Hive =

1958 short story by Brian Aldiss

"Gene Hive" is a science fiction short story by English author Brian Aldiss. It was first published, as "Journey to the Interior", in 1958 in Nebula Science Fiction #30 and first collected, as "Gene-Hive", in The Canopy of Time (Faber and Faber, 1959)

The story has a scientific approach to the theme of gene-shifting and genetic engineering. It anticipates the central idea of Richard Dawkins' The Selfish Gene (1976) by nearly two decades:

Genes build themselves into cells and cells into the gene hive called man in order to develop their potentialities, not man's. The idea of man's being able to develop was purely an anthropomorphic concept.
