= The New Prime =

1951 novelette by Jack Vance

- First publication as Brain of the Galaxy
- Author: Jack Vance
- Cover artist: H. R. Van Dongen
- Genre: Science fiction
- Publisher: Worlds Beyond
- Publication date: February 1951

"The New Prime" is a science fiction novelette by American writer Jack Vance, first published in the February 1951 issue of Worlds Beyond as "Brain of the Galaxy". In the story, the new leader of the galaxy is chosen using a series of tests.

== Plot summary ==
A man attending a party in 20th century Boston suddenly realizes he is naked. When security guards accost him, he has to decide what to do. Then the scene shifts to a soldier leading his men in a battle against huge insectoid aliens. Next, the retainer to a lord must race against the clock to find a legal document in a crumbling city to save his master from being executed. He is tempted to neglect his mission by an attractive courtesan. An artist competes against others in the creation of imaginative mind compositions. Finally, a man is tortured by secret police, who try to get him to reveal a secret.

It turns out that each of these situations is one of a series of virtual reality tests devised by the Prime, the current leader of the galaxy, to evaluate candidates for his successor. Eleven Elders have the task of either giving the Prime a second term or choosing a new leader. The simulations test various qualities: the ability to think quickly, creativity, loyalty, and so on.

The Prime scores the highest on the tests, but the Elders choose another person. When he asks why, he is told that, because he created the tests, they tested the qualities he considers the most vital, so naturally he won. The Elders, however, feel that the nature of the tests sheds light on his deficiencies, and that other, more empathetic qualities are of greater importance.
