= Getting Real =

- Short story by Harry Turtledove
- Country: United States
- Language: English
- Genres: Science fiction, future history

Publication
- Published in: Asimov's Science Fiction (March 2009 issue)
- Publication type: Print
- Published in English: March 2009

"Getting Real" is a science fiction short story by American writer Harry Turtledove, published in the March 2009 issue of Asimov's Science Fiction Magazine.

== Plot summary ==
The short story takes place in a run down Los Angeles, California in the year 2117 where the United States is no longer a world power but an "economic basket case" ever since China refused to renew its loans to the government a century earlier. As a result, China becomes the world's largest military and economic power, in addition in leading the world in technological research and development.

In an earlier conflict a generation prior to the setting of the short story, China took over Catalina Island and the California Channel Islands.

In the current setting, China had been distributing Real throughout the US for years. Real is a powerful hallucinogenic drug that came in the form of a small, colorful square of cardboard-like material. Contact with the skin produced hallucinations that were claimed to be "realer than real life". The drugs use had been undermining productivity since many citizens would rather "get Real" than work or do anything else. The United States government brought the issue to a head at a peace conference held in Los Angeles. Secretary of State Jackson, Secretary of Defense Berkowitz and Secretary of the DEA Kojima meet with Third Minister Hu Zhiaoxing and issued an ultimatum of war if distribution did not end. Hu Zhiaoxing refused and insisted that Real was not a drug but a meta-stimulation of specific brain regions and China was merely supplying a product to consumers and if the U.S. offered its citizens better, there would not be any demand for Real. This leads to the United States to declare war on China.

The US began its offensive with air-strikes by F-27 aircraft on the Channel Islands, particularly Catalina Island off the coast from Los Angeles. The F-27 was the latest United States Air Force air superiority fighter aircraft. It first entered service in the 2050s but constant upgrades in weaponry, avionics and stealthiness kept it state of the art. With afterburner and strap-on rocket packs, an F-27 could climb to the edge of space. However, the Chinese demonstrated the defensive capabilities of meta-reality technology by defeating the attack. Avatars appeared in the cockpits of the aircraft and forced Real onto the pilots. This established control over their senses and deceived the pilots into crashing their aircraft.

The US resorted to sending the Navy to attack the islands. Warships, using elaborate spoofing, approached the Chinese holding in order to shell them. However, the Chinese again used meta reality technology, this time more directly. For instance, the USS Rumsfeld (named after Donald Rumsfeld) ran into a giant brick wall at flank speed, causing enough damage to sink it.

Hu Zhiaoxing met with his US counterparts via video conference and indicated that the US attacks were ineffective. He offered relatively soft terms for peace, which included that the US allow Chinese distribution of Real without legal penalty, Chinese citizens arrested in the United States be tried in Chinese courts to ensure fairness, and that the US pay a moderate indemnity. American officials rejected the terms and the war continued.

The Chinese launched a punitive raid on Los Angeles. First all power and telephone services (both cell and landlines) were cut off. Then avatars appeared throughout the city warning the residents to evacuate the city. Two and a half hours later, what appeared to be a giant Pyrex bowl covered the city. However, it is impervious to missile and artillery fire. Then, what appeared to be lightning began causing random damage within the bowl.

Meanwhile, companies of conventionally armed Chinese soldiers entered the city. They left the LA citizens alone unless they offered resistance, though a surprisingly large number were armed and not surprisingly angry. In addition, American soldiers trapped within the bowl were allowed to surrender unless they too offered more than token resistance.

After this show of force and the continued impotence of US forces, the US had no option but to surrender. As Hu Zhiaoxing had warned, the terms were harsher, which included the US would place no further restriction on the distribution of the entertainment known as Real and any criminal or civil penalties would be declared null and void, China would receive a 99-year lease on the ports of San Pedro and Long Beach for one dollar a year and that those ports would have no duty on imports although the Chinese reserved the right to impose duties on U.S. products entering the territory and that the US would pay an indemnity of twenty trillion dollars in either gold, petroleum, uranium or hard currency to be agreed upon with the full amount was to be paid within ten years.

Those actions insured that the U.S. would continue its decline.

== See also ==
- The Opium Wars
