= Thirsty God =

1953 short story by Margaret St. Clair

"Thirsty God" is a science fiction story by American writer Margaret St. Clair, first published in The Magazine of Fantasy and Science Fiction for March 1953 and collected in St. Clair's Change the Sky and Other Stories (1974).

The story takes place on Venus, in a version of the Solar System in which Venus and Mars are both inhabitable. Venus has a long rainy season and is home to several humanoid species, while Mars is a desert planet that was home to a now long-vanished advanced civilization, .

== Plot summary ==
During the rainy season on Venus, Brian, an amoral human visitor, flees for his life from the family of a purple-skinned Hrothy girl whom he has raped. Taking refuge in what appears to be a shrine, he is relieved when his pursuers do not follow, and he prepares to wait out their siege.

In fact the shrine is actually an automated biological factory built by ancient Martians, designed to adapt their bodies to the much wetter conditions on Venus. While Brian sleeps the factory sets to work converting his body, but since Brian is not a Martian the process malfunctions.

Next morning Brian wakes to see the Hrothy gone, and assumes that they have either departed to fetch reinforcements or are lying in ambush. When he tries to get up, however, he is horrified to learn that he cannot move a muscle, and is tormented by a terrible thirst.

Soon afterward the shrine is visited by a plunp - an ugly-looking, primitive, amphibian humanoid - whose body is waterlogged from the rain. The plunp begins to dance before Brian, whose converted body is forced to absorb the plunp's moisture. This is intoxicating to the plunp, which seems to regard Brian as a beneficent god, but painful and humiliating for Brian. Even though his body is thirsty for the plunp's moisture, he feels (correctly) as if he is being poisoned by it. When after several hours the plunp leaves he feels bloated by all the water he has absorbed and his body is completely stiff and immobile. Although relieved that his torment has ended, he knows that many more plunp will follow and he can do nothing to prevent it.

When, two days later, more plunp do arrive, Brian manages by a supreme effort to prevent himself from absorbing their water. Unfortunately for him, many others have suffered the same fate before him, and from long experience the plunp know how to overcome his resistance. They force him to absorb their moisture even more rapidly, which is exhilarating for them but traumatic for him.

For the rest of the rainy season Brian passively and helplessly absorbs the plunp's moisture while his thoughts turn inward and violently self-destructive. Meanwhile, his sight and hearing slowly deteriorate and his body becomes permanently bloated.

As the rainy season comes to an end Brian is relieved when the plunp finally stop visiting him. His body becomes dry and dusty and begins to shrink, and he begins to experience blackouts which he dares to hope are a prelude to death and a final release from his suffering.

Brian is not dying but merely entering a state of estivation, from which he will eventually awaken to the first of many more years of service to the plunp.
