= Colliding Branes =

- Short story by Rudy Rucker and Bruce Sterling
- Country: United States
- Language: English
- Genre: Science fiction short story

Publication
- Published in: Asimov's Science Fiction
- Publication type: Periodical
- Publisher: Dell Magazines
- Media type: Print (Magazine)
- Publication date: February 2009

"Colliding Branes" is a science fiction short story by Rudy Rucker and Bruce Sterling. It was first published in the February 2009 issue of Asimov's Science Fiction.

== Synopsis ==
The story follows two bloggers, Angelo Rasmussen and Rabbiteen Chandra, on the last night before the end of the Ekpyrotic universe and the beginning of a new one.

== Reception ==
The Internet Review of Science Fiction's Lois Tilton reviewed '"Colliding Branes" as "fun stuff." Tangent Online's Bob Blough reviewed it as "more fun than past collaborations."

"Colliding Branes" placed at fourteenth place in the Locus Award for Best Short Story.
