= King Solomon's Ring (short story) =

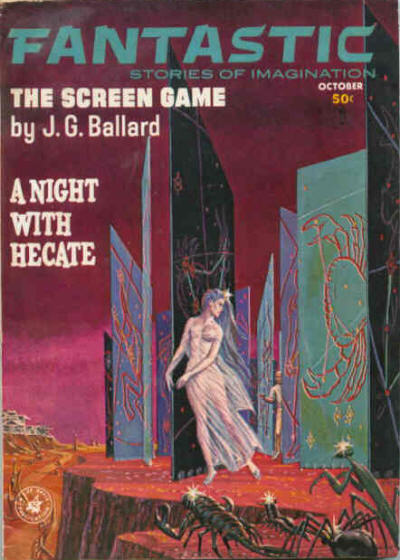
"King Solomon's Ring" was originally published in the October 1963 issue of Fantastic

"King Solomon's Ring" is a science fiction novelette by American writer Roger Zelazny which appeared in the magazine Fantastic: Stories of Imagination in 1963.

The novelette was republished five years later in Great Science Fiction, a reprint companion to Fantastic. Terry Carr included it in his Ace anthology On Our Way to the Future in 1970. After TSR purchased Amazing and Fantastic, it was reprinted in their anthology Fantastic Stories: Tales of the Weird & Wondrous in 1987. Ellen Datlow chose the story for the March 3, 2004 issue of the online Sci Fiction.

"King Solomon's Ring" was not included in any of Zelazny's story collections during his lifetime, but was published in Threshold, the first volume of The Collected Stories of Roger Zelazny, published by NESFA Press in 2009.

While some readers have dismissed the story as lesser work, Samuel R. Delany included it in his listing of Zelazny's characteristic works, an "oeuvre [which] tends to mesh into one gorgeous fabric".
