= Novelty Act =

Short story by Philip K. Dick

"Novelty Act" is a novelette by Philip K. Dick. It involves a dystopian future in which the characters' lives are based on entertaining the First Lady of the United States with "novelty acts." Many of the ideas developed in the story were reworked and reused for his later novel The Simulacra. It was first published in Fantastic (February 1964). It was later published in various collections. In its original version, the story had 13,000 words.

== Plot ==
It is All Souls' Night and the community of Abraham Lincoln communal apartment building is preparing to discuss the affairs of the building. They are going to put on talent shows in hopes of attracting the attention of talent scouts from White House. If they are chosen, they will get to perform for the First Lady, Nicole Thibodeaux, who everyone refers to as “Nicole”. The chairman, Donald Klugman, and the “sky pilot” (one of their religious leaders), Patrick Doyle, begin the meeting with a prayer. He includes in his prayer a hope that Nicole's headaches don't bother her much longer. The first act is the Fettersmoller girls dancing to a popular song. There are several of these shows for entertainment, but the meeting is for business purposes as well, and some of the attendants are nervous about it. Mr. Stone is dissatisfied with the system of public education used within the community, and wants to get rid of it in favor of the outside schools.

Ian Duncan is in his room alone. He has missed the meeting, at the risk of a fine, due to anxiety over the examination he had turned in to Stone earlier that day, which covered the politics and history of the United States. In his reflections on the history, he reveals that Nicole, as First Lady, stays in office while the public elects a new President (a new husband) for her every four years. While thinking, the TV turns itself on for Nicole's on-air programming. This brings him to ponder his act, playing classical music with jugs with his brother, Al. They had performed for a talent scout once, but had been denied the chance to perform for Nicole. While he is thinking, Stone arrives with his test results. Ian had attempted to fail purposely to get out of Abraham Lincoln and use his returned deposit to relocate to Mars. But Stone tells him he passed. Ian realizes that Stone falsified the results for his own "humanitarian reasons."

Al Duncan works at Jalopy Jungle No. 3 selling interplanetary ships of arguable legality. He does this with the aid of a mechanical papoola, a replica of an extinct Martian species, which he controls via a combination of telepathic and radio controls. The papoola is able to make its sales pitch directly to the mind of customers with the same telepathic ability. Ian visits while Al is in the middle of one such sale, ruining the pitch. Ian wants to start making music again. After some discussion, Al finally agrees.

Don Klugman looks over Ian Duncan's application to perform in the next talent show; all is normal except his request to have his brother appear in the show. Because Al is not a member of the commune, Klugman hesitates, but Doyle convinces him to let them perform.

Al wants to use the papoola to win over the talent scout with its telepathic sales pitch. He argues that it would be no worse than the propaganda on television. Ian is hesitant, but Al uses the papoola on him. Though he is able to fight off the majority of the influence, the doubt of his own plan remains. He gives in and they use it because of how important it is to him to perform for Nicole. The plan works. After the performance, news comes that the Duncan Brothers have been chosen to go to the White House.

Stone suspects foul play. In anger, Stone goes to the sky pilot to confess his sin of passing Ian Duncan. He insists that a new test will need to be administered. He is moved to do this because of his concerns that the Duncan Brothers cheated to get a White House performance and he feels resentment over their success. Doyle believes it to be a false confession, forcing him to confess his resentment.

The Duncan Brothers are preparing for their performance. Al is going to play "first jug," the harder part, which is a relief for Ian. Loony Luke, Al Duncan's boss, shows up and confiscates the papoola, telling them not to waste their time at the White House without it. He tells them that he once performed his puppet show for Nicole and she didn't like it, which he has long resented. He tells them that Nicole has been in office seventy-three years and implies that she fakes her appearance on TV. They discuss for some time and the Duncans convince him to come with them and operate the papoola for them.

They arrive at the White House, and an organizer asks them to add a folk tune into their program despite being classical juggists rather than folk, which the Duncan Brothers agree to do. He asks about the papoola. They tell him it is a good luck totem and part of the show, dancing to the music. When they see Nicole, Ian sees that Luke was lying about her faking her appearance as she looks no older than 20. She is hidden behind a security barrier. When she sees the Papoola, she insists that it be allowed to come to her. They raise the barrier and she holds it. They discuss that it is a replica, not a real one, demonstrating the controls. They play their first song and Nicole remarks that the papoola didn't dance. She begs it to dance and it pounces at her, ultimately biting her. Al knows immediately that it was being controlled by Luke, who wanted revenge on Nicole. He tells her this and orders are sent out for Luke's arrest. Nicole confesses that she is an actress, the latest of several who have played the role of the First Lady over the last seventy years, implying that real rulers are somewhere else. The brothers will have their memory erased instead of being arrested so that they will lose their memories of the big success of reaching the White House (and those of each other). The brothers say goodbye.

Ian Duncan wakes up at the Abraham Lincoln apartments. Disoriented because of his memory wipe, he worries he has missed another All Souls' meeting, so he rushes to the meeting place. He is told that All Souls' was the night before and that there will be a pop quiz for him the next day because a rumor that his last test had been tampered with. The man who tells him gives him a hint on the area he needs to study. He returns to his room and watches Nicole on television, he wonders what it would be like to play at the White House. "If I had had a musical family. If I had had a father or brothers to teach me to play..." A bump comes from the window while he's studying for his test. An old man is outside in a flying vehicle. He tell him he is Loony Luke and is going to Mars. He wants take Ian and his brother Al with him, though neither remembers the other, insisting they will when they see each other. He agrees and gets into the jalopy.

== Characters ==
- Ian Duncan - Protagonist, member of a local community. Only goal in the world is to perform for the First Lady
- Al Duncan - Ian's brother, Jalopy salesman. Disenchanted with the ways of the world, but loves his brother
- Patrick Doyle - "Sky Pilot" for community of which Ian is a part.
- Edgar Stone - member of the community, unhappy with certain aspects of the world, but ultimately a humanitarian
- Donald Klugman - chairman of the community
- Nicole Thibodeaux - The First Lady
- Taufic Negal - President
- Loony Luke - Owner of Jalopy Jungles

== Reception ==
Matthew Pagan wrote that "the short story retains the funniest part of The Simulacra, which is the jug musician subplot".
