= The Last Command (short story) =

Short story by Arthur C. Clarke

"The Last Command" is a science fiction short story by English writer Arthur C. Clarke, first published in 1965. It describes events on a distant space station after a devastating nuclear war.

== Plot summary ==
The story consists of a taped message from the leader of the country that launched a space station into a highly elliptical orbit around Earth. The station is equipped with ICBMs capable of reaching targets anywhere on Earth, to deter war through mutually assured destruction. As the story progresses, we hear the leader's instructions, interspersed with the reactions of the crew of the space station, who are identified only by their titles (e.g., "the First Radar Officer"). The reader learns that the message is one of many taped messages for various situations, that nuclear war has occurred on Earth, and that the country that controls this space station has been defeated and almost totally destroyed. The crew are prepared to destroy the enemy country, but their leader orders them not to do so, saying that, as half of mankind has been destroyed, to destroy the other half solely for vengeance would be "insanity, unworthy of reasoning men". In the last sentence of the story, we learn that this space station is controlled by the Soviet Union, and that the enemy was the United States.
