= Explorers We =

1959 science fiction short story by Philip K. Dick

"Explorers We" is a science fiction short story by American writer Philip K. Dick. First published in Fantasy and Science Fiction magazine, January 1959. "Explorers We" was reprinted as a limited edition booklet to commemorate Dick's appearance at the Second International Festival of Science Fiction at Metz, France, September 1977. It was written in 1958, one of only two short stories that Dick wrote in the seven years between 1956 and 1962.

== Plot summary ==
In this story, some aliens come to Earth as perfect replicas of a group of astronauts who died during a mission to Mars. The astronauts seem to be utterly convinced they are humans and they do not understand why the FBI chases them after they have 'come back' to Earth. Humans only know that these astronauts are not the same as those who originally left for Mars, and nothing more. The original astronauts could have been saved and/or cloned by the aliens. The disguise could be a way to try to communicate more easily with the earthlings. Still other factors could explain these perfect copies of human beings, but the earthlings have no intention of investigating them. Above all, the possible threat must be eliminated, and only then questions can be asked. At the end of the story, Wilks, an FBI agent, poses the central question raised by the story:

If it was up to me, Wilks asked himself, what would I do? Try to find out what they want? Anything that looks so human, behaves in such a human way, must feel human... and if they - whatever they are - feel human, might they not become human, in time?

After this brief meditation Wilks goes on to kill the last of the six astronauts, but he soon realizes that he did it only because he was afraid of an alien invasion: "That's what we are told... they are plotting against us, are inhuman, and will never be more than that". He also realizes that the cycle will only continue. At the end of Explorers We the beginning is repeated. Another spaceship with the same six astronauts aboard lands on Earth.

== Influence ==
The 1998 album Explorers_We by electronic art collective Farmers Manual is named in reference to the story.
