= The Unreconstructed M =

Novelette by Philip K. Dick

"The Unreconstructed M" is a science fiction novelette by Philip K. Dick, first published in the January 1957 issue of Science Fiction Stories and later in The Minority Report. The story is in the public domain.

In it, an independent researcher, Leroy Beam, uncovers a plot to falsify evidence in a world where the technology used to solve crimes has advanced. The name of the main character in "The Unreconstructed M" would reappear in Dick's novel 1964 The Penultimate Truth.
