= What'll We Do with Ragland Park? =

1963 science fiction short story by Philip K. Dick

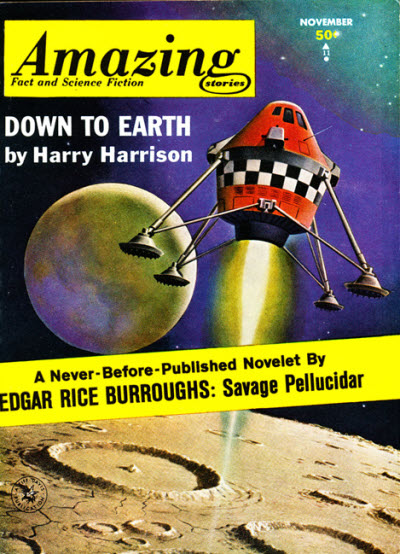
"What'll We Do with Ragland Park?" was originally published in the November 1963 issue of Amazing Stories.

What’ll We Do with Ragland Park? is a science fiction short story by Philip K. Dick, first published in Amazing Stories in 1963. The story is set in a near-future world where political power and public opinion are manipulated through the use of advanced technology.

== Plot ==
The narrative centers on Chick Strikerock, a publicity agent for a prominent political figure named Al Miller, who is running for a major office. Central to Miller’s campaign is the use of “talent” performers—artists, musicians, and poets whose work can shape reality in subtle ways. One such performer is Ragland Park, a folk singer and songwriter whose music possesses the unusual ability to alter the course of events in the real world. Strikerock becomes increasingly concerned about Ragland Park’s influence. Park’s songs, which are often critical and satirical, start to have direct effects on the political landscape and on Miller’s campaign. For example, when Park performs a song that mocks Miller, Miller’s political fortunes decline accordingly. Realizing the threat, Strikerock and his associates attempt to neutralize Park’s influence, fearing that his ability could destabilize not just the campaign but the entire political system. However, attempts to control or silence Park prove ineffective, as his talent seems to grow even stronger in response to opposition.
