= Ted Reynolds (writer) =

American science fiction writer (born 1938)

Theodore Andrus Reynolds (born October 8, 1938) is an American science fiction writer.

Two of his works were nominated for Hugo Awards in 1980: "Can These Bones Live?" for Best Short Story, and Ker-Plop for Best Novella. His only novel, The Tides of God (1989), concerns millennialism being inspired by extraterrestrials.

He was one of the winners of The Village Voice's "Sci-Fi Scenes" writing contest, held in 1980–81; the newspaper published his untitled story of (as the contest rules demanded) exactly 250 words.

He largely stopped writing in 1996 but, after retirement, resumed in 2010.

== Bibliography ==
=== Short fiction ===
Stories

Title	Year	First published	Reprinted/collected	Notes
Can these bones live?	1979	Reynolds, Ted (March 1979). "Can these bones live?". Analog Science Fiction/Science Fact.		
The Kroc War	2015	Reynolds, Ted & William F. Wu (June 2015). "The Kroc War". Analog Science Fiction and Fact. 135 (6): 43–47.		
View through the window	2012	Reynolds, Ted (Aug 2012). "View through the window". Asimov's Science Fiction. 36 (8): 62–67.		
