= Captive Market (short story) =

1955 short story by Philip K. Dick

"Captive Market" is a science fiction short story by American writer Philip K. Dick, first published in the April 1955 issue of If and later in The Minority Report. In it, an old woman uses her ability to travel through time to exploit a special market - a group of survivors in a post-apocalyptic world, struggling to repair a rocket to take them to Venus.
