= The Windows of Heaven (short story) =

"The Windows of Heaven (Two by Two)" is a short story by John Brunner written in 1956. It was first published in the May 1956 issue of New Worlds and collected in the short story collection No Future In It by John Brunner. It also appears in the anthologies Yet More Penguin Science Fiction and The Penguin Science Fiction Omnibus by Brian Aldiss.
