= Orpheus with Clay Feet =

1964 short story by Philip K. Dick

"Orpheus with Clay Feet" is a science fiction short story by American writer Philip K. Dick, originally published in 1964 in Escapade magazine. The story has a self-referential time travel theme, and was published under the pen name "Jack Dowland".

== Plot summary ==
The main character is Jesse Slade, a bored man living in 2040 who visits a time travel tourism agency for a vacation. The agency offers him a trip to the past where he can act as the muse for a famous artist of his choice. Since Beethoven is already taken, Slade chooses to inspire his favorite science fiction author of the 1960s, Jack Dowland, who is said to have revolutionized the genre.

Slade travels to Purpleblossom, Nevada, in 1956, where he is to inspire the writing of Dowland's masterpiece. However, in the process of trying to inspire Dowland, Slade instead causes him to be horrified about the future. Dowland then chooses never to write sci-fi at all and dies young and unknown — except for one story in which a deranged idiot from the future tries to inspire him.

== Self-reference ==
The story makes several references to itself and its author. Dowland's masterpiece, The Father on the Wall, has a title similar to Dick's masterpiece, The Man in the High Castle. Jack Dowland, the fictional author featured in the story, was the pen name used by Dick when the story itself was published. In the story, Dowland takes Slade's tale about time travelling muses and publishes it as a science fiction short story called Orpheus with Clay Feet under the pen name "Philip K. Dick". After Slade's return to the future, Slade and the time travel agent read Dowland's published story. The agent (who calls it a "wretched story") decides what to do with Slade after he reads about his own actions in the published story, saying "that's how he resolved it in the end".
