= Waterspider =

1964 short story by Philip K. Dick

"Waterspider" is a science fiction novelette by American writer Philip K. Dick, first published in the January 1964 edition of If magazine.

Dick's story "Waterspider" features Poul Anderson as one of the main characters. The author refers to himself and his stories "The Variable Man" and "The Defenders"; he also mentions several other science fiction writers of the period, including Murray Leinster, A. E. van Vogt, Margaret St. Clair, Jack Vance, and Isaac Asimov.
