= War Game (short story) =

- Short story by Philip K. Dick
- Country: United States
- Language: English
- Genre(s): Science fiction

Publication
- Published in: Galaxy Science Fiction magazine (1959)
- Media type: Print
- Publication date: December 1959

"War Game" is a 1959 short story by American writer Philip K. Dick. It was first published in the magazine Galaxy Science Fiction, in December 1959, and has since been re-published in two anthologies and at least twenty-four collections.

== Plot summary ==
The Ganymedans are considering war with Earth. A group of Earth toy safety inspectors examine three new toys from Ganymede to discover if they should be allowed to be imported: A toy soldier game where 12 soldiers attack a citadel, a virtual reality suit, and Syndrome, a Monopoly-like board game.

The inspectors determine that the citadel is absorbing the soldiers one by one for an unknown purpose, and fear that the game may secretly be an atomic bomb building to critical mass. The suit is so realistic that an inspector finds returning to reality difficult; with enough time a child would find doing so impossible. They play the board game while waiting with a bomb disposal expert for the last soldier to disappear, but find that the citadel is actually a therapeutic tool to build confidence in children. They nonetheless decide, out of caution, to only allow the board game for import.

A children's store employee brings home a copy of Syndrome to his family. He accumulates the most holdings but learns from his children that he has lost; the purpose, according to the instructions, is to give up as much stock and money as possible. The story concludes with the children, who are unfamiliar with Monopoly, "learning the naturalness of surrendering their holdings"; one says "It's the best educational toy you ever brought home, Dad!"
