= Service Call =

1955 short story by Philip K. Dick

"Service Call" is a science fiction short story by American writer Philip K. Dick. It was first published in Science Fiction Stories, July 1955.

== Plot ==
The plot centers on a man, Courtland, who one evening at his home is visited by a nervous and peculiar repairman. The repairman states he is answering a service call made from Courtland's address and wishes to repair some sort of appliance called a "swibble". Courtland is irritated by the disturbance. Having not made any appointment, nor having the slightest clue about swibbles, Courtland angrily sends the man away. Shortly later, Courtland gets curious about the man. He goes back to his door to see if he is still there. There is no sign of the man save for the crumpled service order on the ground. Courtland examines the paper to discover that the company the man works for will be founded 9 years in the future. Courtland phones his colleagues with an idea. The service man returns, confused and sure he has the correct address. Courtland and his colleagues discover the man works for an authoritarian bio-technology company from an alternate future.
