= Recall Mechanism =

1959 short story by Philip K. Dick

"Recall Mechanism" is a science fiction short story by American author Philip K. Dick, first published in 1959 and later in The Collected Stories of Philip K. Dick, Vol. IV, The Days of Perky Pat (1987).

== Synopsis ==
The story is written in a post-apocalyptic world and begins with a psychologist, who is known as an "Analyst" in the story, called Humphreys. He is analysing one of his patients, Paul Sharp, who has a phobia of falling and suffers bouts of this fear brought on by simply standing on a small step.

Humphreys decides to delve into Sharp's sub-conscious through a hypnotic method of placing a lamp over him. Sharp, on more than one occasion, falls into a dream-like scenario, revealing what he believes has happened to him in the past, thus enabling Humphreys to understand the origin of his fear. Sharp goes on to mention someone called Giller, whom he believes he knew in the past.

At the end, Humphreys prescribes Sharp with medication and lets him go home, but then he makes a phone call to the Special Talents Agency, in which he asks for someone from the Medical Staff. Humphreys reveals to them that his patient may be a "Precog", but after telling them that Sharp was born before the war, the Special Talents Agency disregards Sharp as useless because he "didn't really get enough of a dose."

As Humphreys pleads with them to help, he reveals that Sharp will be dead within months. And so the sub-conscious thoughts were really visions of the future, brought on in the form of fear. The "Precog" being a precognition, or premonition, as these people have become a valuable psychic from the aftermath of a nuclear war.

The story ends in another Analyst's office, Dr. Bamberg, in which the aforementioned Giller is seeking the help. Giller tells Bamberg that he is attracted to high places, but has the terrible compulsion to push people off.
