= If There Were No Benny Cemoli =

- Short story by Philip K. Dick
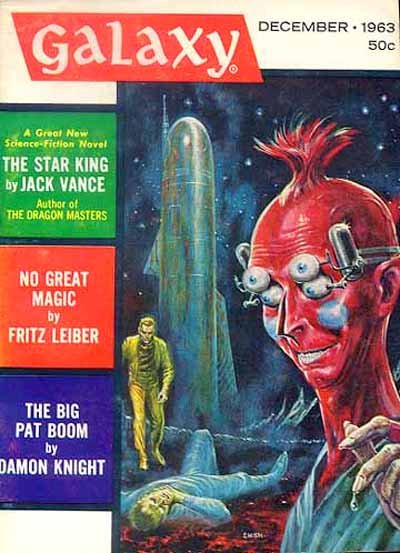
- December 1963 issue of Galaxy Science Fiction
- Country: United States
- Language: English
- Genre: Science-fiction

Publication
- Published in: Galaxy Science Fiction
- Publication type: Magazine
- Publication date: 1963

"If There Were No Benny Cemoli" is a science fiction short story by American writer Philip K. Dick, first published in the December, 1963 issue of Galaxy magazine with illustration by Lutjens.

== Plot summary ==
On the tenth anniversary of a devastating atomic war on Earth, more Proxima Centaurians arrive to continue the rebuilding of the planet. A war crimes tribunal is looking for names of war criminals and a surviving homeopape of The New York Times seems to provide an answer.

== Themes ==
Science fiction historian Darko Suvin wrote that "If There Were No Benny Cemoli" has the theme of the "transformation or transubstantiation of classical European fascism into new American power".

== Reception ==
Algis Budrys said that Dick's story "is, as usual, markedly individual, and distinguished for his ability to draw fine-line social caricatures paradoxically freighted with verisimilitude".
