= Dying Earth (genre) =

Subgenre of science fiction, sometimes with elements of science fantasy

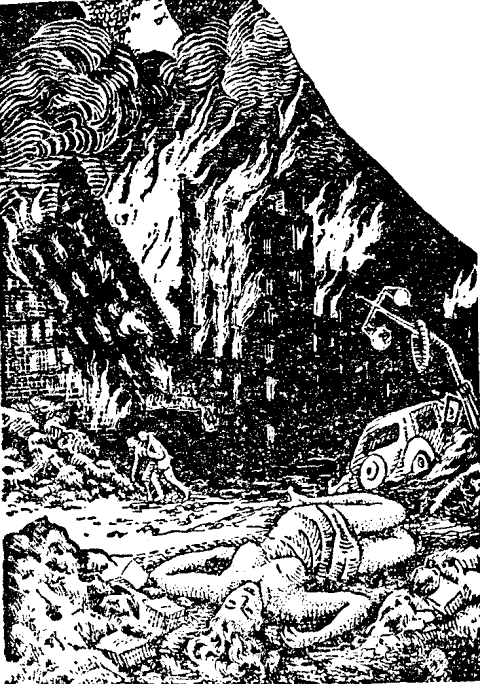
Inner artwork depicting cities in flaming ruins, by an uncredited artist, for the short story "Regeneration" by Charles Dye and Katherine MacLean from Future Combined with Science Fiction Stories, September 1951.

Dying Earth is a subgenre of science fantasy or science fiction which takes place in the far future at either the end of life on Earth or the end of time, when the laws of the universe themselves fail. Dominant themes include world-weariness, innocence, idealism, entropy, heat death of the universe, exhaustion or depletion of many or all resources, and the hope of renewal. A related subgenre set in the distant future of entropic decay is called entropic romance.

== Genre ==
The Dying Earth genre differs from the apocalyptic subgenre in that it deals not with catastrophic destruction, but with entropic exhaustion of Earth. It is therefore described as more "melancholic". The genre was prefigured by the works of the Romantic movement. Jean-Baptiste Cousin de Grainville's Le Dernier Homme (1805) narrates the tale of Omegarus, the Last Man on Earth. It is a bleak vision of the future when Earth has become totally sterile. Lord Byron's poem "Darkness" (1816) shows Earth after the Sun has died. Mary Shelley's The Last Man (1826) details a future in which humanity is slowly but inexorably wiped from the face of the planet by an unstoppable outbreak of the Great Plague, killing almost everyone but the protagonist, immune to the disease's effects.

Another early example is La Fin du Monde (The End of the World, aka Omega: the last days of the world), written by Camille Flammarion and published in France in 1893. The first half of the novel deals with a comet on a collision course with Earth in the 25th century. The last half focuses on Earth's future history, where civilizations rise and fall, humans evolve, and finally Earth ends as an old, dying, and barren planet.

H. G. Wells's 1895 novella The Time Machine utilizes Dying Earth imagery. At the end of the novel, the unnamed time traveller travels thirty million years into the far future, where only gigantic crabs, butterflies and lichens exist on a barren Earth, then travels even further into the future to see the Sun go out and Earth freezing over.

Two brooding works by William Hope Hodgson would elaborate on Wells's vision. The House on the Borderland (1908) takes place in a house besieged by unearthly forces. The narrator then travels into a distant future in which humanity has died and then even further, past the death of Earth. Hodgson's The Night Land (1912) describes a time, millions of years in the future, when the Sun has gone dark. The last few millions of the human race are gathered together in a gigantic metal pyramid, the Last Redoubt, under siege from unknown forces and Powers outside in the dark.

Cover of the first edition of Jack Vance's The Dying Earth

A work by the early French science fiction author J.-H. Rosny aîné, La Mort de la Terre (1910), deals with the last, scattered generation of an evolved humankind on an exhausted, desert Earth and their encounter with a new type of mineral-metallic life. In some ways it reads like the inversion of his earlier Les Xipéhuz (1887), in which early humans encounter and battle an utterly alien and incomprehensible form of life.

From the 1930s onwards, Clark Ashton Smith wrote a series of stories situated in Zothique, the last continent of Earth, where its inhabitants live out their lives in a similar manner to the civilisations of the Classical era. Smith said in a letter to L. Sprague de Camp, dated November 3, 1953:

Zothique, vaguely suggested by Theosophic theories about past and future continents, is the last inhabited continent of earth. The continents of our present cycle have sunken, perhaps several times. Some have remained submerged; others have re-risen, partially, and re-arranged themselves. The science and machinery of our present civilization have long been forgotten, together with our present religions. But many gods are worshipped; and sorcery and demonism prevail again as in ancient days. Oars and sails alone are used by mariners. There are no fire-arms—only the bows, arrows, swords, javelins, etc. of antiquity.

Under the influence of Smith, Jack Vance wrote the short story collection The Dying Earth. The collection had several sequels and gave the subgenre its name.

== Examples ==
- H. P. Lovecraft and Robert H. Barlow – "Till A' the Seas" (1935) is a tale of the slow fading of human civilization and the extinction of all life on Earth as it draws closer to the Sun and its radiance on the surface becomes more intense. The story centers on a male protagonist named Ull, the last of his tribe, and his journey across lands and abandoned cities in hopes of finding water, shelter and other survivors.
- Don A. Stuart – Night (1935). Short story. As an unexpected side effect from an experimental anti-gravity device, a test pilot is sent countless billions of years into the future. The Milky Way has been reduced to less than a light-year in diameter, and the dead Earth is tidally locked to a much larger and colder red Sun. All the gas in the atmosphere, except for neon and helium, is frozen solid. A huge city contains the frozen remains of humans, and the machines humanity had perfected are dead due to the superconductivity caused by the cold.
- Edmond Hamilton – City at World's End (1951) and the comic book story "Superman Under the Red Sun" from Action Comics #300 (1963).
- Arthur C. Clarke – The City and the Stars (1956), a revision and expansion of the earlier novella "Against the Fall of Night".
- John Brunner – Catch a Falling Star, an extended version of The 100th Millennium, first published as "Earth is But a Star" (1958) which features in the Broderick anthology, (2001, below). An early example of a far future tale influenced by Vance.
- Brian Aldiss – Hothouse (1962, also known as The Long Afternoon of Earth). The Earth has locked rotation with the Sun that has increased output, and plants are engaged in a constant frenzy of growth and decay, like a tropical forest enhanced a thousandfold; a few small groups of humans still live, on the edge of extinction, beneath the giant banyan tree that covers the entire day side of Earth.
- Poul Anderson – Epilogue (1962). A novella about a starship from Earth on its way to a new planetary system, but which due to malfunction returns to its origin planetary system again three billion years into the future. Earth has drawn closer to the Sun which itself has grown "a little bigger and hotter", and life on Earth has been replaced by cybernetic organisms, descendants of human technology.
- Mark S. Geston – Lords of the Starship (1967). In the far future, on an Earth devastated by millennia of war, the Caroline Republic is hostile towards its neighbors despite sharing their dire economic straits. Outside the declining remains of civilization lie ruins and wastelands populated by mutants and monsters. It is generally felt that humanity lost its vitality long ago.
- Lin Carter – Giant of World's End (1969), and following prequels. Sword and sorcery fantasy novels set on a decadent far-future Earth in which all the world's landmasses have drifted back together to form a last supercontinent called Gondwane.
- M. John Harrison – a series of short stories and novels set in Viriconium from 1971 onwards. Viriconium is the capital city in which much of the action takes place. Viriconium lies on a dying Earth littered with the detritus of the millennia, seemingly now its own hermetic universe where chronology no longer applies.
- Michael Moorcock – The Dancers at the End of Time series (1972–6).
- Hideyuki Kikuchi – Vampire Hunter D series
- C. J. Cherryh – Sunfall (1977–2004), a collection of short stories set in various locations on Earth in the far future. The tone, themes and fantasy conventions employed in this collection differ by story. (These were reprinted in The Collected Short Fiction of C. J. Cherryh.)
- Doris Piserchia – Earthchild (1977), in which the last human being on Earth faces competition from the world-spanning alien creatures that have devastated the planet.
- George R.R. Martin – Dying of the Light (1977), a novel set on Worlorn, a world whose course is taking it into the far reaches of space, where all life on the planet will die.
- Philip Jose Farmer – In Dark Is the Sun (1979), a tribesman from the distant future quests across the landscape of a dying Earth. As with much of "Dying Earth" science fiction, this text ruminates on the nature of ending, and the meaning of time itself.
- Thundarr the Barbarian (1980–1981) Saturday morning animated series, created by Steve Gerber and produced by Ruby-Spears Productions. Set in a future (c. 3994) post-apocalyptic wasteland divided into kingdoms or territories—the majority of which are ruled by (mostly evil) wizards (who combine magical spells with reanimating technologies from the pre-catastrophe world)—and whose ruins typically feature recognizable geographical features from the United States. The hero Thundarr (voiced by Robert Ridgely), a muscular warrior, whose companions include Princess Ariel, a formidable young sorceress, and Ookla the Mok (leonine humanoid) traveled the world on horseback, battling evil wizards.
- Gene Wolfe – The Book of the New Sun (1981–3) chronicles the journey of a disgraced torturer named Severian to the highest position in the land. Severian, who claims to have a perfect memory, tells the story in first person. The Book takes place in the distant future, where the Sun has dimmed considerably. Wolfe stated that Vance's series directly influenced this work. The Book has several associated volumes.
- Darrell Schweitzer – The Shattered Goddess (1983), fantasy novel set at the end of man's dominion over Earth, in the interval between the death of the last deity of the former age and the rise of the first of the new. Followed by Echoes of the Goddess (2013), a prequel short story collection.
- Michael Shea – Nifft the Lean (1982), a series of sword and sorcery tales set in a far future age where demons and alien entities vie for dominion over Earth. A later story set in the same universe involved a mash up with Vance's Cugel the Clever.
- Alan Grant – King Batman (November 1, 1996), story in Batman: Shadow of the Bat Annual #4 in which a supreme evil overlord observes as reality itself is falling apart from his castle citadel situated in front of a dying star. He peers back in time featuring a penultimate battle between good and evil which effected the very nature of the universe itself, horrid outcomes leading to the abysmal state in which he surveys. Using his almighty power the last monarch known as He-Who-Dares uses his abilities to torque the outcome of said fateful conflict between Nu-Gotham and its legacy hero/monarch against the assault of an invading horde in goods favor. Causing reality to shift into a form of higher existential consciousness thus bringing about a new dawn.
- Alan Moore – Wildstorm Spotlight #1 (February 1, 1997), set at the penultimate heat death of the Universe. Majestros of Khera/Earth heads up a small conclave of immortal nomads eons in the future as reality dies around them.
- Damien Broderick, ed. – Earth is But a Star: Excursions through Science Fiction to the Far Future (2001), an anthology of canonical dying Earth short stories mostly set on Earth in the far future, interwoven with specially commissioned critical essays on the dying Earth theme.
- Ian Edginton – The Establishment (November 1, 2002), the end of which being re-visitation of Alan Moore's Wildstorm Spotlight: The Big Chill where Majestros had found a vastly evolved iteration of his former WildC.A.T.s associate Spartan who sought to restart creation itself as it was ending. A deranged scientist from an alternate future would endeavor to co-opt his remaking of the dying continuum for his own purposes, with the British superteam and main leads of the comic itself mobilizing to stop him.
- Greg Bear – City at the End of Time (2008), a novel that is a homage to William Hope Hodgson's The Night Land.
- Jason Aaron – The Last Days of Midgard (2013), a comicbook miniseries for Thor: God of Thunder comics in early 2014, where Allfather Thor sits at the end of time overseeing both the rebuilding of Old Asgard and a dying planet Earth after humanity killed its ecosystem, the race itself dying off as a result.
- Rick Remender – Low (July 30, 2014), a comic series set billions of year in the future where the rapid expansion of the Sun forces humanity to live underwater.
- Joe Keatinge – Strange Visitor (August 27, 2014), at the ultimate heat death of the prime DC Universe. Earth's denizens of the distant future begin evacuating as the world comes to an end while old friends Rathotis and Kamandi regale each other using old tales of Superman and his feats of courage and hope. Eventually the Starchild of El would return far more powerful than ever to rescue an astronaut crew from being stuck in another dimension in the distant past. The now immortalized Superman would use his newfound abilities to halt the coming bite of entropy long enough to save everyone onboard before letting the old universe wink out so he could ferry them into the next.
- Dan Jurgens – Of Tomorrow (April 18, 2018), a short story spinning out of Action Comics 1000. Superman pays final respects to his adopted home planet billions of years in the future where the Sun was in the onset of consuming Earth. He and most of humanity, his wife included, having left for the stars long ago; Kal-El simply leaving a glass mini-figure of his surrogate parents behind at the memorial for Jonathan and Martha Kent before flying off.
- Stant Litore - Ansible: A Thousand Faces (2020), a collection of ten novellas and short stories published 2014–2020, partially in homage to the works of Ursula K. Le Guin and William Hope Hodgson (The Night Land). Telepathic explorers make first contact and unwittingly open up the twenty-fifth century Earth to a soul-devouring alien species. On a darkened Earth, humanity's survivors take refuge within a huge arcology inspired by the Last Redoubt in The Night Land; a band of time travelers move up and down humanity's timeline to preserve the species, ranging from prehistory to the eventual heat death of the universe.

== See also ==
- Apocalyptic and post-apocalyptic fiction
- Far future in fiction
