= Belgian literature =

Because modern Belgium is a multilingual country, (Note: Dutch, French and German are legally the three official languages in Belgium, see: Belgium, European Union) Belgian literature (French: Littérature belge, Dutch: Belgische literatuur, German: Belgische Literatur) is often treated as a branch of French literature or Dutch literature. Some writing also exists in the regional languages of Belgium, with published works in both the Walloon language, closely related to French, and also in various regional Flemish or Dutch-related dialects.

German is the third official language in Belgium and is spoken by a small community of about 70,000 German-speakers of the German-speaking Community of Belgium in the border region Eupen-Malmedy. See de:Belgische_Literatur#Die_deutsche_Literatur_in_Belgien.

== Dutch/Flemish writers ==
- Hendrik Conscience (1812 – 1883), author of The Lion of Flanders (1838)
- Guido Gezelle (1830 – 1899), noted for his use of West Flemish dialect
- Cyriel Buysse (1859 – 1932)
- Willem Elsschot (pseudonym of Alphonsus Josephus de Ridder, 1882 – 1960)
- Marnix Gijsen (pen name of Joannes Alphonsius Albertus Goris, 1899 – 1984)
- Louis Paul Boon (1912 – 1979)
- Hugo Claus (1929 – 2008)
- Jef Geeraerts (1930 – 2015)
- Eric de Kuyper (born 1942)
- Herman de Coninck (1944 – 1997) poet
- Herman Brusselmans (born 1957)
- Tom Lanoye (born 1958)
- Erwin Mortier (born 1965)
- Dimitri Verhulst (born 1972)

=== See also ===
- Flemish Community
- (in Dutch) Lijst van Vlaamse schrijvers (list of Flemish authors)
- "Museum of the Flemish literature" (in Dutch). Het Letterenhuis. Archived from the original on 19 July 2012.

== Belgian literature in French ==
Belgian literature in French.

- Nicolas Ancion
- Alain Le Bussy
- Francis Baudouin
- Charles De Coster
- Eugène Demolder
- André-Paul Duchâteau
- Georges Eekhoud
- Max Elskamp
- Michel de Ghelderode
- Albert Giraud
- Maurice Grevisse
- Camille Lemonnier
- Suzanne Lilar
- Maurice Maeterlinck
- Thierry Martens
- Pierre Mertens
- Henri Michaux
- Amélie Nothomb
- Jean Ray aka John Flanders for his works in Dutch
- Georges Rodenbach
- J.H. Rosny and J.-H. Rosny aîné & J.-H. Rosny jeune
- Stanislas-André Steeman
- Georges Simenon
- Jean-Philippe Toussaint
- Emile Verhaeren
- Henri Vernes
- Arthur Xhignesse
- Marguerite Yourcenar

=== See also ===
- Francophone literature
- Belgian French
- French Community of Belgium
- "Centre d'Histoire de la littérature belge en langue française" (in French). www.ulb.ac.be. Archived from the original on 1 March 2012.

== Belgian literature in Walloon ==
Literature in Walloon has been printed since the 16th century or at least since the beginning of the 17th century. Its golden age was in the 19th century: 'That period saw an efflorescence of Walloon literature, plays and poems primarily, and the founding of many theaters and periodicals.' Yves Quairiaux counted 4800 plays for 1860–1914, published or not. In this period plays were almost the only popular show in Wallonia. But this theater remains popular in present-day Wallonia: Theatre is still flourishing with over 200 non-professional companies playing in the cities and villages of Wallonia for an audience of over 200,000 each year. Jacques Ancion wanted to develop a regular adult audience. This regional literature most commonly deals with local folklore and ancient traditions, the most prominent Walloon author being Arthur Masson.

- Simon de Harlez (~1700-1782): "Les Ypoconte" (1758)
- Charles-Nicolas Simonon (1774-1847): "Li Côparèye" (1822)
- Nicolas Defrecheux (1825-1874): "Lèyîz-m'plorer" (Let me weep, 1854)
- Édouard Remouchamps (1836-1900) wrote the vaudeville theater piece "Tåtî l'pèriquî" (Gautier, the barber, 1885)
- Dieudonné Salme: the novel "Li Houlot" (The cadet, 1888)
- Willame Georges (1863-1917), sonnets
- François Renkin (1872-1906), stylized prose
- Henri Simon (1856-1939): "Li Mwért di l'åbe" (The death of the tree, 1909) and "Li pan dè bon Diu" (The Bread of the Good Lord, 1914)
- Martin Lejeune (1859-1902): poetry
- Jules Claskin (1884-1926), poetry
- Gabrielle Bernard (1893-1963): poetry
- Edmond Wartique (1893-1953): "Les crwès dins les bruwères" (1932)
- Joseph Mignolet (1893-1973): "li tchèsturlinne dèl Bèle Rotche" (1922), "Li tchant di m' tere" (1935)
- Auguste Laloux (1908-1976): "Li p'tit Bêrt", written before 1940, published in 1963
- Franz Dewandelaer (1909-1952): "El moncha qui crech" (1948)
- Willy Bal (1916-2013) : "Au soya des leus" (1947)
- Émile Gilliard (1928-2023): "A chîjes trawéyes" (1996), "Lès djoûs racoûtichenut" (2014)
- Lucien Somme (1932-2012): "Li dêrin dès catîs" (2003)

== See also ==
- Belgian comics
- French literature
- Dutch literature

== Notes and references ==
- Notes:
