= Encounter in the Dawn =

Short story by Arthur C. Clarke

- Short story by Arthur C. Clarke
- Illustration in Amazing Stories
- Country: United Kingdom
- Language: English
- Genre: Science fiction

Publication
- Published in: Amazing Stories
- Publication date: June–July 1953

"Encounter in the Dawn" is a science fiction short story by British author Arthur C. Clarke, first published in 1953 in the magazine Amazing Stories. It is part of the short story collection Expedition to Earth. Its plot and ideas influenced the development of the 1968 film 2001: A Space Odyssey and its corresponding novel.

== Title ==
The story has appeared under several titles. In his 1972 book The Lost Worlds of 2001, Clarke noted that:

An editor at Ballantine Books gave it the ingenious title "Expedition to Earth" when it was published in the book of that name, but I prefer "Encounter in the Dawn". However, when Harcourt, Brace and World brought out my own selection of favourites, The Nine Billion Names of God, it was mysteriously changed to "Encounter at Dawn".

== Plot ==
Three scientists, Altman, Bertrond, and Clindar, are crewing a spaceship on a survey of the Milky Way. They come across a planet that is very similar to their own homeworld, and is inhabited by a species of intelligent but primitive humanoids. Life of this type is rare, so the three men make contact with one of the planet's inhabitants, a hunter named Yaan. Yaan does not understand his visitors' language or technology (which includes an advanced robot) and he regards them as gods of some kind.

Bertrond hopes to lift Yaan's people out of their "barbarism", and begins to introduce Yaan to new technology and knowledge. However, the civilisation that the scientists come from is collapsing, for unclear reasons relating to "mistakes" and the death of stars. Altman and Clindar insist that they all abandon the expedition and return to their homeworld. As a result, Yaan's people will be left to develop alone, which could take them millions of years.

Before departure, the melancholy Bertrond speaks to Yaan about the irony and tragedy of their encounter, though Yaan still cannot understand him. Bertrond gives Yaan several gifts, including a sharp blade and a powered torch. Then he boards the spaceship, which takes off and vanishes into the night sky. Yaan realizes that the "gods" are gone forever, and wanders back to his village. The story ends with saying that "more than a thousand centuries ahead, Yaan's descendants would build the great city they were to call Babylon", revealing that Yaan's people are prehistoric humans and their planet, the setting of the story, is Earth.

First appeared in Amazing Stories, June-July, 1953.

== See also ==
- "The Sentinel", another story by Clarke with similar ideas
- "The Red One", a short story by Jack London
- "Les Xipéhuz", a novella by writing duo J.-H. Rosny
