= Charles Derennes =

French novelist, essayist and poet (1882–1930)

- Born: 4 August 1882; Charente, France
- Died: April 27, 1930 (aged 47)
- Burial place: Villeneuve-sur-Lot, France
- Occupations: Novelist; essayist; poet
- Spouse(s): Rosita Finaly (m. 1909; div. 1911) Christiane (m. 1916)
- Writing career
- Notable awards: Prix Femina (1924)

Charles Derennes (French pronunciation: [ʃaʁl dəʁɛn]; 4 August 1882 – 27 April 1930) was a French novelist, essayist and poet, the winner of the Prix Femina in 1924.

== Biography ==
Derennes was born in Charente, the son of Gustave, a professor of history, and Marthe Cassan, the daughter of a baker. Charles spent his childhood in Villeneuve-sur-Lot. In 1892, he entered the lyceum of Talence in the suburbs of Bordeaux. There he met the poet Émile Despax from Dax, and Marcel Gounouilhou, future director of the daily La Petite Gironde with whom he would collaborate.

After graduating from the lyceum in 1899, he seemed destined for a career as a teacher by family tradition, and went to Paris to prepare for the entrance examination for the École Normale Supérieure at the Lycée Henri-IV and the Lycée Louis-le-Grand, from which he was expelled. He attended classes at the Sorbonne, obtained a bachelor's degree in letters in 1903, and frequented literary salons such as that of Anna de Noailles and the poetry evenings of the magazine La Plume at the Caveau du Soleil d'Or.

On 11 May 1909, in Paris, he married Rosita Finaly, one of the daughters of Hugo Finaly, founder of the Banque de Paris et des Pays-Bas, which ended in divorce on 19 January 1911. During the Great War, he was a military nurse in southwestern France. He married a second time in Paris on 23 March 1916, with Christiane. In 1917, Derennes settled temporarily in the Landes. From 1905, he was part of the group of writers, including Rosny jeune, Paul Margueritte, and Maxime Leroy, which, at the beginning of the 20th century, made Hossegor known and where he stayed regularly until the early 1920s.

On 10 December 1924, he obtained the Prix Femina for Émile et les autres, the third volume of the series Bestiaire sentimental. Appointed a knight of the Legion of Honour on 4 January 1925, he died on 27 April 1930, and was buried in Villeneuve-sur-Lot.

== Literary work ==
Derennes began a literary career at a young age, but success came gradually. He published more than fifty books in the twenty-five years of his career, and collaborated at the same time in numerous newspapers and magazines. Critics often praised his work.

He is known for his collections of poems: L'Enivrante Angoisse, La Tempête, La Chanson des Deux Jeunes Filles or Perséphone. He is also the author of a volume of poems, Romivatge, of the Occitan language, a language he had practised since his youth.

After L'Amour fessé and Le Peuple du pôle, he published "Parisian" before the war and novels that were published originally in the weekly magazine La Vie Parisienne: Les Caprices de Nouche, Le Béguin des Muses, Le Miroir des pécheresses, Nique et ses cousines. Subsequently, he published other novels, among which are La Nuit d'été, Cassinou va-t-en guerre, La Petite Faunesse, Le Renard bleu, Mon Gosse..., Ouily et Bibi, Amours basques, Le Pauvre et son chien.

Le Bestiaire sentimental, which was a favourite with the public, comprises three volumes: Vie de Grillon, La Chauve-Souris and Émile et les autres. In these stories, he gave tender attention to animals such as crickets, bats, cats, and frogs.

== Works ==
=== Poems ===
- 1904: L'Énivrante angoisse, Librairie Paul Ollendorff
- 1906: La Tempête, Ollendorff
- 1918: La Chanson des deux Jeunes Filles, À la Belle Édition
- 1920: Perséphone, Garnier
- 1921: Le Livre d'Annie, François Bernouard
- 1923: La Fontaine Jouvence, Garnier
- 1924: La Princesse, "Les Amis d'Edouard"
- 1924: Romivatge, Samatan, Editorial Occitan, "Amics del Libre Occitan", (poems in Occitan language).
- 1925: Premières poésies, Albert Messein, (with L'Énivrante angoisse and La Tempête).

=== Essays and novels ===
- 1906: L'Amour fessé, Mercure de France, novel
- 1907: Le Peuple du Pôle, Mercure de France, novel (translated into English by Brian Stableford as The People of the Pole, Black Coat Press, 2008 ISBN 978-1-934543-39-9 )
- 1907: La Vie et la Mort de M. de Tournèves, Éditions Grasset, novel
- 1908: La Guenille, Louis-Michaud, novel
- 1909: Les Caprices de Nouche, Éditions de la Vie Parisienne, novel
- 1912: Le Béguin des Muses, Éditions de la Vie Parisienne, novel
- 1912: Le Miroir des Pécheresses, Louis-Michaud, novel
- 1913: Les Enfants sages, Louis-Michaud, novel
- 1914: Nique et ses Cousines, Louis-Michaud, novel
- 1914: La Nuit d'été, L'Édition, novel
- 1917: Cassinou va-t-en guerre, L'Édition française illustrée, novel
- 1918: Leur tout petit cœur, La Renaissance du Livre, novel
- 1918: Le Pèlerin de Gascogne, L'Édition française illustrée, tales and narrations
- 1918: La Petite Faunesse, L'Édition, novel
- 1919: Les Conquérants d'idoles, L'Édition française illustrée (illustrations by Charles Genty), then Georges-Crès, novel
- 1919: Les Bains dans le Pactole, Albin Michel, novel
- 1920: L'Aventure de Roland Ombreval, poète – 1830, Société anonyme d'édition et de librairie, novel
- 1920: Vie de Grillon, Albin Michel, essay
- 1921: Le Renard bleu, Albin Michel, novel
- 1921: Le Beau Max, Ferenczi, novel
- 1922: La Chauve-Souris, Albin Michel, essay
- 1923: Le Pou et l'Agneau, Ferenczi, novel
- 1923: Mon Gosse..., Baudinière, novel
- 1924: Bellurot, Éditions du Monde moderne, novel
- 1924: Émile et les autres, Albin Michel, essay
- 1925: L'Enfant dans l'herbe, Ferenczi, novel
- 1925: Ouily et Bibi, Albert Messein, novel
- 1925: Le Mirage sentimental, Éditions de la Nouvelle Revue critique, (with La Vie et la Mort de M. de Tournèves and L'Aventure de Roland Ombreval, poète).
- 1925: Gaby, mon amour, Albin Michel, novel (reprint of La Nuit d'été)
- 1925: Les Petites alliances, Albin Michel, novel
- 1926: La Fortune et le Jeu. Le jeu, les jeux et l'activité humaine, Ed. Georges Anquetil, essay
- 1926: Mouti, chat de Paris, Albin Michel, novel
- 1927: Amours et Crimes, Éditions de France, historical essay
- 1927: Mouti, fils de Mouti, Éditions de la Nouvelle Revue critique, novel
- 1927: Les Cocus célèbres, Éditions de France, historical essay
- 1928: Amours basques, Nouvelle Société d'Édition, novel
- 1928: La Mort du Prince impérial, Hachette, historical essay
- 1928: Les Noces sur la banquise, Éditions de la Nouvelle Revue critique, novel
- 1930: Le Pauvre et son chien, La Renaissance du Livre, novel
- 1930: Dieu, les Bêtes et Nous. Les Porte-Bonheur, Éditions des Portiques, essay

=== Works written in collaboration ===
- 1914: La Grande Anthologie, la seule qui ne publie que de l'inédit, Louis-Michaud, s. d., Collections of literary pastiches written in particular in collaboration with Pierre Benoit and Charles Perrot
- 1921: La Pléiade, Librairie de France, collection of poems by comtesse de Noailles, Pierre Camo, Charles Derennes, Joachim Gasquet, Xavier de Magallon, Fernand Mazade, Paul Valéry
- 1921: Journal des Goncours. Mémoires de la vie littéraire par un groupe d'indiscrets (partie inédite). Année 1896, La Renaissance du Livre, s. d., literary pastiche attributed to Pierre Benoit, to which he collaborated closely with other authors such as Léon Deffoux
- 1924: Un train entre en gare, Éditions du Siècle, novel signed Henri Seguin, a literary mystification to which Pierre Benoit, Tristan Derème and other authors also collaborated
- 1925: Le Jocond, Éditions du Siècle, another novel signed Henri Seguin, mystification by the same
- 1927: La Promenade Euskadienne. Notes et Souvenirs du Pays basque, 1892-1927, in Le Pays basque, by Charles Derennes, François de Vaux de Foletier, Hector Talvart, foreword by Thierry Sandre, La Rochelle, Éditions d'art Raymond Bergevin
- 1927: Le Limousin, le Quercy et le Périgord, in Le Visage de la France [collective], Éditions des Horizons de France, fasc. 14.
- 1928: Le Nouveau Livre de la Pléiade, Librairie de France, F. Sant'Andrea, collection of poems by Joachim Gasquet, Comtesse de Noailles, Pierre Camo, Charles Derennes, Xavier de Magallon, Fernand Mazade, Paul Valéry
- 1928: La dompteuse, in La Femme, selon [collective], Baudinière
- 1930: Gens et Bêtes de Gascogne, in Sud-Ouest. Béarn, Pays basque, Côte d'Argent, Gascogne, by Xavier de Cardaillac, Charles Derennes, François Duhourcau, Pierre Frondaie, Étienne Huyard, Francis Jammes, Hervé Lauwick, Maxime Leroy, François Mauriac, Joseph de Pesquidoux, J. H. Rosny Jeune, drawings by P.-G. Rigaud, Léon Fauret, Suzanne Labatut, Hossegor, Librairie D. Chabas

== Bibliography ==
- Raoul Davray, Henry Rigal, Anthologie des Poètes du Midi, Ollendorff, 1908, p. 69-76.
- Gabriel Boissy, Dominique Folacci, L'amour dans la poésie française. Essai suivi d'un recueil sur les plus beaux poèmes d'amour, Fayard, s. d. [1910], p. 45, p. 275-276.
- Adolphe Van Bever, Les Poètes du Terroir, Delagrave, 1920, t. 2, p. 356-358.
- Henri Martineau, "Charles Derennes, poète", Le Divan, n°67, September–October 1922.
- Pierre Lièvre, "Les Poètes du Divan. Anthologie", Le Divan, n°92, September–October 1923, p. 477-478.
- Robert de La Vaissière, Anthologie poétique du XXe siècle, Crès, t. 1, 1923, p. 116-123.
- Adolphe Van Bever, Paul Léautaud, Poètes d'Aujourd'hui, Mercure de France, 1927, t. 1, p. 107-121.
- Maurice-Pierre Boyé, "Poètes : Charles Derennes", La Muse française, n°3, 15 July 1935, p. 299-312
- Louis Ducla, Trois Grands Poètes d'Aquitaine, Carcassonne, Éditions du Domaine, 1938, p. 15-25
- Jean-Louis Lambert, Charles Derennes (1882-1930). Un écrivain à Hossegor et dans les Landes. L'homme et l'œuvre, Hossegor, Éditions "Lac et lande", 2004.
- Gérard Maignan, Ils ont fait Hossegor, Biarritz, Atlantica, 2006, p. 71-79.
- Charles Picot, "Charles Derennes", Revue de l'Agenais, n°4, October–December 2006, p. 893-906 and n°1, January–March 2007, p. 45-54
