= Danièle Chatelain =

French writer

Danièle Chatelain is a professor of French at the University of Redlands in Redlands, California. She holds master's degrees from the University of Strasbourg and the University of California, Riverside, where she also earned her Ph.D. in 1982. Chatelain specializes in nineteenth-century French literature and the comparative analysis of science fiction, frequently collaborating with her late husband, George Edgar Slusser.

She is the author of Perceiving and Telling: A Study of Iterative Discourse, a structural study of narrative techniques. Her research articles have been published in academic journals such as Science Fiction Studies, Poétique, and Style. As an editor, she has co-edited volumes including H.G. Wells's Perennial Time Machine. Chatelain is also a translator of early French science fiction; her full-length English translations include Honoré de Balzac's The Centenarian (2004) and J.-H. Rosny's Three Science Fiction Novellas: From Prehistory to the End of Mankind (2012), both published by Wesleyan University Press.

She was married to George Edgar Slusser until his death in 2014. She shared with him an interest for the comparative analysis of science fiction, with a focus on the influence of the works of H. G. Wells.

== Books ==
- Transformations of Utopia: Changing Views of the Perfect Society, ed. by George E. Slusser, Paul K. Alkon, Roger Gaillard & Daniele Chatelain. New York City: AMS Press, 1999. Reviewed in Extrapolation Vol. 40 (1999).
- H. G. Wells's Perennial Time Machine: Selected Essays from the Centenary Conference The Time Machine: Past, Present and Future, Imperial College, London, July 26–29, 1995, ed. by George E. Slusser, Patrick Parrinder & Daniele Chatelain. Athens, GA: University of Georgia Press, 2001.
- The Centenarian: Or, the Two Beringhelds, by Honoré de Balzac, translated by George E. Slusser & Daniele Chatelain. (city), (state): Wesleyan University Press, 2004.
- The Centenarian: Or, the Two Beringhelds, by Honoré de Balzac, translated and annotated by George E. Slusser & Daniele Chatelain. Middletown, CT: Wesleyan University Press, 2004.
- Three Science Fiction Novellas: From Prehistory to the End of Mankind, by J.-H. Rosny aîné, translated and annotated by Danièle Chatelain and George Slusser. Middletown, CT: Wesleyan University Press, 2012.

== Short nonfiction ==
- "Spacetime Geometries: Time Travel and the Modern Geometrical Narrative," by George E. Slusser & Daniele Chatelain, in The Buffalo Americanist Digest 3:1 (Fall 1995).
- "Flying to the Moon in French and American Science Fiction," by Daniele Chatelain & George E. Slusser, in Space and Beyond: The Frontier Theme in Science Fiction, ed. by Gary Westfahl. Westport, CT: Greenwood Publishing Group, 2000.
- "Conveying Unknown Worlds: Patterns of Communication in Science Fiction," by George E. Slusser & Daniele Chatelain, in Science-Fiction Studies #87, Vol. 29, Part 2 (July 2002).
