= The Red One =

1918 short story by Jack London

- Short story by Jack London
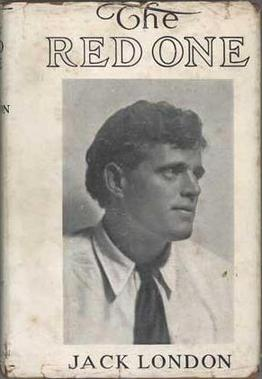
- First collection edition
- Country: United States
- Language: English
- Genre: Science fiction

Publication
- Publication type: Magazine
- Publisher: The Cosmopolitan
- Publication date: 1918

"The Red One" is a short story by Jack London. It was first published in the October 1918 issue of The Cosmopolitan, two years after London's death. The story was reprinted in the same year by MacMillan, in a collection of London's stories of the same name.

== Overview ==
The story is told from the perspective of a scientist called Bassett, who is on an expedition in the jungle of Guadalcanal to collect butterflies. The "Red One" of the title refers to a giant red sphere, of apparently extraterrestrial origin, that the headhunting natives worship as their god and to which they make human sacrifices. Bassett becomes obsessed with the Red One, and in the end is sacrificed himself.

The story's theme was suggested to London by his friend George Sterling, to whom he wrote in 1916:

Do you remember another wonderful story you told me a number of years ago—of the meteoric message from Mars or some other world in space, that fell amongst isolated savages, that was recognized for what it was by the lost explorer, who died or was killed before he could gain access to the treasure in the heart of the apparent meteor?

There are parallels to Joseph Conrad's short novel Heart of Darkness. Critics have noted the possible influence of Carl Jung on the story, as London became aware of Jung's ideas at around the time of writing "The Red One" in 1916.

The story makes an enigmatic reference to helmeted figures, perhaps the Red One's alien crew. Here, London may have anticipated the ancient astronauts of science fiction and pseudoscience. The science fiction writer Arthur C. Clarke mentioned "The Red One" in a note to his 1983 short story collection The Sentinel:

Some time after "The Sentinel" was published, I was asked if I had ever read Jack London’s "The Red One" (1918). As I’d never even heard of it, I hastened to do so, and was deeply impressed by his thirty-year-earlier tale of the "Star-Born," an enormous sphere lying for ages in the jungles of Guadalcanal. I wonder if this is the first treatment of a theme which has suddenly become topical, now that the focus of the SETI debate has changed from “Where’s Everyone?” to the even more puzzling "Where Are Their Artifacts?"

The U.S. copyright on "The Red One" has expired, and the story is available on Project Gutenberg.

== See also ==
- Flatland, a novel by Edwin Abbott Abbott
- Les Xipéhuz, a novel by J.-H. Rosny
