= The Death of the Earth =

1910 novel by J.-H. Rosny aîné

- 1958 edition (publ. Denoel)
- Author: J.-H. Rosny aîné
- Original title: La Mort de la Terre
- Translators: George E. Slusser (1978, 2012), Brian Stableford (2010)
- Language: French
- Genre: Science fiction, Adventure novel
- Publisher: Arno Press (US), Black Coat Press (US), Wesleyan University Press (US)
- Publication date: 1910
- Publication place: Belgium
- English publication date: 1978, 2010, 2012
- Media type: Print (hardback & paperback)
- ISBN: 978-0-405-11020-7 (1978), ISBN 978-1-935558-35-4 (2010) & ISBN 978-0-8195-6945-5 (2012)
- OCLC: 774276672

The Death of the Earth (French: La Mort de la Terre) is a 1910 Belgian science fiction novel by J.-H. Rosny aîné in the "Dying Earth" genre.

== Plot summary ==
In the far future, the Earth has become an immense, dry desert. Small communities of future humans, partially adapted to the harsher climate, survive united by the "Great Planetarium" communications web. The means for human survival are rapidly diminishing beyond repair, with the remaining supplies of water failing or becoming increasingly hard to find. Along with this, a barely comprehensible form of life – "ferromagnetals" ("les ferromagnétaux") – have begun to develop and spread within and throughout the Earth itself.

The narrative focuses mainly on group of humans led by Targ, who at the beginning of the story is the overseer of the Great Planetarium.

== Commentary ==
In the preface, Rosny wrote:

The Death of the Earth is a short novel that I could easily have stretched into three hundred pages. I didn't do it because, in my opinion, scientific fantasy is a genre of literature that demands concision: those who practice it are too often prone to rambling.

The commentary to the 1912 Russian translation says that Rosny's demise of the humankind does not match the actual course of human history. Since the destruction of humanity must occur due to the disappearance of water, it has to be happen in a very distant future. However there is no manifestation of considerable progress beyond improved airplanes, telephones, and earth-digging machines. In the critic's opinion, since the novel is detached from actual science ad reality, it is "weak, pale, and lifeless".

== Translations ==
- Russian: by V. Kerzhentsev (alias of Platon Kerzhentsev) as Гибель Земли (1912, 1990, 2003, 2024)
- English: by George Edgar Slusser as The Death of the Earth in The Xipehuz and The Death of the Earth (1978)

== See also ==
- 1910 in science fiction
