= Les Xipéhuz =

1888 novella by the writing duo J.-H. Rosny

- Short story by J.-H. Rosny aîné
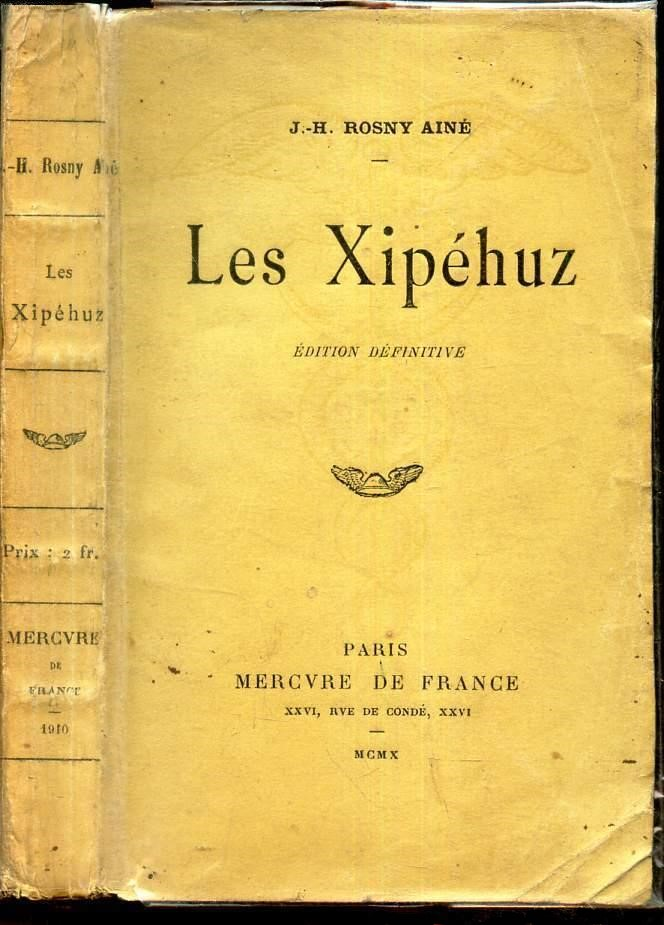
- Cover of the 1910 edition published by Mercure de France
- Language: French
- Genre: Scientific romance

Publication
- Published in: L'Immolation

Les Xipéhuz (1888) is a novella by the writing duo J.-H. Rosny – although it is possible that Rosny aîné was the principal contributor. It describes the fight that threatens humanity, in the beginning of its history, against a non-organic form of intelligent life, the Xipéhuz, some sort of sentient crystals. It is both his first story set in prehistoric times, and his first science fiction story, although the term did not yet exist.

Set during the Neolithic period, the narrative follows the nomadic Zahelal tribe, led by Bakhoûn, as they confront an intelligent, inorganic lifeform known as the Xipéhuz—sentient crystals that challenge human survival.

Written in the late 1880s, the novella emerged during a prolific decade for fantastic literature in the Western world. It provided J.-H. Rosny aîné an opportunity to explore alterity with a unique and empathetic perspective. By framing the conflict between humans and the Xipéhuz through a Darwinian struggle for survival, the author underscores the triumph of rational thought as a catalyst for human dominance over other species.

== Background ==
=== Literary beginnings and departure from naturalism ===
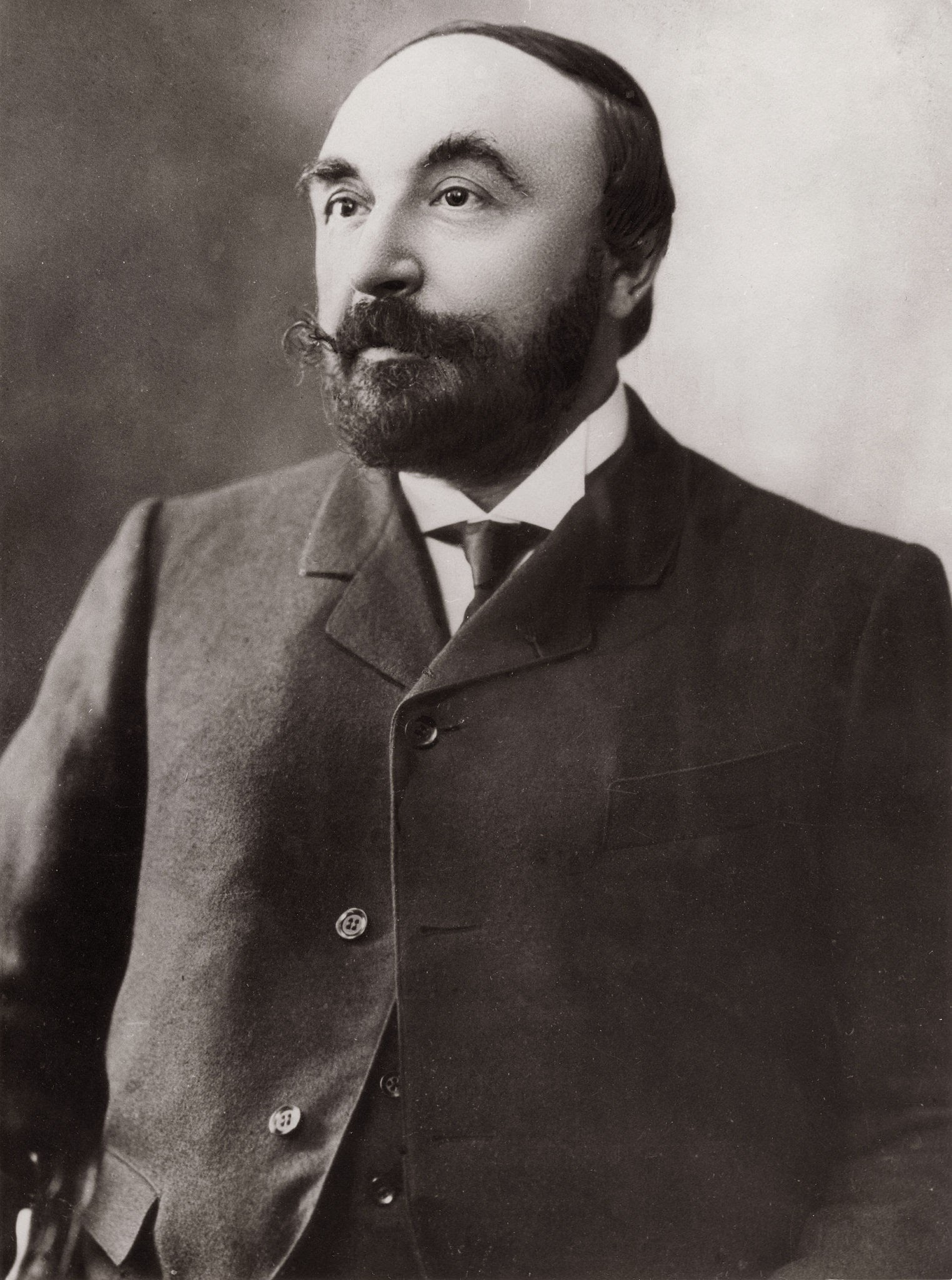
Despite the shared pseudonym of the two brothers, J.-H. Rosny aîné is the sole author of Les Xipéhuz.

Born in Belgium, Joseph Henri Honoré Boex, known as J.-H. Rosny aîné, settled in Paris in November 1883. Early in his career, he collaborated with his brother Séraphin Justin François, known as J.-H. Rosny jeune, under the shared pseudonym J.-H. Rosny. They published their first novel, Nell Horn, in 1886, establishing themselves as emerging figures in the naturalist movement led by Émile Zola. However, in 1887, following the release of Zola's The Earth, Rosny aîné publicly distanced himself from Zola. In an open letter, the Manifesto of the Five, co-signed by Paul Bonnetain, Lucien Descaves, Paul Margueritte, and Gustave Guiches, he criticized Zola for prioritizing vulgarity and lacking scientific rigor, relying instead on clichés.

Thus, after two naturalist stories—Nell Horn in 1886 and Le Bilatéral in March 1887—the two brothers published the collection L'Immolation in July 1887, which included the short story Les Xipéhuz alongside four other texts. Although this story is signed under the shared pseudonym J.-H. Rosny, it was actually written by J.-H. Rosny aîné alone. With this short story, the author moved away from the naturalism that had characterized his texts until then to produce literature that he wanted to be “more complex” in its understanding of the entire universe and, in particular, of individuals. Thus, seeking to distance himself from Émile Zola's pessimistic view of the inevitable decline of humanity, Rosny aîné instead set out to explore other possible types of evolution—not only of humanity, but also of various forms of life such as the Xipéhuz. Nevertheless, despite his distancing himself, he did not completely break with the naturalist movement, since in the 1925 edition published by Mercure de France, he dedicated the short story to Léon Hennique, a naturalist writer and friend of the author.

=== A fertile literary landscape for fantastic tales ===
The 1880s were a vibrant decade for fantastic literature in the Western world. Notable works included Edwin Abbott Abbott’s Flatland (1884), Henry Rider Haggard’s King Solomon's Mines (1885), Guy de Maupassant’s Le Horla (1886), Robert Louis Stevenson’s Strange Case of Dr Jekyll and Mr Hyde (1886), Auguste de Villiers de L'Isle-Adam’s Tomorrow's Eve (1886), and Mark Twain’s A Connecticut Yankee in King Arthur's Court (1889). Within this rich context, the Rosny brothers published Les Xipéhuz.

Rosny aîné pioneered the prehistoric fiction genre, which he helped popularize. The novella marked his first conjectural exploration of species survival. Leveraging his scientific knowledge, he crafted an original narrative pitting a prehistoric human tribe against a novel lifeform. Unlike contemporaries like Jules Verne, who used fiction to teach science, Rosny aîné used science to create fiction, hypothesizing a living mineral and exploring its implications. This approach aligned with the scientific romance genre, as later defined by Maurice Renard in 1909, establishing Rosny aîné as a key figure in its emergence in France.

== Plot ==
The narrative consists of two parts. First is a descriptive third-person description of encounters between neolithic tribes and the Xipéhuz, resulting in many deaths from mysterious weapons and powers. This is followed by meetings of the clans and tribes, ritual sacrifices, and assembly of an army which is defeated by the Xipéhuz.

The second part is the memoir of a wise man Bakhoûn who observes the Xipéhuz from afar, then carefully approaches them to find out their habits and vulnerabilities. Despite nearly being killed on several occasions, he discovers how individual Xipéhuz can be killed, and how to overwhelm them. He then describes a war of attrition where many thousands of warriors encircle the Xipéhuz and reduce their numbers, which have grown into the thousands, sacrificing many men to kill a greater number of the Xipéhuz. Finally the forest inhabited by the Xipéhuz is razed.

=== Book One ===
During the prehistoric era, the nomadic tribe of Pjehou encounters mysterious living crystals in a clearing. These entities, later called the Xipéhuz, suddenly attack, killing many warriors, forcing the survivors to flee. The pursuit halts at a certain boundary.

Following the massacre, the priests of the Zahelal tribes, to which Pjehou belongs, offer cattle, onagers, and stallions as sacrifices to the Xipéhuz and demarcate their territory to prevent accidental incursions.

The next spring, two tribes nearing the Xipéhuz territory are massacred. Survivors report that the Xipéhuz have multiplied rapidly, expanding their domain. The priests, after failing to burn the forest, ban further human intrusions. However, that autumn, another tribe camping near the forest is attacked and decimated.

Bakhoûn, a wise man who has abandoned nomadic life and embraces rational ideas over superstition, is approached by a Zahelal delegation. He dedicates himself to studying the Xipéhuz, documenting his observations in a book.

Over years, Bakhoûn observes that the Xipéhuz exhibit emotions like friendship and hatred, reproduce, and are mortal. He discovers they communicate via rays and identifies a vulnerability: the star at their base, the source of their rays, is susceptible to arrows.

Bakhoûn constructs a long-range bow and successfully kills a Xipéhuz by targeting its star, exulting in his discovery.

=== Book Two ===
Informed of the Xipéhuz's weakness, the Grand Council sends over 100,000 warriors from the Zahelal and neighboring tribes to confront them. After a demonstration by Bakhoûn's son, Loûm, the warriors attack. The Xipéhuz adapt their strategy, countering the humans and causing heavy losses. Bakhoûn, now supreme commander, devises a new tactic, leveraging the humans’ numerical advantage—35 times greater—to defeat the Xipéhuz, though at great cost.

After the final victory, Bakhoûn, standing alone at the edge of the Kzour forest, mourns the extinction of the Xipéhuz.

=== The Zahelal People ===
The story unfolds in the year 22649 of the Zahelal calendar, set a thousand years before the rise of Nineveh, Babylon, and Ecbatana, around the 6th millennium BC in the ancient Near East.

The region is inhabited by nomadic tribes forming various peoples. The Pjehou tribe, part of the Zahelal people—a nomadic, animist group of 50 tribes led by a Supreme High Priest and the Grand Council—encounters the Xipéhuz first. Powerless against the Xipéhuz, the priests seek Bakhoûn, a solitary, rational thinker from the Ptuh tribe known for his wisdom. Rejecting superstition and nomadic life, Bakhoûn foreshadows an empirical philosopher, relying on observation and experience. He also exhibits democratic ideals, refusing monarchical power after defeating the Xipéhuz.

As an explorer—a recurring figure in Rosny aîné's works—Bakhoûn discovers the Xipéhuz's weakness. Leading 100,000 Zahelal warriors and 40,000 from neighboring tribes (Dzoums, Sahrs, Khaldes, Xisoastres, Pjarvanns), he secures humanity's triumph, though he laments the loss of the Xipéhuz species.

== The Xipéhuz ==
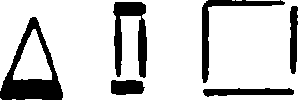
Some drawings used by the Xipéhuz for communication

The Xipéhuz are mineral beings who can change their shape: cone, cylinder, prism. They move by sliding over the ground. Bakhoûn learned that they are sentient beings capable of emotions towards each other and that they are mortal. At the base of their body there is a bright star that emits the ray with which they kill people and use to communicate among themselves by drawing shapes on each other's bodies. Bakhoûn also learned that the star is their weak point.

== Themes ==
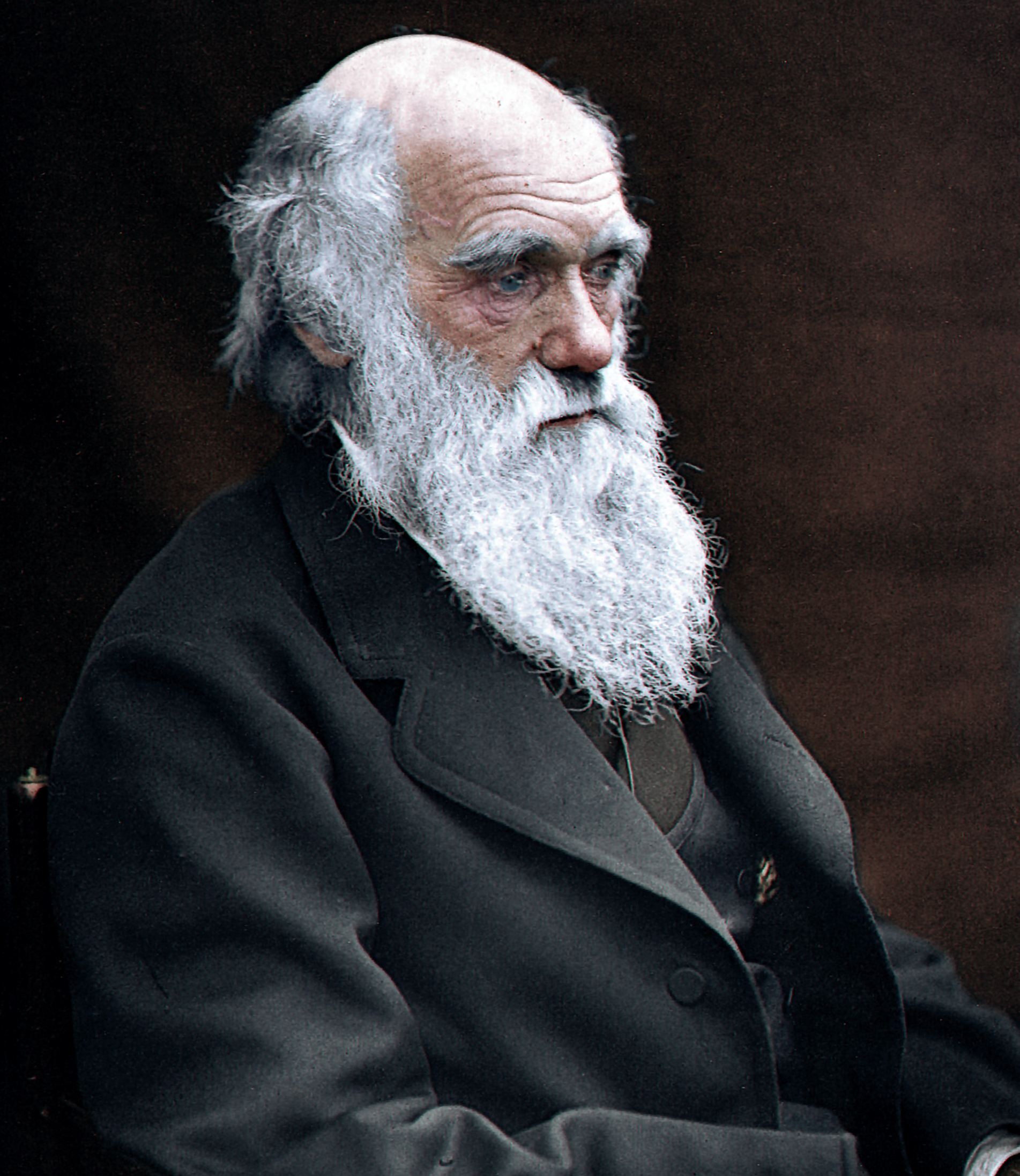
Present throughout Rosny aîné's literary work, Darwinian thought permeates the story Les Xipéhuz in particular.

=== The "War of the Kingdoms" and Darwinism ===
Les Xipéhuz introduces the conflict between humanity and competing species in a biopolitical struggle. The evolutionary dynamics preclude peaceful coexistence, framing the conflict as a struggle for survival. Humanity faces a formidable mineral kingdom, previously underestimated as a threat.

Inspired by naturalists like Jean-Baptiste Lamarck and Charles Darwin, Rosny aîné imagines minerals participating in the evolutionary process. Drawing on the chemical advancements of Friedrich Wöhler in the 1820s and Marcellin Berthelot in the 1850s–1860s, which blurred the line between inorganic and organic matter, he envisions the Xipéhuz as minerals that naturally acquired life through evolution.

Unlike contemporary works like H. G. Wells’ The War of the Worlds, where Martians are depicted as monstrous foes and human victory is a moral triumph, Rosny aîné portrays the human victory as an evolutionary leap driven by rational thought, particularly through Bakhoûn’s innovative ideas. Influenced by British evolutionary debates during his time in England, Rosny aîné presents human history as a dynamic interaction with the environment, devoid of preconceived notions.

The struggle for survival necessitates destruction, making the annihilation of one species inevitable. Rosny aîné embraces this Darwinian fatalism, using the term "murder" to describe the Xipéhuz's destruction.

The "war of the kingdoms" is central to Rosny aîné's oeuvre. While Les Xipéhuz depicts humanity's triumph through rational thought, his later work, The Death of the Earth (1910), portrays humanity's extinction, succeeded by the Ferromagnétaux, a mineral species emerging from human ruins, suggesting a final revenge of the mineral kingdom.

=== The triumph of rational thought ===
The initial encounter between the Pjehou tribe and the Xipéhuz sparks superstitious fear, with the Zahelal high priest attributing divine powers to the creatures. After failed animal sacrifices lead to more deaths, the priests turn to Bakhoûn. Bakhoûn, employing a scientific method, saves humanity through years of meticulous observation, documenting the Xipéhuz's behaviors, diet, locomotion, and reproduction on 60 tablets in "pre-cuneiform writing."

Bakhoûn's rational approach marks him as a harbinger of a superior humanity. His rejection of superstition and embrace of mathematical and experimental methods signify the power of reason, ensuring humanity's dominance as the fittest species. By overcoming the priests’ superstitious views, Bakhoûn's modern ideas herald a new era of human civilization.

=== Alterity as biological diversity ===
I am the only one in France who, with Les Xipéhuz, has given a new kind of fantastic, one outside of humanity.

Amid the 19th-century resurgence of dinosaurs and prehistoric humans through archaeology and paleontology, prehistoric fiction gained popularity in the 1880s. Rosny aîné explored animal alterity with a fantastical zoology, approaching the Other through the enigmatic Xipéhuz.

Unlike contemporary works like Maupassant's Le Horla or Wells’ The War of the Worlds, which evoke superstitious fear, Rosny aîné shifts to a rational perspective through Bakhoûn's observations. By humanizing the Xipéhuz—comparing their color changes to human expressions—Bakhoûn transforms the perception of the alien Other. Rosny aîné pioneers an egalitarian view of non-human entities.

However, understanding alterity leads to its destruction. Bakhoûn's discovery of the Xipéhuz's weakness enables their eradication, yet he mourns their loss, reflecting a moral conflict between empathy for an intelligent species and the necessity of survival. The use of "murder" underscores his guilt, highlighting Rosny aîné's vision of life's diverse forms.

== Narrative strategy ==
The narrative employs two narrators: a heterodiegetic modern narrator and a homodiegetic Bakhoûn. Despite an apparent balance, Bakhoûn's perspective dominates, occupying 70% of the narrative, with the modern narrator covering 30%. The first book alternates between the two, while the second focuses solely on Bakhoûn.

To enhance credibility, Rosny aîné uses strategies like shifting to Bakhoûn's voice, presenting the story as an excerpt from his pre-cuneiform tablets, and referencing a fictitious translation by B. Dessault in Les Précurseurs de Ninive published by Calmann-Lévy. The Kensington Museum reference is also fictional, as it was known as the South Kensington Museum in 1887. Faux footnotes and Xipéhuz glyphs further enhance the effect of reality.

Yet, the story remains a secret among a select group of scholars, not integrated into broader history. Bakhoûn's tablets, intended for future generations, represent a scientific Revelation, competing with sacred texts like the Cain myth, as Bakhoûn laments the "murder" of the Xipéhuz.

Rosny aîné builds a fantastic narrative through a poetic depiction of the Xipéhuz's diverse forms and colors, followed by Bakhoûn's scientific analysis of their behaviors. Paradoxically, this rational approach deepens the mystery, enhancing the fantastic element.

Rosny aîné's conjectural narratives often focus on love and desire as drivers of species perpetuation. Eric Lysøe suggests that Bakhoûn's act of killing a Xipéhuz is depicted with sexual undertones, resembling a symbolic violation, culminating in a triumphant cry akin to an orgasm.

== Publications ==
=== Over thirteen decades of French editions ===
The novella was first published by Albert Savine in the collection L'Immolation in July 1887, followed by a standalone edition in December 1887. Amid financial troubles at Albert Savine in the 1890s, the novella was acquired by Mercure de France, regularly republished from 1896 to 1925, with chapter numbering finalized.

The bi-monthly magazine Les Belles Lectures featured the story in its November 1951 issue. It was frequently republished in collections, such as Georges Crès’s Les Autres Vies et les autres mondes (1924), Éditions Denoël’s La Mort de la Terre (1958) in the Présence du futur series, and Marabout’s La Force mystérieuse suivi de Les Xipéhuz and Récits de Science-Fiction in the 1970s. Gallimard’s youth division published La Mort de la Terre in the "1000 soleils" series (1976), followed by Tallandier's Vamireh, suivi de Les Xipéhuz (1977), NéO's La Force mystérieuse, suivi de Les Xipéhuz (1982), Robert Laffont’s Romans préhistoriques de J.-H. Rosny aîné (1985) and La Guerre du feu et autres romans préhistoriques (2002), and Omnibus’s Chasseurs de chimères (2006). After entering the public domain in 2011, it appeared in Bragelonne’s La Guerre des règnes (2012), an illustrated edition by Kiki Picasso (2013), L'École des Loisirs’s Robots et chaos (2018), and Okno Éditions’ Récits de Science-Fiction (2021).

=== International editions ===
A partial Russian translation appeared in 1903. The first complete translation, in Romanian, came in 1965, followed by an English translation by Damon Knight in 1968, titled The Shapes. This version, frequently republished, served as the basis for Spanish (Las Formas, 1970) and Brazilian (As Formas, 1971) translations. Further English translations followed by George E. Slusser and Danièle Chatelain (1978), Georges T. Dodds (1986), Brian Stableford (2010), and Jason Colavito (2012). Additional translations include Hungarian (1973), German (1978), Italian (1988), and Russian (2003).

== Reception and legacy ==
=== Critical reception ===
Upon release, the novella received widespread acclaim. Alphonse Daudet found its fantastic elements "new and terrifying," surpassing even Le Horla and Gordon Pym. Critic Gustave Geffroy described it as a "cleverly crafted mystifying hypothesis" and a "charming and scholarly fantasy on the life of matter" in La Justice on July 23, 1888.

In August 1896, Rachilde lauded the novella in Mercure de France, calling it "genius" for its ability to convey a "sensation of scientific truth" within a highly imaginative fiction.

In the early 20th century, Maurice Renard retroactively recognized Rosny aîné as the creator of the scientific romance genre with Les Xipéhuz. Its innovative approach to themes that shaped modern science fiction led Serge Lehman to mark its publication as the start of the "Golden Age of French science fiction" until the mid-20th century. Continuously republished into the 20th and 21st centuries, the novella is celebrated as a masterpiece of speculative fiction for its originality and profound sense of alterity.

=== Adaptations and tributes ===
The novella inspired two comic book adaptations. The first, scripted by Raymonde Borel-Rosny and drawn by Robert Bressy, appeared in L'Humanité from May 17 to July 4, 1975. In June 1979, François Bourgeon illustrated excerpts in the comics magazine À Suivre issue 17.

The work inspired literary tributes, including references in Alfred Jarry’s Les Jours et les Nuits (1897), Théo Varlet’s La Grande Panne (1930), Henri Vernes’s Bob Morane adventure (1996), and Jean-Marc Lofficier’s anthology series Les Compagnons de l'Ombre (since 2007). In the comic La Brigade chimérique (2009–2010), Serge Lehman and Fabrice Colin include a Xipéhuz fossil in Irène Joliot-Curie’s lab.

In the 1980s, the Xipéhuz inspired the French role-playing game Galactic Empire (1984) as an alien civilization and an exhibition by the artist duo COZIC at the Centre d'exposition d'art céramique contemporain (CIRCA) in Montreal from September 17 to October 29, 1988.

=== Intelligent inorganic forms in science fiction ===
J.-H. Rosny aîné was among the first to explore humanity’s confrontation with self-organized intelligent inorganic systems. He revisited this theme in his post-apocalyptic novel The Death of the Earth (1910), where the Ferromagnétaux, mineral beings emerging from human ruins, supplant humanity. Later authors, such as Léon Groc in La Révolte des pierres (1929) and Theodore Sturgeon in The Dreaming Jewels (1950), depicted sentient mineral entities, often of extraterrestrial origin, unlike Rosny aîné’s Xipéhuz.

== Analysis ==
Some contemporary commentators, inspired by later writings, describe the Xipéhuz as extraterrestrial lifeforms. However this is a later interpretation: it could equally be simply a form from another evolutionary line than organic life. The authors do not provide any additional information, merely noting the existence of this non-organic intelligence and its interaction with Neolithic humans. A form of non-organic life on Earth (without the extraterrestrial implication) is also described in another work of Rosny Aîné, The Death of Earth.

The text has sometimes been held as the first true science fiction story. "Before Rosny science fiction did not exist," writes Jacques Van Herp, "There only existed a close literature: social science fiction... There was never an event or life-form contrary to what we could otherwise understand, for there was no real science fiction, only when an author "invented" a new science". J.H. Rosny aîné himself said: "I am the only one in France who has given, with "Les Xipéhuz," something new and fantastic, that is to say beyond humanity."

== Translations ==
- English:
  - The Shapes, translation by Damon Knight, in A Hundred Years of Science Fiction, ed. Damon Knight, (Simon and Schuster, 1968).
  - The Xipéhuz translation by Brian Stableford, 2010, ISBN 978-1-935558-35-4
- German: Die Xipehuz
  - by Michael and Cornelia Rumpf, 1978
  - by Angela von Hagen, 1983
- Russian: Ксипехузы, by Аркадий Маркович Григорьев, 1967

== Bibliography ==
- Costes, Guy; Altairac, Joseph (2018). Rétrofictions, encyclopédie de la conjecture romanesque rationnelle francophone|Rétrofictions, encyclopédie de la conjecture romanesque rationnelle francophone, de Rabelais à Barjavel, 1532-1951 [Retrofictions, encyclopedia of rational French-language fictional conjecture|Retrofictions, encyclopedia of rational French-language fictional conjecture, from Rabelais to Barjavel, 1532-1951]. Interface (in French). Vol. 1: A-L, 2: M-Z. Amiens/Paris: Encrage/Les Belles Lettres. p. 2458. ISBN 978-2-251-44851-0.
- Gouanvic, Jean-Marc (1994). La science-fiction française au XXe siècle (1900-1968) [French Science Fiction in the 20th Century (1900-1968)]. Faux titre: études de langue et littérature françaises. Amsterdam: Rodopi. p. 292. ISBN 978-90-5183-775-9.
- Lysøe, Éric (1993). Les Kermesses de l'Étrange ou Le Conte fantastique en Belgique du romantisme au symbolisme [The Kermesses of the Strange or The Fantastic Tale in Belgium from Romanticism to Symbolism]. Paris: A. G. Nizet. p. 590. ISBN 2-7078-1175-0.
- Bernard, Claudie (2021). "Écrire l'Histoire d'avant l'écriture : La Guerre du feu et Les Xipéhuz de Rosny aîné" [Writing History Before Writing: The War of Fire and Les Xipéhuz by Rosny aîné]. Si l'Histoire m'était contée [If History Were Told to Me]. Études romantiques et dix-neuviémistes. Paris: Classiques Garnier]. pp. 295–320. doi:10.48611/isbn.978-2-406-12188-6.p.0295. ISBN 978-2-406-12186-2.
- Chatelain, Danièle; Slusser, George (2012). "Introduction". In J.-H. Rosny aîné (ed.). Three Science Fiction Novellas. Middletown, CT: Wesleyan University Press. p. ix-lxxxiii. ISBN 978-0-8195-6945-5.
- Chelebourg, Christian (Autumn 2006). "Rosny aîné and Other Forms" [The Disordered World of J.-H. Rosny aîné or the Thrill of the Unknown]. Otrante. Art et littérature fantastiques (19–20). Paris: Éditions Kimé: 65–80. ISBN 2-84174-411-6.
- Clermont, Philippe (Autumn 2006). "Rosny aîné and Other Forms" [Visions of Alterity in Rosny aîné]. Otrante. Art et littérature fantastiques (19–20). Paris: Éditions Kimé: 81–95. ISBN 2-84174-411-6.
- Ferrari, Silvio (1998). "Xipéhuz, Ferromagnétaux, Mutants et Variants" [Xipéhuz, Ferromagnétaux, Mutants, and Variants] (PDF). Francofonía (7). Cádiz: University of Cádiz: 123–134. ISSN 1132-3310.
- Gourdet, Anna (2006). "Zola - Maupassant - Rosny" [Alternative Alterities]. Les Cahiers naturalistes (80): 177–192. ISBN 2-912012-11-2.
- Lehman, Serge (2020). "Une Littérature plus complexe et plus haute" [A More Complex and Higher Literature]. In J.-H. Rosny aîné (ed.). La guerre des règnes [The War of the Kingdoms]. Paris: Bragelonne. pp. 757–785. ISBN 979-10-281-0774-1.
- Lord, Christina (2019). "Facing the Science-Fictional Other". Nineteenth-Century French Studies. 48 (1–2). Lincoln, NE: University of Nebraska Press: 149–165. doi:10.1353/ncf.2019.0019. ISSN 0146-7891.
- Lysøe, Éric (Autumn 2006). "Rosny aîné and Other Forms" [Rosny aîné or the Fantastic at Work]. Otrante. Art et littérature fantastiques (19–20). Paris: Éditions Kimé: 37–64. ISBN 2-84174-411-6.
- Maraud, André (January–February 1986). "H.G. Wells & Rosny aîné" [The Text at the Origin of History]. Europe (681–682): 101–106. ISSN 0014-2751.
- Meynard, Cécile (2021). "Utopias and Short Forms" [Utopia/Dystopia in "Les Xipéhuz" and The Death of the Earth by J.-H. Rosny aîné]. Mélanges de science religieuse. 78 (3). Lille: Université catholique de Lille: 23–40. ISSN 0025-8911.
- Rosny, J. H. (1887). Les Xipéhuz (in French). Paris: Albert Savine.
- Sukiennicka, Marta (2019). "Formes de vie minérale dans les récits d'imagination scientifique de Rosny aîné" [Forms of Mineral Life in Rosny aîné’s Scientific Imagination Stories]. In M. Loba, B. Łuczak (ed.). Formes du vivant, formes de littérature [Forms of Life, Forms of Literature] (PDF). Poznań: Wydawnictwo Naukowe UAM. pp. 67–83. ISBN 978-83-232-3498-2.
