= Eaton Collection =

Fiction collection at the University of California, Riverside library

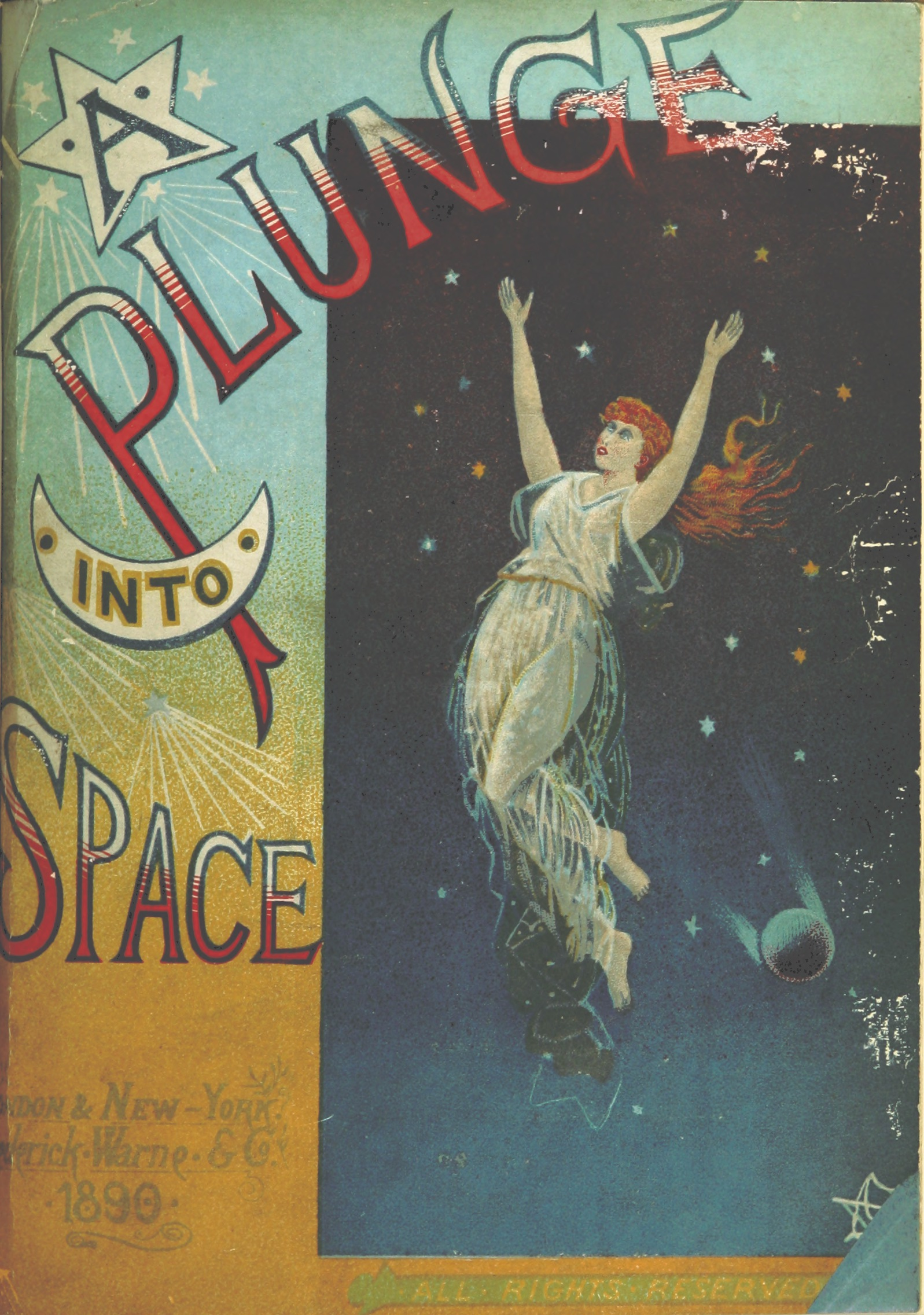
A Plunge into Space by Robert Cromie (1890), a rare book in the Eaton Collection

The Eaton Collection of Science Fiction and Fantasy, formerly known as the J. Lloyd Eaton Collection of Science Fiction, Fantasy, Horror, and Utopian Literature, is "the largest publicly accessible collection of science fiction, fantasy, horror and utopian and dystopian literature in the world". It is housed in Special Collections and Archives of the UCR Libraries at the University of California, Riverside. It consists of more than 300,000 items, including hardcover and paperback books, SF fanzines, film and visual material, and comic books, including manga and anime, as well as a variety of archival materials.

== Eaton ==
Dr. J. Lloyd Eaton
- Born: July 8, 1902; Berkeley, California
- Died: December 22, 1968 (aged 66); Berkeley, California
- Education: University of California, Berkeley UC Medical School (1928)
- Occupation: Medical doctor

J. Lloyd Eaton was a pulmonologist specializing in the treatment of tuberculosis. While still in high school he collected science fiction and fantasy pulp literature. By the 1940s he communicated with book dealers in London and New York to acquire more books, expanding to the detective and western genres at a time when science fiction was an obscure interest. Eaton had particular interest in stories of future war or lost race from before the 1920s by authors such as John Polidori, Frank Aubrey, and Edgar Rice Burroughs. Eaton was also the first president of the Elves, Gnomes, and Little Men's Science Fiction, Chowder, and Marching Society, and served as the editor of the group's sercon fanzine, The Rhodomagnetic Digest. When Eaton's family sought a home for his collection, science fiction was considered an inferior literary product—pleasant enough as a diversion, but unworthy of serious academic study. As even public libraries did not regularly acquire science fiction, there was no comprehensive collection available anywhere outside of private hands.

== History of the collection ==
Dr. Eaton's collection, acquired by UCR's University Librarian Donald Wilson in 1969, consisted of about 7,500 hardback editions of science fiction, fantasy, and horror from the late nineteenth century to 1955. The development of the collection continued under University Librarian Eleanor Montague, who created the position of Eaton Curator, hiring for the position George Slusser, a Harvard-trained literary scholar. When Hal W. Hall catalogued the growing Eaton Collection in 1975 for his then-upcoming Anatomy of Wonder bibliography, he determined the collection consisted of "over 8,500 volumes, and is particularly rich in early and scarce items published from 1870 to 1930, along with some important eighteenth-century titles."

During Slusser's 25-year curatorship, the Eaton collection grew to more than 100,000 volumes, ranging from the 1517 edition of Thomas More's Utopia to the most recently published titles. The collection includes first editions of Bram Stoker's Dracula, H. G. Wells's The War of the Worlds and The Time Machine, Mary Shelley's Frankenstein, Fantastic Four #1, and Action Comics #1. Foreign works of science fiction have been added systematically, including works in Chinese, Czech, French, German, Hebrew, Japanese, Polish, Portuguese, Romanian, Russian, and Spanish. The collection also includes journals, comic books, and fanzines, primarily acquired as donations from collectors Terry Carr, Bruce Pelz, Fred Patten, and Rick Sneary. Some of the extensive texts maintained by the collection were used in the 1970s by Arno Press for reprints of Supernatural and Occult Fiction and Lost Race and Adult Fantasy Fiction.

In recent years, films, videos, DVDs, scripts and storyboards from TV series including Alien Nation and The X-Files, and other illustrated narratives have been added, most of which were donated. The archival holdings comprise the papers of leading science fiction and fantasy authors, including Gregory Benford, David Brin, F. M. Busby, Michael Cassutt, Robert L. Forward, Anne McCaffrey, William Rotsler, James White, and Colin Wilson. From 1986 to 1991, one of Slusser's students, author Daryl F. Mallett was instrumental in reaching out to authors and fans and asking if they would donate their archives, as well as starting a duplicate-asset trading program with the University of Michigan, which provided the Eaton Collection with its massive comic book collection.

From 1988 to 1990, the Collection published three issues of J. Lloyd Eaton Collection Newsletter "designed to alert scholars of new acquisitions and happenings in the Eaton Collection".

In 2014, George Slusser was asked how he assembled the world's largest SF collection: "By silence, exile and cunning", he replied. "And I did have allies in the library, who found funds to buy books, even when academics sought to block purchases. Librarians love books, and SF had a lot of them, with interesting covers and formats."

== Eaton Conference on Speculative Fiction ==
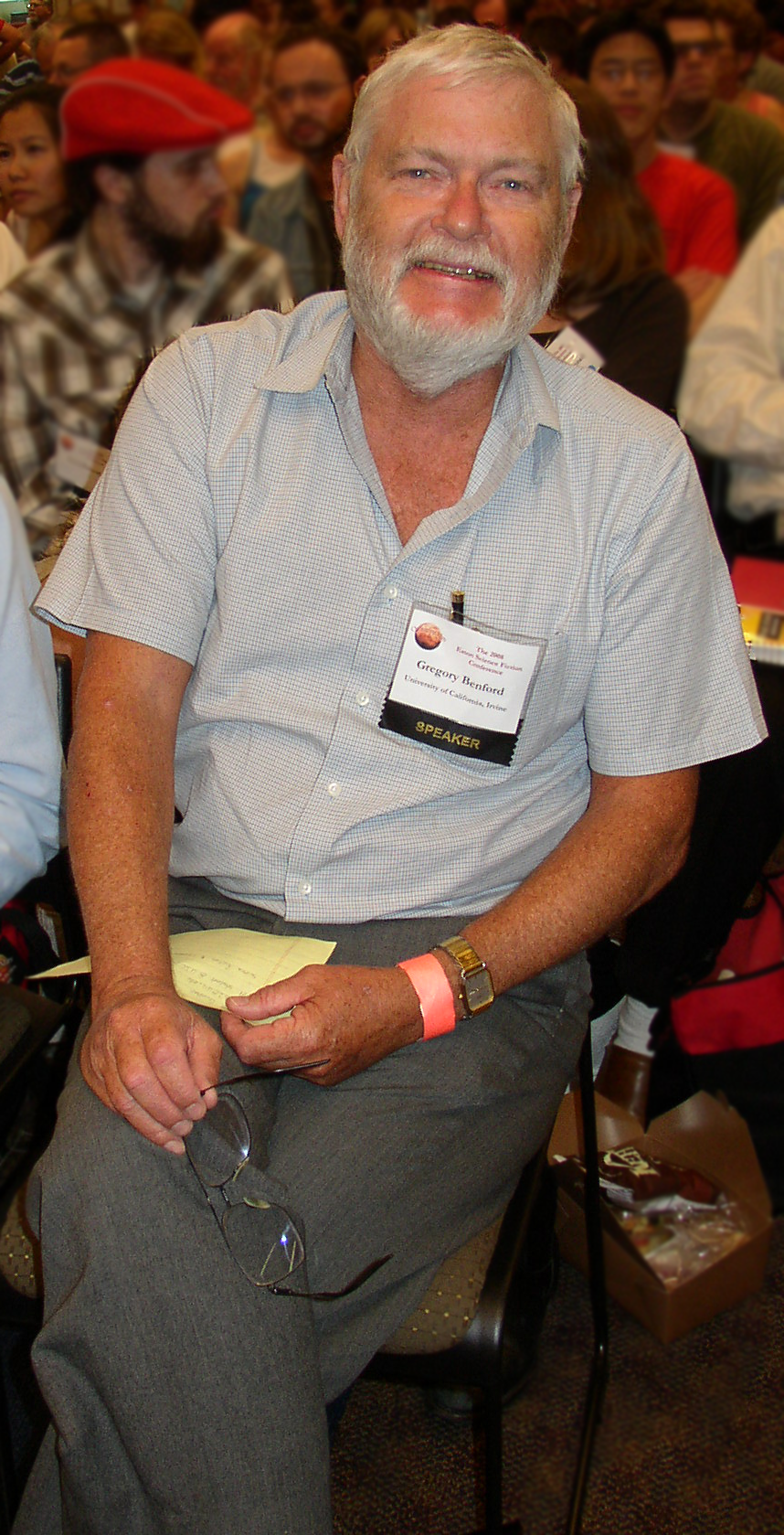
Greg Benford, Eaton SF Conference, 2008-05-17

As part of its scholarly mission, the Eaton Collection hosts the Eaton Conference on Speculative Fiction, which was inaugurated in 1979 as the J. Lloyd Eaton Science Conference and later renamed to the Eaton Science Fiction Conference. As of 2025, some 22 conferences have been held at UC Riverside, while others have taken place at international venues, co-sponsored by UCR and various host institutions: London Polytechnic University, 1984; the Sorbonne Nouvelle, 1986; University of Leeds, 1989; Texas A&M University, 1990; the Maison d'Ailleurs, Yverdon-les-bains, and the Université de Neuchâtel, 1991; Imperial College, London, 1995; the Chinese University of Hong Kong, 2000, and the Science Fiction Museum in Seattle in 2005. Conference attendees have included writers and creatives such as Brian Aldiss, Ray Bradbury, David Brin, Samuel R. Delany, Larry Niven, Kim Stanley Robinson, Ursula K. LeGuin, Robert Silverberg, Theodore Sturgeon, Roger Zelazny, Nalo Hopkinson, China Miéville, Malik Gaines, and Alexandro Segade as well as well-known critics of the genre and scientists like Frederic Jameson, Harold Bloom, Leslie Fiedler, Harry Levin, Marvin Minsky, Robert Scholes, and Steven Shaviro. The Conference has produced more than twenty volumes of critical essays, published by various university presses.

After an initial three-year gap, the conference resumed in May 2008, with the theme "Chronicling Mars". From 2009-2013 the conference was held biennially during odd-number years. Following another hiatus, this time a decade long, graduate students and faculty in UCR's English department organized the return of the Eaton Conference, starting with a one-day Eaton Symposium on Speculative Fiction held May 25, 2024. The conference made a more formal return the following year, with a two day conference held April 4th-5th, 2025 on the theme “Reimagining the Archive”. In January 2025 the Jay Kay and Doris Klein Science Fiction Librarian at UCR also hosted an online Eaton symposium.

== Eaton Award ==
The now biennial conference sponsors the J. Lloyd Eaton Memorial Award. From 1979 to 2001 it recognized the "best critical book of each year", although it was not precisely annual. From 2008 it is a lifetime achievement award, in full the J. Lloyd Eaton Lifetime Achievement Award in Science Fiction, recognizing "contributions of lasting significance to the field". The four recipients to 2011 were Ray Bradbury, Frederik Pohl, Samuel R. Delany, and Harlan Ellison. Ursula K. Le Guin is the Eaton Lifetime Achievement Award winner for 2012. Both Ray Harryhausen and Stan Lee have been named for 2013 "to honor both science fiction film culture and science fiction comic book culture".

== See also ==
- Science fiction studies
