= The Quest for Fire =

1911 fantasy novel by J.-H. Rosny

Quest for Fire
- First US edition
- Author: J.-H. Rosny
- Original title: La Guerre du feu
- Translator: H Talbott
- Illustrator: J. O. Bercher
- Language: French
- Genre: Historical, Prehistoric fiction, Adventure novel, Fantasy
- Publisher: Pantheon Books (US)
- Publication date: 1911
- Publication place: Belgium
- English publication date: 1967
- Media type: Print (hardback & paperback)
- ISBN: 0-14-006434-6 (UK Eng. trans.) & ISBN 0-345-30067-X (US Eng. trans.)
- OCLC: 10813236

The Quest for Fire (French: La Guerre du feu, literally The War of Fire) is a 1911 Belgian fantasy novel by J.-H. Rosny, the pseudonym of two brothers; the author was actually the elder of the two, Joseph Henri Honoré Boex (1856–1940). It was first published in English in an abridged edition in 1967.

== Setting ==
The Quest for Fire takes place in 100,000 BC in Europe. The fauna of this period is omnipresent, including: mammoths, cave lions, aurochs, cave bears, saber-toothed cats, giant elks and saiga antelopes. Several humanoid species live alongside animals:

1. The Ulams - Neanderthal-like hunter-gatherers who worship the fire and are able to ally themselves with beasts.
2. The Wahs - People without shoulders from marshes.
3. The Blue-Haired Men - Huge four-handed simians with a bluish fur.
4. The Men-Eaters - Bestial cannibals.
5. The Red Dwarfs - Extremely warmongering and xenophobic pygmies.

== Scientific response ==
Italian paleontologist Giorgio Manzi praised both the novel and its movie adaptation for their prescient vision: for him, they can alternatively be seen as a journey through human evolution, where the protagonists meet different species of Homo that succeeded one another through time; or, as a journey through space, with different human species that coexisted (and interbred) in different parts of the world. Finally, they could also be seen as a representation of diversity within Neanderthals, that are now known to have had "modern" traits, like the production of jewelry, but to also have engaged in cannibalism.

== Adaptation ==
It was adapted into the critically acclaimed 1981 film Quest for Fire starring Everett McGill, Ron Perlman, Nicholas Kadi, and Rae Dawn Chong. The film is not a faithful adaptation of the book.
