= Maxime Leroy =

French jurist and social historian (1873–1957)

- Born: Maxime Auguste Joseph Laurent Léon Leroy; 28 March 1873; Paris
- Died: 15 September 1957 (aged 84); Paris
- Occupation(s): Jurist; Historian

Maxime Leroy (28 March 1873 – 15 September 1957) was a French jurist and social historian.

== Career ==
Maxime Leroy studied law at the university of Nancy, where he obtained his doctorate in 1898. A friend of Victor Griffuelhes and Alphonse Merrheim, he devoted his first works to the development of trade unionism and its legal and social impact. In 1909 he founded the "Société des amis du lac" at Soorts-Hossegor, where writers such as J.-H. Rosny jeune, Paul Margueritte and Gaston Chérau had been meeting for some years. A member of the Human Rights League of France and a supporter of the League of Nations, he participated in numerous international meetings and had a correspondence with Sigmund Freud and H.G. Wells. From 1937, he was a professor at the École libre des sciences politiques. His most important work, Histoire des idées sociales en France, was published in three volumes between 1946 and 1954. For the Bibliothèque de la Pléiade, he edited the Port-Royal by Sainte-Beuve, published in 1953. He was elected a member of the Académie des sciences morales et politiques in 1954.

== Works ==
- 1898: L'Esprit de la législation napoléonienne, esquisse d'une étude critique
- 1904: Le Code civil et le droit nouveau
- 1905: Le Droit des fonctionnaires
- 1907: Les Transformations de la puissance publique : les syndicats de fonctionnaires
- 1908: La Loi : essai sur la théorie de l'autorité dans la démocratie
- 1909: Syndicats et services publics : histoire de l'organisation ouvrière jusqu'à la C.G.T., les syndicats ouvriers et la loi, la crise des services publics, les associations de fonctionnaires
- 1913: La Coutume ouvrière, syndicats, bourses du travail, fédérations professionnelles, coopératives, doctrines et institutions (2 volumes)
- 1914: L'Alsace-Lorraine, porte de France, porte d'Allemagne
- 1917: L'Ère Wilson : la Société des Nations
- 1921: Les Techniques nouvelles du syndicalisme
- 1922: Vers une république heureuse
- 1924: Henri de Saint-Simon : le socialisme des producteurs
- 1925: La Vie véritable du comte Henri de Saint-Simon : 1760–1825
- 1925: Les Premiers Amis français de Wagner
- 1927: La Ville française : institutions et libertés locales
- 1928: Fénelon
- 1929: Stendhal politique
- 1929: Descartes, le philosophe au masque (2 volumes)
- 1931: Descartes social
- 1932: La Société des Nations. Guerre ou paix ?
- 1933: Taine
- 1935: Introduction à l'art de gouverner
- 1936: Soorts-Hossegor
- 1937: Les Tendances du pouvoir et de la liberté en France au XXe siècle
- 1939: Le Mythe du phénix dans les littératures grecque et latine, with Jean Hubaux.
- 1940: La Pensée de Sainte-Beuve
- 1941: La Politique de Sainte-Beuve
- 1946–1954: Histoire des idées sociales en France (3 volumes)
- 1947: Le Socialisme (3 volumes)
- 1947: Vie de Sainte-Beuve
- 1948: Les Précurseurs français du socialisme de Condorcet à Proudhon, texts compiled and presented by Maxime Leroy

== Bibliography ==
- Jean-Claude Drouin, Un homme de lettres à Hossegor, Maxime Leroy 1873-1957, Association Littéraire des Amis du Lac d'Hossegor, 2004.
