= Lords of the Starship =

1967 novel by Mark S. Geston

- First edition cover by John Schoenherr
- Author: Mark S. Geston
- Cover artist: John Schoenherr
- Language: English
- Genre: Science fiction
- Published: 1967 Ace Books
- Publication place: United States
- Media type: Print (paperback)
- Pages: 156
- OCLC: 426089

Lords of the Starship is a 1967 science fiction novel by American author Mark S. Geston. His debut work, it was written while he was a sophomore at Kenyon College. It was originally published in paperback by Ace Books, then reprinted for the British market in hardcover by Michael Joseph in 1971 and in paperback by Sphere Books a year later. Gregg Press published an archival edition in 1978 (a facsimile of the Michael Joseph edition); and Baen Books included it in its 2009 omnibus of Geston's early novels, The Books of the Wars.

The novel takes a darkly cynical view of human nature; some critics have called it a very black comedy.

== Plot summary ==
In the far future, on an Earth devastated by millennia of war, the Caroline Republic is hostile towards its neighbors despite sharing their dire economic straits. Outside the declining remains of civilization lie ruins and wastelands populated by mutants and monsters. It is generally felt that humanity lost its vitality long ago.

The aged veteran General Toriman approaches a leading politician of the Caroline with an audacious, centuries-long scheme to rebuild the nation: seizing control of an ancient shipyard, hundreds of miles away, that was evidently designed to build spacecraft. Officially, the project’s goal is to construct a spaceship seven miles long, the Victory, which would carry the population of a despairing world to a paradise planet called “Home.” In truth, the ship will never be finished. The effort itself is the point: it will revitalize the nation’s economy and, perhaps, restore the quality that mankind has lost.

General Toriman dies and the cynical politicians of the Republic rouse the population to begin the project. The River Road from the Caroline homeland to the Yards is forced with a bloody battle between a Caroline military force and mutants, during which the ghost of the ancient hero Miolnor IV appears to save the day.

Work begins on constructing the ship. Despite their antiquity, the Yards' machinery and buildings seem to have been perfectly preserved and materials for the construction of the ship are discovered. Legends say that the fortifications still standing nearby defended human civilization against Dark Powers over the mountains to the west.

The magnificent city of Gateway grows in the hills above the Yards while the Victory slowly takes shape. Much of the population of the Caroline moves to the Yards and its society is formally divided into two classes. The Technos supervise construction and are aware of the motivational "myth of the ship" plan while the People believe that the voyage to the planet Home is the actual goal.

Some Technos realize that, although Gateway has become rich and prosperous through the Victory project, the Caroline homeland is still as miserable as its neighbors. Before they can act on this knowledge the People revolt, led by a man named Coral who claims truthfully that the Technos have lied and do not intend to complete the Victory. Most of the Technos are killed although one is allowed to bring the news to the Dresau Islands in the eastern sea. The Dresau Navy has a proud tradition as the last surviving remnant of vital humanity and its leader believes the Victory project has a sinister purpose, possibly directed by heirs of the dark power Salasar, which once ruled most of the earth.

After almost two centuries of construction, the Victory is completed and the women and children of the People are placed aboard in suspended animation. Led by the Dresau Navy the gathered enemies of Coral's triumphant People attack with their restored ships and scavenged weapons. The defenses of the Caroline Empire are ineffective, and an apocalyptic battle rages about the Yards, with millions fighting. At the height of the battle the sea turns red with blood and the dead of past wars rise in support of the assault. The legendary fortresses fire missiles toward the west.

Before any of the men of the People board the Victory it moves down the ways to the sea. It turns its huge engines toward the shore and they ignite, incinerating the fighting armies, ships, Yards, and Gateway. The Victory then redirects the destruction onto itself and its millions of passengers. Balls of fire arrive over the mountains to complete the destruction.

When the wreckage of the Yards has cooled, the man who has been called General Toriman, the ghost of Miolnor IV, and Coral arrives. The Victory project and its opposition have been devised by the heirs of Salasar. He signals the completion of the project; the military powers of the east have been destroyed and invasion by those in the west can begin.

== Reception ==
Algis Budrys, although praising Geston as a promising new writer and finding "quite a bit of enjoyment" in the novel, concluded that Lords of the Starship was "a bad and disappointing book on its own terms." Brian Stableford characterized it as an "earnestly stylish stud[y] of terminal cultural decadence".
