= Arthur Xhignesse =

Belgian writer

Arthur Xhignesse (born 1873, died 1941) was a Belgian writer who worked mainly in the Walloon language. Most of his works are short; his first book, Les pôves diâles, was written in 1907.
