= Dark Is the Sun =

1979 novel by Philip José Farmer

- Author: Philip José Farmer
- Cover artist: Darrell Sweet
- Language: English
- Genre: Science fiction
- Publisher: Del Rey Books
- Publication date: 1979
- Publication place: United States
- Media type: Print Hardcover, Paperback
- Pages: 405
- ISBN: 0-345-27684-1
- OCLC: 4908137

Dark Is The Sun is a science fiction novel by American writer Philip José Farmer, first published in 1979. It tells the story of the people and creatures left on Earth when the Sun is dead and the universe is heading towards the Big Crunch.

== Plot ==
By the year 15 billion AD, Earth's species have evolved to the point of being super-selected to a purpose. Every form has a sentient representative: animal, plant, and mineral. Pairing of sentient beings, including humans, is controlled by the use of "Soul Eggs" which are given shortly after birth, worn from the neck and when held up to another belonging to a potential mate will sync in pattern and color to approve marriage. Many times through Earth's existence it faced its end, but each time this event occurred, humanity was at a high point in intelligence and was able to rescue Earth from annihilation. When the sun died, they ignited the moon, and later when the moon died, the Earth was moved to safety. But now Earth's death is approaching during a time when humanity's technological levels are at a low point.

The story opens with Deyv, a human, being forced to leave his tribe, the Turtle Tribe, because he cannot find a mate. After leaving his tribe to find a possible mate from a distant tribe, Deyv runs into trouble and ends up meeting the plant-man Sloosh and a feisty woman named Vana. It is revealed that all three have had their Soul Eggs stolen by the fox-like Yawtl, and they begin a mission to track their Soul Eggs down and recover them. Their search brings them to the Jewelled Wasteland, home of the Shemibob, an ancient female being from another star who knows Earth's demise is near and holds the only key to escape.

== Critic reviews ==
An epic adventure by the author of the award-winning Riverworld series. "Farmer is as inventive as ever, and it is a joy to sit down with a book which is this much fun....Highly recommended." "The story proceeds briskly, with fresh inventions on every page, while the characters' original quest grows increasingly complex. The particularly exotic settings and earthlike flora and fauna lend an atmospheric touch."

== Sources ==
- Farmer, Philip José (1979). Dark Is the Sun. Del Rey. ISBN 0-345-28950-1.
