= Mark S. Geston =

American science fiction and fantasy author

Mark Symington Geston (born June 20, 1946) is an American attorney and science fiction writer.

== Biography and writing career ==
Mark S. Geston was born in Atlantic City, New Jersey to John C. Geston and Mary T. (Simmington), both of whom were teachers. His mother taught English and journalism, in addition to writing book reviews. Geston graduated from Abington High School. None of the stories he wrote while growing up in Philadelphia or in high school were published, but when he was 19 and in his second year of college he began writing Lords of the Starship, which was published in 1967. He graduated from Kenyon College in Ohio with a degree in history in 1968, received a J.D. degree from New York University Law School in 1971 and had published three more novels by 1976.

Lords of the Starship takes place on Earth some 3000 years after the collapse of human technological civilization, narrating generations of history inspired by an immense starship construction project. His second novel, Out of the Mouth of the Dragon, takes place in the same world, where some people continue to struggle with its decline and hopelessness. The Day Star further explores decay, time, and aspiration as a boy and a ghost seek a more glorious world. The Siege of Wonder describes the ending of a centuries-long war between magic and technology, in the experience of a man who has entered the magicians' domain as a spy.

In Geston's introduction to The Books of the Wars (Baen Books, 2009), an omnibus edition of Lords of the Starship, Out of the Mouth of the Dragon, and The Siege of Wonder, he described those three books as a cycle, in which The Day Star "does not fit". A 1988 German translation omnibus edition, however, dubbed his first three books as Das Schiff (The Ship) trilogy. His first four books were also translated into French and published across two books in the early 1980s.

His fifth novel, Mirror to the Sky, is set in a near future world reacting emotionally and culturally to works of art brought to Earth by aliens.

Geston is a full-time attorney.

== Published works ==
=== Novels ===
- Lords of the Starship (Ace Books, 1967), 156 pp.
  - First hardcover edition: London, Michael Joseph, 1971, 158 pp. ISBN 0-7181-0893-0
- Out of the Mouth of the Dragon (Ace Books, 1969), 156 pp.
  - First hardcover edition: London, Michael Joseph, 1969, 156 pp. ISBN 0-7181-0952-X
- The Day Star (DAW Books, 1972), 126 pp.
- The Siege of Wonder (Doubleday, 1976), 180 pp. ISBN 0-385-11359-5
  - First paperback edition: DAW Books, 1977, 190 pp. ISBN 0-87997-325-0
- Mirror to the Sky (Morrow/AvoNova, 1992), 234 pp. ISBN 978-0-688-11138-0

=== Short stories ===
- "The Stronghold", short story, Fantastic, July 1974
- "Falconer", short story, Amazing Stories, May 1993
- "The Allies", novelette, The Magazine of Fantasy & Science Fiction, May 1998

=== Compilations ===
- The Books of the Wars, omnibus edition of Lords of the Starship, Out of the Mouth of the Dragon, and The Siege of Wonder (Baen Books, 2009), 646 pp. ISBN 978-1-4165-9152-8
