= J.-H. Rosny aîné =

French writer (1856–1940)

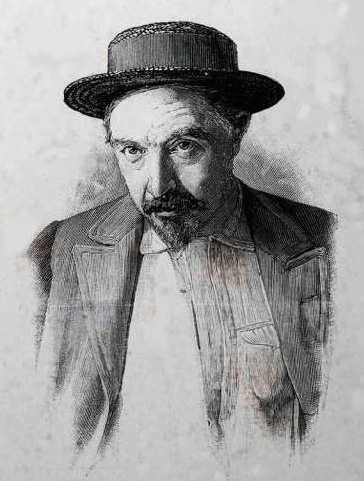
- Born: Joseph Henri Honoré Boex; 17 February 1856; Brussels, Belgium
- Died: 11 February 1940 (aged 83); Paris, France
- Occupation: author
- Known for: science fiction

J.-H. Rosny aîné was the pen name of Joseph Henri Honoré Boex (17 February 1856 – 11 February 1940), a Belgian author considered one of the founding figures of modern science fiction.

Born in Brussels in 1856, he wrote in French in collaboration with his younger brother, Séraphin Justin François Boex, under the joint pen name J.-H. Rosny until 1909. After they ended their collaboration, Joseph Boex continued to write under the name Rosny aîné (Rosny the Elder) while his brother used J.-H. Rosny jeune (Rosny the Younger).

== Overview ==
Rosny aîné was very much like H. G. Wells or Olaf Stapledon in his concepts and his way of dealing with them in his novels. He was the second most important figure after Jules Verne in the history of modern French science fiction.

Because his writing was not translated into English before his death, and his readers did not always understand his science fiction novels, his impact on the early evolution of the genre was limited.

Rosny's first science fiction tale was the short story Les Xipéhuz [The Shapes] (1887). In the story, which takes place a thousand years before Babylonian times, primitive humans encounter inorganic aliens, with whom all forms of communication prove impossible. Men eventually drive away the invaders, but the hero mourns the loss of another life. This was the first time that science fiction abandoned its usual anthropomorphic approach in the description of alien life.

The story "Un Autre Monde" ["Another World"] (1895) establishes that humans share the Earth with the land-bound Moedigen (Dutch for 'brave ones') and the air-borne Vuren ('fires'), two infinitely flat and invisible species who cohabit with us. Only a mutant whose vision is superior to that of ordinary men can see them. In Le Cataclysme [The Cataclysm] (1896), an entire region of France sees the physical laws of nature change, as a result of the arrival of a mysterious electro-magnetic entity from outer space.

Rosny's short novel, La Mort de la Terre [The Death of the Earth] (1910), takes place in the distant future, when the Earth has all but dried out. The last descendants of mankind become aware of the emergence of a new species, the metal-based "Ferromagnetals", fated to replace them.

Another novel, La Force Mystérieuse [The Mysterious Force] (1913), tells of the destruction of a portion of the light spectrum by a mysterious force—possibly aliens from outer space who, for a brief while, share our physical existence. This causes an initial panic, followed by a progressive and potentially deadly cooling of the world.

L'Énigme de Givreuse [The Enigma of Givreuse] (1917) is another novel about a fissiparous human being, divided into two totally similar individuals, each naturally believing himself to be the original.

The novella La Jeune Vampire [The Young Vampire] (1920) was the first time that vampirism was described as a genetic mutation, transmissible by birth.

L'Étonnant Voyage d'Hareton Ironcastle [The Amazing Journey of Hareton Ironcastle] (1922) is a more traditional adventure novel; in it, explorers eventually discover a fragment of an alien world, with its fauna and flora, attached to Earth. The novel was adapted and retold by Philip José Farmer.

Rosny's masterpiece is Les Navigateurs de l'Infini [The Navigators of Infinity] (1925) in which the word astronaut, "astronautique", was coined for the first time. In the story, Rosny's heroes travel to Mars in the Stellarium, a spaceship powered by artificial gravity and made of "argine", an indestructible, transparent material. On Mars, the human explorers come in contact with the gentle, peaceful, six-eyed, three-legged "Tripèdes", a dying race which is slowly being replaced by the "Zoomorphs", alien entities who bear some resemblance to the "Ferromagnetals" of La Mort de la Terre. Later, a young Martian female, capable of bearing children parthenogenetically by merely wishing it, gives birth to a child after falling in love with one of the human explorers. This heralds the rebirth of the Martian race and, with Man's help, the eventual reconquering of their planet.

Rosny also penned five prehistoric novels: Vamireh (1892), Eyrimah (1893), the world-renowned classic La Guerre du Feu better known as The Quest for Fire (1911) which served as the basis for the 1981 film; Le Félin Géant [The Giant Cat] (1918) (sometimes known as Quest of the Dawn Man) and Helgvor du Fleuve Bleu [Helgvor of the Blue River] (1930). The narrative is a combination of various of modern drama with the ability to depict Man's early days.

In 1897, Joseph Boex was awarded the French Légion d'honneur (No. L0266070) and in 1903 was named to the first jury of the Prix Goncourt along with his younger brother. Boex remained involved with the Académie Goncourt and in 1926 became its president. Romain Rolland nominated him for the Nobel Prize in Literature in 1928 and 1933. Joseph Boex died in Paris in 1940.

=== Personal life ===
Boex married Gertrude Emma Holmes when she was 16 and he was 24 in London on 22 November 1880. They had four children together.

== Selected bibliography ==
- Les Xipéhuz (1887) translated by Damon Knight included in 100 Years of Science Fiction, Book One, ISBN 0-330-02982-7; translated by Brian Stableford included in The Navigators of Space, 2010, ISBN 978-1-935558-35-4
- La Sorcière (1887) translated by Brian Stableford included in The Young Vampire, 2010, ISBN 978-1-935558-40-8
- La Légende Sceptique (1889) translated as The Skeptical; Legend included in The Navigators of Space, 2010, q.v.
- Vamireh (1892) translated by Brian Stableford included in Vamireh, 2010, ISBN 978-1-935558-38-5
- Eyrimah (1893) translated by Brian Stableford included in Vamireh, q.v.
- Nymphée (1893) translated by Brian Stableford included in The World of the Variants, 2010, ISBN 978-1-935558-36-1
- L'Indomptee (1894)
- Le Jardin de Mary (1895) translated by Brian Stableford included in The Givreuse Enigma, 2010, ISBN 978-1-935558-39-2
- Un autre monde ["Another World"] (1895) translated as Another World included in The Navigators of Space, 2010, q.v.
- Les Profondeurs de Kyamo [The Depths of Kyamo] (1896) translated by Brian Stableford included in The World of the Variants, 2010, q.v.
- La Contrée Prodigieuse des Cavernes (1896) translated by Brian Stableford included in The World of the Variants, 2010, q.v.
- Le Cataclysme (1896) translated by Brian Stableford included in The Mysterious Force, q.v.
- Nomai (1897) translated by Brian Stableford included in Vamireh, 2010, q.v.
- Le Voyage (1900) translated by Brian Stableford included in The World of the Variants, 2010, q.v.
- La Guerre du Feu (The Quest for Fire) (1909) transl. as The Quest for Fire, 1967
- Le Trésor dans la Neige [The Treasure in the Snow] (1910) translated by Brian Stableford included in The World of the Variants, 2010, q.v.
- La Mort de la Terre [The Death of the Earth] (1910) translated as The Death of the Earth included in The Navigators of Space, 2010, q.v.
- La Force Mystérieuse [The Mysterious Force] (1913) translated by Brian Stableford included in The Mysterious Force, 2010, ISBN 978-1-935558-37-8
- L'Aube du Futur [The Dawn of the Future] (1917)
- L'Énigme de Givreuse [The Enigma of Givreuse] (1917) translated by Brian Stableford included in The Givreuse Enigma, 2010, q.v.
- Le Félin Géant (1918) transl. as The Giant Cat, 1924; a.k.a. Quest of the Dawn Man, 1964, translated by The Honorable Lady Whitehead included in Helgvor of the Blue River (2010), ISBN 978-1-935558-46-0
- La Grande Énigme [The Great Enigma] (1920) translated by Brian Stableford included in The World of the Variants, 2010, q.v.
- La Jeune Vampire (1920) (a.k.a. Le Vampire de Bethnal Green) translated by Brian Stableford included in The Young Vampire, 2010, q.v.
- L'Étonnant Voyage d'Hareton Ironcastle [The Amazing Journey of Hareton Ironcastle] (1922) adapted & retold by Philip Jose Farmer as Ironcastle, 1976; translated by Brian Stableford included in The Mysterious Force, q.v.
- L'Assassin Surnaturel [The Supernatural Assassin] (1923) translated by Brian Stableford included in The Young Vampire, 2010, q.v.
- Les Navigateurs de l'Infini [The Navigators of Infinity] (1925) translated as The Navigators of Space included in The Navigators of Space, 2010, q.v.
- La Terre Noire [The Black Earth] (1925)
- Le Trésor Lointain [The Far-Away Treasure] (1926)
- La Femme Disparue [The Vanished Woman] (1926)
- Les Conquérants du Feu [The Conquerors of Fire] (1929)
- Les Hommes-Sangliers [The Boar-Men] (1929) translated by Brian Stableford included in The World of the Variants, 2010, q.v.
- Helgvor du Fleuve Bleu [Helgvor of the Blue River] (1929), translated by Georges Surdez included in Helgvor of the Blue River (2010), q.v.
- Au Château des Loups Rouges [At the Castle of the Red Wolves] (1929)
- L'Initiation de Diane [Diana's Initiation] (1930)
- Tabubu (1932)
- Les Compagnons de l'Univers [The Companions of the Universe] (1934) translated by Brian Stableford included in The Young Vampire, 2010, q.v.
- La Sauvage Aventure [The Savage Adventure] (1935) translated by Brian Stableford included in The Givreuse Enigma, 2010, q.v.
- Dans le Monde des Variants (1939) translated by Brian Stableford included in The World of the Variants, 2010, q.v.
- Les Astronautes (pub. 1960) translated as The Astronauts included in The Navigators of Space, 2010, q.v.
- ′'L'Amour D'Abord'′ (pub.1924) Copyright by J.Flammarion avec des Bois originaux de Arsene Brivot
- Le Livre Moderne Illustre J. Ferenczi & Fils, Editeurs

== See also ==
- Prix Rosny-Aîné
- Scientific Marvelous
