= J.-H. Rosny =

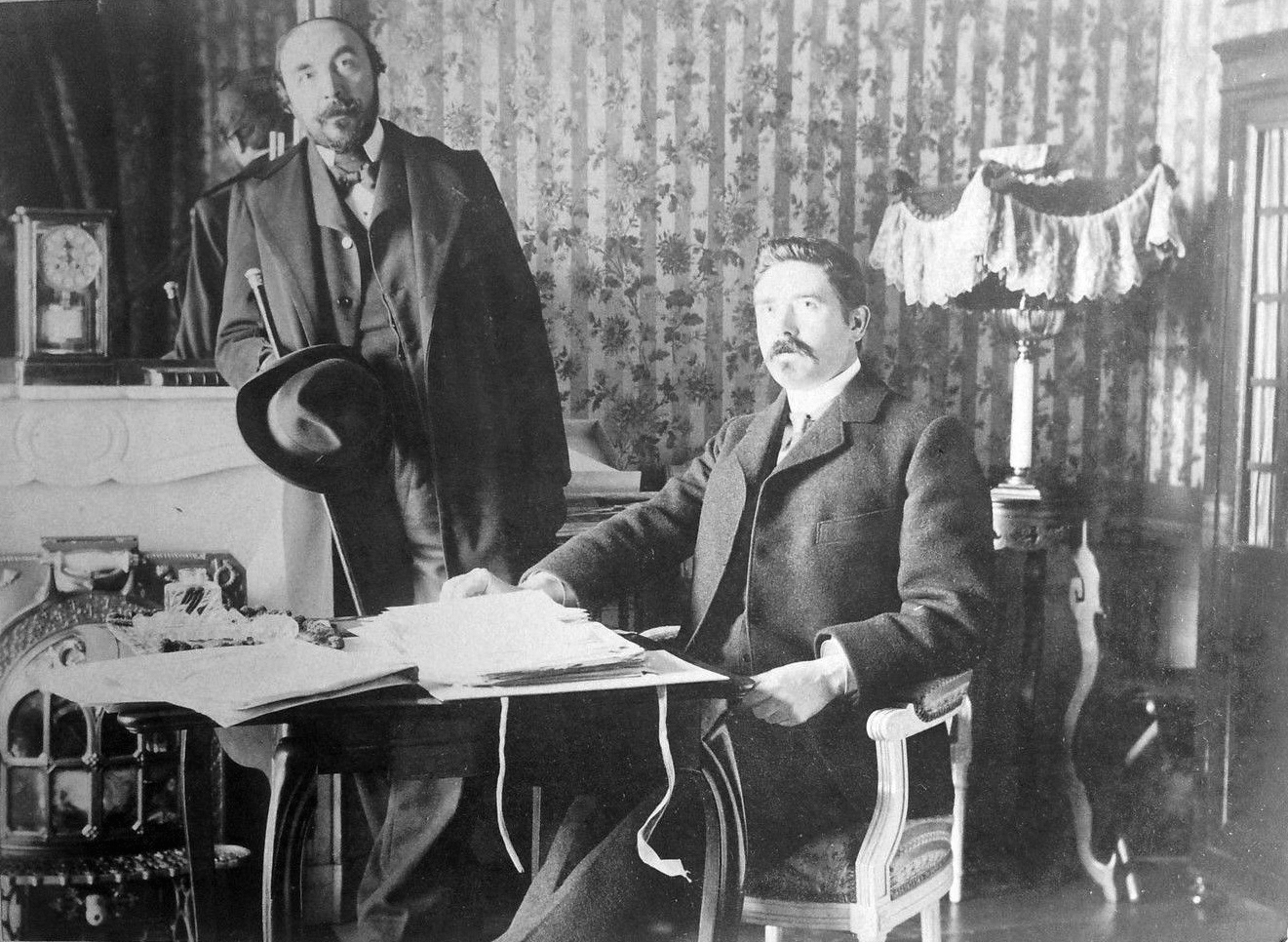
J.-H Rosny

J.-H. Rosny was the pseudonym of the brothers Joseph Henri Honoré Boex (1856–1940) and Séraphin Justin François Boex (1859–1948), both born in Brussels. Together they wrote a series of novels and short stories about natural, prehistoric and fantasy subjects, published between 1886 and 1909, as well as several popular science works. After 1909, the two brothers ended their collaboration, and Joseph Boex took to signing his works as J.-H. Rosny aîné (J. H. Rosny the Elder), while his brother Seraphin used the name J.-H. Rosny jeune (J. H. Rosny the Younger).

In 1887, the brothers were among the writers who entered a formal protest in Le Figaro newspaper against Émile Zola's La Terre. In 1903, the brothers were named to the first jury for the Prix Goncourt, an influential annual French literary award. They are considered to be among the founders of modern science fiction.

Of the two, the elder brother Joseph (J.-H. Rosny aîné) is somewhat better known and many of the joint Rosny works are incorrectly attributed only to the elder brother. Of their books, The Quest for Fire is the best known, especially since it was made into a motion picture of the same name in 1981.

== Books authored jointly by the Boex brothers ==
- Nell Horn de l'Armée du Salut
- Vamireh
- La Guerre du feu (translated as The Quest for Fire)
- Les Xipéhuz
- Amour étrusque
- Les Femmes de Setnê
- L'Étonnant Voyage d'Hareton Ironcastle (translated as Ironcastle by Philip José Farmer)

== See also ==
- J.-H. Rosny aîné
- J.-H. Rosny jeune
