= J.-H. Rosny jeune =

Belgian-French writer (1859–1948)

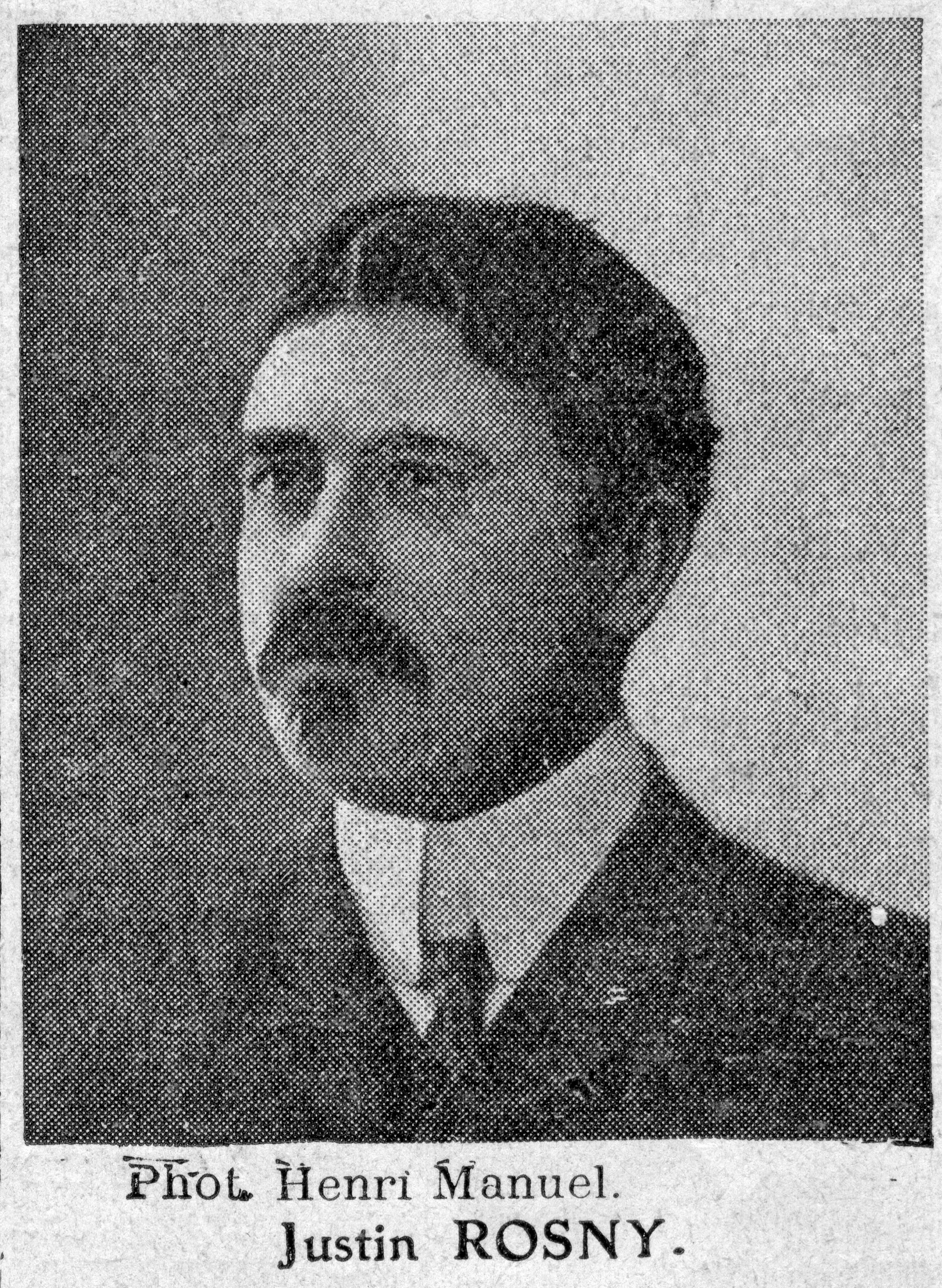
J.-H. Rosny jeune in 1910

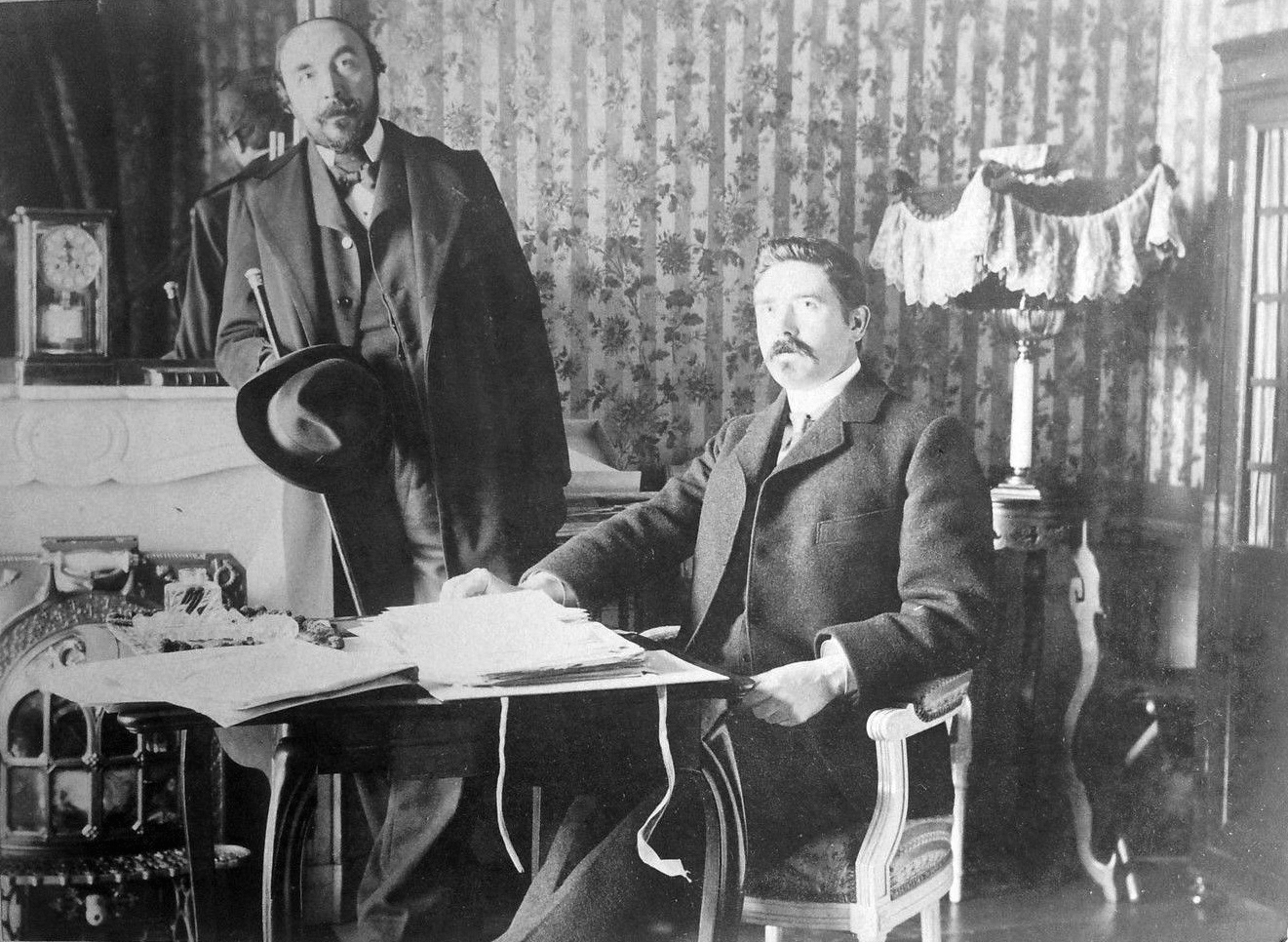
J.-H. Rosny by Dornac

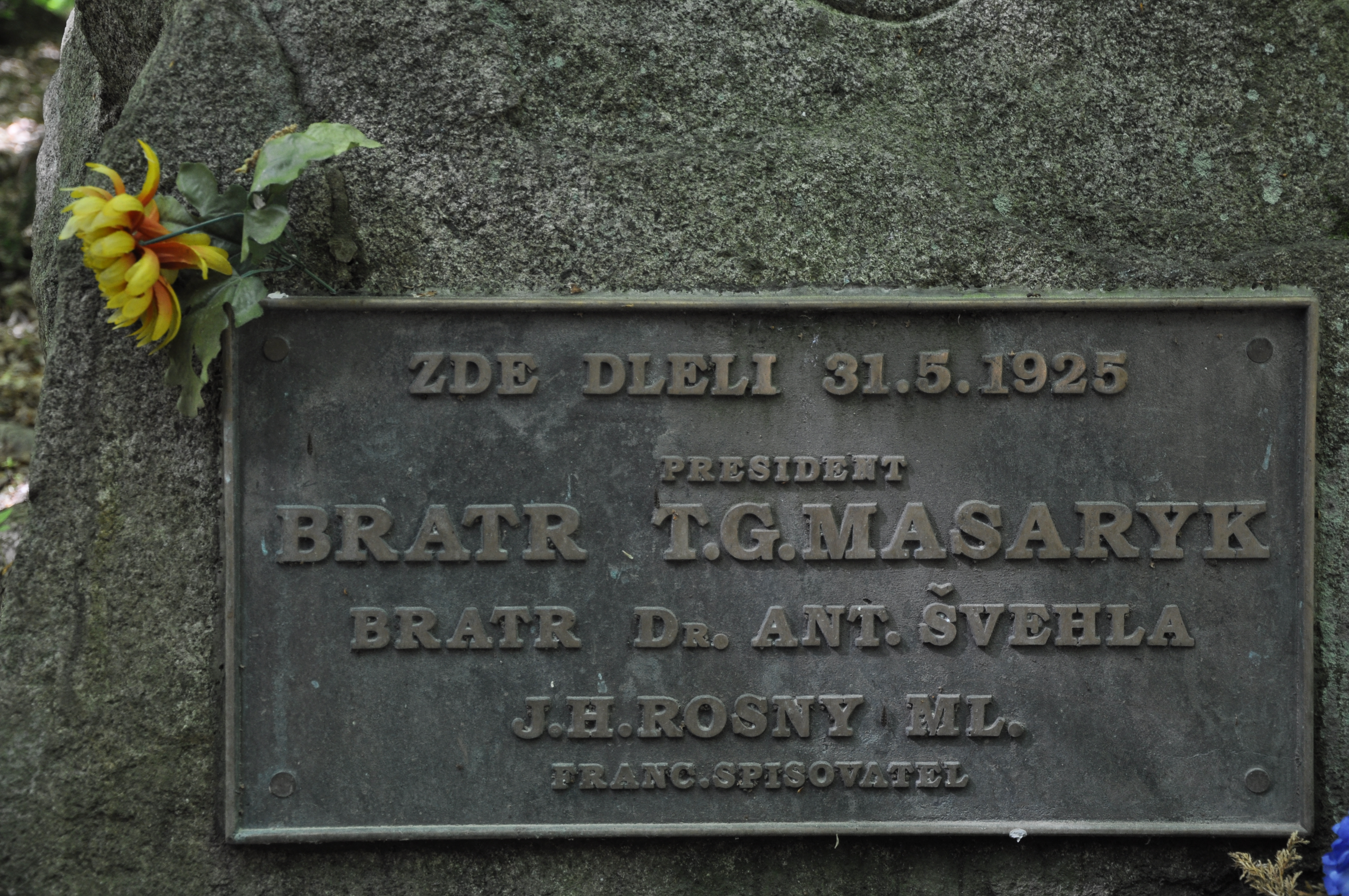

J.-H. Rosny jeune was the pseudonym of Séraphin Justin François Boex (July 21, 1859 – July 21, 1948), a French author of Belgian origin who, along with his better known older brother J.-H. Rosny aîné, is considered one of the founding figures of modern science fiction. Born in Brussels in 1859, until 1909 he wrote together with his older brother Joseph Henri Honoré Boex under the pen name J.-H. Rosny. After they ended their collaboration Joseph Boex continued to write under the name J.-H. Rosny aîné (Rosny Senior) while Séraphin used "Rosny jeune" (Rosny Junior).

In 1903, Séraphin Boex was named to the first jury of the Prix Goncourt along with his brother. He died in 1948 in Ploubazlanec, Côtes-du-Nord, France.

== See also ==
- J.-H. Rosny
- J.-H. Rosny aîné
- French science fiction
