= List of Jupiter novels =

The Jupiter novels are a series of science fiction novels from Tor Books patterned after Robert A. Heinlein's young adult novels. Authors who have written for the series include Charles Sheffield, Jerry Pournelle, and James P. Hogan. The novels follow young characters coming of age in a space-faring setting as they face challenging situations and difficult moral decisions.

The series includes the following books:

- Higher Education (1995) by Charles Sheffield and Jerry Pournelle
- The Billion Dollar Boy (1997) by Charles Sheffield
- Putting Up Roots (1997) by Charles Sheffield
- The Cyborg from Earth (1998) by Charles Sheffield
- Starswarm (1999) by Jerry Pournelle
- Outward Bound (1999) by James P. Hogan
