= Monomolecular wire =

Single strand of atoms or molecules

Monomolecular wire is a type of wire consisting of a single strand of strongly bonded atoms or molecules, such as carbon nanotube.

== In science ==
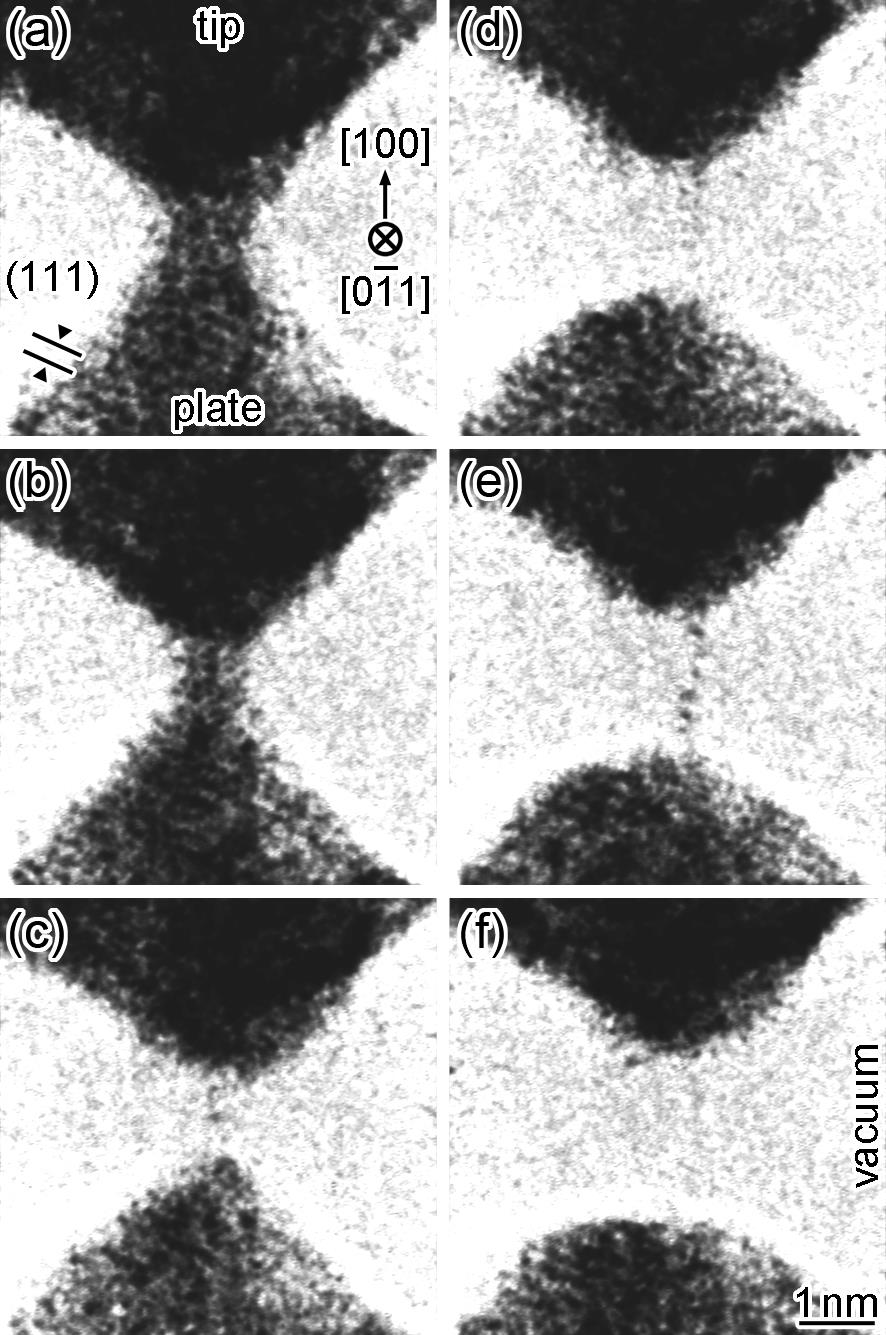
The process of forming a monatomic silver wire.

Organic molecular wires have been proposed for use in optoelectronics.

== In fiction ==
Among the earliest descriptions of a super-strong filament are the film The Man in the White Suit, in which a scientist develops a monofilament cloth fibre that will never wear out, and Theodore Sturgeon's "The Incubi of Parallel X" (Planet Stories, Sep 1951), where a "molecularly condensed fibre" is used as a zipline.

An early example of a material similar to monomolecular wire deliberately used as a weapon and cutting tool is "borazon-tungsten filament" in G. Randall Garrett's "Thin Edge". (Analog, Dec 1963) The main character uses a strand from an asteroid towing-cable to cut jail bars and to booby-trap the door of his room. Many later writers, including John Brunner, Frank Herbert, William Gibson and George R. R. Martin, have also used monomolecular or similar wire as a weapon or tool.

Perhaps the best-known proposed use of monomolecular wire ("hyperfilament") is in the cables of a space elevator. Although there were a few earlier scientific papers suggesting the concept, a fully realized space elevator was first described in 1979 in Arthur Clarke's The Fountains of Paradise and Charles Sheffield's The Web Between the Worlds. The concept has been used in later fiction by Robert A. Heinlein, Iain M. Banks, Larry Niven and others.
