= Linda Zall =

American environmental scientist

Linda Zall in 2023

Linda Zall is an American environmental scientist who previously worked for the Central Intelligence Agency. While at the CIA she was responsible for establishing in 1992 a task force named Measurements of Earth Data for Environmental Analysis, which specialized in using spy satellite images to produce environmental data.

== Biography ==
Zall grew up in North Hornell, New York as the oldest of three children. Her father was the manager of a large dairy. He later became a professor at Cornell University, retiring as Professor Emeritus.

=== Education and career ===
Zall received a PhD in civil and environmental engineering from Cornell University (1976). While at the school, she was mentored by Donald James Belcher.

After graduation, she worked from 1975 to 1984 at the Earth Satellite Corporation and used computers to enhance Landsat images, so that details in the satellites' scanned details could be more easily accessed. In 1985, she moved to the CIA. There, she led teams of scientists and became instrumental in realizing the potential power of spy satellites to keep track of numerous environmental problems and the changes that could be seen from space, an activity that she has called "environmental sleuthing." She retired from the CIA in 2013.

She was awarded the Career Intelligence Medal by CIA Director John Brennan in 2013, and the Intelligence Medal of Merit by CIA Director George Tenet in 2000. In 2023, Zall was elected to the National Academy of Engineering.

=== Personal life ===
Zall married and divorced Charles Sheffield, an English-born mathematician, physicist and science fiction writer. The pair had two daughters Elizabeth and Victoria Sheffield.
