= Convergence (novel) =

1997 novel by Charles Sheffield

- First edition (publ. Baen Books); Cover art by Gary Freeman
- Author: Charles Sheffield
- Genre: Science fiction
- Publisher: Baen Books
- Publication date: March 1, 1997
- ISBN: 978-0-671-87774-3
- Preceded by: Transcendence (1992)
- Followed by: Resurgence (2002)

Convergence (1997) is a science fiction novel in the Heritage Universe series by American writer Charles Sheffield. It is preceded in the series by Transcendence (1992) and followed by Resurgence (2002).

Separately, this title also names a 2022 novel by Craig Alanson which introduces his Convergence book series.

== Plot ==
The book takes place millennia in the future with the same group of explorers introduced in the first two books of the series, Summertide and Divergence. After millions of years of apparent inaction, the Builder artifacts are changing quickly. After exploring several new artifacts, rediscovering the existence of a race thought to be dead for millennia, and finding that race's home planet in the midst of an enormous artifact, the adventures of this eclectic team become even stranger.

In this book the characters explore several old artifacts to find that they have changed. These changes all seemed to be linked to a seemingly new artifact, which may affect the future of the entire Orion Arm of the galaxy.
