= Transvergence =

1999 novel by Charles Sheffield

- First edition cover (Baen Books); art by Drew Blair
- Author: Charles Sheffield
- Language: English
- Publication date: 1999
- ISBN: 0-671-57837-5

Transvergence (1999) is a compilation book of science fiction novels by American writer Charles Sheffield. Sometimes listed as a 6th book of the Heritage Universe series of novels, Transvergence is actually a compilation of book 3, Transcendence (published in 1992) and book 4, Convergence (published in 1997). The title, Transvergence is a mashup of those novels' titles.
