= Captains Courageous =

1897 adventure novel by Rudyard Kipling

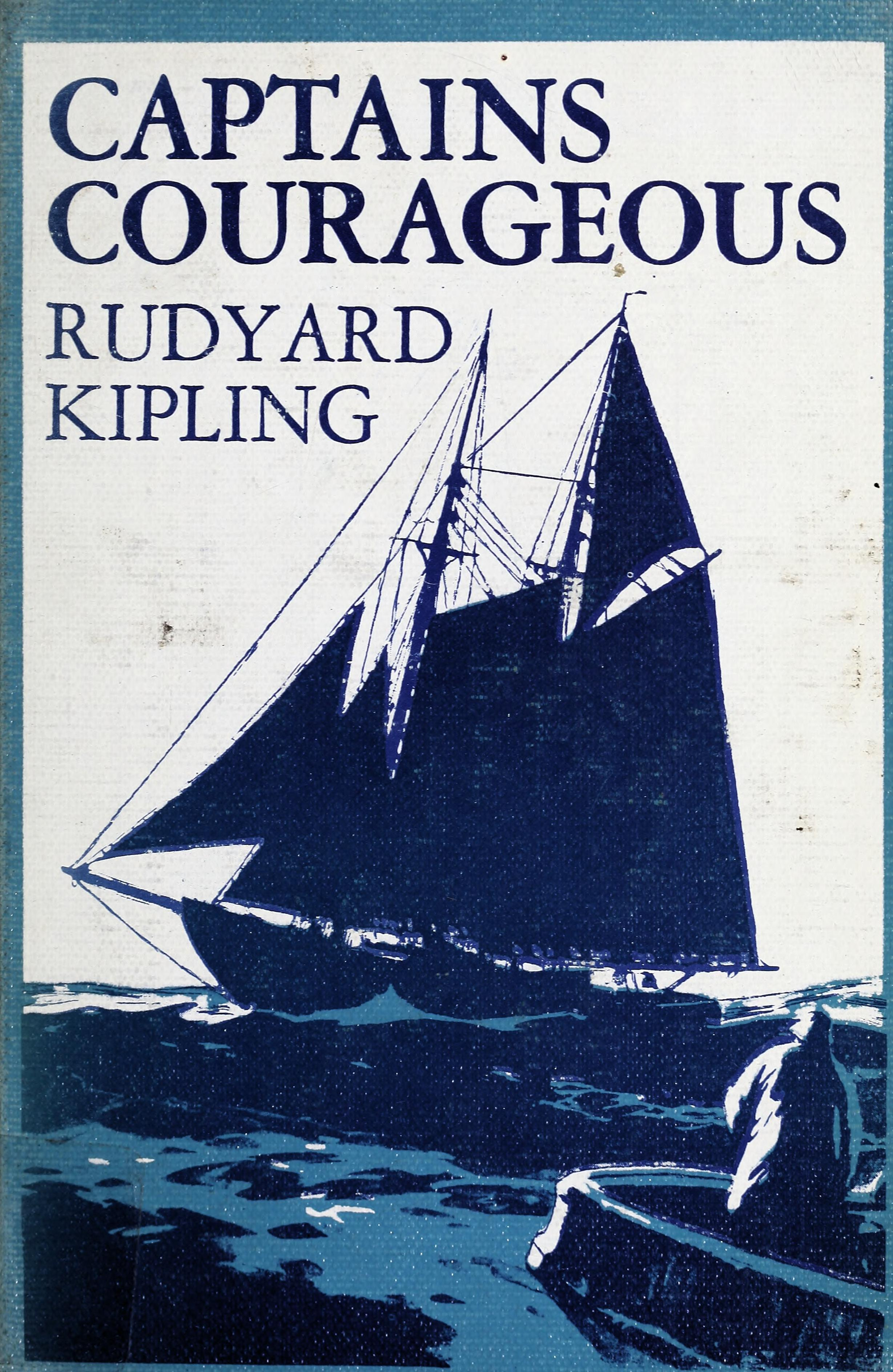
- Cover of the first American edition
- Author: Rudyard Kipling
- Original title: "Captains Courageous": A Story of the Grand Banks
- Illustrator: Isaac Walton Taber
- Language: English
- Genre: Adventure, nautical, juvenile
- Set in: Grand Banks, Gloucester, Gilded Age
- Published: 1897
- Publisher: Doubleday, Doran (US), Macmillan and Co. (UK)
- Publication place: United States
- Media type: Print (hardcover)
- Pages: 245 (hardcover, first edition)
- ISBN: 0-89577-601-4
- OCLC: 1010271996
- Dewey Decimal: 823.8
- LC Class: PR4854
- Text: Captains Courageous at Wikisource

Captains Courageous: A Story of the Grand Banks is an 1897 novel by Rudyard Kipling that follows the adventures of fifteen-year-old Harvey Cheyne Jr., the spoiled son of a railroad tycoon, after he is saved from drowning by an American fishing schooner in the North Atlantic and is made to earn his keep as a member of the crew.

The novel originally appeared as a serialisation in McClure's, beginning with the November 1896 edition with the last instalment appearing in May 1897. In that year, it was published in its entirety as a novel, first in the United States by Doubleday, and a month later in the United Kingdom by Macmillan. It is Kipling's only novel set entirely in North America. In 1900, Teddy Roosevelt extolled the book in his essay "What We Can Expect of the American Boy", praising Kipling for describing "in the liveliest way just what a boy should be and do".

The book's title comes from the ballad "Mary Ambree", which starts, "Then captains courageous, whom death could not daunt". Kipling had previously used the same title for an article on businessmen as the new adventurers, published in The Times on 23 November 1892.

== Plot ==
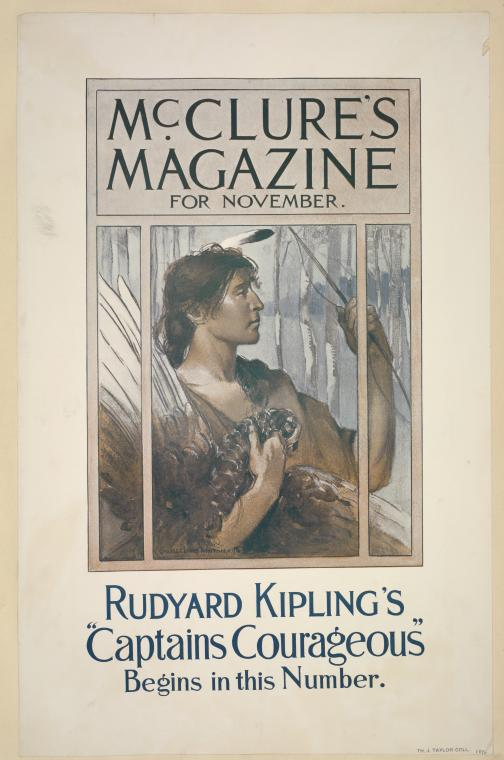
Cover of the November 1896 edition of McClure's, which began the serialisation of the novel

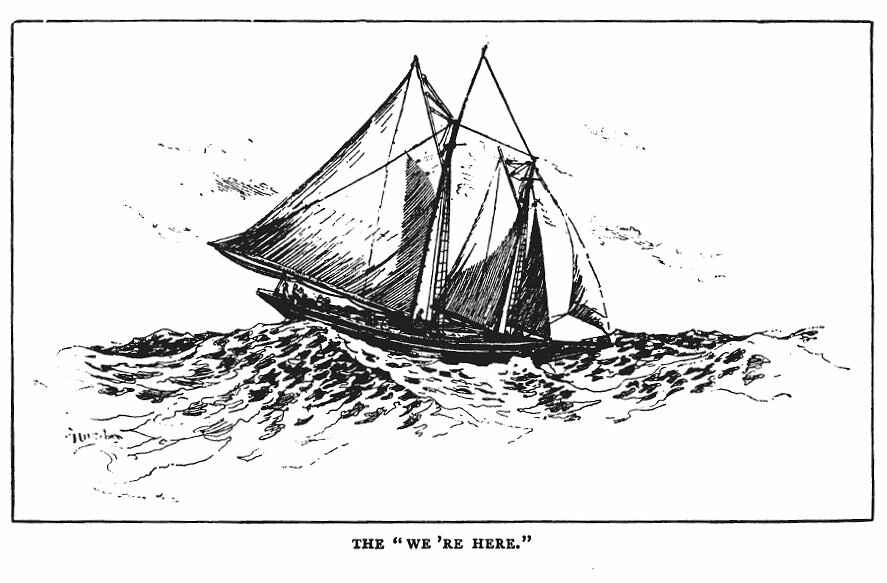
The fishing schooner We're Here

Protagonist Harvey Cheyne Jr. is the spoiled son of a wealthy California railroad magnate. Washed overboard from a transatlantic steamship and rescued by the crew of the fishing schooner We're Here, off the Grand Banks of Newfoundland, Harvey can neither persuade them to take him quickly to port, nor convince them of his wealth. Harvey accuses the captain, Disko Troop, of stealing his wallet (which is revealed to be on the deck from which Harvey fell). Troop then beats Harvey and makes it clear that he can either starve or work off the debt he owes to the crew by serving as a cabin boy.

Through a series of trials and adventures, Harvey, with the help of the captain's son, Dan, becomes acclimated to the fishing lifestyle, and even skillful, such as becoming responsible for the ship's accounts of its catch. Great stories of the cod fishery with references to New England whaling and 19th-century steam and sailing are intertwined with the We're Here's adventures during a season at sea. Eventually, the We're Here returns to port and Harvey wires his parents, who immediately hasten to Boston, Massachusetts, and thence to the fishing town of Gloucester to recover him. The Cheynes are amazed by their son's newfound maturity, and reward the Portuguese seaman Manuel, who initially rescued Harvey. Harvey's father hires Dan to work on his prestigious tea clipper fleet, and Harvey goes to Stanford to prepare for taking over his father's shipping lines.

== Notes ==
The book was written during Kipling's time living in Brattleboro, Vermont. Kipling recalled in his autobiography:

Now our Dr. [James] Conland had served in [the Gloucester] fleet when he was young. One thing leading to another, as happens in this world, I embarked on a little book which was called Captains Courageous. My part was the writing; his the details. This book took us (he rejoicing to escape from the dread respectability of our little town) to the shore-front, and the old T-wharf of Boston Harbour, and to queer meals in sailors' eating-houses, where he renewed his youth among ex-shipmates or their kin. We assisted hospitable tug-masters to help haul three- and four-stick schooners of Pocahontas coal all round the harbour; we boarded every craft that looked as if she might be useful, and we delighted ourselves to the limit of delight. ... Old tales, too, he dug up, and the lists of dead and gone schooners whom he had loved, and I revelled in profligate abundance of detail—not necessarily for publication but for the joy of it. ...I wanted to see if I could catch and hold something of a rather beautiful localised American atmosphere that was already beginning to fade. Thanks to Conland I came near this.

Kipling also recalled:

When, at the end of my tale, I desired that some of my characters should pass from San Francisco to New York in record time, and wrote to a railway magnate of my acquaintance asking what he himself would do, that most excellent man sent a fully worked-out time-table, with watering halts, changes of engine, mileage, track conditions and climates, so that a corpse could not have gone wrong in the schedule.

The resulting account, in Chapter 9, of the Cheynes' journey from San Diego to Boston, is a classic of railway literature. The couple travel in the Cheynes' private rail car, the "Constance", and are taken from San Diego to Chicago as a special train, hauled by sixteen locomotives in succession. It takes precedence over 177 other trains. "Two and one-half minutes would be allowed for changing engines; three for watering and two for coaling". The "Constance" is attached to the scheduled express "New York Limited" to Buffalo, New York, and transferred to the New York Central for the trip across the state to Albany. Switched to the Boston and Albany Railroad, the Cheynes complete the trip to Boston in their private car, with the entire cross-country run taking 87 hours 35 minutes.

Kipling also recalled:

My characters arrived triumphantly; and, then, a real live railway magnate was so moved after reading the book that he called out his engines and called out his men, hitched up his own private car, and set himself to beat my time on paper over the identical route, and succeeded.

Disko Troop claims to receive his given name for his birth on board his father's ship near Disko Island on the west coast of Greenland. His crewman, "Long Jack", once calls him "Discobolus".

A claim that Kipling used the United States Fish Commission fisheries research ship USFC Grampus as the model for We′re Here is unproven.

== Film, TV, theatrical, or other adaptations ==
Captains Courageous has been adapted for film three times:

- In 1937 as Captains Courageous, produced by Louis D. Lighton, directed by Victor Fleming and starring Spencer Tracy, Freddie Bartholomew, Lionel Barrymore, Melvyn Douglas, Mickey Rooney and John Carradine. Tracy won the Academy Award for Best Actor for his work in this film.
- In 1977 for television, directed by Harvey Hart and starring Karl Malden, Jonathan Kahn, Ricardo Montalbán, Fritz Weaver, Fred Gwynne and Neville Brand.
- In 1996 for television, directed by Michael Anderson and starring Robert Urich, Kenny Vadas, Kaj-Erik Eriksen, Sandra Nelson and Colin Cunningham.

Musical theatre:

- Captains Courageous, The Musical was a 1999 Off Broadway production at the Manhattan Theatre Club.
- Episode 89 of The Triplets is based on Captains Courageous and follows the plot very closely.

Other adaptations:

- The Billion Dollar Boy by Charles Sheffield is a retelling of Captains Courageous in a futuristic science fiction setting.
- Cabin Boy, a movie starring Chris Elliott, is a loose adaptation.

== In popular culture ==
- Commentator David Lloyd frequently referred to Kevin Pietersen as "Captain Courageous" during his period as captain of the England cricket team.
- In the movie Captain Ron (1992), Martin Short's character derisively refers to the leader as "Captains Courageous".
- "Captains Outrageous" is the title of a 1974 Junior Woodchucks comic book written by Carl Barks, a 1979 episode of the American television series M*A*S*H, and a 2001 crime/suspense novel by Joe R. Lansdale.
- "Captains Courageous" is a track on the Levellers album Mouth to Mouth.
