= Proteus in the Underworld =

1995 novel by Charles Sheffield

- Author: Charles Sheffield
- Genre: Science fiction
- Publisher: Baen
- Publication date: May 1995

Proteus in the Underworld (1995) is a science fiction novel by Charles Sheffield. The book is set in the same universe as his previous works Proteus Unbound (1989) and Sight of Proteus (1978).

== Technological background ==
The most immediately apparent new technology is that of Form Change. Purposive Form Change is an extremely advanced and refined form of biofeedback, in which a Form Change Tank assists a human user in subtle or extreme modifications to his or her physiology and appearance. The most widespread use of Form Change is in treating congenital defects and injuries. Limbs may be regrown, eyesight corrected, chemical imbalances adjusted, and the onset of senility delayed for decades.

Form Change also provides an outlet for the aspirations of fanatics and niche social groups. Multiple colonies have been established on asteroids and cometary debris throughout the Solar System, in which isolated groups implement quixotic and highly questionable form changes to bring about their own personal utopias. One such group magnifies the scale of their body so as to allow for greater brain development in the womb. Another group has established a surprisingly stable fiefdom in which physical appearance is a direct indicator of societal status. Others attempt bizarre cyborg enhancements, stabilised by regular form change tank visitations. One of the most extreme forms is reminiscent of a kangaroo with highly adapted circulatory and respiratory systems, allowing survival on the surface of Mars.

Form Change has, in fact, become so well accepted that the ability to form change is now the very definition of humanity. Experimentation on animals has shown that only humans have the ability to undergo Purposive Form Change. Eventually, this fact becomes so ingrained into society that infants who cannot respond to Form Change treatments are euthanised shortly after birth. This Humanity Test has been in effect for nearly two hundred years.

Wormholes also play a part in this universe. Although extremely expensive and requiring a large amount of power to operate, wormholes allow instantaneous communication across the Solar System, as well as even more expensive instantaneous travel. Given the cost of wormholes, they are used almost exclusively by the government and big business; ordinary citizens travel by intrasolar ships. In the context of this story, wormholes do not greatly affect the plot, and mainly serve to facilitate interaction between the main characters.

== Plot summary ==
Sondra Wolf Dearborn is a junior operative in the Office of Form Control. Her job is to monitor questionable and illicit form change techniques, enforce the Humanity Test, and prosecute illegal mods. She is a recent addition to the force, arriving just three years after the retirement of the legendary Bey Wolf, one of the greatest form change experts alive. She is assigned to a strange case by her superior Denzel Morone: several instances in which the Humanity Test has been successfully applied, but the "infants," if they could be called that, are feral monsters. Knowing that there is no way the specimens could have (or should have) passed the test, and also aware of her own limitations and inexperience, Sondra seeks advice from Bey Wolf, her distant relative.

Bey Wolf resides on Wolf Island, a private resort he chose for the name and the isolation it provides. Having retired, he is pursuing his own research in animal Form Change, a fairly taboo subject. Sondra Wolf Dearborn arrives unannounced and uninvited, and he berates her before sending her off, telling her to visit the distant colony and inspect the Humanity Test equipment herself for possible flaws. He is ready to put her out of his mind when he receives another unwelcome visit, this time from Trudy Melford, president of BEC: Biological Equipment Corporation, the manufacturer of all Form Change tanks for the last 150 years. Trudy Melford is one of the richest and most powerful people alive, and a personal visit to a remote island is evidence of great urgency and need on her part. Bey Wolf, annoyed by Trudy's interruption, is nonetheless intrigued by her offer of a position at BEC to work on revolutionary new forms. However, his natural cynicism and detective's instincts tell him that the two visits in such a short time are connected somehow.

Sondra Wolf Dearborn takes Bey Wolf's advice, after some initial stonewalling by her superior Denzel Morone, and heads for the outsystem. Generally regarded by Earth as a sparsely populated backwater, the Cloudlanders (referring to the Oort cloud) have an inverse view of themselves as the pinnacle of human civilisation, with Earth and the inner system a spent and tired cesspool of humanity. Sondra enlists the help of Bey Wolf's friend Aybee, a physicist and administrative genius, to further investigate the malfunctions and charter a flight to the Fugate colony, site of the first Humanity Test failure.

Upon arriving at Fugate, Sondra is unnerved to find that Fugates are tens of meters tall, a form designed to allow cerebral growth unrestricted by the constraints of the mother's pelvis. The Fugates guide Sondra to the supposedly flawed equipment, then leave her alone at her request. Sondra performs every test she can imagine on the suspect Form Change tank, but is unable to find any software problems. She also rules out hardware flaws after inspecting the unbroken BEC seals. Having concluded her investigation, she suddenly realises that she has been locked in the tank chamber and the atmosphere is becoming dangerously thin and cold. With no alternative, she sets up an emergency form change regimen in one of the tanks to put her in a cold-tolerant coma, and reluctantly steps inside.

Meanwhile, Trudy Melford successfully lures Bey Wolf to Mars, the new headquarters of BEC. Bey is astonished to find that the entire Melford Castle (her family's personal estate) has been moved to Mars brick by brick, ostensibly for tax purposes. Trudy, acting as the gracious host, treats him to a lavish dinner and all but promises her body to him, if he will only accept a position at BEC. She even opens up her database to Wolf, giving him full access to all of BEC's past, present, and future undertakings. Fascinated, Bey spends hours browsing through theoretical form change research efforts currently in progress. This experience heightens his suspicions; the BEC engineers are ingenious, what problem could possibly be so important and so intractable that it warrants Trudy Melford's personal recruitment efforts towards him?

Bey Wolf is beginning to realise that a very complex mystery is unfolding around him, and he has a hunch that the Humanity Test false positives are involved. He contacts Aybee and asks the Cloudlander to keep an eye on Sondra Dearborn, and even places a call to Roger Capman, another brilliant form change expert who has adopted a Logian Form: a supersentient methane breathing human form. Roger Capman, along with all other Logians, lives in floating cities deep in the atmosphere of Saturn. Logians have a stated policy of noninterference in human affairs, although Roger Capman maintains a special relationship with Bey. Roger expresses great interest in the situation but offers little information.

Bey investigates further, and makes contact with the Mars Foundation, an organisation founded by the original Mars colonists and continued by their descendants. Their goals are lofty: the terraforming of Mars, and their resources are truly enormous. For the past hundred years they have been shuttling comets to Mars and smashing them into the equator, gradually increasing the humidity and thickening the atmosphere. Their hope is that humans will eventually be able to walk on the surface of Mars without a suit. They think Melford has recruited Bey Wolf to help her perfect the new "surface forms" that have been spotted recently on Mars; humans who vaguely resemble kangaroos, and are already able to live unassisted on the Martian surface. The Mars Foundation's request is simple: snub BEC, refuse the contract, and they would match Trudy's offer.

Bey had already discussed the surface forms with Trudy, and she had admitted that BEC was not behind the design, but she was interested in the possibilities (and profit) they presented. Assuming Trudy was telling the truth, there was a third party behind these new forms. Bey takes his leave and decides to venture out onto the surface, where he meets Georgia Kruskal, the genius behind the new Martian form. Bey recognises in her intellect and ingenuity a kindred spirit, and he immediately asks Georgia for permission to contribute to her project.

Aybee arrives at Fugate colony to discover Sandra in the form change tank. He and a puzzled Fugate revive her, and she claims to have survived a murder attempt. Her attempts to explain this to her supervisor back home fall on deaf ears, and he orders her back to Earth. Aybee encourages Sondra to make a stopover at Samarkand, because he has found a curious anomaly in the system traffic while looking for clues as to the identity of Sondra's attempted murderer: Trudy Melford's personal yacht recently paid a visit to Samarkand, a reclusive asteroid colony which has outlawed all form change. Why would the president of BEC visit a colony vehemently opposed to form change technology?

Back on Mars, Bey is also the target of a murder attempt. A helical escalator is sabotaged and he falls thirteen meters, breaking a leg and an arm. He barely manages to summon help before passing out, and is brought back to Melford Castle. He persuades Trudy to send him back to his home on Wolf Island, where he programs a dangerously rapid regeneration procedure into his customised Form Change Tanks; in just under a week, he'll be out and walking again. He's now convinced a major conspiracy is underway, and all signs point to Trudy Melford. Sondra is of the same mind, and she manages to arrange a meeting with Trudy herself.

Sondra and Bey confront Trudy, and they learn that she bore a child several years ago which failed the humanity test. Unable to relinquish her son to the organ banks, Trudy instituted a massive coverup and faked his death during a boating accident. She moved her corporation to Mars, not for the tax breaks, but to provide a safe and isolated haven for her illegal son. The visits to Samarkand were a diversionary tactic; if anyone got too close and suspected the truth, they would waste their efforts in a futile search of Samarkand's population. Trudy's ultimate goal was to undermine the legitimacy of the Humanity Test itself, by engineering defects into BEC equipment so that obvious non-humans would occasionally score a false positive. The murder attempts on Sondra and Bey were coordinated by her misguided underlings, attempting to win favour.

Bey promises Trudy that he will reveal to the whole system that the Humanity Test is flawed. In fact, both he and Roger Capman nearly failed the test when they were infants. The Test apparently rejects those with a certain psychological profile. For generations, the human race has been culling what could have been some of its most brilliant minds!

The revelation of Trudy's motives leaves another mystery unsolved: the enormous financial resources of the Mars Foundation. It is at this point that Bey Wolf confronts Roger Capman, who admits that the Logians have been interfering with human affairs after all. They have financed the whole terraforming operation on Mars to keep the human race from fragmenting and undergoing speciation. They foresee a time not far in the future when humans evolve into separate subspecies through isolation of populations. Bey realises that this same fear has been at the back of his mind for years, but he had been unable to articulate it. Roger Capman makes another attempt to convince Bey Wolf to join him in Logian Form, but Bey Wolf realises that he has many more years of life left to him as a human, and he intends to enjoy them and continue to contribute to human society.

== Reception ==
Richard Parks of Science Fiction Age wrote: "It may be a stereotype that readers of hard SF like good ideas better than good characters, but there's enough of both here for balance." Parks stated that Sheffield "manages to include a few interestingly oddball characters along the way" and is "at his very best when depicting scientists happily working within their chosen specialties". However, he also criticised Sheffield's handling of the point of view, opining that it "tended to jar."

== See also ==
- The Nimrod Hunt (1986, revised as The Mind Pool, 1993)
