= The Ganymede Club =

1995 novel by Charles Sheffield

- First edition cover Cover art by John Berkey
- Author: Charles Sheffield
- Genre: Science fiction; Mystery; Thriller
- Publisher: Tor Books
- Publication date: December 1, 1995
- Pages: 352
- ISBN: 0-312-85662-8

The Ganymede Club is a 1995 science fiction novel by American writer Charles Sheffield. A mystery and a thriller, the story unravels in the same universe that Sheffield imagined in Cold as Ice. Shortly after humanity begins colonisation of the Solar System, a trade war sets off vicious civil war that kills billions. The book received favorable reviews from Library Journal and Kirkus Reviews, as well as in the science-fiction press. It was ranked #14 in SF novels in the 1996 Locus awards. The novel has been translated into Italian and was published as Memoria impossibile in 1998 in the magazine Urania. In 2009 Bastei Lübbe published a German language edition in Germany.

== Setting ==
Story elements take place prior to and after the fictional Great War between Earth and the Belt colonies - a war that wipes out half of humanity. The introduction to the novel gives the following timeline of major events:

- 2012 - First crewed mission to Mars.
- 2020 - First Mars colony. Smart probes leave on Solar System Grand Tour.
- 2029 - First Belt mines and colonies.
- 2030 - Von Neumanns released on Ganymede.
- 2032 - First human exploration of the Saturn system.
- 2038 - Solar studies research station on Mercury.
- 2040 - Second human exploration of Saturn system; smart probes leave for moons of Uranus.
- 2044 - Ceres and Pallas colonies achieve self-sufficiency.
- 2046 - Venus terraforming effort aborted; first Venus station.
- 2048 - Third Saturn exploration team; Von Neumanns released on Titan.
- 2050 - Rapid development of Jovian moons Ganymede and Callisto, research station on Europa.
- 2053 - Belt declares independence. Major frictions between Earth and former Belt colonies.
- 2054 - Disappearance of fourth Saturn exploration team.
- 2055 - Earth population tops ten billion, Mars population tops ten million.
- 2057 - Research station proposed for Oberon.
- 2060 - Armageddon Defense Line installed on Luna. Luna population reaches seven million.
- 2061 - Fifth Saturn exploration team.
- 2062 - Belt population tops one hundred million. Colonies on Ceres, Pallas, Vesta, Juno, Hidalgo, and twenty-seven smaller planetoids.
- 2066 - Sixth Saturn exploration team; Ganymede/Callisto population reaches eighty million.
- 2067 - The Great War.

Humans have colonized the Solar System with the help of self-replicating machines called Von Neumanns. The story begins at the time of the early exploration of Saturn's moons (specifically Helene, in 2032) but the novel's main mystery unfolds on Ganymede after the Great War.

The main protagonist, Lola Belman, a futuristic psychiatrist, uses advanced sensors and psychoactive drugs to study patients. She and her brother Spook narrowly escaped the apocalypse on Earth as children and settled on Ganymede. Spook is mathematically savant and an aspiring player on the Puzzle Network. There he meets Bat, an obese teenage genius, an older version of whom appears as a main character in Cold as Ice. When one of Lola's patients complains of memories that couldn't possibly have happened to him, the three characters accidentally uncover a bizarre conspiracy.
