= Timeline of carbon nanotubes =

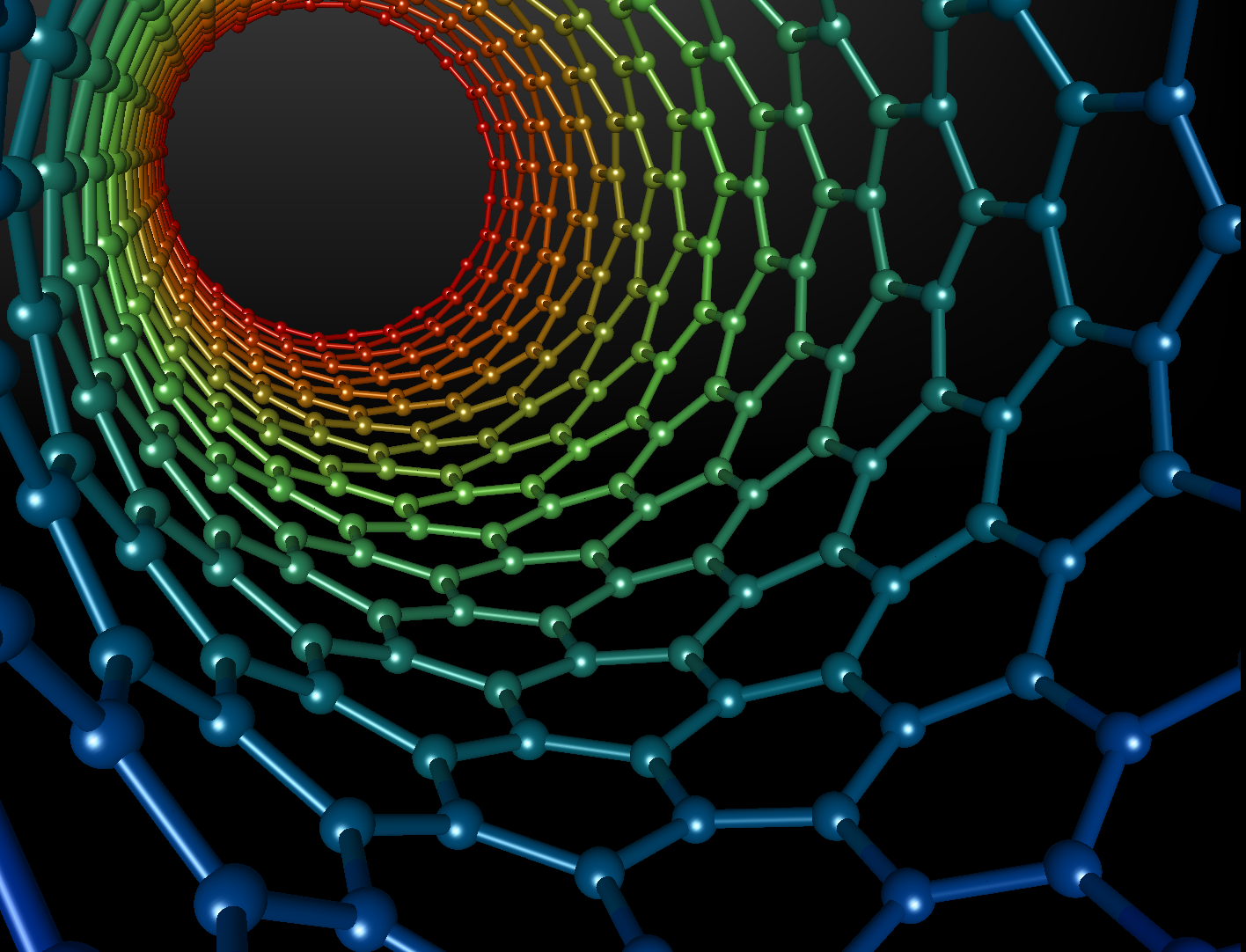
Inside a carbon nanotube

== 1950s ==
- 1952 – Radushkevich and Lukyanovich publish a paper in the Soviet Journal of Physical Chemistry showing hollow graphitic carbon fibers that are 50 nanometers in diameter.
- 1955 – Hofer, Sterling and McCarney observe a growth of tubular carbon filaments, of 10–200 nm in diameter.
- 1958 – Hillert and Lange observe a growth of nanoscale tubular carbon filaments from n-heptane decomposition on iron at about 1000 °C.

== 1960s ==
- Roger Bacon grows "graphite wiskers" in an arc-discharge apparatus and use electron microscopy to show that the structure consist of rolled up graphene sheets in concentric cylinders.
- Bollmann and Spreadborough discuss friction properties of carbon due to rolling sheets of graphene in Nature. Electron microscope picture clearly shows a Multi-walled carbon nanotube, MWCNT.

== 1970s ==
- 1971 – M.L. Lieberman reports growth of three different graphitic like filaments; tubular, twisted, and balloon like. TEM images and diffraction data shows that the hollow tubes are multi-walled carbon nanotubes (MWCNT).
- 1976 – A. Oberlin, Morinobu Endo, and T. Koyama reported CVD (Chemical Vapor Deposition) growth of nanometer-scale carbon fibers, and they also reported the discovery of carbon nanofibers, including that some were shaped as hollow tubes.
- 1979 – Arthur C. Clarke's science fiction novel The Fountains of Paradise popularizes the idea of a space elevator using "a continuous pseudo-one dimensional diamond crystal".

== 1980s ==
- 1982 – The continuous or floating-catalyst process was patented by Japanese researchers T. Koyama and Morinobu Endo.
- 1985 – Fullerenes discovered.
- 1987 – Howard G. Tennent of Hyperion Catalysis issued a U.S. patent for graphitic, hollow core "fibrils".

== 1990s ==
- 1991
  - Nanotubes synthesized hollow carbon molecules and determined their crystal structure for the first time in the soot of arc discharge at NEC, by Japanese researcher Sumio Iijima.
  - August — Nanotubes discovered in CVD by Al Harrington and Tom Maganas of Maganas Industries, leading to development of a method to synthesize monomolecular thin film nanotube coatings.
- 1992 – First theoretical predictions of the electronic properties of single-walled carbon nanotubes by groups at Naval Research Laboratory, USA; Massachusetts Institute of Technology; and NEC Corporation.
- 1993 – Groups led by Donald S. Bethune at IBM and Sumio Iijima at NEC independently discover single-wall carbon nanotubes and methods to produce them using transition-metal catalysts.
- 1995 – Swiss researchers are the first to demonstrate the electron emission properties of carbon nanotubes. German inventors Till Keesmann and Hubert Grosse-Wilde predicted this property of carbon nanotubes earlier in the year in their patent application.
- 1997
  - First carbon nanotube single-electron transistors (operating at low temperature) are demonstrated by groups at Delft University and UC Berkeley.
  - The first suggestion of using carbon nanotubes as optical antennas is made in the patent application of inventor Robert Crowley filed in January 1997.
- 1998 – First carbon nanotube field-effect transistors are demonstrated by groups at Delft University and IBM.

== 2000s ==
- 2000 – First demonstration proving that bending carbon nanotubes changes their resistance
- 2001 April — First report on a technique for separating semiconducting and metallic nanotubes.
- 2002 January — Multi-walled nanotubes demonstrated to be fastest known oscillators (> 50 GHz).
- 2003 September — NEC announced stable fabrication technology of carbon nanotube transistors.
- 2004 March — Nature published a photo of an individual 4 cm long single-wall nanotube (SWNT).
- 2005
  - May — A prototype high-definition 10-centimetre flat screen made using nanotubes was exhibited.
  - August — University of California finds Y-shaped nanotubes to be ready-made transistors.
  - August — General Electric announced the development of an ideal carbon nanotube diode that operates at the "theoretical limit" (the best possible performance). A photovoltaic effect was also observed in the nanotube diode device that could lead to breakthroughs in solar cells, making them more efficient and thus more economically viable.
  - August — Nanotube sheet synthesised with dimensions 5 × 100 cm.

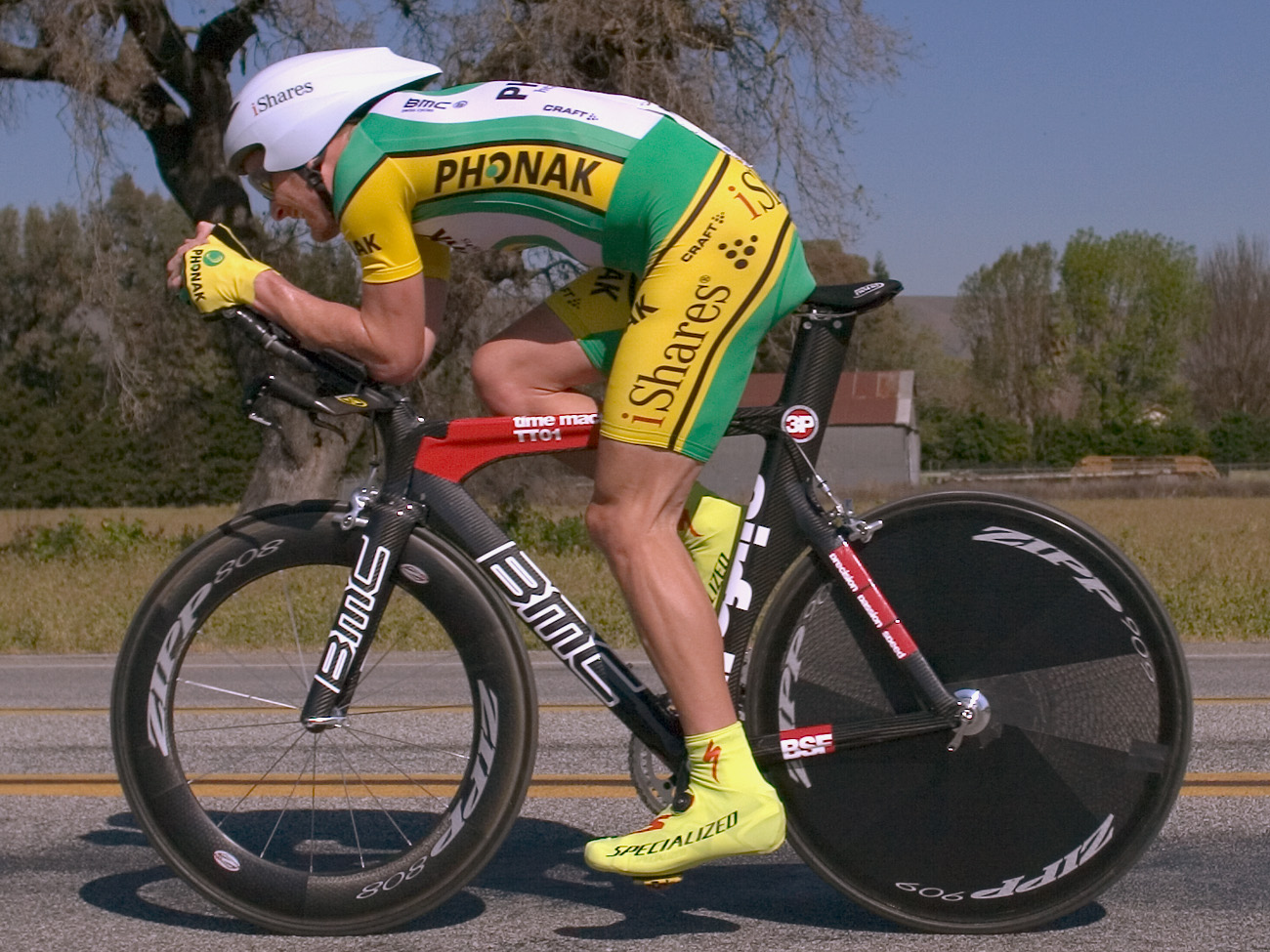
The winning nanotube-enhanced bike ridden by Floyd Landis

- 2006
  - March — IBM announces that they have built an electronic circuit around a CNT.
  - March — Nanotubes used as a scaffold for damaged nerve regeneration.
  - May — Method of placing nanotube accurately is developed by IBM.
  - June — Gadget invented by Rice University that can sort nanotubes by size and electrical properties.
  - July — Nanotubes were alloyed into the carbon fiber bike that was ridden by Floyd Landis to win the 2006 Tour de France.
- 2009
  - April — Nanotubes incorporated in virus battery.
  - A single-walled carbon nanotube was grown by chemical vapor deposition across a 10-micron gap in a silicon chip, then used in cold atom experiments, creating a black-hole-like effect on single atoms.

== 2010s ==
- 2012 January — IBM creates 9 nm carbon nanotube transistor that outperforms silicon.
- 2013
  - January – Research team at Rice University announce developing a new wet-spun nanotech fiber. The new fiber is made with an industrial scalable process. The fibers reported in Science have about 10 times the tensile strength and electrical and thermal conductivity of the best previously reported wet-spun CNT fibers.
  - September – Researchers build a carbon nanotube computer.
