= My Brother's Keeper (Sheffield novel) =

1982 novel by Charles Sheffield

- Cover of first edition
- Author: Charles Sheffield
- Language: English
- Genre: Science fiction novel
- Publisher: Ace Books
- Publication date: 1982
- Publication place: United States
- Media type: Print (Paperback)
- Pages: 216
- OCLC: 8720072

My Brother's Keeper is a 1982 science fiction novel by Charles Sheffield, published as a paperback original by Ace Books in 1982. It was reissued by Baen Books in 2000.

The story takes place in approximately 2000 from the perspective of the early 80s. The hero of the story is a professional concert pianist, who has a twin brother who does mysterious work for the US State Department. The brothers are in a helicopter crash and in order for one of them to survive, doctors use experimental neurosurgery to combine parts of their remaining brains. When the patient awakens, the pianist brother is in control of the body, but has access to his brother's memories and realizes he must complete the spy's last mission for him.

== Reception ==
John Clute described the novel as "energetic [but] culpable in its partial failure to deliver the goods," faulting Sheffield for setting up "a split-brain problem to end all split-brain problems" posing significant philosophical issues, then jettisoning them to write "an international chase thriller."
