= Georgia on My Mind (novelette) =

- Short story by Charles Sheffield
- Language: English
- Genre: Science fiction

Publication
- Published in: Analog Science Fiction and Fact
- Publication type: Magazine
- Publication date: January 1993

"Georgia on My Mind" (1993) is an English language science fiction novelette by Charles Sheffield. It won both the 1993 Nebula Award for Best Novelette and the 1994 Hugo Award for Best Novelette.

The novelette involves two major themes: being widowed and the quest for a legendary Babbage computer. The "Georgia" of the title is the remote South Georgia Island which lies just north of Antarctica.

== Plot ==
The narrator, a computer scientist, gets a letter from former colleague Bill Rigley indicating that he has discovered components of an analytical engine which was apparently built in rural New Zealand in the mid 19th century. Traveling to New Zealand, the narrator is shown the machinery, which was discovered under a farm house near Dunedin as well as a book of scientific drawings and a journal. The journal contains entries written by someone with the initials L.D. who is in a romantic relationship with someone else, also with the initials L.D. One of them, a woman, built the analytical engine, the other drew the nature drawings. The narrator begins reading the journal. It is an account written by Luke Derwent who had fled to New Zealand with his half sister Louisa Derwent after the two fell in love and married. While Louisa builds her analytical engine, Luke explores the southern ocean with the help of Maori guides. On one of these explorations, Luke meets beings who the Maori call "the cold loving people". While these beings lack the "outward aspect" of humans, they are clearly intelligent and have amazing machines, including powerful medicine. Louisa takes sick and Luke determines to travel with her to the base of the "cold loving people" so that they may heal her. Bill shows the narrator a picture which Luke drew of the beings, which Louisa had named "Heteromorphs", showing them to be spider-like creatures about three feet tall. The narrator and Bill use information provided in Luke's journal to calculate that the Heteromorphs' base was on South Georgia Island. They begin planning a mission to South Georgia, hoping to beat several other groups which, having heard of the discovery, are planning to make their way to the island.
