= Tomorrow and Tomorrow (novel) =

1997 novel by Charles Sheffield

- First edition
- Author: Charles Sheffield
- Cover artist: Bruce Jensen
- Language: English
- Genre: Science fiction
- Publisher: Bantam Spectra
- Publication date: 1997
- Publication place: United States
- Media type: Paperback
- Pages: 422
- ISBN: 0553378082
- OCLC: 34471197
- Dewey Decimal: 813/.54 20
- LC Class: PS3569.H39253 T66 1997

Tomorrow and Tomorrow is a 1997 science fiction novel by Charles Sheffield. The book starts in approximately the year 2020 and follows the protracted adventures of Drake Merlin, in his quest to save his wife from a terminal brain disease, over the course of eons. Similar premises are presented in the 2006 film The Fountain, as well as the Isaac Asimov story "The Last Question".

== Plot summary ==
Originally, Drake is a professional musician, with minor celebrity. When his wife Ana is diagnosed with an unspecified incurable brain disorder, Drake exhausts every option attempting to cure her. Only then does he decide to have her body cryogenically stored, in the hopes future generations will discover an effective treatment. However, Drake is extremely cautious, and in case the future culture doesn't care about her plight, he has himself frozen as well. Furthermore, he devotes all his energies for a decade before his freezing to becoming an expert primary source on the musically notable people of his era. He correctly assumes that if you become the world's foremost expert in any subject, eventually someone will want to write a book on that exact subject. At that time the hypothetical future writer will want to awaken Drake, and he can in turn awaken his wife, if treatment is available. He is awakened in the year 2512. Although society is vastly different, no cure for Ana yet exists. He spends six years apprenticed to a musical historian to pay for his reviving costs and to gain a foothold in this new world.

Drake is continually laid dormant and revived, progressively later into the future, all the way until the time of the Big Crunch. Human civilization alters radically over the eons, but Ana's mangled brain proves an extremely difficult problem. Despite the incomprehensible changes surrounding him in each successive awakening, Drake never loses sight of his mission.

Eventually, in the extremely remote posthuman future a few billion years later, Drake's original biological body has disintegrated, despite the cryogenic treatment, and he has become an uploaded consciousness, though still in stasis. At this point the descendants of humanity have colonized the entire Milky Way galaxy, yet an inexplicable threat is wiping out their colonies in a widening arc. The leaders of this civilization have exhausted every answer they can conceive of and have no information as to even the cause of the threat. Their last hope is Drake, an ancient holdover, who may have ideas new to them—namely, war.

The main problem is that the beings have no idea what is happening because the planets wiped out seem exactly the same, but they do not respond to signals, and outside communication is impossible. All probes sent do not return, nor do they reply once they reach the surface of the planet.

Drake becomes the commander of the residents of the galaxy, in designing weapons and defenses, ideas that have long vanished from the minds of these beings. At this time, their technology allows for extremely powerful and deep manipulation of matter at a fundamental scale. An experimental technology called the caesura is used as the plot device to carry the novel. It is a means of instantaneous teleportation using exotic physics, which has by now developed to a stage where it will have no meaning to the causal being. This caesura is not guaranteed teleportation but has a low chance of succeeding.

Billions upon billions of copies of Drake are thus sent out to the planets on the border of the invasion, and by means of the caesura they are teleported back to the base to collect information about the threat. Eventually it is discovered that the threat is an exotic interplanetary type of plant life with spores that migrate between systems. These plants do not intentionally destroy the living beings on the planet, but as a result of their growth they do so.

After the cause of the problem is found, the posthumans decide that the militant Drake is no longer needed or deemed a positive influence—he is seen as too warlike. They tell him to merge with all the returning Drake copies, of which there are billions. This he agrees to, and over billions of years, he collates those copies—forming a collective mind of copies of himself. In one subplot, a version of himself was randomly teleported by the caesura to a distant galaxy, and he manages to return over a few billion years.

Finally, the collective version of Drake resolves to use the Omega Point to gain complete knowledge of everything and to restore Ana. The story ends on an ambiguous note as Ana is potentially revived, and they seek to create a new universe by means of the caesura to live in.
