= Borazon =

Brand name of a cubic form of boron nitride (cBN)

Borazon is a brand name of a cubic form of boron nitride (cBN). Its color ranges from black to brown and gold. It is one of the hardest known materials, along with various forms of diamond and other kinds of boron nitride. Borazon is a crystal created by heating equal quantities of boron and nitrogen at temperatures greater than 1800 °C (3300 °F) at 7 GPa (1 million lbf/in^{2}).

Borazon was first produced in 1957 by Robert H. Wentorf, Jr., a physical chemist working for the General Electric. In 1969, General Electric adopted the name Borazon as its trademark for the material. The trademark is now owned by Diamond Innovations, doing business as Hyperion Materials & Technologies, Inc., and Borazon is manufactured only by Hyperion Materials & Technologies.

== Uses and production ==
Borazon has a number of uses, such as: cutting tools, dies, punches, shears, knives, saw blades, bearing rings, needles, rollers, spacers, balls, pump and compressor parts, engine and drive train components (e.g. camshafts, crankshafts, gears, valve stems, drive shafts, CV joints, piston pins, fuel injectors, turbochargers, and aerospace and land-based gas turbine parts such as vanes, blades, nozzles, and seals), surgical knives, blades, scissors, honing, superfinishing, cylinder liners, connecting rods, grinding of steel and paper mill rolls, and gears.

Prior to the production of Borazon, diamond was the preferred abrasive used for grinding very hard superalloys but it could not be used effectively on steels because carbon tends to dissolve in iron at high temperatures. Aluminium oxide was the conventional abrasive used on hardened steel tools.

Borazon replaced aluminium oxide for grinding hardened steels owing to its superior abrasive properties, comparable to that of diamond. Borazon is used in industrial applications to shape tools, as it can withstand temperatures greater than 2000 °C (3632 °F), much higher than that of a pure diamond at 871 °C (1600 °F). Other uses include jewellery designing, glass cutting and laceration of diamonds.

CBN-coated grinding wheels, referred to as Borazon wheels, are routinely used in the machining of hard ferrous metals, cast irons, and nickel-base and cobalt-base superalloys. They can grind more material, to a higher degree of accuracy, than any other abrasive. The limiting factor in the life of such tools is typically determined not by wear on the cutting surface but by its break-down and separation from the metal core resulting from failure of the bonding layer.

== Cultural references ==
A Borazon drill is used in the TV miniseries and film Quatermass and the Pit. In this story an alien spacecraft is unearthed in London and the drill is used in an attempt to open a sealed bulkhead. The shell of the object is so hard that even the Borazon drill makes no impression, and when the attempt is made, vibrations cause severe distress in people around the object.

In Ivan Yefremov's novel Andromeda: A Space-Age Tale (written 1954–1956, published Jan 1957) boron nitride named borazon is routinely used in sublight engine parts and spaceship surface coating.

In Randall Garrett's's short story "Thin Edge" (Analog, Dec 1963) a fictional borazon-tungsten cable of extraordinary tensile strength is a central plot element. The cable is developed by asteroid miners for a tow-rope for hauling asteroids. The protagonist cuts through cell bars and booby-traps his room using a single strand of the wire, similar to a monomolecular wire.

== See also ==
- Abrasive machining
