= Isaac Walton Taber =

American illustrator

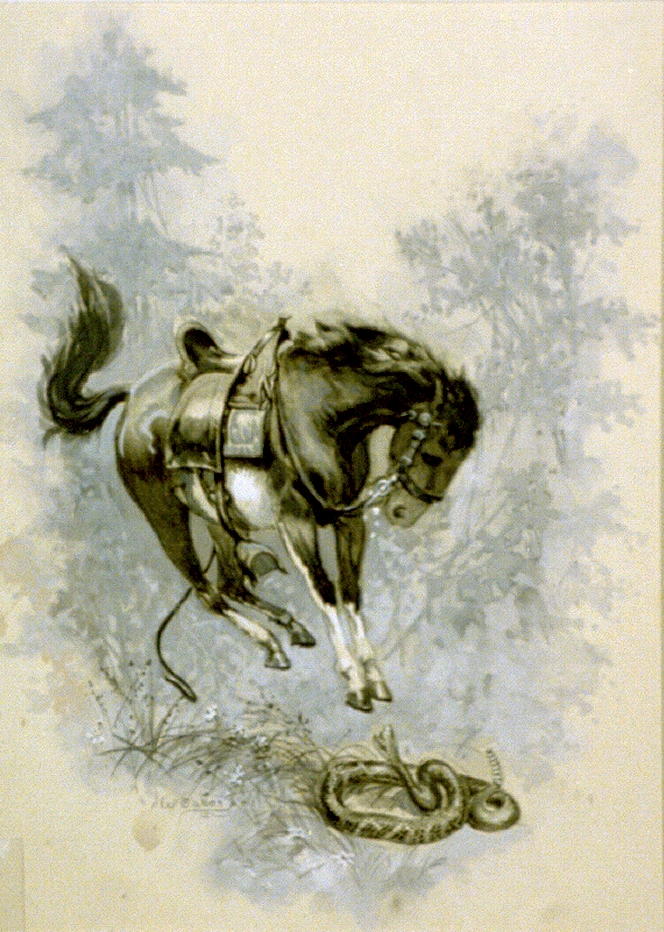
Samanthy kills the rattlesnake

Isaac Walton Taber (c. 1857 – February 12, 1933) was an American illustrator active in the late 19th and early 20th centuries. He was also known as "Walton Taber." As his work was often credited to "I. W. Taber," he has been confused with the photographer Isaiah West Taber (1830-1912).

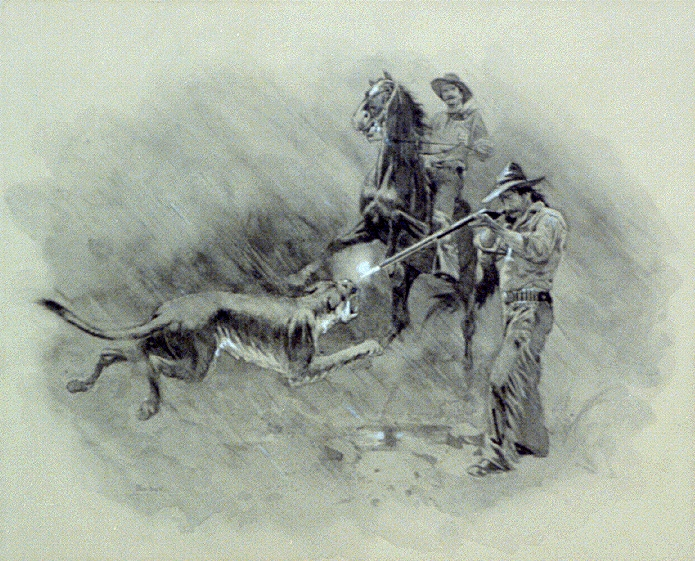
Will's rifle went off but without effect

Born in New Bedford, Massachusetts, Taber was the third of four sons born to merchant Isaac W. Taber and Lydia (née Hart) Taber. He studied at the Cooper Union Art School and exhibited at the Pennsylvania Academy (1880-1881; 1893). He was known for his pen and ink work drawn from photographs; he created 250 illustrations for the four-volume Battles and Leaders of the Civil War.

Taber's illustrations were published in magazines including St. Nicholas and Century. Tabor illustrated Rudyard Kipling's Captains Courageous, Frank T. Bullen's Cruise of the Cachalot, and the 1899 edition of Herman Melville's Moby Dick.

Taber died in New York City on February 12, 1933.
