= Resurgence (novel) =

2002 novel by Charles Sheffield

- First edition cover Cover art by Bob Eggleton
- Author: Charles Sheffield
- Genre: Science fiction
- Publisher: Baen
- Publication date: November 2002
- ISBN: 978-0-7434-3567-3

Resurgence (2002) is a science fiction novel by American writer Charles Sheffield, the finale of the Heritage Universe and the last book he published. Following the previous book in the series, Convergence, there are no more Builder artifacts left in the part of the galaxy explored by the four clades of the Orion Arm. However, an envoy from the neighboring Sagittarius Arm shows a short route to that arm and the ship's dead passengers carry an ominous message: a force even stronger than the Builders is consuming whole star systems in the neighboring arm.

The team gets together one last time in an attempt to find the envoy's home planet. They work to discover if the Builders touched the Sag arm in a way similar to the local arm. They attempt to see if the source of this mysterious enemy can be found so that future generations may study it and find a way to stop it before it reaches the local arm in the millennia ahead.
