= Transcendence (Sheffield novel) =

1992 novel by Charles Sheffield

- First US edition (publ. Del Rey Books); Cover art by Bruce Jensen
- Author: Charles Sheffield
- Language: English
- Publication date: 1992

Transcendence (1992) is a science fiction novel by American writer Charles Sheffield, part of his Heritage Universe series. This book is the sequel to Summertide and Divergence.

== Plot ==
After discovering new artifacts in the previous books, the team gets together again this time to search for the Zardalu unwittingly unleashed upon the galaxy during their previous adventure. This search leads them to the Zardalu Communion and the exploration of a huge space-time anomaly called the Torvil Anfract.

The novel includes excerpts from the Hot Rocks, Warm Beer, Cold Comfort: Jetting Alone Around the Galaxy, a sort-of travel book by Captain Alonzo Wilberforce Sloane (retired).

The sequel to this novel is Convergence.
