= History Lesson =

- Short story by Arthur C. Clarke
- Country: United Kingdom
- Language: English
- Genre: Science fiction

Publication
- Published in: Startling Stories
- Publisher: Better Publications
- Publication date: 1949

"History Lesson" is a science fiction short story by British writer Arthur C. Clarke, first published in 1949 in the magazine Startling Stories.

The two-part story speculates on the cooling of the Sun as a doomsday scenario for Earth and an evolutionary advent for Venus.

== Plot summary ==
The first part of the story is told from the perspective of a tribe of nomadic humans of the 30th century, in a future where Earth has entered a final ice age. The tribe is travelling toward the equator ahead of glaciers that are descending from the North Pole, but discovers, when they arrive in the last hospitable region of the planet, that glaciers from the South Pole have already almost reached them. The tribe carries with it a few relics from the previous centuries which it considers sacred, although the functions of the various objects have been forgotten. A generation later, just before the two glaciers fronts meet and spell ultimate extinction of the human species, the relics are safely relocated to a cairn on a mountain that stands between the two advancing bodies of ice. Among the relics there is a radio beacon built as an asteroid-tracking device that was never deployed but is still functioning.

The second part of the story is told from the perspective of a race of Venusian reptiles who have evolved into intelligent beings capable of space travel in the 5,000 years since the cooling of the Sun. The Venusians travel to Earth and, attracted by the radio beacon, manage to recover the relics of the last tribe of humans, now the only remnants of civilization not buried under ice. The title of the story comes from the attempts of the Venusian scientists to reconstruct the life and times of erect bipeds that once walked on the Third Planet. After centuries of fruitless studies of humankind's last writings found in the relics the scientists believe a major breakthrough when they manage to decipher the working principle of a film reel that apparently contains an animated cartoon short, which ends with a section of text, which no amount of effort and speculation can decipher: "A Walt Disney Production".

== Similarities with other works by Clarke ==
- According to Clarke's introduction to his story collection Reach for Tomorrow, this story shares its roots with "Rescue Party". "Rescue Party" is similar in that the Sun is changing in a way that dooms Earth. However, rather than cooling, it explodes, destroying all planets, and the response of humans to the event and the stories' endings are very different.
- He further indicated that "History Lesson" and "The Forgotten Enemy" shared glacier(s) as a central thematic element.
- There is another similarity with "Rescue Party" and also with "Trouble with the Natives" and 3001: The Final Odyssey. In all four stories, aliens draw naive conclusions from little information about humans — a movie reel in this story, a 2D portrait in "Rescue Party", some BBC broadcasts in "Trouble with the Natives", and information taken from the end of the "Century of Torture", the 20th, in 3001: The Final Odyssey.
- In one aspect, this story is very similar to a story in Clarke's 2010 Odyssey Two: superfast evolution of smart animals on a world newly made habitable. In 2010, the heating up of Europa brings native animals to the stage of human cavemen in just 20,000 years; in this story, the cooling of Venus brings Venusians to the level of spacefarers in just 5,000 years.
- At the end of The Fountains of Paradise, the Sun cools temporarily (nevertheless for thousands of years, as in another "ice age") turning Earth into an icy wasteland. This situation is very similar to first story of "History Lesson". But the response of humans to this doomsday scenario is very different in the two works.

== Publication ==
"History Lesson" was included in Clarke's anthology Expedition to Earth, published in 1953. In the British edition (Sidgwick & Jackson, 1954), the title was "Expedition to Earth", while the story otherwise also known under that title appeared there as Encounter in the Dawn.
