= Mary Ambree =

English army captain from Antwerpen (fl. 1584)

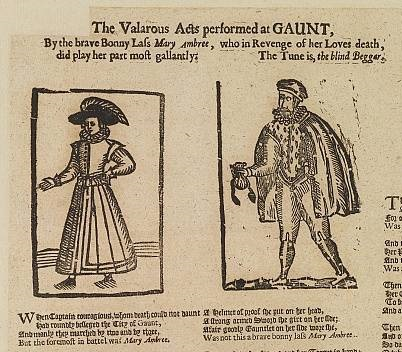
- An illustrated ballad telling the story of Mary Ambree
- Years active: fl. 1584
- Known for: Military captain who inspired songs and stories

Mary Ambree (fl. 1584) was an English army captain from Antwerp who participated in the liberation of the Belgian city Ghent during the war against Spain. While she has not been recorded extensively in history, she was featured in ballads and referenced in culture from the 1620s onwards. Notably, one ballad about Ambree was one of the most popular ballads of the 17th century.

In 1584 the Spanish captured Ghent, and Ambree, along with several other Dutch and English volunteers, fought to liberate the city. It was said that she was avenging her lover, Sir John Major, a sergeant major who died during the siege.

English and folklore professor Dianne Dugaw dates the story of Ambree based on a ballad about her being listed on 1590s' song sheets. Dugaw believes that this would have originally been a "news song" which told the public about current events.

"Then captains courageous, whom death could not daunt,
Did march to the siege of the city of Gaunt,
They mustered their soldiers by two and by three,
And the foremost in battle was Mary Ambree."

== Legacy ==
Anbree was a popular subject of ballads during the 17th century from 1620s onwards. She was also referenced in many works and by various writers and other artists. Because of her notoriety, Ambree became an "archetype of gender disguise".

- Ambree was the subject of the ballad "The valorous acts performed at Gunt by the brave bonnie lass Mary Ambree, who in revenge of her lovers death did play her part most gallantly. The tune is, The blinde beggar, &c." preserved by Thomas Percy in the Pepys Collection.
  - The ballad provided the title for Rudyard Kipling's well-known novel Captains Courageous.
  - The first lines of this ballad are quoted in The First Part of the Return from Parnassus from The Three Parnassus Plays
- A female French Legionnaire in the book Sowing Glory by P.C. Wren was referred to by the pseudonym of "Mary Ambree" in order to protect her identity.
- Ambree is mentioned in The Scornful Lady
- Ambree may have been the "English Mall" Samuel Butler referenced in Hudibras
- Ben Jonson references Ambree in Epicœne, or The Silent Woman and The Fortunate Isles
- Jonathan Swift references Ambree in A Tale of a Tub
- Ballad sang and Mary Ambree referenced in Jamestown Season 2 Episode 6.
