= Between the Strokes of Night =

1985 novel by Charles Sheffield

- Cover of the first edition, published by Baen Books, Art by Bob Eggleton
- Author: Charles Sheffield
- Genre: Science fiction
- Publisher: Baen Books
- Publication date: July 1, 1985
- ISBN: 978-0-671-55977-9

Between the Strokes of Night (1985) is a science fiction novel by English-American writer Charles Sheffield. It first appeared in the March to June 1985 issues of Analog Science Fiction/Science Fact before being published by Baen Books in July 1985. The story is divided into two vastly separated periods: the near future of 2010, and the far future of 29,000 AD. Owing to the unique technological mechanisms of the novel, the same cast of characters appears in both parts, though it is not a time travel story.

== Plot summary ==
The story begins in the year 2010, which was 25 years in the future from the time of the novel's writing. A UN financed research lab is pursuing a strange goal: manipulate metabolism and brain function in order to eliminate the need for sleep. They are currently working on Kodiak bears and domestic cats, but hope to adapt their techniques to humans. The world situation is very dire. Global warming is in full swing. Crop failures and production shortfalls are dragging down the standard of living, with no sign of relenting. Political tensions are very high.

Meanwhile, an eccentric billionaire industrialist has privately financed the construction of many massive orbital arcologies. Via asteroid mining these space stations have become the world's single richest entity. The UN cuts funding for the zero-sleep lab and the industrialist hires their entire staff to work in his primary station.

In the middle of the scientist's rocket approach to the station, catastrophe strikes. China, whose population is suffering massive famine, launched a desperate nuclear attack against the West. The mutually assured destruction policy plays out and the new station residents watch as the world is destroyed below them. The industrialist is so distraught by the end of Earth civilization he suffers a fatal heart attack. His dying words to the chief scientist instruct her that his real motive for hiring them was to research suspended animation technology. His dream is to fit the arcologies with interstellar drives and create human colonies on extrasolar planets.

The novel then begins Part II nearly 30,000 years later. On a planet called Pentecost in the Eta Cassiopeiae system, a large human civilization of indeterminate technological level now exists. A standout feature of their culture is "Planetfest" a series of grueling endurance challenges. The top 25 finalists are given large prizes like high government positions or land holdings. This civilization is only aware of their Earth origins in a legendary sense. They have limited space travel capacity, and citizens who go to work in space come back with rumors about beings called Immortals, who apparently live forever and can travel light years in days, and have some kind of shadowy influence on their planetary government.

The story follows a Planetfest contestant, Perón, who has just found he finished in 3rd place. This year the winners are all taken to space, where further competition will send the top 10 to meet and work with the mysterious Immortals. Perón makes fast friends with the other top finalists and during their next cycle of challenges begin to uncover suspicious elements of the Immortals, Planetfest, and their entire society. During one of the off-planet trials, Perón is critically injured and another contestant (a ringer for the Immortals) makes a snap decision to bring him to the Immortals prematurely in order to save his life.

Perón awakens on a space ship in a strange dream-like state, and is introduced to the ship's Immortal crew, some of whom are scientists from the first part of the book. They consider Perón a nuisance for circumventing the normal process of being indoctrinated into Immortal society from a distance before meeting them. He is given very little information, but witnesses the Immortals teleport throughout the ship and make objects appear in their hands at will. His compatriates are all being held in suspended animation. Perón breaks away from the Immortal's monitoring and discovers the secret to their power. He gains control of the ship, awakens his friends, and holds the ship hostage until the Immortals explain what's going on.

The last 30 millennia of human history is then summarized quickly. After the nuclear holocaust the self-sufficient space arcologies (with a total population less than 1 million) began to fragment and some went off looking for new planets, as their industrialist founder had intended. The majority stayed in earth orbit, continuing to use the resources available in our home system. The travelers developed very slowly, because they had to spend all their energy on survival in deep space. Those left behind continued scientific research and tried to re-colonize Earth, but the severe nuclear winter led into 10,000 year ice age.

Their crowning scientific achievement was called Mode II Consciousness or S-Space. This was an accidental byproduct of their zero-sleep project, which revealed a way to slow human metabolism and consciousness such that they would remain fully aware, but perceive time at 1/2000th the normal rate. This explains how they live "forever" and can travel between stars in "days", because they are calculated from the subjective perspective of someone living in S-Space. The Immortals' ability to make objects appear in their hands instantly, is just a result of service robots placing the object in their hand at normal speed, which is too fast to notice from the perspective of S-Space.

After this discovery, the leading arcology decides to track down the traveling arcologies. Their trip takes place in S-Space so they never age, gaining their Immortal moniker. Meanwhile, the normal space (N-space) travelers have endured hundreds of generations and repeated political upheavals. The Immortals discover that due to their twisted metabolisms they cannot breed. Using their vastly superior technology, they control the new planet-based colonies from behind the scenes and use the Planetfest games as a recruiting method to reinforce their numbers. Perón and company commandeer the ship and go back to their legendary roots of Earth, while in S-Space.

En route they realize that centuries have passed on their homeworld and there is no point in ever returning. The ship also encounters shadowy deep-space life forms of ambiguous intelligence, who are only visible from S-space. The Immortal crew dismisses this routine sighting as just another mystery of the galaxy. Peron arrives on Earth, finding it as nothing more than a mostly frozen nature preserve. They discuss their next move and resolve to uncover more secrets about the Immortals. While in orbit around Earth they detect that a large portion of the radio traffic throughout the Immortals' communication network seems to be coming from nowhere.

When they track down the location they find the hidden Immortal headquarters isolated in deep space. Peron's gang manages to evade security and stowaway aboard a supply ship bound for the headquarters. Upon arrival they are immediately captured by the superior security at HQ. Here they meet the other scientist characters from Part I and are congratulated for coming so far. They are invited to become equal partners in the quest to solve a new problem.

Apparently the deep space life forms they briefly saw previously, are miniature versions of giant entities situated in the gulfs of deep space between galaxies. These enormous beings are unquestionably intelligent, and the Immortal HQ is actually a research station entirely devoted to studying them. These beings communicate on extremely long wavelengths, which are so slow, even S-Space is woefully inadequate to process them. However Immortals have interpreted some signals, which seem to indicate the Deep Space Beings predict that the stars in the spiral arm will all mysteriously go dark in the next 40,000 years; an impossibly short time on the cosmological scale. Whether the Deep Space beings are actively causing this artificial transformation is unknown.

To better understand the problem, the Immortals are devising a new T-Space which is an even more radical slowing of human consciousness. Perón's group agree to help, but insist on building a new facility that will be operated only in N-space, resisting the logic that S-Space is superior method of operation. After much debate, the Immortal scientists agree to the plan. The narrative ends here, but the last few pages are from the perspective of one of Perón's friends who has volunteered as a guinea pig for T-Space. He relates the last 5 T-minutes of the universe, which is over 1000 years of normal time. He witnesses the final Big Crunch while somehow he and the deep space beings remain unaffected by the singularity.
