= John H. Moore =

American anthropologist (1939–2016)

- Born: John Hartwell Moore; 27 February 1939; Williston, North Dakota
- Died: 10 August 2016 (aged 77)
- Scientific career
- Fields: Anthropology
- Workplaces: University of Florida

John Hartwell Moore (27 February 1939 – 10 August 2016) was an American anthropologist.

== Early life ==
He was born in Williston, North Dakota, and raised in Paragould, Arkansas. He earned a degree in chemical engineering at the University of Arkansas, then began working for Procter & Gamble. Moore then joined the United States Army and was active for the Vietnam War and Korean War. After his discharge in September 1964, Moore participated in the Selma to Montgomery marches. Influenced by his military service in Vietnam, he enrolled at New York University in 1967, completing a doctorate in anthropology in 1974.

== Career ==
Moore taught at Albion College, the University of Oklahoma, and subsequently at the University of Florida, where he served as chair of the anthropology department.

His research specialties included North American Indian ethnology, kinship, demography, and sociocultural evolution. His fieldwork included research with the Cheyenne, Mvskoke Creek, Seminole, Choctaw, Cree, and Pamunkey. His most recent work is a demographic exploration of the feasibility of space colonization, published by NASA in the book Interstellar Travel and Multi-Generational Space Ships.

He was featured in the "Spacemen” episode of National Geographic Channel’s Naked Science television series. He worked as a consultant and expert witness on behalf of Native American groups who are seeking to protect their land, resources, and treaty rights, especially the descendants of those killed or attacked at the Sand Creek Massacre in Colorado in 1864, who were promised reparations under the Little Arkansas Treaty in 1865, which have never been paid. He was interested in the interactions between the biological and cultural aspects of "race," and was editor-in-chief of the 2007 Macmillan Encyclopedia of Race and Racism. He was a fellow of the American Association for the Advancement of Science, and former chair of the Anthropology Section.

== Personal life ==
He lived in Gainesville, Florida with his wife, Shelley Arlen. They raised two daughters. He died on 10 August 2016.
