= Higher Education (novel) =

1996 book by Charles Sheffield and Jerry Pournelle

- First book edition
- Author: Charles Sheffield and Jerry Pournelle
- Cover artist: Vincent Di Fate
- Language: English
- Series: Jupiter series
- Genre: Science fiction
- Publisher: Tor Books
- Publication date: 1996
- Publication place: United States
- Media type: Print (hardback & paperback)
- ISBN: 0-312-86174-5
- OCLC: 34029753
- Dewey Decimal: 813/.54 20
- LC Class: PS3569.H39253 H54 1996

Higher Education is a 1996 science fiction novel by American writer Charles Sheffield and Jerry Pournelle. It first appeared in the February to May 1986 issues of Analog Science Fiction and Fact The book is part of the Jupiter series and was first published in book form by Tor Books in June 1986.

== Plot introduction ==
The novel starts in a future dystopian Earth where the United States has become a woefully inefficient bureaucratized nation. The public school system is primarily interested in promoting self-esteem rather than learning. For example, the vast majority of public high school graduates are illiterate, and end up in "the pool"; an endless crowd of unemployable youths depending on government assistance or crime for survival. The book is told from the perspective of the main character, a high school student named Rick who quickly finds himself expelled after a practical joke goes wrong.

== Plot summary ==
Since expulsion means that Rick's family will no longer be able to claim their welfare bonus, Rick begins looking for a job. One of his former teachers encourages him to get a job for the Vanguard Mining corporation, whose primary financial interest is in space mining of asteroids in the asteroid belt. The book follows his progress through an initial grueling examination period on Earth, initial training on an asteroid in a high orbit of Earth, and through an apprenticeship on another training facility in the asteroid belt. After proving himself, Rick is recruited to join a secret program to infiltrate and subvert Earth's education systems away from its current initiative-deadening pandering to the lowest common denominator.

== Characters ==
- "Rick" is the primary protagonist of the novel. He is a high-school student who is forced to take a job mining asteroids after being expelled from school.
- "Turkey Gossage" is Rick's instructor on the asteroid in Earth orbit. He is tough, unforgiving and unyielding.

== Reception ==
Critical reception was mostly positive, with Booklist listing Higher Education on its Editor's Choice list for 1996 and named it a "Top 10 fantasy novels for young readers." Kirkus Reviews gave Higher Education a mixed review, writing that fans of the authors' previous works would enjoy the novel but expressing frustration that the female characters were "either girlfriend material (Deedee Mao), corporate saboteurs (Alice Klein), or space sluts (Monkey Cruse, "rumored to have run a professional sex service"). Those stereotypical characterizations, the melodramatic plot, and the dialogue turn the adventure into a space soap opera.".
