= Cold as Ice (novel) =

1992 novel by Charles Sheffield

- First edition (publ. Tor Books); Cover art by Vincent Di Fate
- Author: Charles Sheffield
- Genre: Science fiction
- Publisher: Tor Books
- Publication date: June 1, 1992
- ISBN: 0-312-85139-1

Cold as Ice (1992) is a science fiction novel by Charles Sheffield. The setting takes place in the late 21st century with humans having colonized the Solar System, and a terrible civil war recently resolved in which 50% of humanity was wiped out. The plot follows an eclectic group of characters sorting out a mystery initiated during the early days of the war. Like most of Sheffield's books, in addition to hard scifi descriptions of a convincing future world, intricate psychologies of the major characters play a crucial role.

Cold as Ice has been through six editions and remains in print more than twenty years after initial publication.
