= Measurements of Earth Data for Environmental Analysis =

Scientific program

MEDEA was a post-Cold-War project of the intelligence community of the United States to leverage US global surveillance records and capabilities for the scientific study of climate change. The name MEDEA was chosen by Margaret MacDonald, the wife of the first Chair of MEDEA, Dr. Gordon MacDonald, and came from Greek Mythology, Jason and the Golden Fleece. (MEDEA is not an acronym).

In 1992, then-Senator Al Gore and with the direction of Director of Central Intelligence Robert Gates, the Environmental Task Force (ETF) was formed, which in 1993 became MEDEA. More than 860,000 historical satellite photographs were analyzed by a group of dozens of scientists and new satellite photographs were captured and declassified.

The program was shut down early in the George W. Bush administration, re-started in 2010 under the Obama administration, and concluded in 2015.
