= The Fountains of Paradise =

1979 science fiction novel by Arthur C. Clarke

- Cover of the first UK edition
- Author: Arthur C. Clarke
- Cover artist: Terry Oakes
- Language: English
- Genre: Science fiction
- Publisher: Victor Gollancz (UK); Harcourt Brace Jovanovich (US)
- Publication date: 1979
- Publication place: United Kingdom
- Media type: Print (Hardback & Paperback)
- Pages: 256
- ISBN: 0-575-02520-4
- OCLC: 4993570

The Fountains of Paradise is a 1979 science fiction novel by British writer Arthur C. Clarke. Set in the 22nd century, it describes the construction of a space elevator. This "orbital tower" is a giant structure rising from the ground and linking with a satellite in geostationary orbit at the height of approximately 36,000 kilometres (approx. 22,300 miles). Such a structure would be used to raise payloads to orbit without the expense of using rockets. The novel won both the Hugo and Nebula Awards for Best Novel.

== Plot ==
=== Summary ===
The novel focuses primarily on a project known as the Orbital Tower proposed by the main character, Vannevar Morgan. The tower is to stretch from the Earth's equator to a satellite that is in geostationary orbit. Such a structure would greatly reduce the cost of sending people and supplies into space.

The main story is framed by two other stories. The first one tells of King Kalidasa, living thousands of years before Morgan is born, who is constructing a 'pleasure garden' complete with functioning fountains, in a significant engineering effort for the time. The other story, taking place long after Morgan has died, deals with aliens making contact with Earth.

Due to many technical issues, there are only two locations on Earth where the Orbital Tower can be built. One is in the middle of the Pacific Ocean, and the other is Sri Kanda (a thinly veiled reference to Adam's Peak in Sri Lanka). However, there is a Buddhist temple on the island, and Mahanayake Thero, the head of the temple's order, refuses to give permission to begin construction.

Hearing of the difficulties, a group of people living on Mars contacts Morgan and suggests that the tower be built there instead. It would be smaller than the one planned for Earth, and would reach from Mars to one of its moons, Deimos.

After a few setbacks, including some fatalities, construction of the tower gets underway. Although the engineer's heart is failing, he rides up the tower to take food and oxygen to a group of stranded students and their professor. After overcoming serious difficulties he succeeds, then dies of a heart attack on the way back down.

== Themes ==
The main theme of the novel is preceded by, and to some extent juxtaposed with, the story of the life and death of King Kashyapa I of Sri Lanka (fictionalized as King Kalidasa). It foreshadows the exploits of Vannevar Morgan in his determination to realize the space elevator.

Other subplots include human colonization of the Solar System and the first contact with extraterrestrial intelligence.

Clarke envisions a microscopically thin (in his demonstrator sample) but strong "hyperfilament" that makes the elevator possible. Although the hyperfilament is constructed from "continuous pseudo-one-dimensional diamond crystal", Clarke later expressed his belief that another type of carbon, buckminsterfullerene, would play the role of hyperfilament in a real space elevator. The latest developments in carbon nanotube technology bring the orbital elevator closer to possible realization.

== Setting ==
The story is set in the fictional equatorial island country of Taprobane, which Clarke has described as "about ninety percent congruent with the island of Sri Lanka", south of its real-world location. The ruins of the palace at Yakkagala as described in the book very closely match the real-life ruins at Sigiriya in Sri Lanka. The mountain on which the space elevator is built is called Sri Kanda in the book, and bears a strong resemblance to the real mountain Sri Pada (Adam's Peak).

== Similarities with other works of Clarke ==
- In the middle of The Fountains of Paradise, an unmanned robotic spaceship of alien origin, called "Starglider" (from an origin world dubbed "Starholme") by Clarke, passes through the Solar system. This situation is similar to Rendezvous with Rama, though the ship and its interactions with humans are very different.
- The first third of 3001: The Final Odyssey describes details of the interior of the ring habitat that encircles Earth, and is connected to Earth's surface with four space elevators. At the end of The Fountains of Paradise, this ring habitat is shown for the first time, though it has six space elevators rather than the four of 3001: Final Odyssey.
- At the end of the novel, Earth turns into an icy wasteland because the Sun has cooled. The same situation also occurs in the story "History Lesson".
- The alien shown near the end of The Fountains of Paradise is a somewhat more physical form of the Swarm, the aliens that land on primeval Earth in "The Possessed".
- A space elevator is also constructed in the course of Clarke's final novel (co-written with Frederik Pohl), The Last Theorem.

== Awards and nominations ==
- Winner, Hugo Award for Best Novel - 1980
- Winner, Nebula Award for Best Novel - 1979
- Nominee, Locus Award for Best Science Fiction Novel - 1980
- Nominee, British Science Fiction Association Award - 1979

== See also ==
- Materials science in science fiction
- The Web Between the Worlds — a science fiction novel on the same subject by Charles Sheffield published almost simultaneously with The Fountains of Paradise
