= The Cyborg from Earth =

1998 novel by Charles Sheffield

- First edition
- Author: Charles Sheffield
- Cover artist: Vincent Di Fate
- Language: English
- Genre: Science fiction
- Publisher: Tor Books
- Publication date: February 15, 1998
- Publication place: United States
- Media type: Print (hardback & paperback)
- ISBN: 0-312-86407-8
- OCLC: 37437484
- Dewey Decimal: 813/.54 21
- LC Class: PS3569.H39253 C9 1998

The Cyborg from Earth is a 1998 science fiction novel by Charles Sheffield. It is the fourth in a series of unrelated stories, published by Tor Books in their Jupiter line.

== Plot introduction ==
The novel starts in a future dystopian Earth where the upper class lives a life of privilege, while most others live in the "pool", an endless crowd of unemployable youths depending on government assistance or crime for survival. The book is told from the perspective of the main character, Jefferson Kopal, a young member of an immensely wealthy and powerful spaceship building family founded by his Great Grandfather, Rollo Kopal, an admiral in the Space Navy. As part of the bylaws, all voting members of the company must have served honorably in the navy. Young Jeff is about to take his final test...

== Plot summary ==
"Jefferson Kopal is a coward. He knows it, and if he doesn't do something about it soon, so will everyone else." This is the self-evaluation of the novel's main protagonist. Jeff is about to take his final test before a Navy Review Board to see if he is fit for duty as an officer in the Space Navy. After failing the test most valiantly, Jeff is assigned to the Navy's Border Command, an apparent exile from the Solar System and prestigious Central Command, where all the great Kopals have served. Jeff is assigned to a ship that will take him into the Messina Dust Cloud, which residents of the Solar System call Cyborg Territory. After a confrontation with his cousin, Jeff leaves Kopal Manor and heads into space. Adjustment to naval life is at first hard on Jeff until he meets the two "'jinners" or engineers. He is at once at ease with them and is able to show his true interest, engineering. Unfortunately, Captain Dufferin, the Commanding Officer, feels that the Kopals are a plague on the Space Navy and intends to make Jeff suffer for his last name. Jeff is sent to the forward observation bubble prior to the jump to The Messina Dust Cloud. While contemplating his current situation, Jeff notices the formation of a "space sounder," a terrifying anomaly that has been known to destroy whole star ships, coming directly for the ship. Jeff warns the Bridge but then blacks out as the ship takes evasive action to avoid certain death. When Jeff awakes, he finds that he has been abandoned by Captain Dufferin and the majority of the crew. Mercy Hooglich, one of the 'jinners Jeff had befriended, explains how the captain and other officers had taken the runabout back to the Solar System, and are going to charge Jeff with dereliction of duty. Jeff also learns that his injuries were so extensive that to be saved, the medical technology of the Cloud, namely, nanotechnology, had to be used. The remainder of the story revolves around the "rebellion" of the Cloud Territory as well as Jeff fighting to restore his name and place in the family business. In the end, Jeff finds that he is not a coward and everyone else knows that as well.

== Continuity ==
The engines used by Vanguard Mining's spacecraft are Diabelli Omnivores. This particular brand of engine is used repeatedly throughout Sheffield's books, across many different fictional settings.
