= The Nimrod Hunt =

1986 novel by Charles Sheffield

- First edition cover Cover art by John Melo
- Author: Charles Sheffield
- Genre: Science fiction
- Publisher: Baen Books
- Publication date: August 1986

The Nimrod Hunt is a 1986 science fiction novel by American writer Charles Sheffield. The story takes place hundreds of years in the future, with humanity having extensively colonized surrounding space, including beyond the Solar System. Humans have encountered three extraterrestrial races, which although all bizarrely different in physiology and psychology coexist peacefully. In order to defend from unknown threats beyond known space, a security company creates highly advanced robotic soldiers to patrol the border. These go haywire and become the single greatest threat. A series of four-member teams, with a representative from each species, is dispatched to deal with the problem. The action of the story follows one such team.

The novel was revised as The Mind Pool with a different ending. In the preface to The Mind Pool, the author describes how he was unhappy with the original.

== Reception ==
Chicago Sun-Times book critic Roland J. Green penned a positive of the book, calling it "a considerable feat of both imagination and storytelling", "a well-told tale, full of wonders thrown off casually like sparks from a sparkler", and "a treat for readers who like their science fiction loaded with intelligent scientific extrapolation". The Baltimore Evening Sun's Wiley Hall III found the novel "worth the price" though said the publishers "exaggerated outrageously" when marketing it. In a negative review, Algis Budrys of The Magazine of Fantasy & Science Fiction wrote, "What we have here is a book that I think began with too strong a premise."

The Commodore Computing International reviewer D.M. praised the book, stating, "The interplay of the two main 'hunting' groups and the conniving and double-dealing of the operation's joint chiefs of staff, who are deadly rivals, made for gripping reading." In a mixed review, the authors Charles N. Brown and William G. Contento said, "It told a complex story well, and had some important things to say. I just wish the author had not done a disservice to his own, quite sufficient, storytelling abilities by referencing Alfred Bester so directly and so unnecessarily." The critic David Pringle gave the book two stars, writing, "The ingenious plot poses questions about the nature of intelligence, but it's a pity the prose and characterization are so clunky."
