= The Web Between the Worlds =

1979 science fiction novel by Charles Sheffield

- First US edition
- Author: Charles Sheffield
- Language: English
- Genre: Science fiction novel
- Publisher: Ace Books
- Publication date: 1979
- Publication place: United Kingdom
- Media type: Print (paperback)
- Pages: 274
- ISBN: 0-441-87862-8

The Web Between the Worlds is the second science fiction novel by Charles Sheffield. It was first published as a trade paperback by Ace Books in 1979, by the first UK edition in hardcover by Sidgwick & Jackson Ltd the following year. Further editions were published by Arrow Books, Ace Books, Del Rey/Ballantyne and others; in 2001 Baen Books issued a revised edition. The novel has also been translated into German and French. This novel and the simultaneously published novel The Fountains of Paradise, by Arthur C. Clarke, are the first popularization of the space elevator.

== Plot ==
The novel tells the story of Rob Merlin, the best engineer who has ever lived. His machine, the "Spider," extrudes graphite cables of incredible strength. Darius Regulo has a monopoly on space mining, and doesn't like rockets. Half of their fuel is used to lift the other half, a waste of energy. Regulo wants to build a space elevator, and hires Merlin to do it. Merlin will need to modify his Spider to extrude pure silicon cables, and to work in space.

As work progresses, Merlin becomes convinced that his parents' accidental deaths, when he was a child, were in fact murders. He comes to this conclusion based on conversations with Regulo's people he meets in the course of the project.

The questions of who, and why, become urgent as Merlin becomes certain that his life is in danger.

== Duplicate plot ==
This novel was published almost simultaneously with The Fountains of Paradise by Arthur C. Clarke. Through an amazing coincidence the two novels contained many similarities. Both protagonists are engineers who have built the world's longest bridge using a machine named the "Spider", both of whom are hired to build a space elevator, and both engineers modify their Spiders to produce a crystalline fiber.

When Baen Books reprinted this novel in 2001, they included an open letter that Clarke wrote in 1979 when the novel was first published. Clarke reassured the world that this similarity was, "A clear case of plagiarism? No—merely an idea whose time has come."
