= Charles Sheffield =

British mathematician, physicist and writer (1935–2002)

- Born: 25 June 1935; Kingston upon Hull, Yorkshire, England
- Died: 2 November 2002 (aged 67); Silver Spring, Maryland, U.S.
- Education: St John's College, Cambridge
- Occupations: Writer, scientist
- Spouses: Sarah Sanderson; Linda Zall; Nancy Kress (1998–death)
- Children: 4
- Writing career
- Period: 1977–2002 (fiction); 1962–? (professional)
- Genre: Science fiction
- Notable awards: John W. Campbell Memorial Award 1992 Brother to Dragons; Nebula Award 1993 Georgia on My Mind; Hugo Award 1994 Georgia on My Mind

Charles Sheffield (25 June 1935 – 2 November 2002), was an English-born mathematician, physicist, and science-fiction writer who served as a President of the Science Fiction and Fantasy Writers of America and of the American Astronautical Society.

His novel The Web Between the Worlds, featuring the construction of a space elevator, was published almost simultaneously with Arthur C. Clarke's novel on the subject, The Fountains of Paradise - a coincidence that amused them both. Excerpts from both Sheffield's The Web Between the Worlds and Clarke's The Fountains of Paradise have appeared recently in a space-elevator anthology, Towering Yarns.

Sheffield served as Chief Scientist of Earth Satellite Corporation, a company that processed remote-sensing satellite data. The association gave rise to many technical papers and two popular non-fiction books, Earthwatch (1981) and Man on Earth (1983), both collections of false-colour and enhanced images of Earth from space.

He won the Nebula and Hugo awards for his 1993 novelette "Georgia on My Mind" and the 1992 John W. Campbell Memorial Award for Best Science Fiction Novel for his 1992 novel Brother to Dragons.

Sheffield was Toastmaster at BucConeer, the 1998 World Science Fiction Convention in Baltimore. He was also a former President of Science Fiction and Fantasy Writes of America.

Before he died, he was writing a column for the Baen Books web-site; his last column concerned the discovery of the brain tumor that led to his death.

== Personal life ==
Charles Sheffield attended St John's College, Cambridge, where he graduated with a Double First in Mathematics and Physics. During his studies he met and later married his first wife, Sarah Sanderson, whose death in 1977 became the catalyst for his writing career. They had a son, Charles Christopher ("Kit"), and a daughter, Ann Elizabeth. The family soon after moved to the United States, where Sheffield began working in the field of practical physics, a career that would lead him to a consultancy with NASA and the role of chief scientist at the Earth Satellite Corporation in Washington.

In response to the traumatic grief from the death of his wife Sarah to cancer (in 1977), Sheffield began a second career as a science fiction author, winning both the prestigious Nebula and Hugo awards and serving as President of the Science Fiction and Fantasy Writers of America (1984–1986). He maintained two successful careers, consulting for various scientific corporations while earning fame for his hard science fiction. During this period he lived in Washington, DC, and met and married Linda Zall, a fellow scientist, and had two daughters, Elizabeth Rose and Victoria Jane.

At the time of his death, he was married to writer Nancy Kress, and lived with his children in Silver Spring, Maryland.

== Fiction ==
=== Series ===
==== Behrooz Wolf ====
1. Sight of Proteus, Ace September 1978; revised, NEL January 1989 – book version of the following linked stories:
  - "Sight of Proteus", Amazing May 1978
  - "Legacy", Galaxy June 1977
  - "The Grooves of Change", reprinted in Amazing Feb. 1979
2. Proteus Unbound, Analog August 1988 / NEL Jan. 1989 / Ballantine Del Rey March 1989
3. Proteus in the Underworld, Baen May 1995

Volumes 1 and 2 were reprinted in omnibus version Proteus Manifest (SFBC July 1989) and later in a revised omnibus version Proteus Combined (Baen May 1994)

==== The Heritage Universe ====
1. Summertide, Ballantine Del Rey Feb. 1990 – loosely based on
  - "Summertide", Destinies, August 1981
2. Divergence, Ballantine Del Rey, February 1991
3. Transcendence, Ballantine Del Rey, April 1992
4. Convergence, Baen April 1997
5. Resurgence, Baen November 2002

Volumes 1, 2 and 3 were reprinted in omnibus version The Heritage Universe (SFBC October 1992); Volumes 1 and 2 were reprinted in revised omnibus version Convergent Series (Baen October 1998); Volumes 3 and 4 were reprinted in revised omnibus version Transvergence (Baen November 1999)

==== Cold as Ice ====
1. Cold as Ice, Tor June 1992
2. The Ganymede Club, Tor December 1995
3. Dark as Day, Tor March 2002

==== Chan Dalton ====
1. The Mind Pool, Baen, April 1993 – revised and expanded from an earlier version:
  - The Nimrod Hunt, Baen, August 1986
2. The Spheres of Heaven, Baen, February 2001

==== Jupiter (Young Adult Novels) ====
1. Higher Education (with Jerry Pournelle), Analog February 1996 / Tor June 1996 – revised and expanded from
  - "Higher Education", Charles Sheffield & Jerry Pournelle, Future Quartet: Earth in the Year 2042: A Four-Part Invention, Ben Bova, Frederik Pohl, Jerry Pournelle and Charles Sheffield, AvoNova 1994
2. The Billion Dollar Boy, Tor April 1997
3. Putting Up Roots, Tor September 1997
4. The Cyborg from Earth, Tor March 1998

==== Supernova Alpha ====
- Aftermath, Bantam Spectra Aug. 1998
- Starfire, Bantam Spectra October 1999

==== Arthur Morton McAndrew ====
- The Compleat McAndrew, Baen April 2000 – a collection of linked stories:
  - "Killing Vector", Galaxy March 1978; read online
  - "Moment of Inertia", Analog October 1980; read online
  - "All the Colors of the Vacuum", Analog 2 February 1981
  - "Manna Hunt", Analog September 1982
  - "The Hidden Matter of McAndrew", Analog June 1992
  - "The Invariants of Nature", Analog April 1993
  - "Rogueworld", F&SF May 1983
  - "With McAndrew, Out of Focus", Science Fiction Age March 1999
  - "McAndrew and the Fifth Commandment", Analog September 1999

The Compleat McAndrew was preceded by two earlier versions: The McAndrew Chronicles, (Tor, June 1983) and One Man’s Universe (Tor, December 1993); also, Sheffield later wrote an additional McAndrew story:

- "McAndrew and THE LAW", Cosmic Tales: Adventures in Sol System, ed. T. K. F. Weisskopf, Baen June 2004; read online

==== Waldo Burmeister and Henry Carver, Space Attorneys ====
Sheffield wrote about this series:

In the late 1970s when I was just starting to write fiction, my young children (young back then, grown-ups now) ordered me to produce stories about every funny or disgusting thing in the world. They made the list for me. It had on it items of comic low appeal to them—sewage, visits to the dentist, mushrooms, fat aunts, opera singers, flatulence (I think they used a different word), comic Germans and Italians, fad diets, pigs, morticians, and head lice. Not an easy assignment, but I did my best. Over the years I have published ten politically incorrect stories tackling one or more of the listed topics... Together they form what I think of as my "sewage" series. They feature my two favourite lawyers, Henry Carver and Waldo Burmeister, and they are depressingly easy to write.

1. Space Suits (Fox Acre Press, August 2001); a collection of linked stories:
  - "Marconi, Mattin, Maxwell", Galaxy May 1977; read online
  - "Dinsdale Dissents", Galaxy July 1977
  - "The Deimos Plague", Stellar No. 4, ed. Judy-Lynn del Rey, Ballantine 1978; read online
  - "Perfectly Safe, Nothing to Worry About", Galaxy August 1977
  - "The Decline of Hyperion", Analog mid-Dec. 1992
  - "The Dalmatian of Faust", Galaxy September 1978
  - "A Certain Place in History", Galaxy October 1977
  - "Parasites Lost", Proteus: Voices for the 80s, ed. Richard S. McEnroe, Ace May 1981
  - "Fifteen-Love on the Dead Man’s Chest", Amazing May 1993
  - "With the Knight Male", The Chick is in the Mail, ed. Esther Friesner, Baen October 2000
  - "Space Opera", Analog mid-December 1988

==== Erasmus Darwin (Grandfather of Charles Darwin) ====
1. The Amazing Dr. Darwin, Baen June 2002 – a collection of linked stories:
  - "The Devil of Malkirk", F&SF June 1982; read online
  - "The Heart of Ahura Mazda", AHMM November 1988
  - "The Phantom of Dunwell Cove", Asimov's August 1995
  - "The Lambeth Immortal", AHMM June 1979
  - "The Solborne Vampire", AHMM January 1998
  - "The Treasure of Odirex", Fantastic July 1978
  - Appendix: Erasmus Magister: Fact and Fiction, Erasmus Magister, Ace 1982

The Amazing Dr. Darwin was preceded by an earlier version, Erasmus Magister (Ace, June 1982); also, Sheffield later wrote an additional Erasmus Darwin story:

- "The Demon of E Staircase", AHMM January 2003

=== Other novels ===
- The Web Between the Worlds, Ace August 1979, revised Baen Feb. 2001
- The Selkie (with David Bischoff), Macmillan March 1982 / Signet May 1983
- My Brother's Keeper, Ace August 1982
- Between the Strokes of Night, (n) Analog March 1985 (+3) / Baen July 1985 / significantly revised & expanded: Baen Nov. 2002
- Trader’s World, Ballantine Del Rey November 1988 – book version of linked stories:
  - "Trader’s Blood," (na) Analog April 1986
  - "Trader’s Partner," (nv) Analog July 1987
  - "Trader’s Cross," (nv) Analog March 1987
  - "Trader’s Secret," (nv) Analog August 1985
- Brother to Dragons, Baen Nov. 1992
  - Winner of the John W. Campbell Memorial Award for Best Science Fiction Novel of 1992
- Godspeed, Tor November 1993
- The Judas Cross (with David Bischoff), Warner Aspect December 1994
- Tomorrow and Tomorrow, Bantam Spectra January 1997 – revised and expanded from
  - "At the Eschaton," (na) Far Futures, ed. Gregory Benford, Tor December 1995

=== Other collections ===
- Vectors, Ace December 1979
  - "What Song the Sirens Sang", Galaxy April 1977; read online
  - "Fixed Price War", Analog May 1978; read online
  - "Marconi, Mattin, Maxwell", Galaxy May 1977; read online
  - "Power Failure", Fantastic April 1978
  - "Killing Vector", Galaxy March 1978; read online
  - "Dinsdale Dissents", Galaxy July 1977
  - "We Hold These Truths to Be Self-Evident", Fantastic December 1977
  - "Skystalk", Destinies August 1979
  - "How to Build a Beanstalk" (article), Destinies August 1979
  - "Transition Team", Destinies November 1978
  - "Bounded in a Nutshell", Analog July 1978
  - "The Long Chance", Galaxy November 1977
  - "The Treasure of Odirex", Fantastic July 1978
  - "The Dalmatian of Faust", Galaxy September 1978
- Hidden Variables, Ace July 1981
  - "The Man Who Stole the Moon", Destinies Summer 1980; read online
  - "The Deimos Plague", Stellar No. 4, ed. Judy-Lynn del Rey, Ballantine 1978; read online
  - "Forefather Figure", A Spadeful of Spacetime, ed. Fred Saberhagen, Ace 1981; read online
  - "Moment of Inertia", Analog October 1980; read online
  - "The New Physics: The Speed of Lightness, Curved Space, and Other Heresies", Analog September 1980
  - "From Natural Causes", Amazing August 1978
  - "Legacy", Galaxy June 1977
  - "The Softest Hammer", F&SF February 1981
  - "Hidden Variable", Destinies Fall 1980
  - "A Certain Place in History", Galaxy October 1977
  - "All the Colors of the Vacuum", Analog 2 February 1981
  - "Perfectly Safe, Nothing to Worry About", Galaxy Aug. 1977
  - "Summertide", Destinies v3 #2 1981
  - "The Marriage of True Minds", F&SF November 1980
- Dancing with Myself, Baen September 1993
  - "Out of Copyright", F&SF May 1989
  - "Tunicate, Tunicate, Wilt Thou Be Mine?", Asimov’s June 1985
  - "Counting Up" (article), New Destinies, Vol. VI, ed. Jim Baen, Baen 1988
  - "A Braver Thing", Asimov’s February 1990
  - "The Grand Tour", Analog May 1987
  - "Classical Nightmares and Quantum Paradoxes" (article), New Destinies, Vol. VII, ed. Jim Baen, Baen 1989
  - "Nightmares of the Classical Mind", Asimov’s Aug. 1989
  - "The Double Spiral Staircase", Analog January 1990
  - "The Unlicked Bear-Whelp" (article), New Destinies, Vol. IX, ed. Jim Baen, Baen 1990
  - "The Seventeen-Year Locusts", Asimov’s January 1983
  - "The Courts of Xanadu", Asimov’s April 1988
  - "C-change", Analog November 1992
  - "Unclear Winter" (article), New Destinies, Vol. IV, ed. Jim Baen, Baen 1988
  - "Godspeed", Analog July 1990
  - "Dancing with Myself", Analog August 1989
  - "Something for Nothing: A Biography of the Universe" (article)
- Georgia on My Mind and Other Places, Tor February 1995
  - "The Feynman Saltation", The Ultimate Dinosaur, ed. Byron Preiss & Robert Silverberg, Bantam Spectra 1992; read online
  - "The Bee's Kiss", Asimov's November 1994
  - "Millennium"
  - "Fifteen-Love on the Dead Man's Chest", Amazing May 1993
  - "Deep Safari", Asimov's March 1992
  - "Beyond the Golden Road", Arabesques 2, ed. Susan Shwartz, Avon 1989
  - "Health Care System", Asimov's Sep. 1990
  - "Humanity Test", Analog March 1989
  - "That Strain Again", Microcosmic Tales, ed. Isaac Asimov, Martin H. Greenberg & Joseph D. Olander, Taplinger 1980
  - "Destroyer of Worlds", Asimov's February 1989
  - "The Fifteenth Station of the Cross", Science Fiction Age July 1993
  - "Trapalanda", Asimov's June 1987
  - "Obsolete Skill", F&SF December 1987
  - "Georgia on My Mind", Analog Jan. 1993
    - Winner of the Nebula Award for Best Novelette of 1993
    - Winner of the Hugo Award for Best Novelette of 1993
- The Lady Vanishes and Other Oddities of Nature, Gale Group/Five Star June 2002
  - "The Lady Vanishes", Science Fiction Age Nov. 1996
  - "The Peacock Throne", Asimov's February 1996
  - "Brooks Too Broad for Leaping", Bending the Landscape: Science Fiction, ed. Nicola Griffith & Steven Pagel, White Wolf 1998
  - "The Art of Fugue", Asimov’s June 2000
  - "The Whole Three Yards"
  - "Cloud Cuckoo", Asimov’s July 1996
  - "Packing Fraction", Packing Fraction & Other Tales of Science & Imagination, ed. Julie E. Czerneda, Trifolium Books 1998
  - "Nuremberg Joys", Asimov’s March 2000
  - "What Would You Like to Know?", Science Fiction Age March 1997
  - "Waiting for the Riddlers", Analog March 1997
  - "Phallicide", Science Fiction Age September 1999

=== Anthologies ===
- How to Save the World, ed. Charles Sheffield, Tor September 1995

=== Short stories ===
- "Humanity Test" (1989)
- "The Double-Spiral Staircase" (1990?)
- "A Braver Thing" (1990)
- "Georgia on My Mind" (1993) (Hugo, Nebula)
- "Tunicate, Tunicate, Wilt Thou Be Mine" (1989)
- "Dies Irae" (1985)
- "Brooks Too Broad For Leaping" (1998)
- "The Diamond Drill" (2002)
- "The Demon of E Staircase" (2003)

== Nonfiction ==
- Earthwatch: A Survey of the World from Space (Macmillan 1981)
- Man on Earth: How Civilization and Technology Changed the Face of the World – A Survey from Space (Macmillan 1983) / (Sidgwick & Jackson 1983)
- Space Careers (with Carol Rosin) (William Morrow Sep. 1984)
- Borderlands of Science: How to Think Like a Scientist and Write Science Fiction (Baen, Nov. 1999)
- Interstellar Travel and Multi-Generational Space Ships (with Yoji Kondo, Frederick Bruhweiler & John H. Moore) (Apogee Books, July 2003)

== See also ==
- List of people with brain tumors
