= The Billion Dollar Boy =

1997 science fiction novel

- First edition (publ. Tor Books); Cover art by Vincent Di Fate
- Author: Charles Sheffield
- Language: English
- Publisher: Tor Books
- Publication date: 1997
- ISBN: 0-312-86204-0 (first edition)
- Dewey Decimal: 813.54
- LC Class: PS3569.H39253 B55

The Billion Dollar Boy is a 1997 science fiction novel by Charles Sheffield.

== Plot ==
The story takes place centuries in the future where asteroid mining is a major industry. Earth's population is 14 billion, most of whom live in poverty. The protagonist is Shelby Cheever, a spoiled, exceedingly rich teenager, who lords his wealth over everyone around him, while taking pride in being completely unproductive. In a drunken vacation mishap, Shelby accidentally ends up in a remote mining colony with no easy return, due to entering a FTL translation node without setting the coordinates. There he is forced to work hard to survive, and interact with his new shipmates as equals. Through both routine labor, and many misadventures, Shelby endures much positive character building.

This book is a future retelling of Rudyard Kipling's 1897 novel Captains Courageous. Same plot: spoiled rich kid gets high [drunk] and falls off an ocean liner [spaceship] into the ocean [a wormhole node]. He is picked up by a fishing boat [space mining ship] and forced to work for/with them for several months until the hold is full. There is even the mysterious Pennsylvania Pratt [Scrimshander Limes] who has forgotten his identity after a personal tragedy and remembers it temporarily while saving shipwreck [sabotage] victims.

The book is a relatively light adventure tale, by Sheffield standards, and serves mainly as a platform for the author's views on child rearing, while giving some hard science fiction theories about far future technology and economics.
