= Divergence (novel) =

1991 novel by Charles Sheffield

- First edition cover Art by Bruce Jensen
- Author: Charles Sheffield
- Publisher: Del Rey Books
- Publication date: January 23, 1991
- ISBN: 978-0-345-36039-7
- Followed by: Transcendence (1992)

Divergence (1991) is a science fiction novel by American writer Charles Sheffield, part of his Heritage Universe series. The book, the sequel to Summertide, takes place millennia in the future when most of the Orion Arm of the galaxy has been colonized by humans and other races. Among the various star systems of this arm of the galaxy, a number of million-year-old artifacts have been discovered, remnants of a mysterious race called the Builders.

The characters in this book start just a few days after the previous book left off to go in search of a newly discovered artifact. This book introduces a few new characters that become important throughout the rest of the series. The characters work together to discover a new theory about the origins and current condition of the Builders. During this process, they discover that an old menace to the universe, thought to be extinct, has been unleashed upon the Orion Arm of the Milky Way once again.

The novel includes excerpts from the Lang Universal Artifact Catalog (Fourth Edition), and from the Universal Species Catalog (Subclass:Sapients).

The sequel to Divergence is Transcendence.
