= Gary Freeman (illustrator) =

American commercial artist

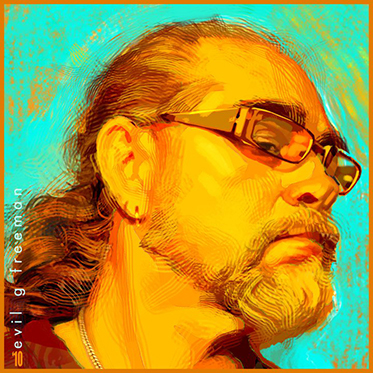
Self portrait of Gary Freeman.

Gary Freeman is an American commercial artist, who is involved in the publishing, advertising and video game industries. He has received multiple awards for his work in illustration and advertising. He has also been a lead concept designer for several notable video game franchises. Freeman currently lives with his wife in upstate New Hampshire.

== Illustration ==
Gary Freeman's illustrations are primarily influenced by science fiction and fantasy. Over 100 of his images have been published in notable science fiction magazines, including Amazing Stories, Analog, Fantastic Stories, Heavy Metal, and Isaac Asimov's Science Fiction Magazine. Of his published works, 36 have been used as magazine covers. Freeman's work has also been used as the covers for 21 science fiction novels published by Ace, Baen, and Roc. These include the 1991 collection of Asimov stories entitled Robots.

== Video games ==
Freeman was a concept designer for Westwood and Electronic Arts. He created concept and in-game art for the 1997 video game Blade Runner and worked on franchises such as Command & Conquer, Dune, Empire Earth, and Transformers.

== Awards ==
Freeman has received several awards for his work, including three ADDYs, a Bronze medal and a "Judge's Choice" award from the 2004 AIGA Awards, and three Readers' Choice Awards.

He has also received a total of 18 nominations from Isaac Asimov's Science Fiction Magazine for Best Cover Artist and Best Interior Artist. Freeman was nominated for the 1989 Chesley Award for Best Magazine Cover Illustration.

His illustrations were selected for inclusion in the 35th annual exhibit of the Society of Illustrators of Los Angeles, SPECTRUM 7, SPECTRUM 11, SPECTRUM 12, Expose 3, and Infected by Art Volumes 1-6, where he received the Silver award for Volume 1's Sci-Fi category.

== Artwork ==
Many of Freeman's artwork (displayed here) have been used as covers for science fiction novels and magazines.

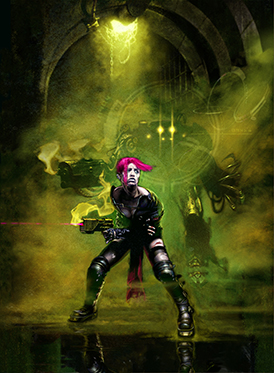
Illustration painted by Gary freeman for the cover of Heavy Metal Magazine, January 2005 issue. Versions appeared in Spectrum 12, Expose 3, and Infected by Art, Vol 1 where it received the Silver Award for Sci-Fi.

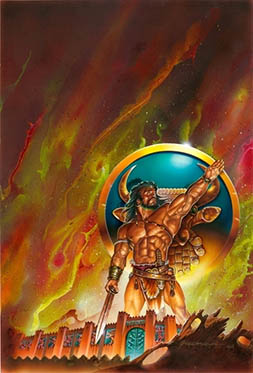
Illustration painted by Gary Freeman for the cover of Isaac Asimov’s Science Fiction Magazine, June 1988, illustrating Gilgamesh in Uruk by Robert Silverberg. This illustration was nominated for the Chesley Award for Best Magazine Cover Illustration in 1989.
