= Summertide =

1990 novel by Charles Sheffield

- First edition cover Cover art by Barclay Shaw
- Author: Charles Sheffield
- Series: Heritage Universe
- Genre: Science fiction
- Publisher: Gollancz Books
- Publication date: April 1990
- ISBN: 978-0-575-04761-7
- Followed by: Divergence (1990)

Summertide (1990) is a science fiction novel by American writer Charles Sheffield, the first of his series of Heritage Universe.

The story takes place millennia in the future, with humans having extensively colonized our spiral arm of the Milky Way and having encountered a number of intelligent alien races. Littered throughout the galaxy are hundreds of massive abandoned engineering projects built by a mysterious race, referred to as The Builders, extinct for three million years. An eclectic group of scientists and opportunists are descending upon one such artifact at a time when its surrounding environment is extremely dangerous to study an unusual phenomenon.

The novel includes excerpts from the Lang Universal Artifact Catalog (Fourth Edition), describing several Builder artifacts.

Divergence is the next book in the series.

== Reception ==
Kirkus Reviews calls it an "above-average space opera", while Publishers Weekly states that the "'series stands on its own, even though many threads are left dangling."
