= EarthSat =

American Aerospace company

Earth Satellite Corporation
- Trade name: EarthSat
- Founded: 1969; 57 years ago in Washington, D.C.,
- Defunct: 2017; 9 years ago
- Fate: Merged into Digital Globe to form Radiant Solutions
- Headquarters: Rockville, Maryland, United States
- Parent: MacDonald, Dettwiler and Associates Ltd. (2001-2017)

Earth Satellite Corporation (EarthSat), an American company, was a pioneer in the commercial use of Earth observation satellites. Founded in 1969, EarthSat was first headquartered in Washington, D.C., and later moved its offices to Bethesda, Maryland, and finally to Rockville, Maryland, in the late 1980s. In 2001, EarthSat was acquired by MacDonald, Dettwiler and Associates Ltd. (MDA) of Vancouver, British Columbia. In August 2005, EarthSat was incorporated as MDA Federal Inc., the U.S. operation of MDA Geospatial Services.

EarthSat pioneered the use of remote sensing for petroleum, mineral and groundwater exploration. It later expanded into satellite and aerial image processing, weather services and geographic information systems. EarthSat products were derived from NASA's Landsat program, Canada's RADARSAT-1 and an entire list of Earth observation satellites.

In August 1998, NASA contracted EarthSat to produce Landsat GeoCover - a positionally accurate orthorectified Landsat Thematic Mapper and Multispectral Scanner imagery covering the majority of the Earth's land mass. The contract was part of the NASA Scientific Data Purchase which was administrated through NASA's John C. Stennis Space Center. Geocover 2000 is one of the global satellite image products used in NASA World Wind.

GeoCover was later enhanced to EarthSat NaturalVue, a natural color Landsat 7 derived circa year 2000, orthorectified, mosaicked and color balanced digital image dataset covering the entire land area of the Earth except for the high latitude polar regions.

In 2017, MDA-US merged with Digital Globe to form Radiant Solutions which is a subsidiary of Maxar Technologies which was the former parent MDA company out of Canada.
